= List of military units of Estonia =

The List of military units of Estonia contains all military units to serve with the armed forces of Estonia from 1918 to the present day.

== 21st century Defence Forces ==
=== Defence Forces Headquarters ===
- General Department
- Strategic Communication Department
- Operations Division – J3
- Logistics Department – J4
- Analysis and Planning Department – J5
- Communications and Command Systems Department J6
- Training Department – J7
- Budget and Finance Department – J8
- Information Department
- Internal Audit Department
- Inspector General Service
- Department "Military Representation at SHAPE"
- Administration of the Commander of the Defence Forces
- Administration of the Chief of the General Staff
  - International Cooperation Division
  - Security Service Information Management Team

== Land Forces ==
=== Estonian Division ===
- Headquarters and Signal Battalion
  - Headquarters Company
  - Signal Company
- Logistics Battalion
  - Battalion Headquarters
  - 1st Logistics Company
  - 2nd Logistics Company
  - Maintenance Company
  - 1st Training Company
  - 2nd Training Company
- Artillery Regiment
  - Headquarters and Support Battery
  - 101st Self-Propelled Artillery Battalion (Serves 1IB)
  - 102nd Self-Propelled Artillery Battalion (Serves 2IB)
  - Maintenance Platoon
  - Unmanned Aerial Strike Battery
- Reconnaissance Battalion
  - Reconnaissance Company
  - Technical Intelligence Company
  - HUMINT Company

War-time units

- Short-Range Air Defence Battery
  - 1st Platoon
  - 2nd Platoon
  - 3rd Platoon
  - 4th Platoon

==== 1st Infantry Brigade ====
- Brigade Headquarters
- Scouts Battalion
  - Battalion Headquarters
  - Headquarters and Support Company
  - A - Armored Infantry Company
  - B - Armored Infantry Company
  - C - Armored Infantry Company
  - Combat Support Company
  - Self-Propelled Artillery Platoon
  - (Armor School)
- Kalev Infantry Battalion
  - Battalion Headquarters
  - Headquarters and Support Company
  - A - Infantry Company
  - B - Infantry Company
  - C - Infantry Company
  - D - infantry Company
  - Combat Support Company
- Viru Infantry Battalion
  - Battalion Headquarters
  - Support Center
  - A - Mechanized Infantry Company
  - B - Mechanized Infantry Company
  - C - Mechanized Infantry Company
  - D - Mechanized Infantry Company
  - G - Mechanized Infantry Company
  - Combat Support Company
  - (1103. Anti-Tank Company)
- Air Defence Battalion
  - Battalion Headquarters
  - Air Defence School
  - Anti-Aircraft Artillery Battery
  - Air Defence Missile Battery
  - Fire Control and Support Battery
- Engineer Battalion
  - Battalion Headquarters
  - Bridge Platoon
  - Support Platoon
  - Reconnaissance Platoon
  - Engineering School
  - Training Companies
  - Defence Forces Explosive Ordanance Disposal Center
- Combat Service Support Battalion
- Headquarters and Signal Company
  - Communications Platoon
  - Command and Support Platoon
  - Headquarters Defence Platoon
- 1103. Anti-Tank Company

==== 2nd Infantry Brigade ====
- Brigade Headquarters
- Kuperjanov Infantry Battalion
  - Battalion Headquarters
  - Headquarters and Support Company
  - A - Infantry Company
  - B - Infantry Company
  - C - Infantry Company
  - D - Infantry Company
  - Combat Support Company
  - Headquarters Defence Company
- Combat Services Support Battalion
  - Battalion Headquarters
  - Supply Platoon
  - Maintenance Platoon
  - Transport Platoon
  - Medical Center
- Headquarters and Signal Company
- Reconnaissance Company
- 26th Air Defence Battalion
- 27th Pioneer Battalion
- Unmanned Aerial Systems Company

===== War-time units =====
- (2nd Kuperjanov Infantry Battalion)
- (3rd Kuperjanov Infantry Battalion)
- (21st Infantry Battalion)
- (22nd Infantry Battalion)
- (23rd Infantry Battalion)
- (1203rd Anti-Tank Company)

== Air Force ==
=== Air Force Headquarters ===
- Personnel Department
- Intelligence Department
- Operations and Training Department
- Planning and Civil–Military Cooperation Department
- Logistics Department
- Communications and Command Systems Department
- Support Services Department

=== Ämari Air Base ===
- Headquarters
- Flightgroup
  - 1st Squadron
  - 2nd Squadron
- Airbase Operation Center
  - Communications and Radio Navigation Squadron
  - Air Force Support Squadron
- Airbase Defence Operations Center
- Airfield Operations Group
  - Airfield Maintenance Squadron
  - Aircraft Maintenance Squadron
  - Ground Handling Squadron
  - Communications and Radio Navigation Squadron
  - Air Traffic Control Service
  - Rescue and Firefighting Service
  - Fuel Service
  - Aviation Meteorology and Flight Safety Service
- Tactical Air Control Party Squadron (TACP)

=== Air Surveillance Wing ===
- Wing Headquarters
- Command and Reporting Centre (Ämari)
  - Air Operations Command Squadron
- Combined Command Reporting Centre (Karmelava)
- Engineering and Technical Group
  - Radar Maintenance Squadron
  - Radars Squadron
    - Viru Radar Site
    - Tõikamäe Radar Site
    - Kellavere Radar Site
    - Muhu Radar Site
    - Kõpu Radar Site
- Communications and IT Squadron
- Radar Defence Unit

=== Air Defence Wing ===
- Wing Headquarters
- 1st Missile Battery
- 2nd Missile Battery
- 3rd Missile Battery

=== Military Aviation Authority ===
- Headquarters
- Flight Operations Department
  - Aviation Operations Inspector
  - Aircraft Inspector
- Engineering Department
  - Infrastructure Inspector

== Navy ==
=== Mine Warfare Squadron ===
- EML Admiral Cowan
- EML Sakala
- EML Ugandi
- EML Wambola
- Clearance Diving Unit

=== Patrol Boat Squadron ===
- EML Kindral Kurvits
- EML Raju
- EML Valve

=== Combat Service Support Squadron ===
- Supply Section
- Maintenance Section
- Port Service
- Transport Section
- Medical Center

=== 81st Coastal Defense Squadron ===
- Squadron Headquarters
- Missile Battery
- Force Protection Company
- Combat Support Company
- Reconnaissance Teams

== Other Units ==
=== Estonian Special Operations Force ===
- Special Operations Task Group

=== Cyber Command ===
- Headquarters and Support Company
- Information and Communication Technology Centre
- Cyber and Information Operations Center
- Strategic Communications Center
- Signal School

=== Military Police ===
- Headquarters
- Guard Battalion
  - 1st Military Police Company
  - 2nd Military Police Company

=== Support Command ===
- Headquarters
- Logistics School
- Supply Battalion
- Movement and Transport Service
- Personnel Support Services Centre
- Medical Centre
- Medicine Battalion

== Ground Force ==
=== Divisions ===
Divisions in the Estonian Ground Forces existed till 1940.

- 1st Division
- 2nd Division
- 3rd Division
- 4th Division

- 20th Waffen-SS Grenadier Division

=== Regiments ===
In 1920

- 1st Infantry Regiment
- 2nd Infantry Regiment
- 3rd Infantry Regiment
- 4th Infantry Regiment
- 5th Infantry Regiment
- 6th Infantry Regiment
- 7th Infantry Regiment
- 8th Infantry Regiment
- 9th Infantry Regiment
- Kuperjanov Partisan Regiment
- Sakala Partisan Regiment
- Scouts Regiment
- Tallinn Reserve Regiment
- Baltic Regiment

=== Battalions ===
Infantry

- 2nd Single Infantry Battalion
- 3rd Single Infantry Battalion
- 4th Single Infantry Battalion
- 5th Single Infantry Battalion
- 6th Single Infantry Battalion
- 8th Single Infantry Battalion
- 9th Single Infantry Battalion
- 10th Single Infantry Battalion
- Baltic Battalion
- Sakala Partisan Battalion

Marine

- Marine Landing Battalion

== Unsorted ==
- Armored Train Regiment
- 1st Armored Train Regiment (:et)
- 1st Infantry Regiment (Estonia) (et: 1. Jalaväerügement)
- 5th Artillery Group (Estonia)
- 5th Infantry Regiment (Estonia)
- 6th Infantry Regiment (Estonia)
- Kalevlaste Maleva
- Läänemaa Vabatahtlik Jäägrikompanii
- Automobile-Tank Regiment (Estonia)
- Cavalry Regiment (Estonia)
