= Canon de 105 mle 1913 Schneider =

French artillery piece used in World War I and World War II

Canon de 105 M^{le} 1913
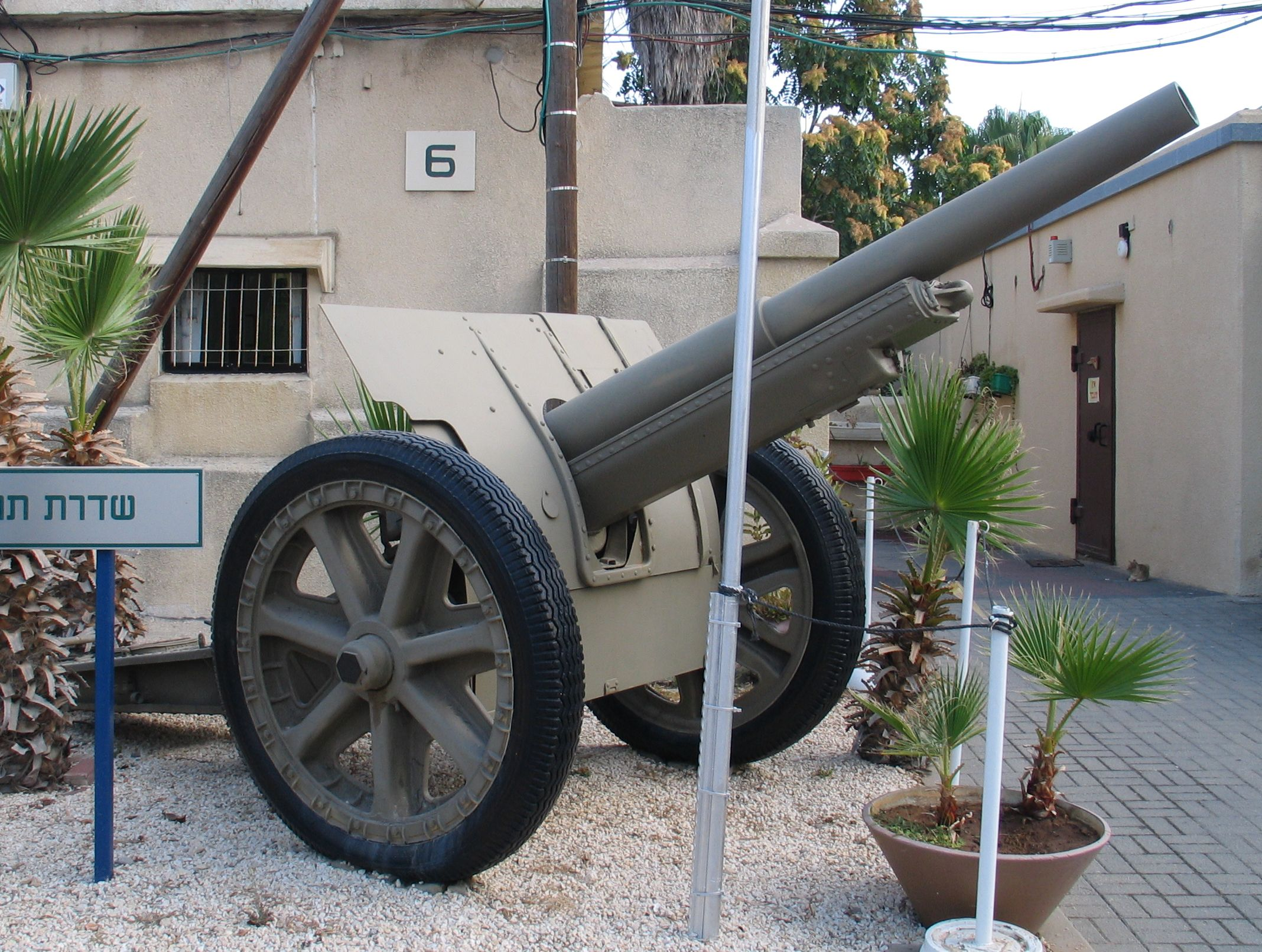
- Canon de 105 mle 1913 with rubber tires, in Batey ha-Osef Museum, Tel Aviv, Israel.
- Type: Field gun
- Place of origin: France

Service history
- In service: 1913–1948
- Wars: World War I World War II

Production history
- Designer: Schneider
- Manufacturer: Schneider
- No. built: France: ~1,600 carriages ~2,000 barrels; Italy: 956

Specifications
- Mass: Combat: 2,300 kg (5,100 lb); Travel: 2,650 kg (5,840 lb)
- Length: 6.3 m (20.67 ft)
- Barrel length: 2.987 m (9 ft 10 in) L/28.4
- Shell: 105×390mmR
- Shell weight: 15.7 kg (35 lb)
- Caliber: 105 mm (4.1 in)
- Breech: Interrupted screw
- Recoil: Hydropneumatic
- Carriage: Fixed trail
- Elevation: -5° / 37°
- Traverse: 6°
- Rate of fire: 6 rounds/min
- Muzzle velocity: 550 m/s (1,800 ft/s)
- Maximum firing range: 12 km (7.46 mi)

The Canon de 105 M^{le} 1913 Schneider was a French artillery piece used in World War I and World War II by many European countries.

== History ==
=== Development ===
In the early 1900s, the French company Schneider began a collaboration with the Russian company Putilov. For this collaboration, it had developed a gun using the Russian 107 mm round, which was ordered by the Russian Army to be produced in Russia (though the initial batch of guns was made in France). Schneider then decided to modify the design for the French 105 mm (4.134 inches) round and offer it to France as well. Initially, the French army was not interested in this weapon as they already had plenty of 75 mm field guns. However, in 1913, the French army purchased a small number under the designation Canon de 105 mle 1913 Schneider; it was also known by the service designation L 13 S.

The lighter 75 mm guns were of limited use against trenches; so, once the western front in World War I had settled down to trench warfare, the French army ordered large numbers of the L 13 S, which, with its larger 15.74 kg (34.7 lb) shell, was more effective against fortified positions and had a range of 12,000 metres (7.5 mi).

=== Other users ===
After the end of World War I, France sold or gave many Schneider 105 mm guns to various other countries, including Belgium, Italy, Poland, and Yugoslavia. In Italy, the 105 mm was re-designated the Cannone da 105/28 mod. 13 and saw service until 1943. Guns were also produced under license in Italy, starting from September 1914, by Ansaldo. Poland also used new model of Schneider's gun with a longer barrel and split trail, called the wz. 29, which was in fact a completely different weapon; both were in service at the beginning of WW II in 1939. In 1939 Poland had 118 of wz. 13 guns and 124 of wz. 29 guns, used in Heavy Artillery Detachments.

Estonia used three 1913 Schneiders on three railway artillery platforms in the Estonian Armored Train Regiment from 1934-1941. The Estonian artillery pieces would later be captured and used by the USSR in the Second World War after the USSR invaded and occupied the Baltic States in 1940.

The German conquests of Poland, Belgium, France, and Yugoslavia during World War II gave them large numbers of captured 105 mm Schneider guns. 854 L 13 S's were in service in France and a large number were captured. Many of these were installed in the Atlantic Wall system of coastal defenses.

Finland was able to buy 12 of these guns from France during the Winter War; they also rebarreled six captured Russian 107mm Schneider guns (four 1910 and two 1913 models) to 105mm. In addition, they were able to purchase 54 ex-Polish Armata 105 mm wz. 29 Schneider guns from Germany.

In 1940, French supplied Turkey with Mle 1913 Schneider guns originally intended for Poland, in sufficient numbers to equip three artillery battalions.

== Designations ==
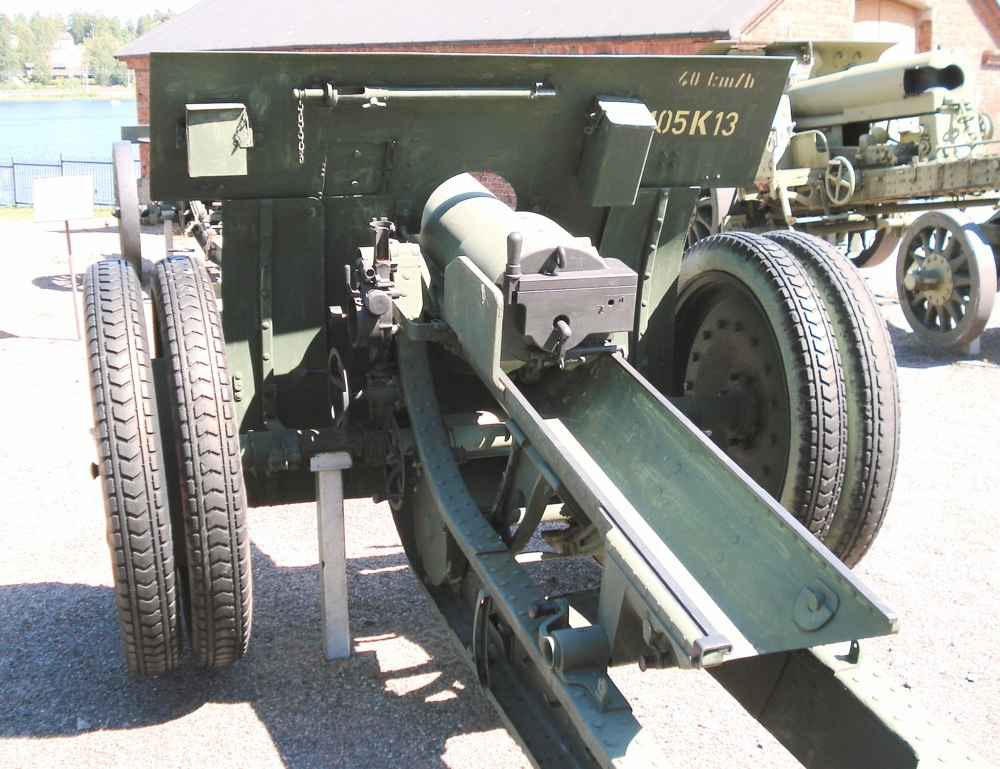
Finnish 105 K/13, with rubber tires, in Hämeenlinna Artillery Museum, Finland.

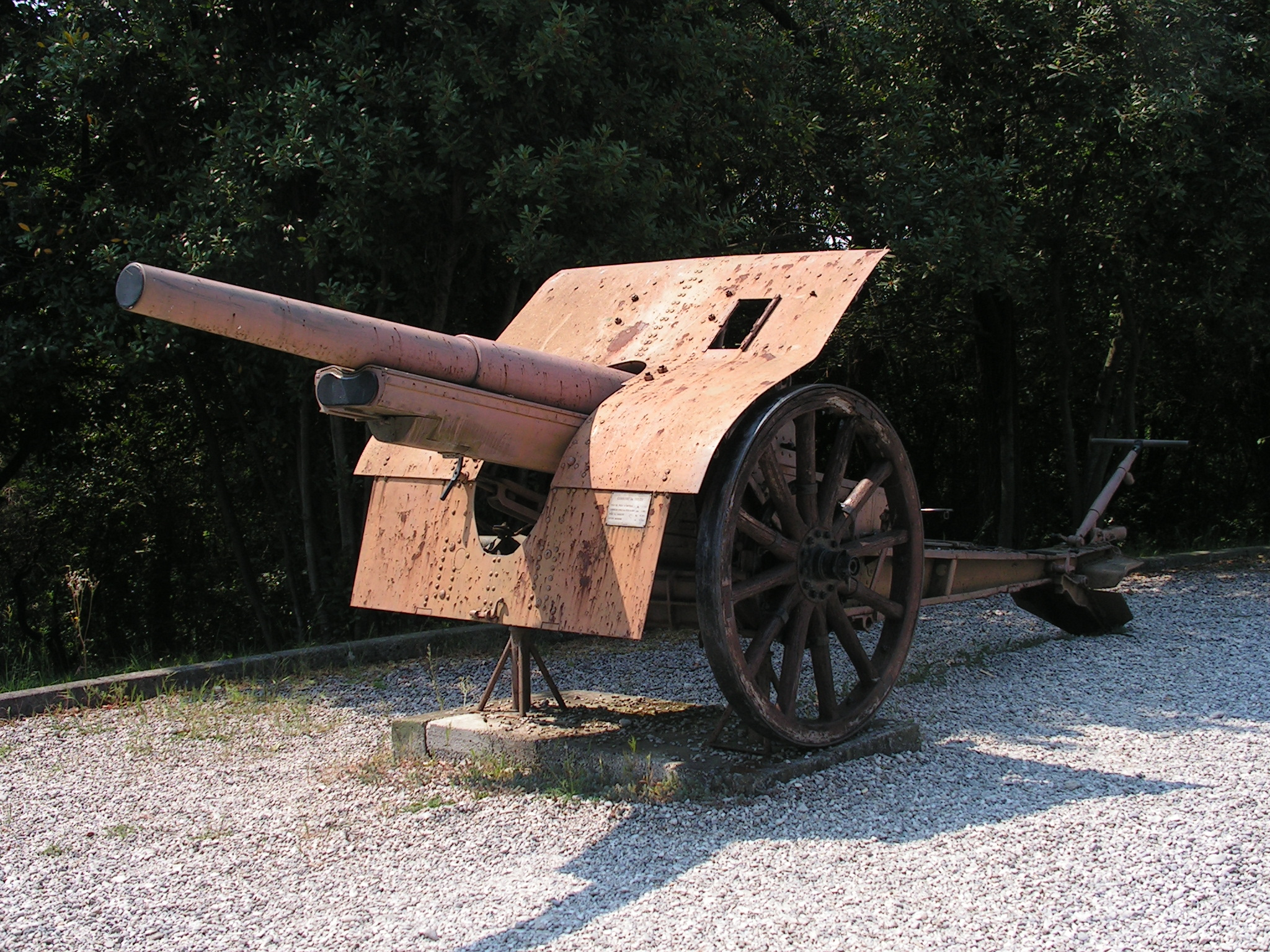
Cannone da 105/28 mod. 13

Because the gun was used by many countries, it had many official designations.

- Canon de 105 mle 1913 Schneider — French designation
- 105 L 13 S — French army's designation during World War I
- 105mm L. francouzský hrubý kanon vz. 1913 „Schneider“ — Czechoslovak designation
- Cannone da 105/28 modello 1913 (often shortened to Cannone da 105/28) — Italian designation
- 105 mm armata wz. 13 and 105 mm armata dalekonośna wz. 29 — Polish designations for the original gun and a modernised version respectively
- German designations include:
  - 10.5 cm K 331(f) — For guns captured from France
  - 10.5 cm K 333(b) — For guns captured from Belgium
  - 10.5 cm K 338(i) — For guns captured from Italy
  - 10.5 cm K 338(j) — For guns captured from Yugoslavia
  - 10.5 cm K 13(p) and 10.5 cm K 29(p) — For guns captured from Poland
- Finnish designations include:
  - 105 K/13 — Original French gun.
  - 105 K/10 — 107mm Russian Gun rebarrelled to 105mm
  - 105 K/29 — Polish 105 mm wz. 29 Schneider guns (These were captured guns which had been sold to Finland by Germany).

== Users ==
- Belgium
- Czechoslovakia
- Estonia
- Finland
- France
- Nazi Germany
- Italy
- Israel
- Poland
- Soviet Union
- Turkey
- Yugoslavia
