= Voldemar Karl Koht =

Estonian military personnel (1893–1942)

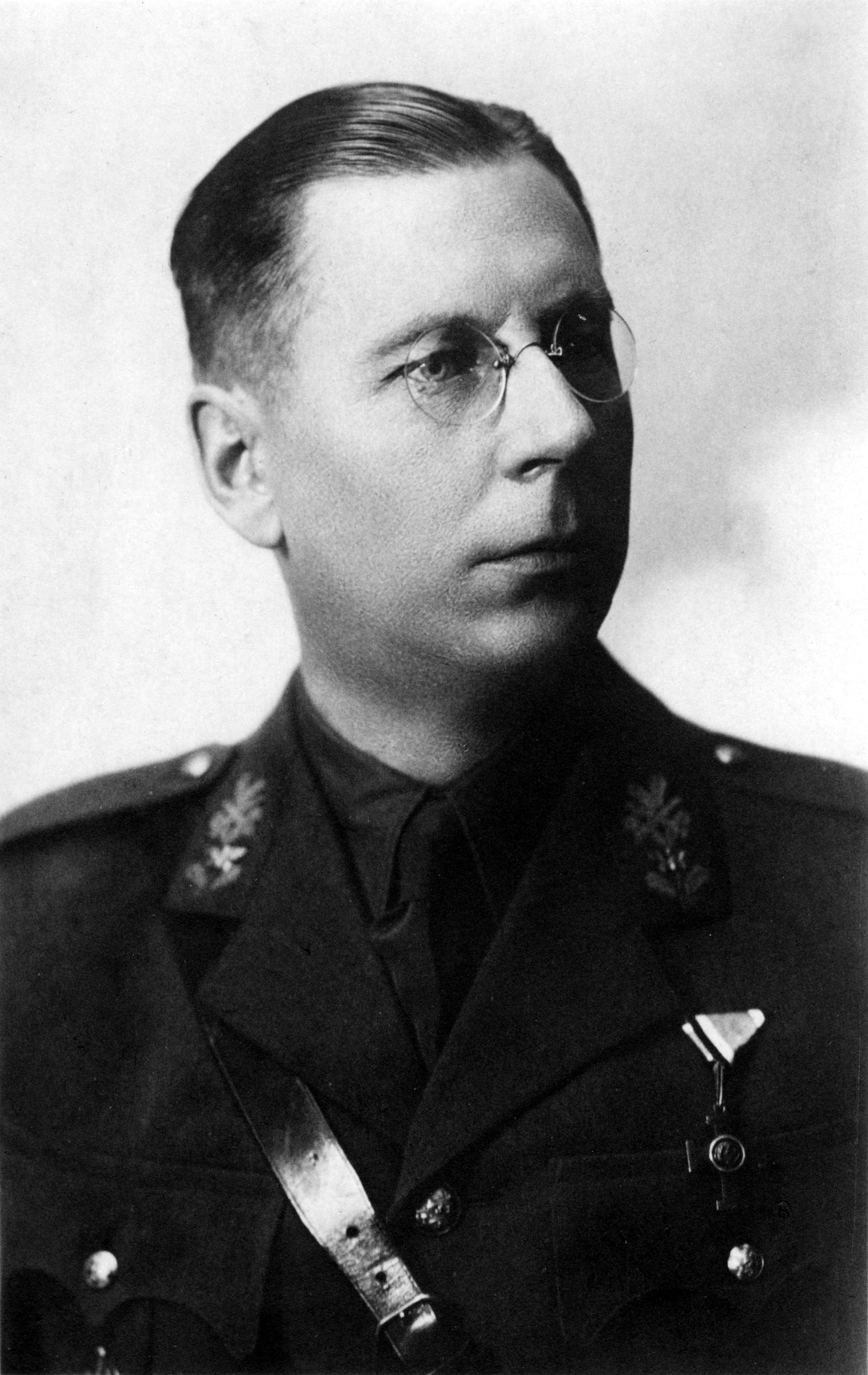
- Voldemar Karl Koht sometime between 1920 and 1938
- Born: Voldemar Karl Koch; 21 February 1893; Vao Municipality (now Väike-Maarja Parish), Estonia
- Died: 2 September 1942 (aged 49); Norillag Prison, Norilsk, Russia
- Military career
- Allegiance: Russian Empire; Estonia
- Branch: Russian Imperial Army; Estonian Army
- Service years: 1914–1941
- Rank: Colonel
- Unit: Armored Train Regiment
- Conflicts: World War I Estonian Independence War; World War II
- Awards: Cross of Liberty II/3; Order of the Cross of the Eagle III; Order of Saint Anna II, III and IV; Order of Saint Stanislav II and III

Voldemar Karl Koht VR II/3 (until 1940 Voldemar Karl Koch; 21 February 1893 – 2 September 1942) was an Estonian soldier and commander of the Estonian Armored Train Regiment.

== Early life ==
Voldemar Karl Koht was born on 21 February 1893 in Vao Municipality (Now Väike-Maarja Parish) in Lääne-Viru County as Voldemar Karl Koch to Karl and Ida Margaretha Koch. Koch attended Tartu Aleksandri Gymnasium and graduated with a C-grade. From 1913-1914, Koch studied at an officer school in Pskov.

== Military career ==
=== First World War ===
Koch was promoted to the rank of Ensign in June 1914. He fought in the First World War under the 95th Krasnoyarsk Infantry Regiment against the Germans, where he was wounded and concussed.

=== Estonian Independence War ===
In 1918, Koch served as a junior officer in the 5th Infantry Regiment of the Estonian army during the Estonian Independence war, but was demoted to private during a retreat in December 1918. On 1 January 1919, Koch was recommissioned into the 2nd Infantry Regiment, where he was promoted to Captain for exemplary service on 25 September 1919. Koch served as battalion commander of the 4th Infantry Regiment.

Koch took part in battles near Pada Manor, Paju, Kriuši, Narva, Luga River, and Krasnaya Gorka. At the end of the war, Koch was awarded with the Cross of Liberty, Second Class, Third Rank on 17 August 1920.

=== Interwar ===
After the Estonian Independence War, he continued to serve in the Estonian National Army's infantry, where he was the commander of multiple battalions, and from 1923-1924, he was the acting commander of the 1st Infantry Regiment. Koch was promoted to Lieutenant Colonel on 30 January 1924, and he was appointed commander of the 1st Battalion of the 1st Infantry Regiment in March 1924. Koch was later transferred to the 5th Infantry Regiment as commander of the 5th Battalion in October 1925. On 1 October to 28 October 1928, Koch was appointed commander of the 4th Infantry Regiment in Jõhvi.

=== Armored Train Regiment ===
In April 1934, Koch was appointed commander of the 2nd Armored Train Regiment. Later that year, Koch attended a higher military school (Kõrgem Sõjakool) (Later Estonian Military Academy). Upon graduating, Koch became commander of the Armored Train Regiment in 1936. On 24 February 1936, Koch was promoted to Colonel.

In February 1940, Koch was appointed commander of the 2nd Division of the Armored Train Regiment. The same year, he Estonianized his surname to Koht.

=== Second World War ===
After the Soviet Union invaded and occupied the Baltic States in June 1940, the Estonian army was formed into the 22nd Red Rifle Corps of the Red Army. Koht served as commander of the 140th Rifle Regiment of the 182nd Red Rifle Division in the 22nd Red Rifle Corps.

== Imprisonment and death ==
On 14 June 1941, Koht was arrested at the Värska training camp, where he was transported to Gulag labor camp Norillag in Norilsk. Koht was executed by gunfire on 2 September 1942 at Norillag.
