= Canon de 75 modèle 1914 Schneider =

Canon de 75mm Modele 1914
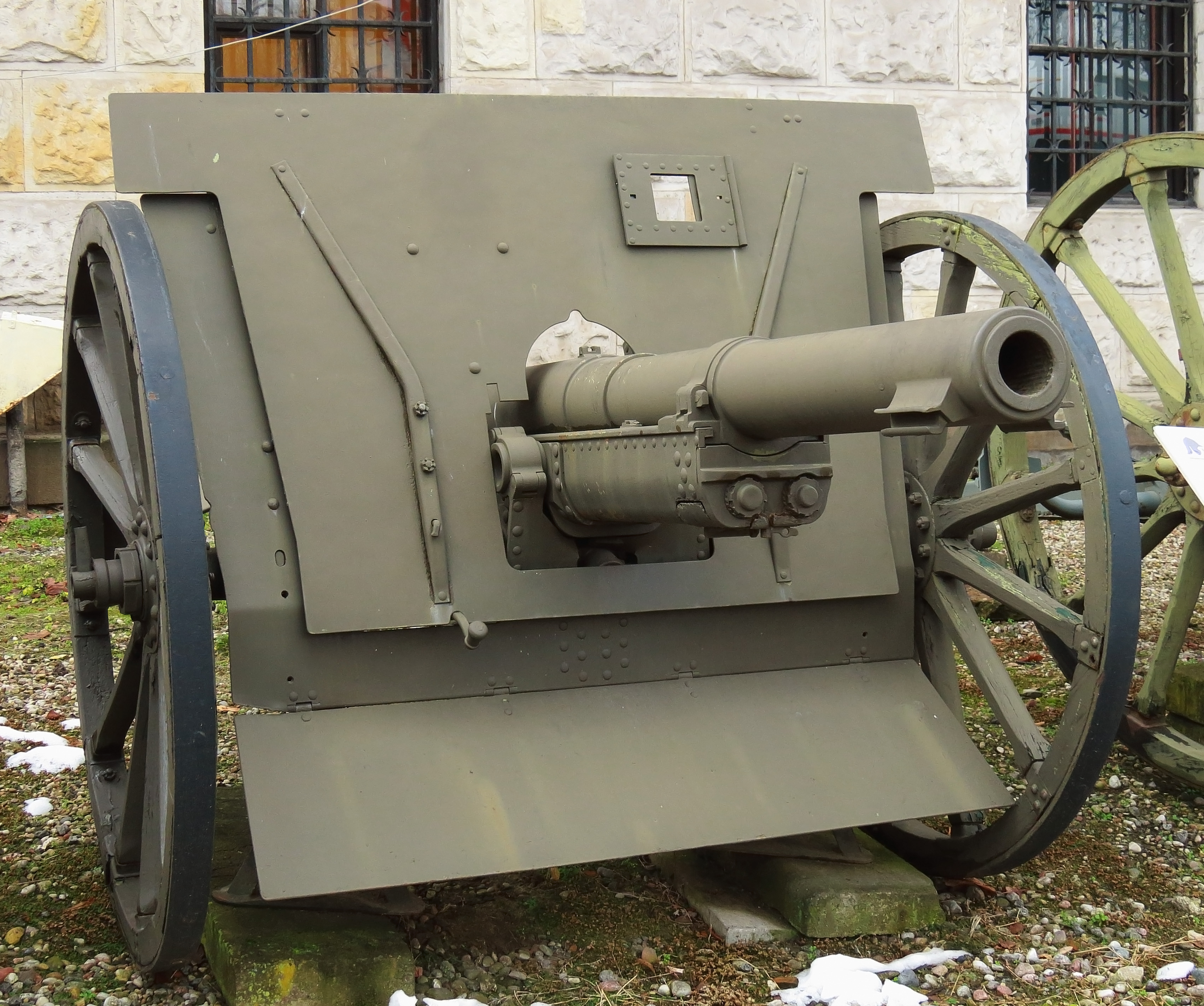
- Canon de 75 modèle 1914 Schneider Polish Army Museum in Warsaw.
- Type: light field gun
- Place of origin: France

Service history
- In service: 1914–1930s
- Used by: France, Poland
- Wars: World War I, Polish-Soviet War

Production history
- Produced: 1914–?

Specifications
- Mass: 1108 kg (2,700 lbs) in battery
- Crew: 6
- Shell: high-explosive, shrapnel
- Shell weight: 5.50-7.20 kg (12.12-16 lbs)
- Caliber: 75 mm (2.95 in)
- Carriage: horse-drawn
- Rate of fire: 12-15/min

The Canon de 75 modèle 1914 Schneider was a light field gun used by the French Army of World War I. It was created by modifying an export-model field gun built by Schneider et Cie at Le Creusot to fire shells from the family of 75mm artillery ammunition used by the Canon de 75 modèle 1897 and the Canon de 75 modèle 1912 Schneider.

The Canon de 75 modèle 1914 Schneider bore a close resemblance to Canon de 75mm modèle 1912 Schneider. Thanks, however, to a somewhat longer barrel, the Model 1914 field gun weighed more than the Model 1912 field gun and could fire its shells out to greater distances. As French artillery authorities viewed the Model 1914 field gun as both less robust and less capable than the famous Model 1897 field gun, they replaced the former with the latter as soon as sufficient numbers of the latter became available. The Model 1914 field guns withdrawn from French batteries were, for the most part, made available to countries allied with France.
