= Ferré-class submarine =

Peruvian class of submarines

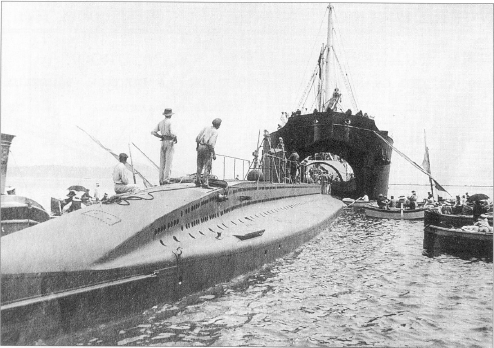
- Teniente Ferré being loaded aboard Kanguroo, a French ship built to transport submarines.

Class overview
- Name: Ferré class
- Builders: Schneider-Creusot
- Operators: Peruvian Navy
- In commission: 1912–1919
- Completed: 2
- Scrapped: 2

General characteristics
- Type: Submarine
- Displacement: 300 tons (surfaced); 400 tons (submerged)
- Length: 52.1 m (170 ft 11 in)
- Beam: 5.1 m (16 ft 9 in)
- Draught: 3.1 m (10 ft 2 in)
- Propulsion: 2 × Schneider-Carels 6-cylinder diesel engines, 2 × electric motors, 2 shafts
- Speed: 13 knots (24 km/h; 15 mph) (surfaced); 8 knots (15 km/h; 9.2 mph) (submerged)
- Range: 2,000 nmi (3,700 km; 2,300 mi) at 10 knots (19 km/h; 12 mph) (surfaced); 80 nmi (150 km; 92 mi) at 4 knots (7.4 km/h; 4.6 mph) (submerged)
- Test depth: 30 m (98 ft)
- Complement: 21
- Armament: 4 × 450 mm torpedo tubes; 8 torpedoes total

The Ferré class was a pair of submarines in service with the Peruvian Navy (MGP) during the period around and during World War I. The first, BAP Teniente Ferré, was in service from 1912 to 1919. The second, BAP Teniente Palacios, was in service from 1913 to 1919. Both were constructed by the French steel company Schneider-Creusot by the order of the MGP.

== Background ==
=== Naval arms race ===
After the decolonization of South America from colonial powers such as the Portuguese Empire and the Spanish Empire, many of the newly-independent nations sought to gain power over one another economically and militarily. Throughout the 19th and 20th centuries, it became increasingly clear to many regional powers that a well-developed navy would be crucial to asserting their dominance on the global stage. A strong navy could allow nations to increase their international market and influence through maritime trade and coastal dominance over their neighbors. This led to multiple naval arms races throughout the two centuries, including the notorious South American dreadnought race that saw South American naval powers such as Chile, Brazil, and Argentina purchasing or constructing some of the largest and most heavily armed warships at the time.

=== Ecuadorian–Peruvian rivalry ===
Of the nations that participated in such arms races, Peru and Ecuador had a long-standing rivalry that influenced how they competed. Their political tension began with a long-lasting territorial dispute stemming from the way the Spanish Empire defined its colonies' borders. This dispute lasted from 1821 to 1998 (making it one of the longest-lasting territorial disputes in history) and caused a number of conflicts between the two nations, chiefly the Ecuadorian–Peruvian War from 1857 to 1860. This border dispute, along with many other diplomatic disputes, caused longstanding friction that spurred an economic and military arms race between them as a sub-set of the overall race occurring in South America at the time.

=== War of the Pacific ===
In 1884, Peru was defeated by Chile in the War of the Pacific. At the Battle of Angamos, the culmination of the naval encounters throughout the war, Peru lost the bulk of its naval fighting force and could no longer challenge Chile's superior navy. After the war ended, Peru had to rebuild much of its economy that was damaged by the fighting. However, after a period of extensive economic recovery, Peru would begin building up its navy once again in the first few years of the 20th century.

During the War of the Pacific, Peru had its first experience with submarines when Peruvian engineer Federico Blume Othon constructed Toro Submarino, a small torpedo submarine. Toro Submarino entered duty but never saw combat before being scuttled in January 1881, following defeat at the Battle of San Juan and Chorrillos, to prevent its capture by Chilean forces.

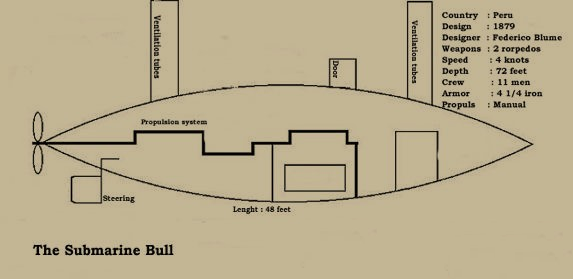
A diagram of the 48 ft Submarino Toro, Peru's first operational submarine.

== Service entry ==
After hearing rumors of Ecuador potentially purchasing the small Italian cruiser Umbria, Peru sought a deal to purchase a ship that would balance their two navies. Since 1896, a French naval mission had operated in Peru and assisted with the training, acquisition, and modernization of the Peruvian fleet. Because of this, in 1908 Peru engaged in negotiations with France to purchase the cruiser Dupuy de Lôme. However, they would later find out the Umbria would be sold to Haiti instead. Additionally, upon reviewing the Dupuy de Lôme, Peru found it to be in a very poor condition and unsuitable for their purposes. They lost interest in the deal, but they continued exploring options of purchasing or ordering ships from the French. Since the rivaling Chile had a vastly superior navy and given Peru's limited resources, a Lieutenant Guette of the French Navy (then the director of the Peruvian Naval Academy) believed submarines were the only possible short-term defense improvement available to them.

In 1910, the Peruvian Navy ordered two Laubeuf-style submarines from the Schneider-Creusot steel company. The first, BAP Teniente Ferré, was delivered in October 1912. The second, BAP Teniente Palacios, was delivered in October the following year. The ships were named after two lieutenants (Diego Ferré Sosa and Enrique Palacios Mendiburu) that served on the Peruvian ironclad Huáscar and died during the Battle of Angamos. The crews were trained in France.

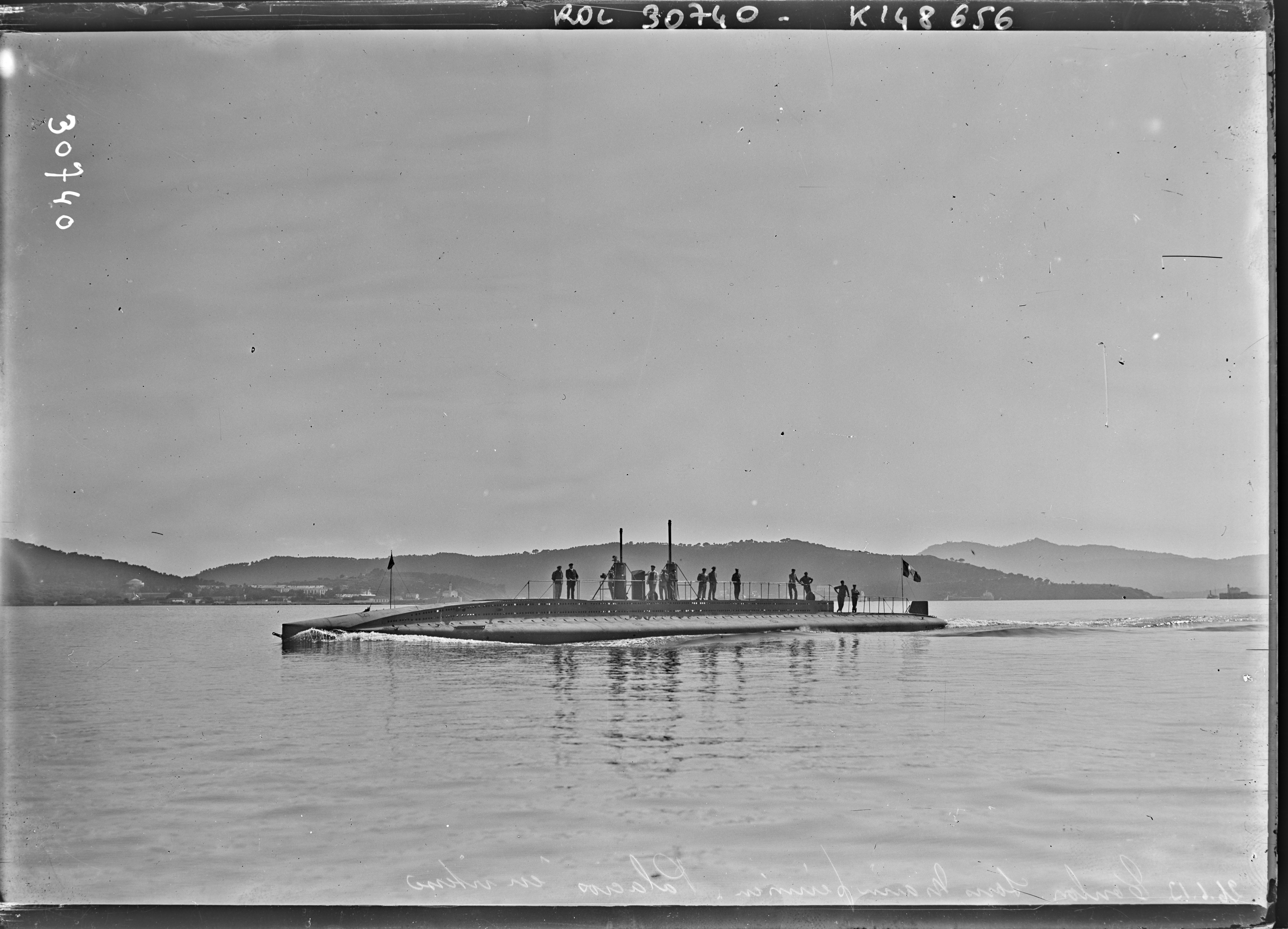
The Palacios off the coast of Toulon, France.

== Operational history ==
While Teniente Ferré and Teniente Palacios never saw combat, as Peru was neutral during the First World War, they did serve as training vessels and performed patrols in the Pacific Ocean. Due to the briefness of the Toro Submarino's service during the War of the Pacific, this was the Peruvian Navy's first opportunity to thoroughly train with submarines. During their early years in service, they were so active in training that the loss of torpedoes during practice became a significant expense for the Navy.

Both were removed from the Peruvian naval record in 1919 and were scrapped in 1921 due to a lack of spare parts and batteries.

== Specifications ==
Specifications from The Illustrated Directory of Submarines of the World (2002)

Length: 52.1 m (170 ft 11 in)

Beam: 5.1 m (16 ft 9 in)

Draft: 3.1 m (10 ft 2 in)

Displacement: 300 tons (surfaced), 400 tons (submerged)

Complement: 21

Range: 2000 nmi at 10 kt (surfaced), 80 nmi at 4 kt (submerged)

Max speed: 13 kt (surfaced), 8 kt (submerged)

Diving depth: 30 metres (98 ft)

Armament: 4 x 450mm torpedo tubes, 8 Smulders torpedoes

Propulsion: 2 x Schneider-Carels 6-cylinder diesel engines, 2 x electric motors, 2 shafts

== Bibliography ==
- Avendaño, Daniel (2016). El secreto del submarino : la historia mejor guardada de la Armada de Chile [The secret of the submarine : the Chilean Navy's best kept story] (in Spanish). Chile: Santiago de Chile : Ediciones B, Grupo Zeta. ISBN 978-956-304-226-9. Archived from the original on 2025-04-24.
- Erhart, Edward Samuel (December 2019). The 'Loose Dreadnoughts:' South America's Struggle for Naval Preeminence (Thesis). East Carolina University.
- Gardiner, Robert (1985). Conway's All the world's fighting ships, 1906–1921. Annapolis, Maryland: Naval Institute Press. p. 210. ISBN 0-87021-907-3. Archived from the original on 2020-01-15.
- Miller, David (2002). The Illustrated Directory of Submarines of the World. London: Salamander Books Ltd. p. 86. ISBN 1-84065-375-2.
- Scheina, Robert L. (1987). Latin America: A Naval History 1810–1987. Annapolis, Maryland: Naval Institute Press. ISBN 0-87021-295-8. Archived from the original on 2023-03-23.
- Scheina, Robert L. (1978). "The New Peruvian Navy 1885–1976". Warship International. 15 (3): 204–211. ISSN 0043-0374. JSTOR 44895380.
