= Indrek Sirel =

Estonian military officer

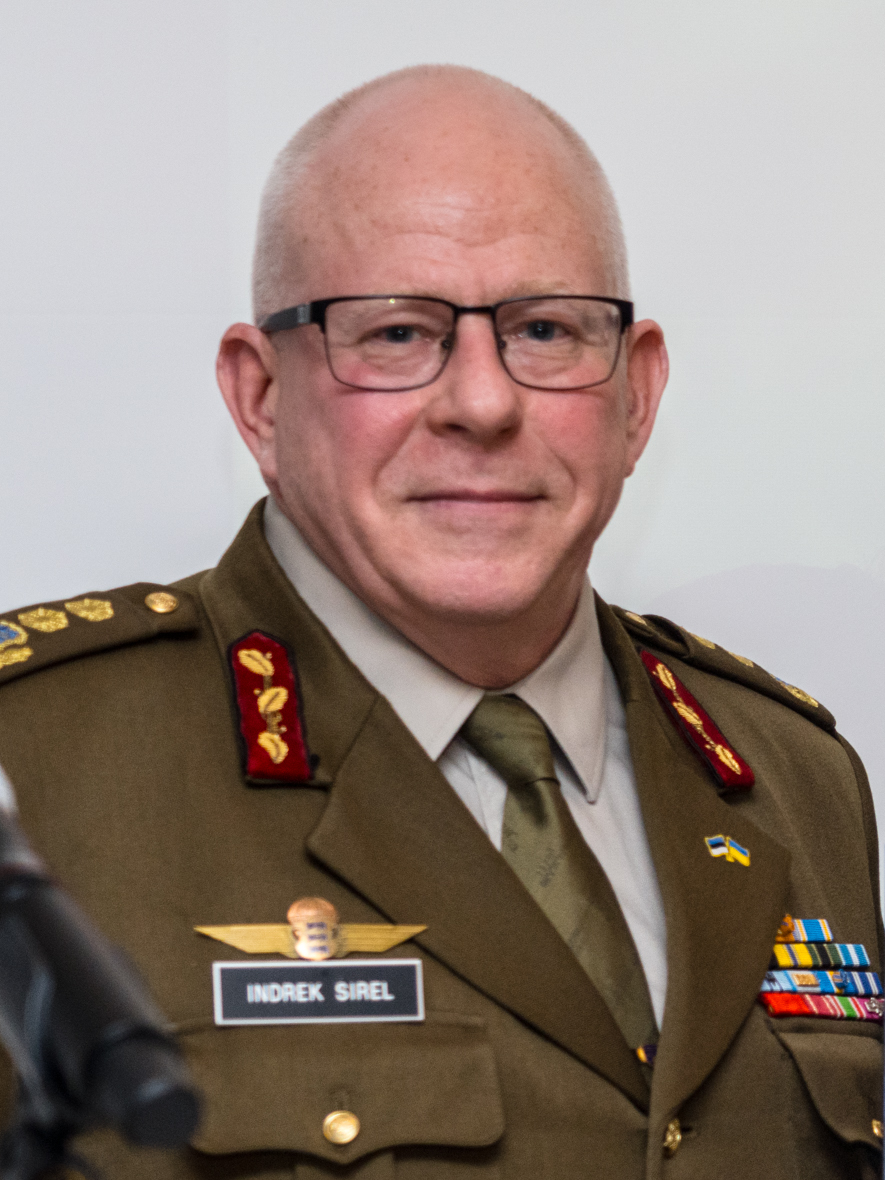
- Indrek Sirel in 2024
- Born: 16 January 1970 (age 56); Tallinn, then part of Estonian SSR, Soviet Union
- Military career
- Allegiance: Soviet Union; Estonia
- Branch: Soviet Army; Estonian Land Forces
- Service years: 1991; 1993–present
- Rank: Major General
- Commands: Estonian Division; Estonian Land Forces; Scouts Battalion; Viru Infantry Battalion
- Conflicts: War in Afghanistan

Indrek Sirel (born 16 January 1970) is a Major General of the Estonian Defence Forces and current commander of the Estonian Division.

== Early life and career ==
Sirel was born in Tallinn. Sirel graduated from the Moscow Higher Combined Arms Command School in June 1991 and joined the Soviet Army. One of his early assignments included being a Platoon Leader in the Baical Military District. He joined the Estonian Defence Forces in June 1993 and has gone through several different courses both in Estonia and in the United States before his post as head of the Estonian Army.

== Effective dates of promotion ==
=== Soviet Army ===
Promotions
Insignia	Rank	Date
	Lieutenant	1991

=== Estonian Defence Forces ===
Promotions
Insignia	Rank	Date
	Lieutenant	1993
	Captain	1993
	Major	17 February 1998
	Lieutenant colonel	19 June 2002
	Colonel	18 February 2008
	Brigadier General	20 June 2012
	Major General	14 February 2018

== Awards ==
- 4th class Order of the Cross of the Eagle
- Defence Forces Service Medal
- Special Cross Of The Defence Force
- The Golden Cross Of The Army Officer
- The Golden Cross Of The Defence Forces

Military offices
Preceded by Johannes Kert	Commander of the Estonian Land Forces; 2008–2012	Succeeded by Artur Tiganik
Preceded by Artur Tiganik	Deputy Commander of the Estonian Defence Forces; 2016–2021	Succeeded by
