= 152 mm howitzer M1909/30 =

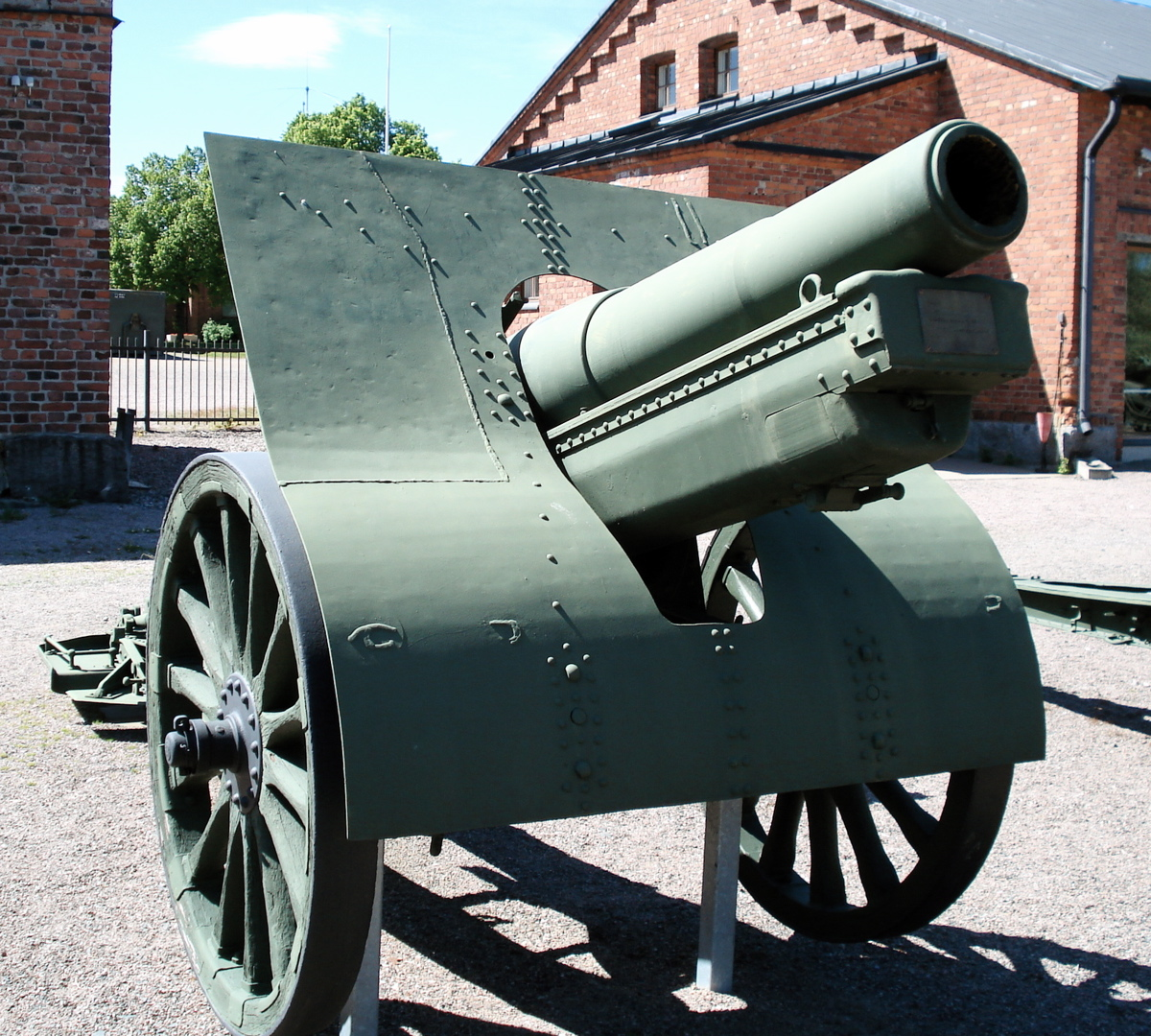
- M1909/30 in Hämeenlinna Artillery Museum, Finland
- Type: field howitzer
- Place of origin: USSR

Production history
- Manufacturer: Perm plant
- Produced: 1931–1941
- No. built: 2,550–2,611

Specifications
- Mass: combat: 2,810 kg (6,195 lbs) travel: 3,270 kg (7,209 lbs)
- Length: 5.84 m (19 ft 2 in)
- Barrel length: overall: 2.16 m (7 ft 1 in) L/14 bore: 1.9 m (6 ft 3 in) L/13.1
- Width: 1.89 m (6 ft 2 in)
- Height: 1.92 m (6 ft 4 in)
- Crew: 8
- Shell: 152 x 239mm R
- Caliber: 152.4 mm (6 in)
- Breech: interrupted screw
- Recoil: Hydro-pneumatic
- Carriage: Box trail
- Elevation: 0° to 41°
- Traverse: 2°50’
- Rate of fire: 5-6 rounds per minute
- Muzzle velocity: 344 m/s (1,129 ft/s)
- Maximum firing range: 8,850 m (9,678 yds)

152 mm howitzer M1909/30 (Russian: 152-мм гаубица обр. 1909/30 гг.) was a Soviet 152.4 mm (6 inch) howitzer, a modernization of the 152 mm howitzer M1909, initially designed by Schneider. It was the most numerous 152 mm howitzer employed by Red Army in World War II.

== Development and production history ==
From the late 1920s, the RKKA sought to upgrade its World War I-era artillery pieces. One of the modernized weapons was the 152 mm howitzer M1909, initially designed by the French arms manufacturer Schneider. After several experiments it was determined that the muzzle velocity of the piece could be increased to about 395 m/s (further increase could result in damage to the carriage). In 1930 at the Bolshevik Plant, the gun was experimentally fitted with a muzzle brake.

In 1930–1931, the Perm plant developed a modernization project. Initially, the only element of the project was lengthening the chamber to 340 mm (upgraded barrels received a mark "lengthened chamber"). In late production pieces minor changes in breechblock, cradle and elevation mechanism were introduced. Some pieces also had their wooden wheels replaced by steel ones with rubber tires. The modernized weapon was officially adopted as 152-mm howitzer model 1909/30.

The M1909/30 was a typical short-barrel howitzer, intended mostly for shooting with elevations from +20° to +41°, using separately loaded ammunition. The gun had interrupted screw breechblock; hydraulic recoil buffer and hydro-pneumatic recuperator were both mounted under the barrel. The carriage was of single trail type with limited traverse and, typically, unsprung wooden wheels (some pieces produced from 1937 had metal wheels with solid rubber tires). With the gun was issued limber, which had either wooden or metal wheels.

From 1931 to 1941 the Perm plant delivered 2,188 pieces.

Production of M1909/30, pcs.
Year	1931	1932	1933	1934	1935	1936	1937	1938	1939	1940	1941	Total
Produced, pcs.	158	210	260	54	2	0	99	480	620	295	10	2,188

== Organization and employment ==
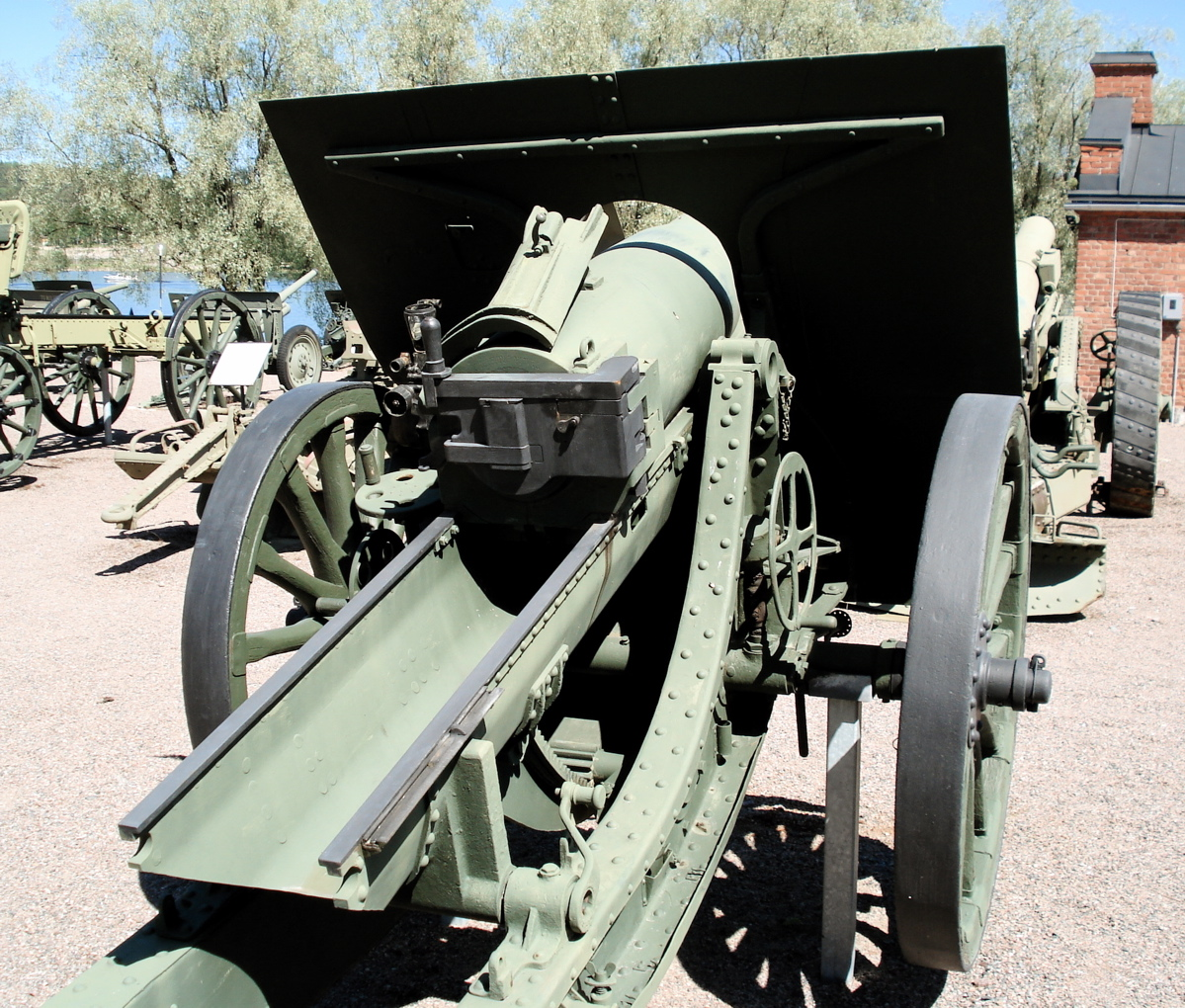
M1909/30, rear view.

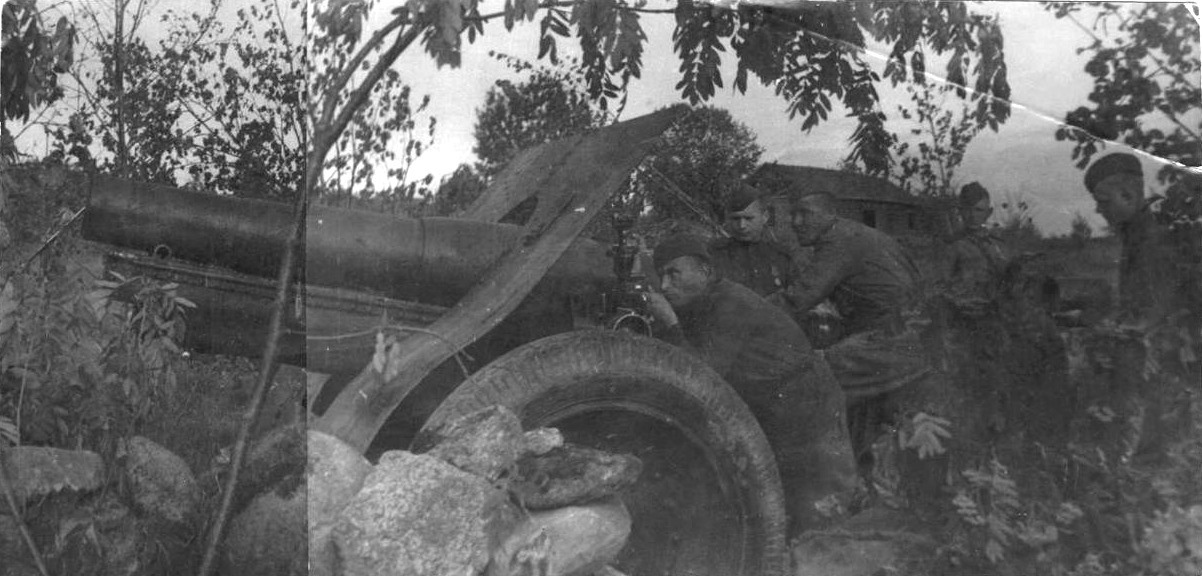
An M1909/30 of the 23rd Breakthrough Artillery Division during the Vyborg–Petrozavodsk offensive, 14 June 1944

Under the organization of 1939, each rifle division had a howitzer regiment with a 152-mm howitzers battalion (12 pieces). In July 1941 these regiment were cancelled. Same fate befell 152-mm howitzers battalions of motorized and armored divisions.

Estonia used 4 M1909s on 2 railway artillery platforms in the Estonian Armored Train Regiment from 1934 to 1941. The Estonian artillery pieces would later be captured and used by the USSR in the Second World War after the USSR invaded and occupied the Baltic States.

Corps artillery units didn't employ 152-mm howitzers early in the war (they did use howitzer-guns ML-20); but from late 1943 the recreated corps artillery included a regiment consisted of five batteries (totaling 20 pieces), equipped, along with other types, with 152-mm howitzers. By 1 June 1944, there were 192 such pieces in corps artillery.

Reserve of the Main Command included howitzer regiments (48 pieces) and heavy howitzer brigades (32 pieces), sometimes organized into artillery divisions.

The howitzer was used by the RKKA in the Battle of Khalkhin Gol and in the Winter War. At the outbreak of the German-Soviet War the M1909/30 was still the most numerous 152-mm howitzer in Soviet service. On 1 June 1941, the RKKA possessed about 2,500 pieces, about twice as much as the newer M-10s, which were soon removed from production. Although from 1943 the M1909/30 was again being gradually replaced, this time by D-1, it was still in service by the end of the war.

A number of guns of this type fell into the hands of Wehrmacht in 1941–42; these were adopted as 15,2 cm sFH 445(r). Germans also produced ammunition for these guns. Most of the pieces were assigned to coastal artillery.

Finnish Army captured 14 pieces during the Winter War, and 85 more early in the Continuation War. The guns were actively used in combat. As a training weapon, the M1909/30 remained in Finnish service until the 1980s.

== Summary ==
1 - HE/Frag shell OF-530, 2 - fragmentation shell O-530, 3 - HEAC (anti-concrete) shell G-530.

The M1909/30 was a relatively minor upgrade of a World War I-era howitzer, which did not address the main flaws of the latter, namely:

- Limited towing speed due to unsprung wheels
- Limited elevation and very small traverse

A short barrel meant short range, less than that of its main adversaries, such as the German 15 cm sFH 18 (8.8 km vs 13.3 km). Low muzzle velocity and small traverse also made the gun helpless against enemy armor.

On the other side, the M1909/30 was rugged and reliable. It was also relatively light and could be set up for combat in 30–40 seconds. Thanks to it, the howitzer was well liked in the RKKA.

In 1930 the Soviet Union still was not ready for development and mass production of modern artillery, so the upgrade of old guns was a reasonable decision.

== Ammunition ==
When set to fragmentation action, the OF-530 produced fragments which covered an area 70 m wide and 30 m deep. When set to HE action, the exploding shell produced a crater about 3.5 m in diameter and about 1.2 m deep.

Available ammunition
Type	Model	Weight	HE weight	Muzzle velocity, m/s	Range, m
Anti-concrete shells
Anti-concrete shell	G-530 / G-530Sh	40.0 kg (88 lb)	5.1 kg (11 lb)
High explosive and fragmentation shells
HE-Fragmentation, steel	OF-530	40.0 kg (88 lb)	5.47–6.86 kg (12–15 lb)
HE-Fragmentation, steely iron	OF-530A	40.0 kg (88 lb)	5.66 kg (12 lb)
HE, old	F-533	40.41 kg (89 lb)	8.0 kg (18 lb)
HE, old	F-533K	40.68 kg (90 lb)	7.3 kg (16 lb)
HE, old	F-533N	41.0 kg (90 lb)	7.3 kg (16 lb)
HE, old	F-533U	40.8 kg (90 lb)	8.8 kg (19 lb)
HE, steely iron, old French	F-534F	41.1 kg (91 lb)	3.9 kg (9 lb)
HE for 152-mm mortar model 1931	F-521	41.7 kg (92 lb)	7.7 kg (17 lb)
HE, British, for Vickers 152-mm howitzer	F-531	44.91 kg (99 lb)	5.7 kg (13 lb)
Shrapnel shells
Shrapnel with 45 sec. tube	Sh-501	41.16–41.83 kg (91–92 lb)	0.5 (680—690 bullets)
Shrapnel with Т-6 tube	Sh-501T	41.16 kg (91 lb)	0.5 (680—690 bullets)
Illumination shells
Illumination, 40 sec.	S 1	40.2 kg (89 lb)
Chemical shells
Fragmentation-chemical gun shell	OH-530	38.8 kg (86 lb)
Chemical howitzer shell	HN-530	39.1 kg (86 lb)

== Surviving pieces ==
The gun can be seen:

- In Museum of Artillery and Engineering Forces, Saint Petersburg, Russia.
- In Artillery Museum in Hämeenlinna, Finland.
- The Cannons at Torp Museum in Ingå, Finland
