= Eero Kinnunen =

Estonian military personnel

Eero Kinnunen (born 2 August 1967) is an Estonian military officer (Colonel).

He has been the commander of Viru Infantry Battalion in the Estonian Defence Forces and Harju military district in the Estonian Defence League. In 2022 he was appointed Estonia's attache to Ukraine.

In 2004 he was awarded with Order of the Cross of the Eagle, V class.
