= Logistics Battalion (Estonia) =

Estonian military unit

- Logistikapataljon
- Insignia of the Logistics Battalion
- Active: 1919–1940; 1992–present
- Country: Estonia
- Branch: Estonian Land Forces
- Type: Military logistics
- Size: Battalion
- Part of: Estonian Division
- Garrison/HQ: Paldiski
- Anniversaries: 9 April
- Engagements: Estonian War of Independence

Commanders
- Current commander: Lieutenant colonel Tambet Mäe

The Logistics Battalion (Logistikapataljon) of the Estonian Division, is the main central unit of the Estonian Defence Forces which provides various logistical support. This battalion has a logistical role in the Estonian Defence Forces along with Combat Service Support Battalions of the Infantry Brigades of Estonian Land Forces.

== History ==
The modern Logistics Battalion of Estonia considers itself to be a continuation of the Auto-Tank Regiment of the interwar era. The Auto-Tank Regiment, which brought together the Estonian Army's armored cars and light tanks, was established under the leadership of Albert Ojassoni, on 9 April 1919. In 1923 there were various formed motorized military units which coalesced around the car-tank division of 1928. The task of modernizing this military unit fell to Colonel Jan Lutsar, who was the commander until 1934. The regiment was located in Tallinn, but his subordinate units were at various times in Valga, Jõhvi, Narva, Tapa, and Elva.

On 17 July 1940, The Red Army occupied Estonia. On 1 October, the 1940 Auto-Tank Regiment structure was dissolved by the Soviet authorities, and its engineering duties distributed. The Red Army take-over was not able to organize its medical equipment; then later the majority of the German occupying forces received some service from the medical equipment branch of this regiment.

In 1992 an act of the Estonian Defence Forces during the summer was to create: Automobile Company. In 1997 the: Defence Forces Motor Company was formed around the logistical units (battalions) in the rear areas. Then in 2002 the: Defence Logistics Battalion was formed, which was later amended, in 2005 to: Combat service support of the Defence Logistics Training Centre. From 2009 this structure bears the name of the entity: Logistics Battalion. In 2015 the Battalion was moved from barracks in Marja Street, Tallinn, to two modern barracks near the Ämari Air Base. In 2021 the battalion relocated to Paldiski garrison and handed over the Ämari barracks to the Headquarters Support and Signal Battalion.

== Role ==
The Logistics Battalion's main functions are to provide specialist training for the logistics units, to execute logistical tasks and military operations during wartime, to prepare the reserve units and to provide military assistance to the active units on the battlefield when in combat. In addition to these tasks, the battalion also supports and participates in the international military operations undertaken by the Estonian Armed Forces. It is responsible for the logistical support units, preparing any deployed elements for out-of-country or overseas operation, their departure and sustainability. In addition, the Logistics Battalion is tasked with ensuring the on-going preparedness of the Defence Forces Logistics Center. The Logistics Battalion also works in close cooperation with the Combat Service Support (CSS) Battalion of 1st Infantry Brigade and Combat Service Support (CSS) Battalion of 2nd Infantry Brigade.

=== Structure ===
The Logistics Battalion structure:

- Battalion Staff
- Headquarters Company
- Logistics Company
- Rear Company

250 conscripts serve in the Logistics Battalion every year.

=== Symbols and flags ===
The Logistics Battalion emblem is a winged fire-bursting dragon on a violet shield, which is a symbol of strength and speed. It was once the Auto-Tank Regiment insignia. The symbol was re-adopted by the Defence Forces Automobile Company in 1996. The Defence Forces officially established the Defence Logistics Battalion badge on 13 March 1996. This Badge was originally designed as a sign of professionalism, technical excellence and teaching capability.

Today, the badge is given in recognition of outstanding and exemplary service in the Defence Logistics Battalion. As you can see from the history given above, this badge over time has carried many names up to: Department of Defence Forces General Headquarters of the Company. It is also called today by its historic name: Car Company badge. Military staff who have served in the Defence Logistics Battalion at least two years may be awarded the right to carry the badge. According to the statutes this badge may also be provided to supervisors rendering commendable service to the Defence Logistics Battalion who served at least three years, as well as conscripts who have proven their professional ambition, and for good academic performance.

== Equipment ==
The Logistics Battalion is equipped with various transport and recovery vehicles which include:

- MAN 6x6 and 8x8 fuel, cargo trucks
- DAF fuel, cargo trucks, evacuation prime movers
- MB Unimog and MB1017 medical trucks
- MB GD medical first aid vans

== See also ==
- CSS Battalion of the 1st Infantry Brigade
- CSS Battalion of the 2nd Infantry Brigade
