= 152 mm howitzer M1909 =

Russian howtizer

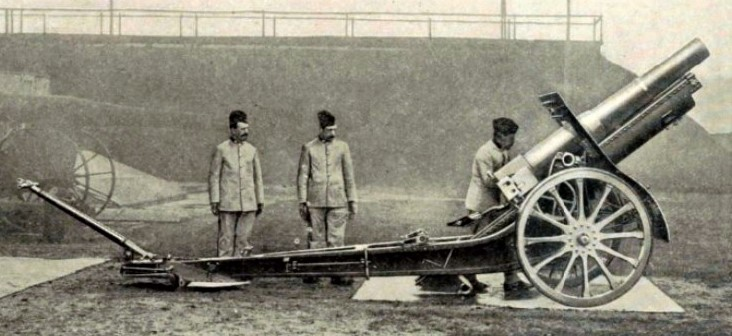
- A M1909 from a Schneider-Creusot Arms catalog 1914-1918.
- Type: Howitzer
- Place of origin: Russian Empire

Service history
- Used by: Russian Empire; Soviet Union
- Wars: World War I, Russian Civil War

Production history
- Designer: Schneider et Cie
- No. built: 240

Specifications
- Barrel length: overall: 2.16 m (7 ft 1 in) L/14 bore: 1.9 m (6 ft 3 in) L/13.1
- Caliber: 152.4 mm (6 in)
- Breech: interrupted screw
- Recoil: Hydro-pneumatic
- Carriage: Box trail
- Elevation: 0° to 41°
- Traverse: 2°50’

The 152 mm howitzer M1909 (Russian: 152-мм гаубица обр. 1909 г.) was a Russian 152.4 mm (6 inch) howitzer. Developed by the French arms manufacturer Schneider et Cie, it saw service throughout World War I.

Initially, it was classified as fortress howitzer (Russian: kryepostnaya gaubitsa), compared to the lighter Schneider design, 152 mm howitzer M1910, which was adopted as a field howitzer. However, during World War I it started to be used as a field howitzer as well. It was later developed by the Soviet Union into the 152 mm howitzer M1909/30 which saw service throughout the Great Patriotic War.

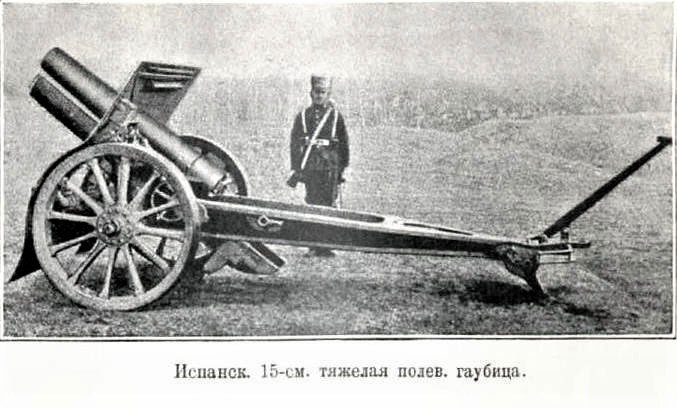
A M1909 from Military Encyclopedia. Vol. 3 (Saint-Petersburg; 1911).

== See also ==
- 120 mm Armata wz. 78/09/31 – Polish gun which used the carriage of the M1909.
