= Viru Infantry Battalion =

Estonian military unit

- Viru jalaväepataljon
- Insignia of the Viru Infantry Battalion
- Active: 1917–1918; 1918–1940; 1992–present
- Country: Estonia
- Branch: Estonian Land Forces
- Type: Mechanized infantry
- Role: Anti-tank warfare
- Size: Battalion
- Part of: 1st Infantry Brigade
- Garrison/HQ: Jõhvi
- Motto: Üks nelja eest ("One for four!")
- Anniversaries: Formed: 6 December; Restored: 22 May
- Engagements: Estonian War of Independence

Commanders
- Current commander: Lieutenant Colonel Margus Mikk
- Notable commanders: Aleksander Seimann; Jakob Vende

Insignia
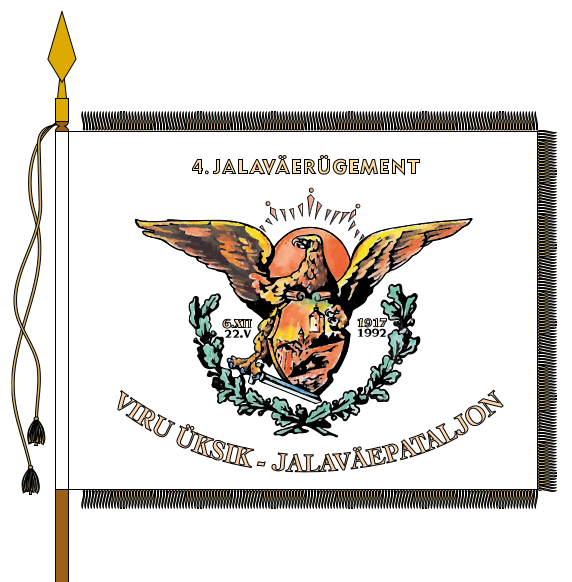
- Flag

The Viru Infantry Battalion (Estonian: Viru jalaväepataljon) is a battalion of the Estonian Land Forces. It is a part of the 1st Infantry Brigade and its primary task is to train conscription-based infantry and anti-tank units. The battalion has been previously known as the 4th Infantry Regiment and as the 4th Single Infantry Battalion. The battalion is currently based at Jõhvi.

== History ==
=== Formation ===
On 6 December 1917, Lieutenant colonel Jaan Soots, acting commander of the 1st Division, ordered Captain Hendrik Vahtramäe to form the 4th Infantry Regiment (Estonian: 4. eesti polk) in Rakvere. Following the occupation of Estonia by the German Empire, the 4th Infantry Regiment was disbanded on 5 April 1918. After the German occupation ended, the unit was re-established in Narva on 21 November 1918.

=== Estonian War of Independence ===
On 28 November 1918, the 6th Division of the Red Army attacked the positions of the 4th Infantry Regiment at Narva. The regiment had just 595 men in 2 battalions, and together with few hundred Estonian Defence League members, the regiment was forced to leave Narva and retreat west. On 4 January 1919, units of 4th Infantry Regiment managed to stop the advancing Red Army at Valkla. The regiment took part in the following counter-offensive and liberated Narva on 19 January 1919. By the end of the war, the regiment had 53 officers, and 1476 NCOs and soldiers in its ranks, and was commanded by Colonel Jakob Vende.

=== 1920–1940 ===
After demobilization the unit was renamed 4th Single Infantry Battalion, and was based at Narva-Jõesuu. On 1 April 1924, the battalion was added to the 5th Infantry Regiment at Narva. On 1 October 1928, most units of 4th Single Infantry Battalion were moved to Jõhvi and Kurtna, while one infantry and one machine gun platoon took positions at Vasknarva. From 1 October to 28 October 1928, the regiment was commanded by Voldemar Karl Koch. After the Soviet occupation in 1940 the battalion was disbanded.

=== 1992–present ===
On 22 May 1992, the unit was restored as Viru Infantry Battalion in Jõhvi. The battalion participates in training conscripts for mechanized infantry and anti-tank units. The battalion is currently equipped with MILAN 2, FGM-148 Javelin anti-tank missiles and Patria Pasi XA-188 APCs.

== Current structure ==
Viru Infantry Battalion:

- Battalion Headquarters
  - 1st Training Company
  - 2nd Training Company
  - 3rd Training Company
  - Staff and Combat Service Support Company

== List of commanders ==
- Hendrik Vahtramäe 1917–1918
- Aleksander Seimann 1918–1919
- Jakob Vende 1919–1928
- Voldemar Koch 1928–1934
- August Tomander 1934–1940
- Peeter Prans 1992–1993
- Indrek Sirel 1993–1996
- Jüri Järveläinen 1996–2004
- Neeme Kaarna 2004–2006
- Urmet Reimann 2006–2010
- Janno Märk 2010–2012
- Eero Kinnunen 2013–2015
- Arno Kruusmann 2015–2019
- Tarvo Luga 2019-2022
- Viljar Laaneste 2022–2024
- Margus Sander 2024–2026
- Margus Mikk 2026–present

== See also ==
- 1st Infantry Brigade
