= Auto-Tank Regiment =

- Auto-tanki rügement
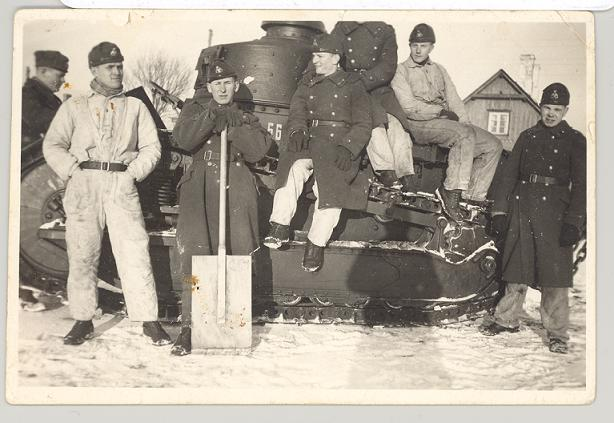
- Tankers posing on a Renault FT17, c. 1936
- Founded: 9 April 1919
- Disbanded: October 1940
- Country: Estonia
- Branch: Estonian Army
- Type: Armored warfare
- Size: Column (1919–1923); Division (1923–1928); Regiment (1928–1940)
- Garrison/HQ: Tallinn
- Engagements: Estonian War of Independence

Commanders
- First commander: August Nieländer (1919)
- Last commander: Johannes Vellerind (1940)

The Auto-Tank Regiment (Estonian: Auto-tanki rügement) was the armored warfare branch of the Estonian Army from 1918 to 1940. It existed from the Estonian War of Independence until the Soviet occupation.

== History ==
=== Establishment ===
The Auto-Tank Regiment was established on 9 April 1919 as an irregular armored column.

Shortly after the beginning of the Estonian War of Independence, navy commander Johan Pitka ordered the creation of armored vehicles as well as armored trains. Seven such cars were built in Tallinn, one was built in Pärnu, and two more were built for carrying artillery. Later, four more were obtained: three from the Estonian Reds, and one from the White Russian Northwestern Army.

The Auto-Tank Regiment was highly effective in combat; combined with cavalry, the Estonian forces had the capability to be highly mobile.

In the years following, 12 FT 17 light tanks were purchased from Renault in France.

=== Mark V tanks ===
When the Northwestern Army capitulated, the Auto-Tank Regiment obtained their Mark V Composite tanks.

A British contingent of 89 soldiers had been installed in Estonia in 1919, and their commander, Hubert Gough, assisted the Estonians with military planning. There were four Mark V's in Estonian service, and were initially to be operated by the White Russian forces. After various White Russian defeats in 1919, British and French leadership viewed the support as too costly, and decided to repurpose them for the Estonian war effort. The tanks were garrisoned in Narva when they were transferred to Estonian service.

=== Expansion and later years ===
In 1924, 13 Arsenal Crossley M27/28 cars were sent to Estonia from England. They were armored locally, and equipped with either Madsen machine guns or 37MM Hotchkiss guns.

In 1923, the unit was renamed to the Auto-Tank Division, and in 1928 it became the Auto-Tank Regiment, its longest serving designation. During this period, the unit was headquartered in Tallinn.

During the mid-1930s, the regiment acquired six TKS tankettes from Poland.

By October 1940, the regiment's expansion plans had failed, and most of the armored fleet was practically inoperable. When the Soviet Union occupied Estonia that same month, the regiment disbanded fully, with few vehicles being repurposed into Red Army service.

== Equipment ==
- Mark V Composite tanks (4 in service)
- TKS tankette (6 in service)
- Arsenal Crossley (13 in service)

== List of commanders ==
- August Nieländer (1919)
- Albert Ojasson (1919)
- Hans Vanaveski (1919–1923)
- Jaan Lutsar (1923–1934)
- Jakob Vende (1934)
- Mart Tuisk (1934–1936)
- Johannes Remmel (1936–1939)
- Jaan Pinding (1939)
- Johannes Vellerind (1940)
