= Canon de 75 modèle 1912 Schneider =

Canon de 75mm Modele 1912
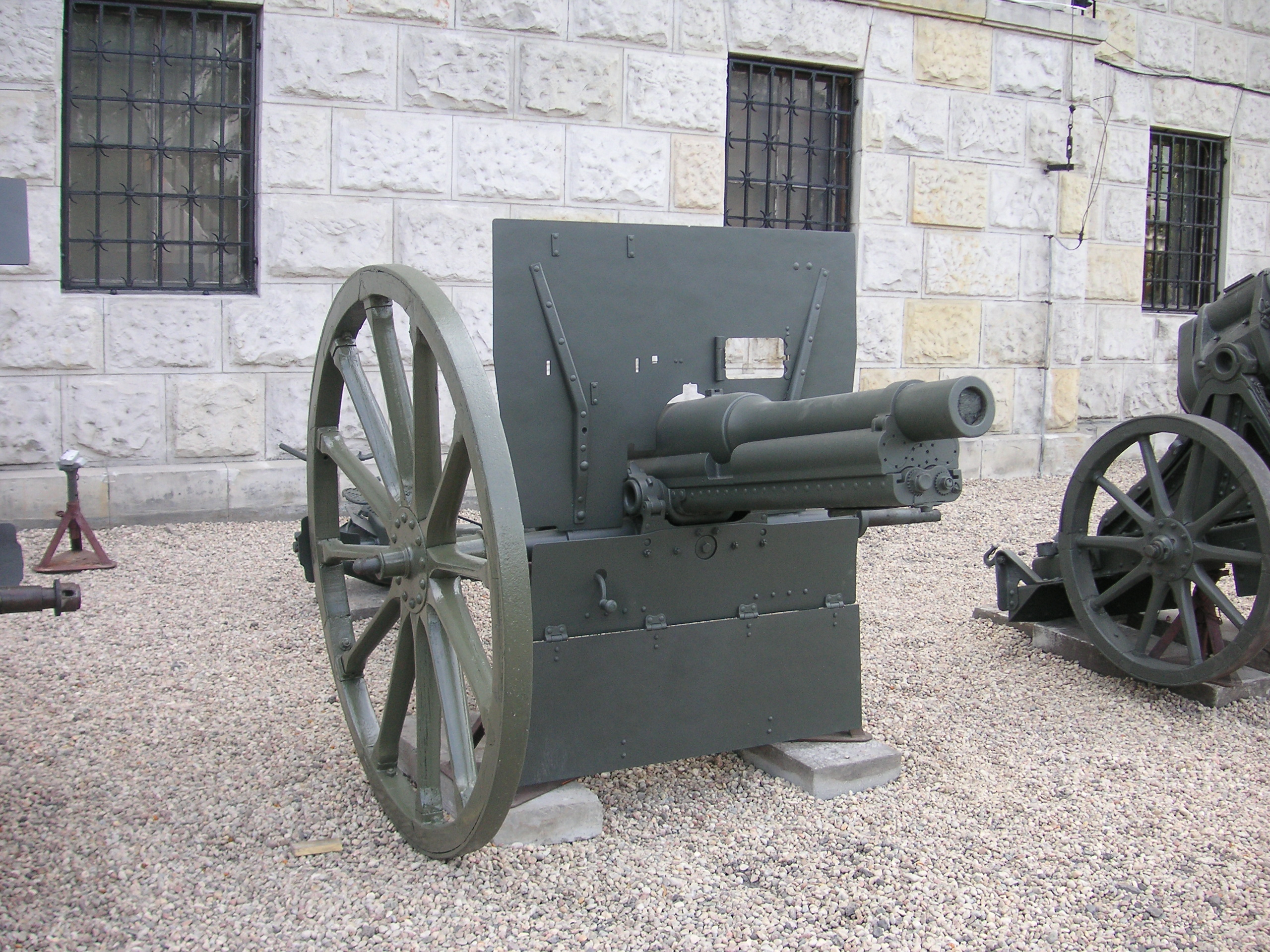
- Canon de 75 Modèle 1912 on exhibit at the Polish Army Museum in Warsaw
- Type: Regimental artillery field gun
- Place of origin: France

Service history
- In service: 1912–1930s
- Used by: France, Poland, Serbia, Romania, Kingdom of Yugoslavia
- Wars: World War I, Polish-Soviet War

Production history
- Manufacturer: Schneider
- Produced: 1912–1917?

Specifications
- Mass: 965 kg (2,127 lbs)
- Crew: 6
- Shell: high-explosive, shrapnel
- Shell weight: 5.50–7.20 kg (12.12–16 lbs)
- Caliber: 75 mm (2.95 in)
- Carriage: horse-drawn
- Rate of fire: 12–15/min
- Effective firing range: 9,500 m (10,389 yds)

The Canon de 75 modele 1912 Schneider was a French World War I piece of 75 mm artillery, designed and manufactured by Schneider et Cie in Le Creusot. It entered service with the French horse-mounted artillery in 1912 and a number were sold to the army of Serbia. By the end of the war, all guns in French service were replaced with the more successful and standardised Canon de 75 modèle 1897. The remaining guns were then sold to Poland, where they were used in the Polish-Bolshevik War.

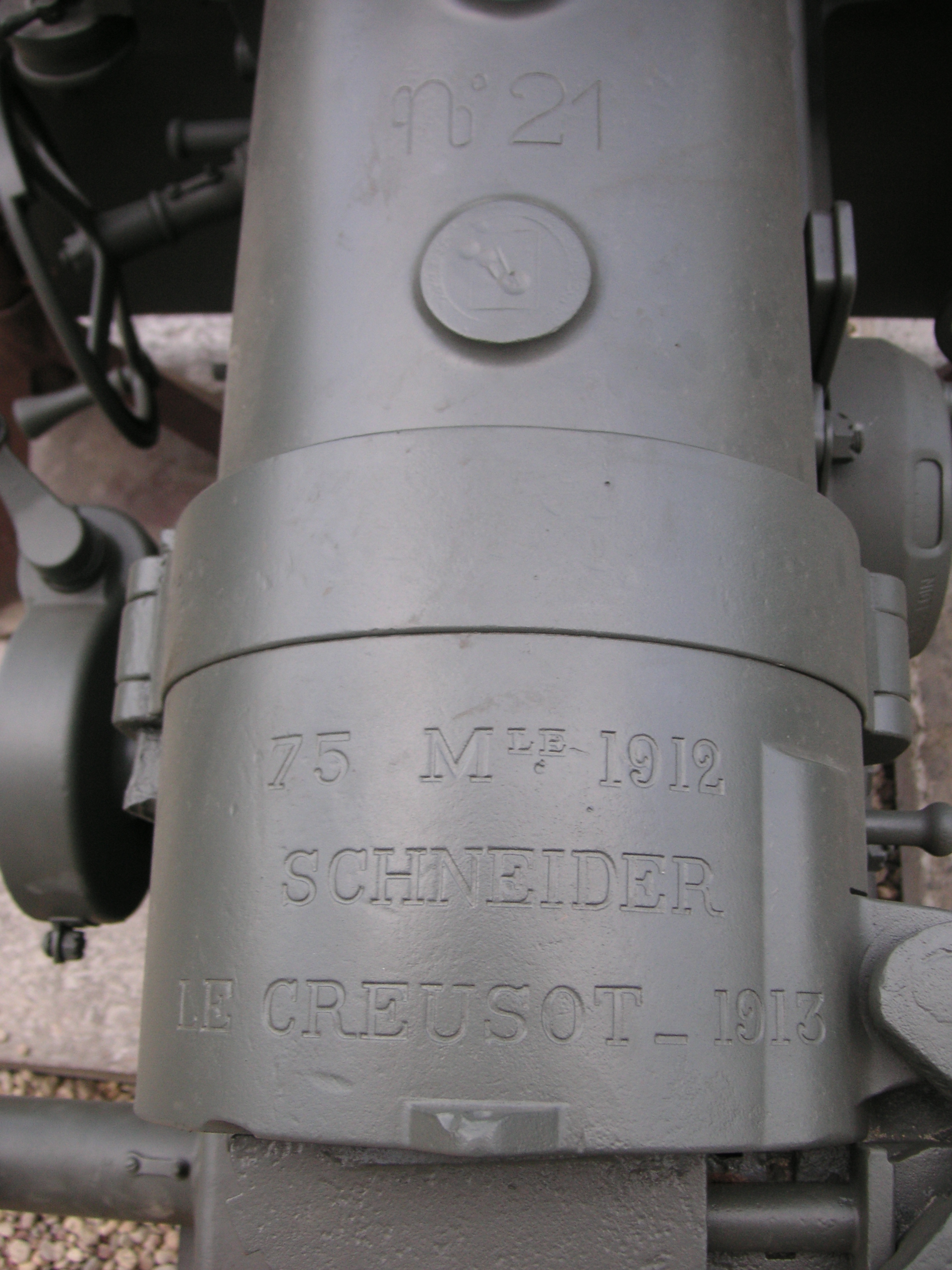
Barrel markings

== Bibliography ==
- Pierre Touzin et François Vauvillier (2009). Les canons de la victoire 1914–1918. Tome I: L'artillerie de campagne (in French). Paris: Histoire & collections. ISBN 978-2-35250-106-0. Touzin.
