= Schneider-Creusot =

French former steel-making, armaments and locomotive manufacturer

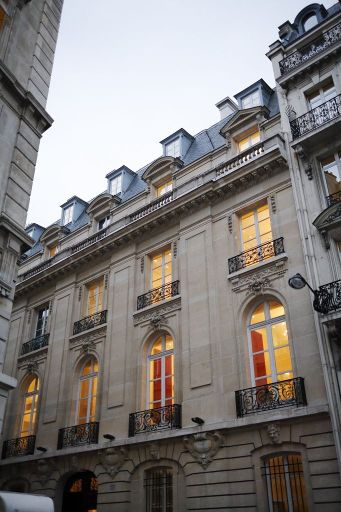
Building at 42, rue d'Anjou in Paris, built in 1899 on a design by Ernest-Paul Sanson, head office of Schneider et Compagnie from 1900 to the late 1940s; now head office of Banque Palatine

Schneider et Compagnie, also known as Schneider-Creusot for its birthplace in the French town of Le Creusot, was a historic iron and steel-mill company which became a major arms manufacturer. In the 1960s, it was taken over by the Belgian Empain group and merged with it in 1969 to form Empain-Schneider, which in 1980 was renamed Schneider SA and in 1999, after much restructuring, Schneider Electric.

== Origins ==
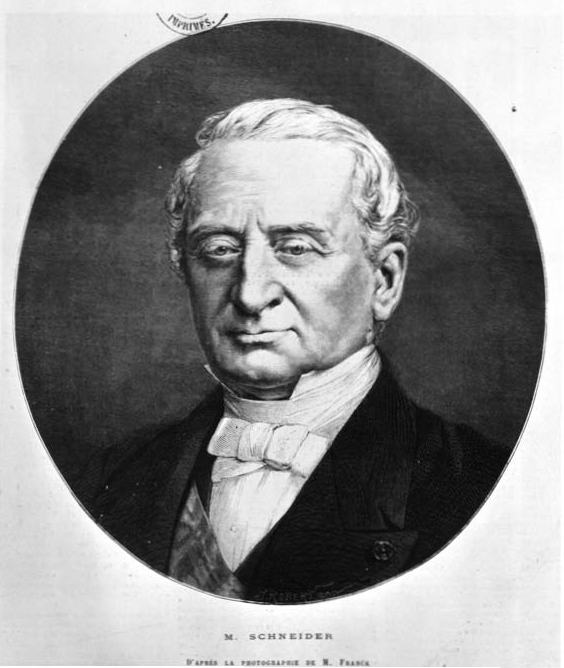
Eugène Schneider (1805–1875)

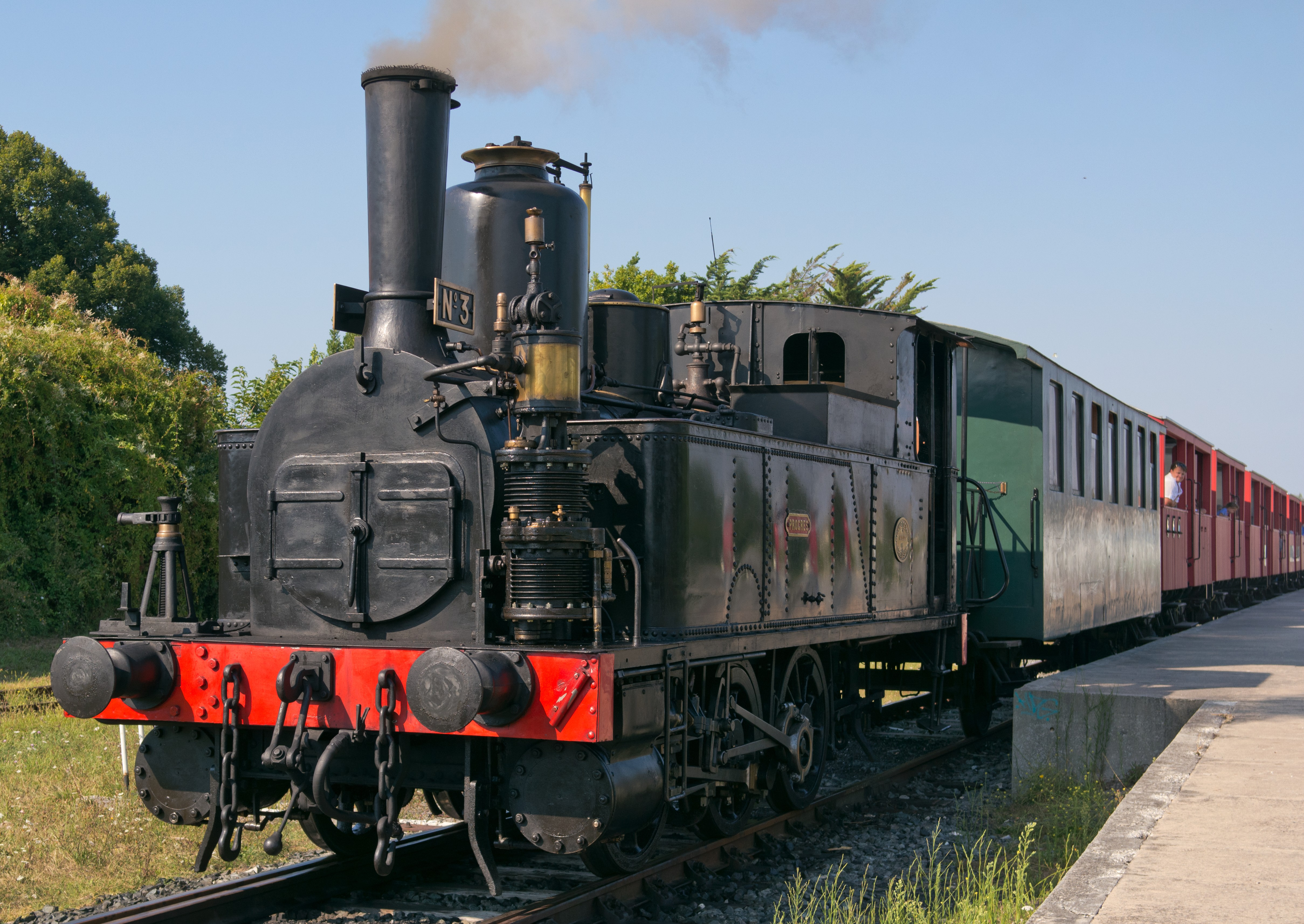
A Schneider-Creusot 030-T steam locomotive

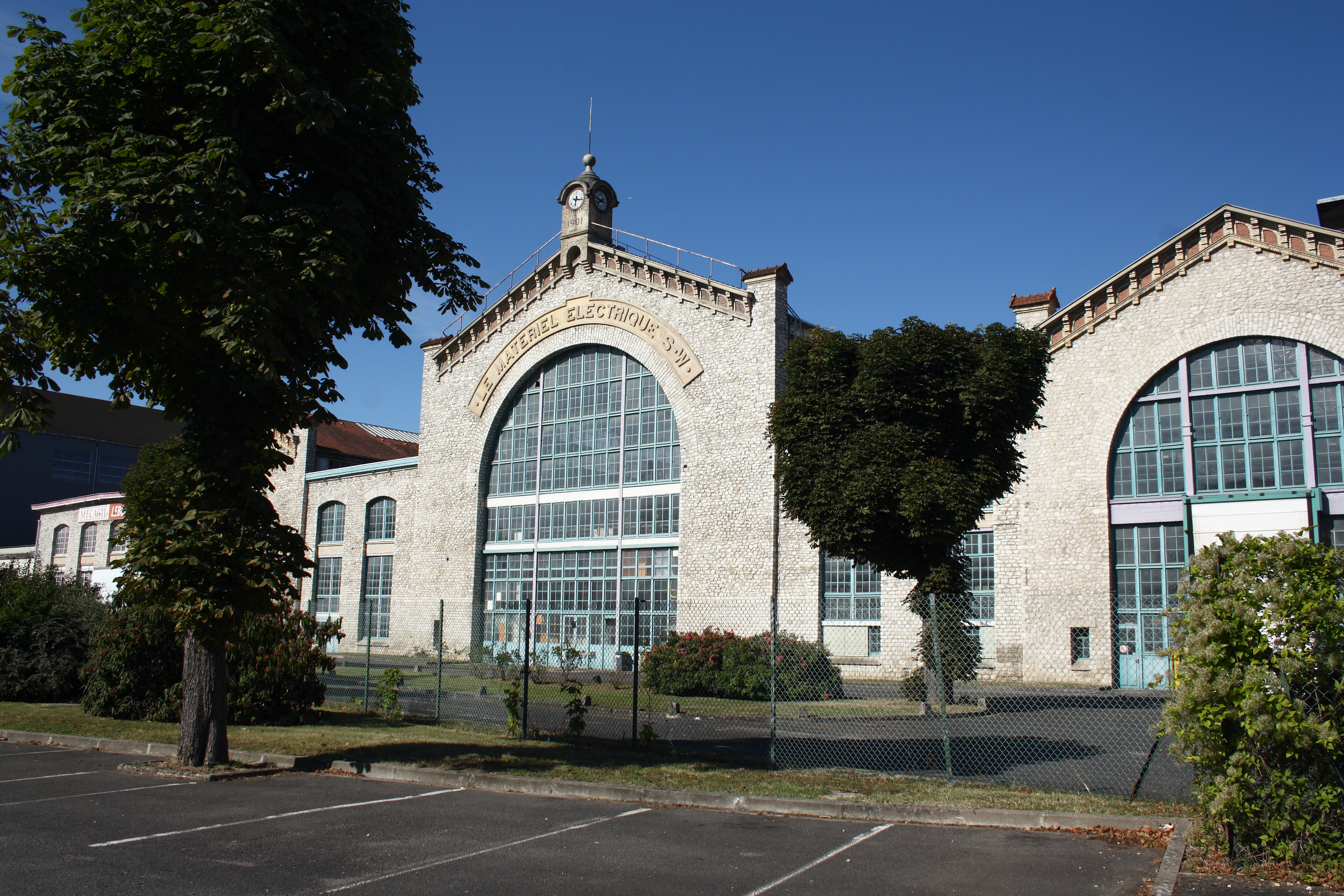
Former manufacturing facility of Le Matériel Electrique Schneider-Westinghouse in Champagne-sur-Seine

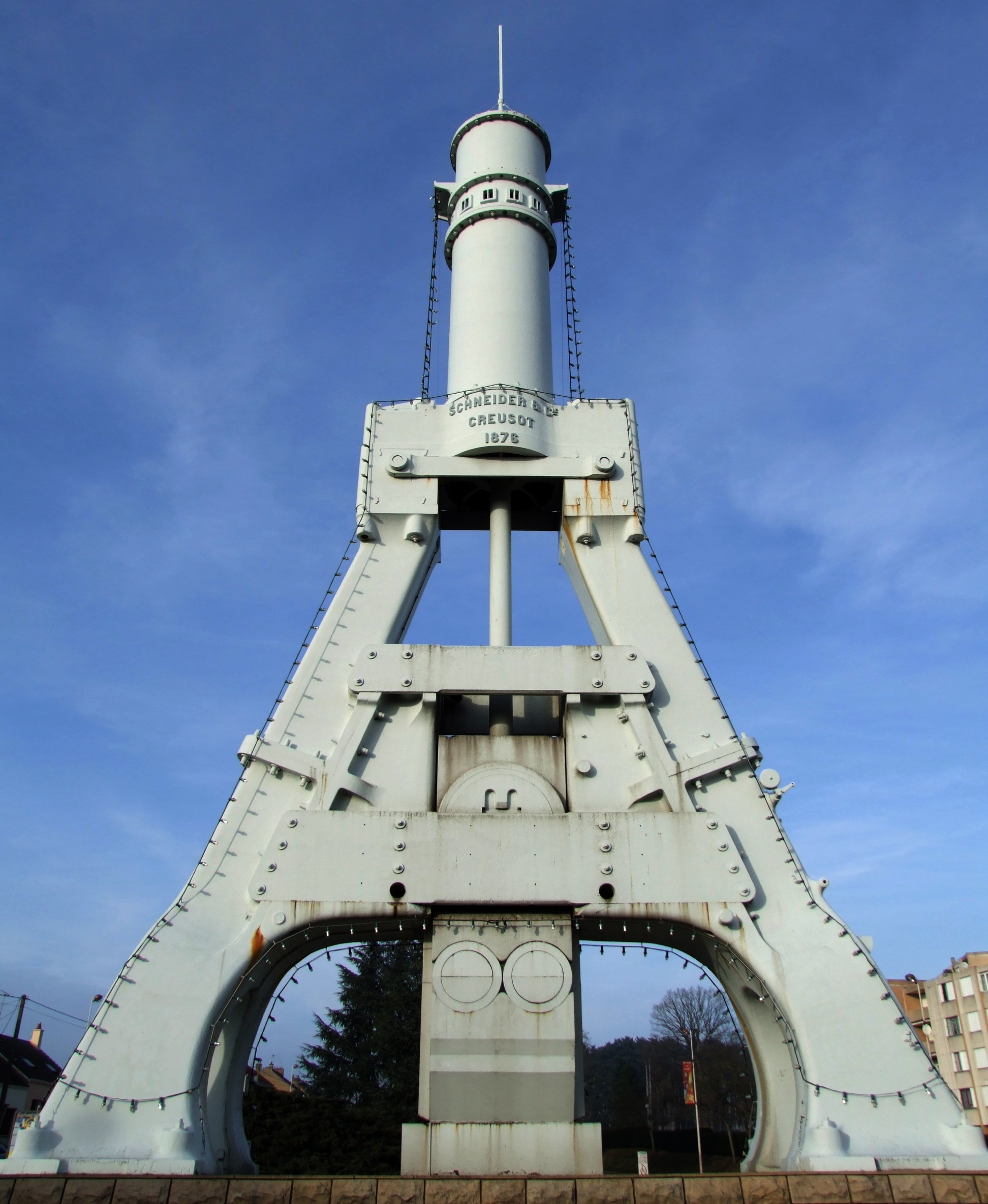
Creusot steam hammer

In 1836, Adolphe Schneider and his brother Eugène Schneider bought iron-ore mines and forges at Le Creusot (Saône-et-Loire). They developed a business dealing in steel, railways, armaments, and shipbuilding.

The Creusot steam hammer was built in 1877.

Somua, a subsidiary located near Paris, made machinery and vehicles, including the SOMUA S35 tank.

== Armaments ==
=== Vehicles ===
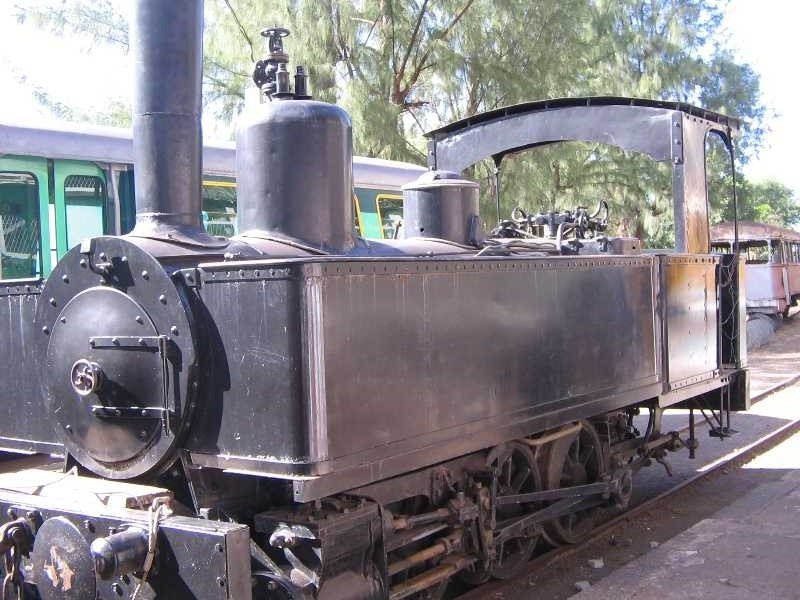
Locomotive Schneider.030T

- Schneider CA1, the first French tank
- Schneider-Creusot 030-T steam locomotive
- Schneider Coast Defense Train

=== Ships ===
- Ferré-class submarines, a pair of 46-metre (151 ft) long submarines in service with the Peruvian Navy
- Calypso (Q126), a Circé-class submarine

=== Mountain guns ===
- 75 mm Schneider-Danglis 06/09 (named after Panagiotis Danglis)
- Canon de 75 M(montagne) modele 1919 Schneider
- Canon de 75 M(montagne) modele 1928
- 76 mm mountain gun modèle 1909

=== Other artillery ===
- Canet guns
- Canon de 75 modèle 1897
- Canon de 75 modèle 1905 Schneider
- Canon de 75 modèle 1912 Schneider
- Canon de 75 modèle 1914 Schneider
- Canon anti-aérien de 75mm modèle 1939
- Canon de 85 modèle 1927 Schneider
- Canon de 105 modèle 1930 Schneider
- 107 mm gun modèle 1910
- 120 mm Schneider-Canet M1897 long gun
- 122 mm howitzer modèle 1910
- 152 mm howitzer modèle 1909
- 152 mm howitzer modèle 1910
- 152 mm siege gun modèle 1910
- 155 mm Creusot Long Tom
- Canon de 155 C modèle 1917 Schneider
- Canon de 194 mle GPF
- Canon de 220 L mle 1917
- Mortier de 220 modèle 1915/1916 Schneider
- Mortier de 280 modèle 1914 Schneider

== Schneider Trophy ==
Starting in 1911, Jacques Schneider offered the Schneider Trophy. It was a competition for seaplanes, with a large and prestigious prize.

== See also ==
- Forges et Chantiers de la Gironde, part of the Schneider group between 1882 and 1927
- Somua, a truck manufacturer acquired by Schneider in 1914 and sold to Renault in 1955
- De Wendel family, long-standing competitors of the Schneiders
- Société Métallurgique de Normandie
