= Armored Train Regiment (Estonia) =

Former military unit of Estonia

- Soomusrongirügement
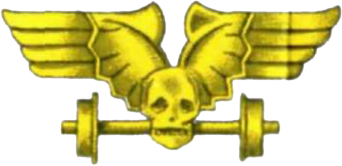
- Collar tab of the Armored Train Regiment, showing wings, a skull, and train wheels.
- Active: 1934–1941
- Country: Estonia
- Role: Armored warfare
- Size: 544 men (1939)
- Part of: 1st Division
- Garrison/HQ: Tapa, Estonia
- Colors: Bright Red
- Anniversaries: November 29
- Equipment: 3 armored trains 16 artillery wagons 3 long-range artillery

Commanders
- Commanders: Colonel Voldemar Karl Koch (1936–1940); Colonel Erich Johann Friedrich Toffer (1940–1941)

The Armored Train Regiment (Estonian: Soomusrongirügement) was an armored regiment of the Estonian Defense Forces from 1934–1940. In 1939, the strength of the regiment was 544 men. The symbol of the regiment was a skull with wings on train wheels, symbolizing how armored trains fought in the Estonian Independence War.

== History ==
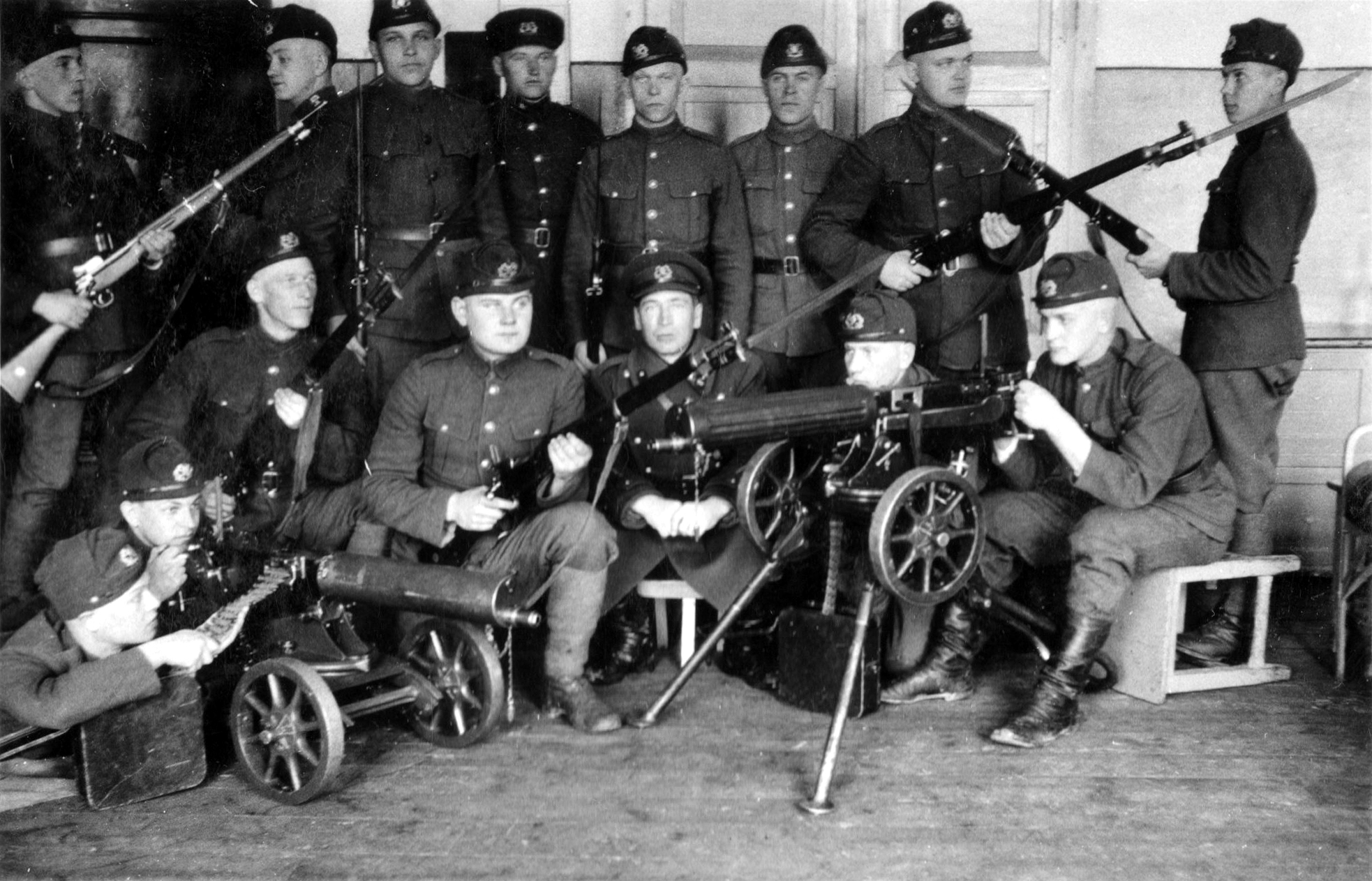
Conscripts of the Armored Train Regiment in 1938 or 1939

=== Creation ===
The Armored Train Regiment was created on November 30, 1934, when the 1st Armored Train Regiment in Tapa was merged with the 2nd Armored Train Regiment into the Armored Train Regiment in Tapa.

=== Sports ===
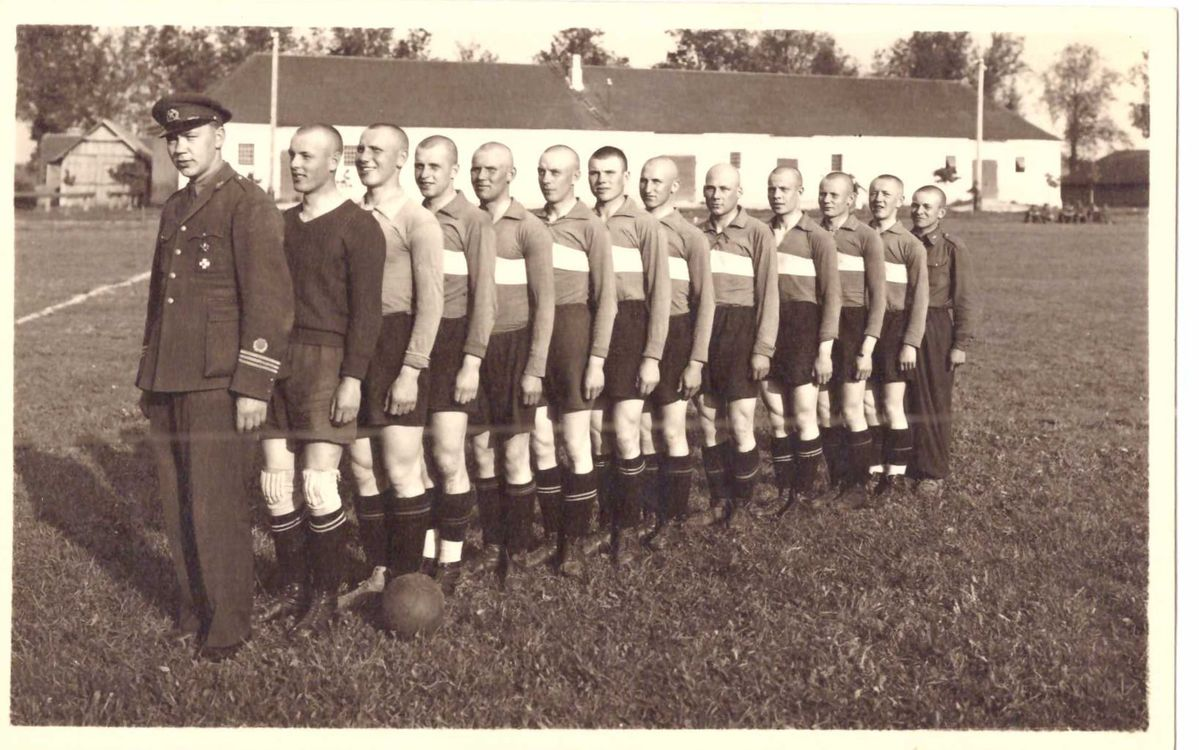
The regiment's football team in 1935

In 1938, the regiment participated in 27 sports competitions, including 16 football matches, of which the regiment won 11. The regiment was also involved in shooting sports.

=== 20th Anniversary ===
On November 29, 1938, the Armored Train Regiment celebrated the 20th anniversary of the armored trains of Estonia, which date back to 1918 during the Estonian Independence War. Major General Aleksander Pulk, commander of the 1st Division spoke at the regiment's sports field. Around 100 veterans who were personnel of the armored trains during the Independence war attended. A parade was held on the regiment's sports field. Lunch was offered to the veterans after the parade. Colonel Karl Parts, who led and organized armored trains during the Independence War, gave a speech about Rear Admiral Johan Pitka, who is often called "the father of the armored trains". Parts ended his speech by remembering the fallen personnel of the Armored trains in the Independence War and the actions of Captain Anton Irv, who died in 1919. Other military figures, including General Johan Laidoner, Lieutenant general Paul Lill, and Lieutenant general Nikolai Reek sent telegrams. The celebration continued until the next day on November 30, 1938.

=== Disbandment of the regiment ===
In June 1940, the Soviet Union invaded and annexed Lithuania, Latvia, and Estonia. The Estonian army was formed into the 22nd Rifle Corps and the 22nd Territorial Rifle Corps of the Red Army. The regiment was dissolved and it's artillery cannons were transferred to Russia. During the June Deportation, the regiment's commander from 1936 to 1940, Voldemar Karl Koch (later Koht), was arrested and deported to Siberia in June 1941. Koch was executed in Norilsk in September 1942. The regiment's commander from 1940 to 1941, Erich Johann Friedrich Toffer, was arrested and deported by the NKVD. Toffer died later in 1945.

== Organisation ==
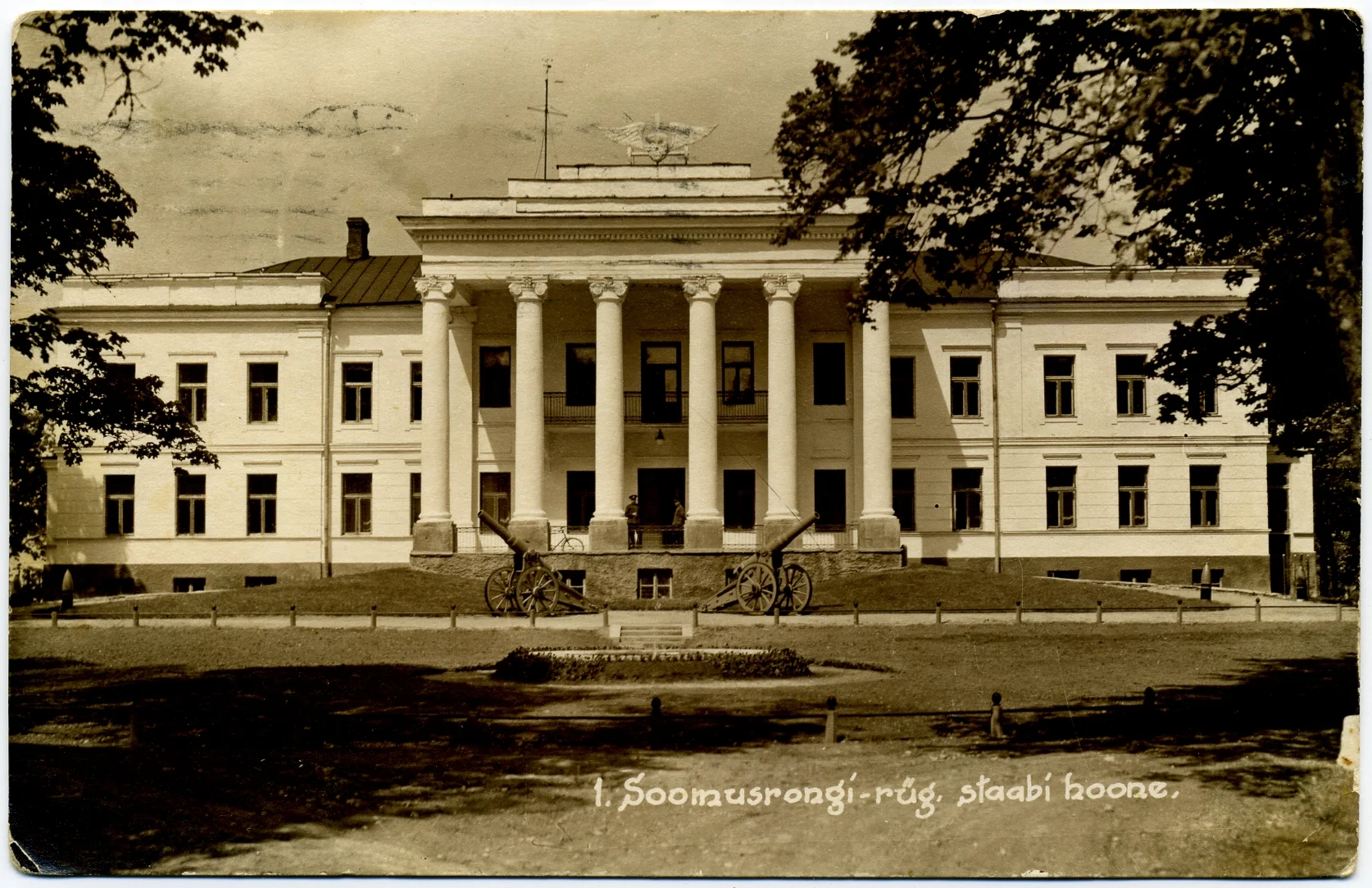
Headquarters building of the Estonian Armored Train Regiment in the former Tapa manor house

The regiment was located in Tapa, and it consisted of two divisions, each with their own machine gun and infantry companies:

=== First Division ===
The First Division consisted of 2 armored trains, a machine gun company, and infantry company.

==== Armored Trains ====
The armored train(s) of the First Division was Broad-gauge armored train "Kapten Irv" (nr. 1) and Broad-gauge armored train nr. 2.

=== Second Division ===
The Second Division consisted of 1 armored train, a machine gun company, a heavy long-range artillery company, and infantry company. The Chief of Staff of the Second Division was the former commander Voldemar Karl Koht from 1940 to the occupation of Estonia during the Second World War.

==== Heavy Long Range Battery ====
The Heavy Long-Range Battery (Estonian: Raskekauglaskepatarei) was a long-range artillery unit, which included three artillery wagons. The cannons came from former naval artillery pieces. These artillery wagons were used for long range bombardment and could fire two times as farther than the cannons of the artillery wagons.

==== Armored Trains ====
The armored train(s) of the Second Division were Broad-gauge armored train nr. 3.

== Equipment ==
In 1940, the regiment had 16 Maxim M1910 heavy machine guns.

=== Cannons and artillery ===
In the late 1930s, the Armored Train Regiment had a total of 16 artillery wagons, 8 light, 4 mixed, 4 heavy artillery.: The regiment also had 3 naval artillery pieces

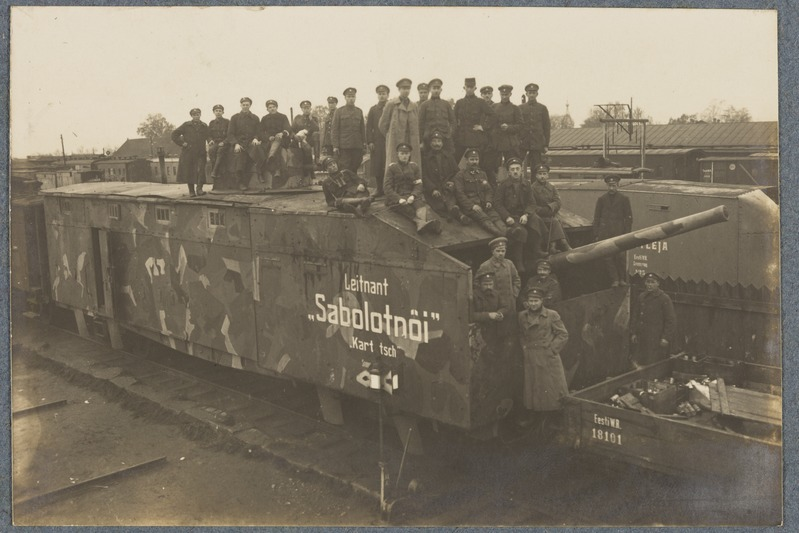
Artillery wagon "Sabolotnõi" in 1919

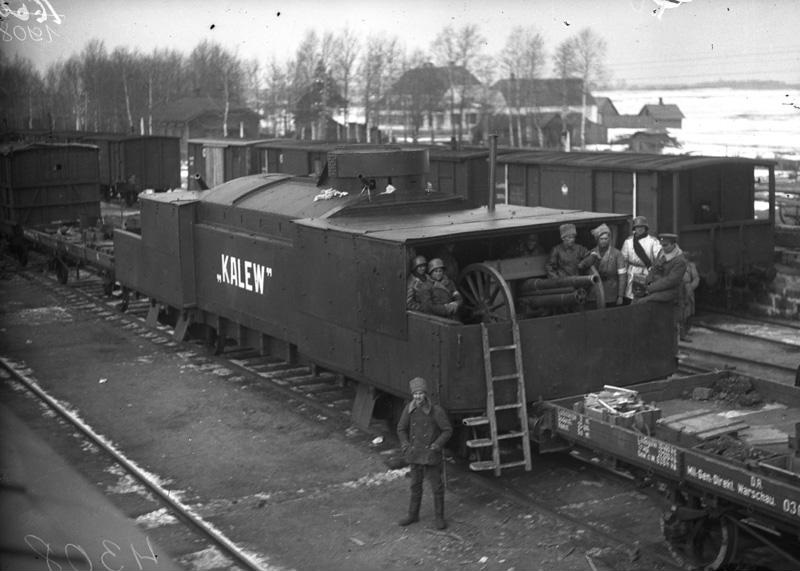
Artillery wagon "Kalev" in 1919 during the Independence War

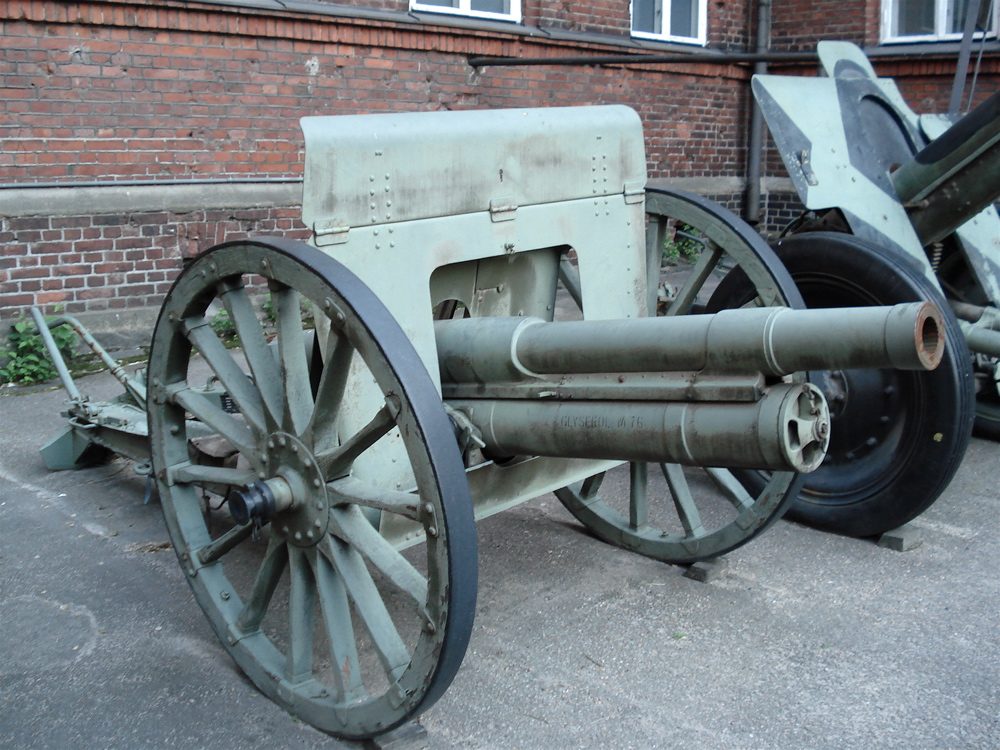
76mm M1902

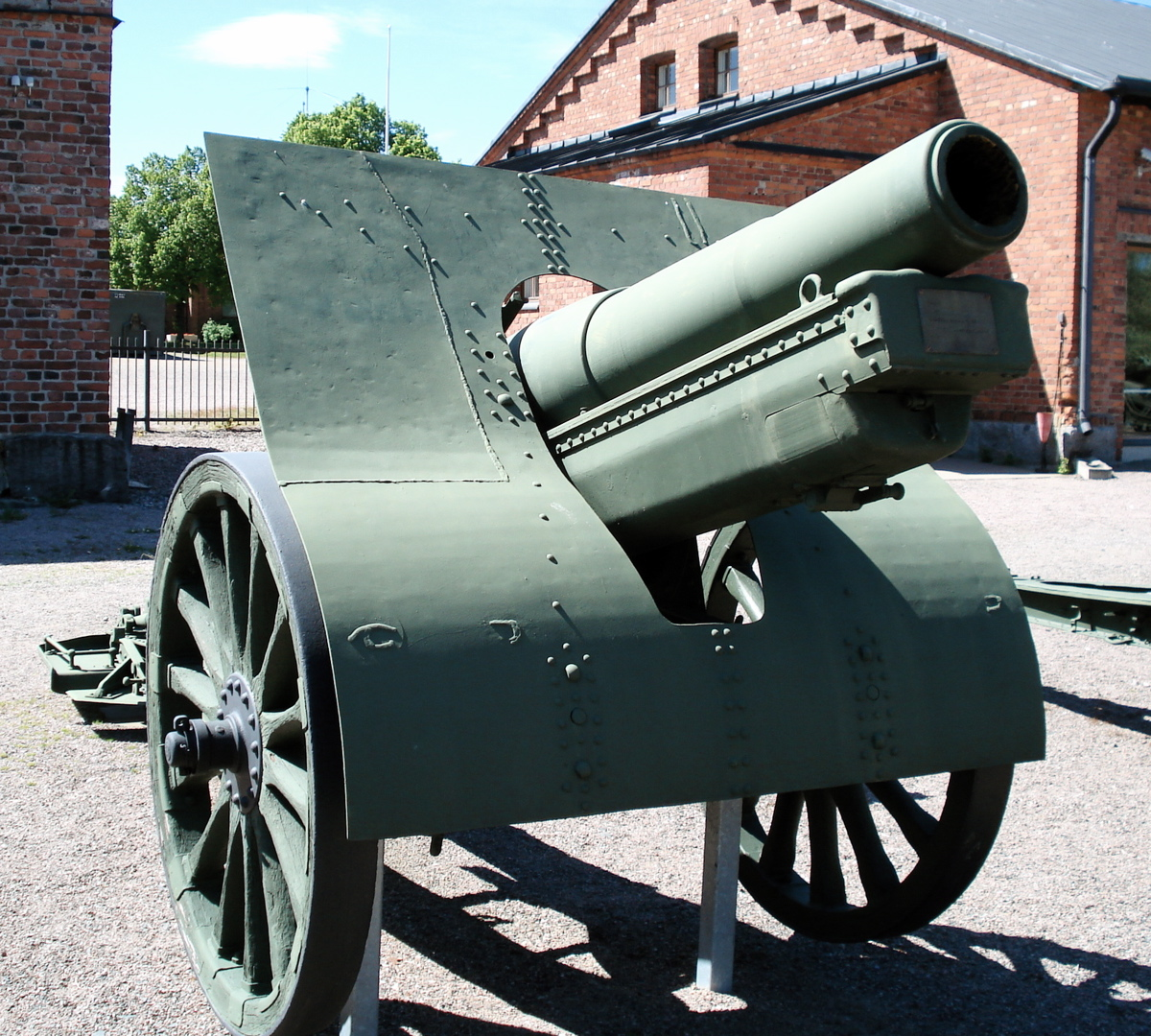
152mm M1909/30

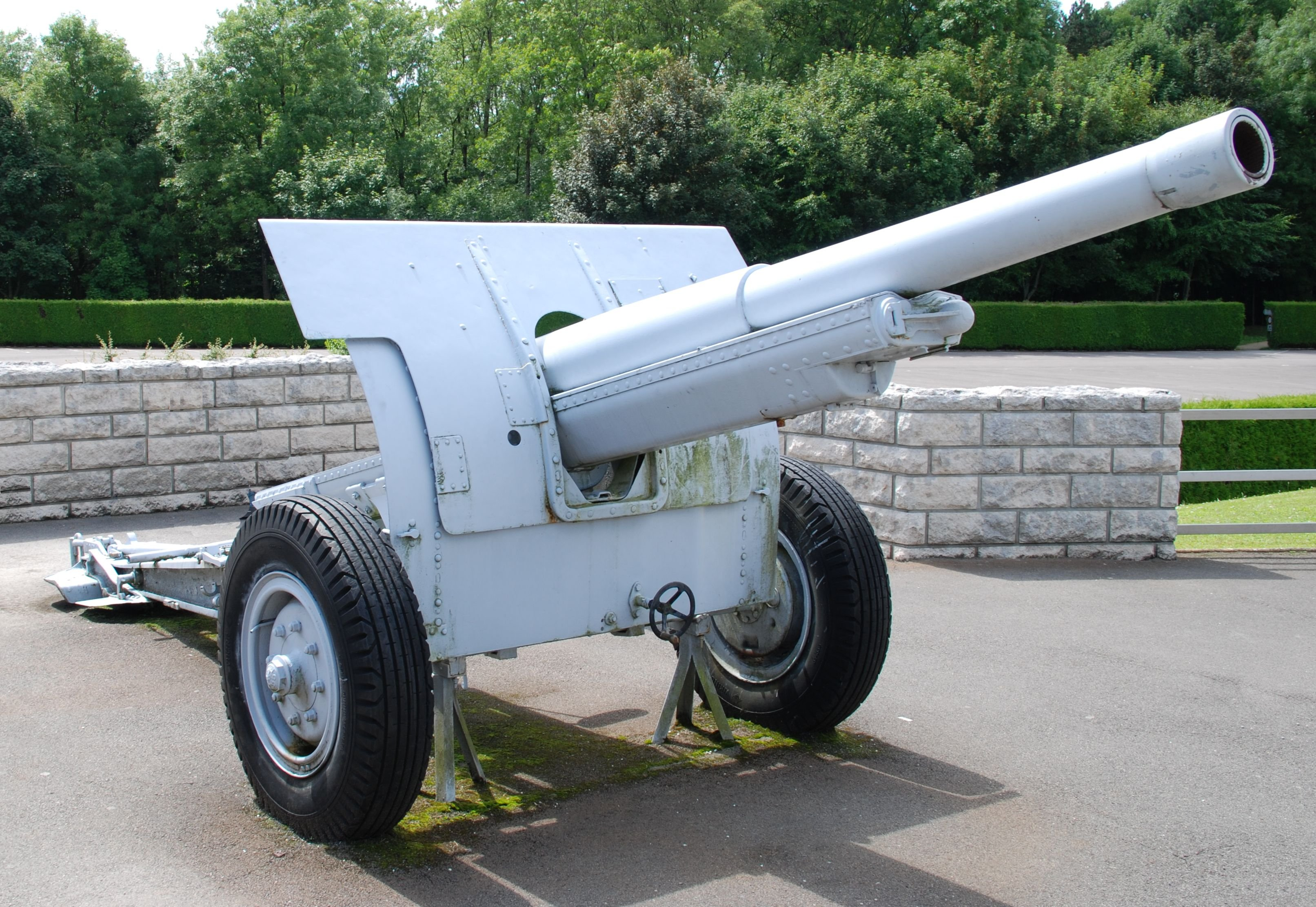
105mm 1913 Schneider

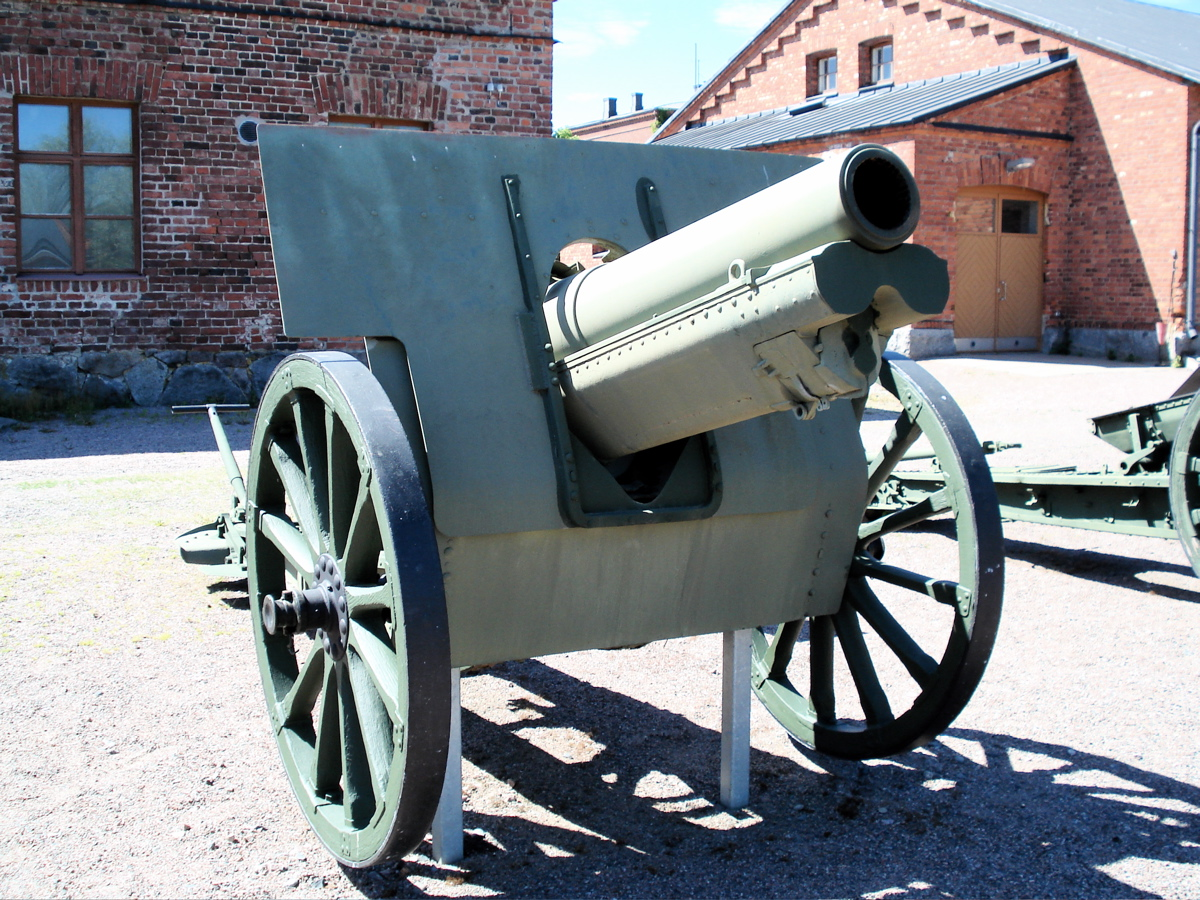
152mm M1910

Name (Note: Some of the artillery wagons names derive from Estonian military personnel (e.g Sabolotnõi) or figures in Estonian folklore (e.g Kalev, Vanapagan))	Year of Construction	Type	Armament
"Hävitaja"	1925	Light	two 76 mm M1902
"Vanapagan"	1925	Light	two 76 mm M1902
"Maru"	1925	Light	two 76 mm M1902
"Vapper"	1925	Light	two 76 mm M1902
"Võitleja"	1933	Light	two 76 mm M1902
"Tont"	1921	Light	two 76 mm M1902
"Taara"	1931	Light	two 76 mm M1902
"Uku"	1920	Light	two 76 mm M1902
"Pikker"	1920	Mixed	76 mm M1902, 105 mm 1913 Schnieder
"Kõu"	1932	Mixed	76 mm M1902, 105 mm 1913 Schnieder
"Sabolotnõi"	1919	Mixed	76 mm M1902, 105 mm 1913 Schnieder
"Tasuja"	1933	Mixed	120 mm English, 76 mm M1902
"Onu Tom"	1930	Heavy	two 152 mm M1909/30
"Lembit"	1931	Heavy	two 152 mm M1909/30
"Kalev" (Note: 'W' was used as 'V' in older spellings. (e.g Kalev, Kalew) See Estonian orthography)	1929	Heavy	two 152 mm M1910
"Tommi"	1928	Heavy	two 152 mm M1910
"Suur Tõll" (Note: Part of the "Heavy Long Range Battery" (Estonian: Raskekauglaskepatarei). Former naval artillery piece.)	1935	Long range artillery	152 mm Pattern 1892
"Müristaja"	1935	Long range artillery	102 mm Russian naval cannon
"Tapper"	1936	Long range artillery	102 mm Russian naval cannon

=== Armored trains ===
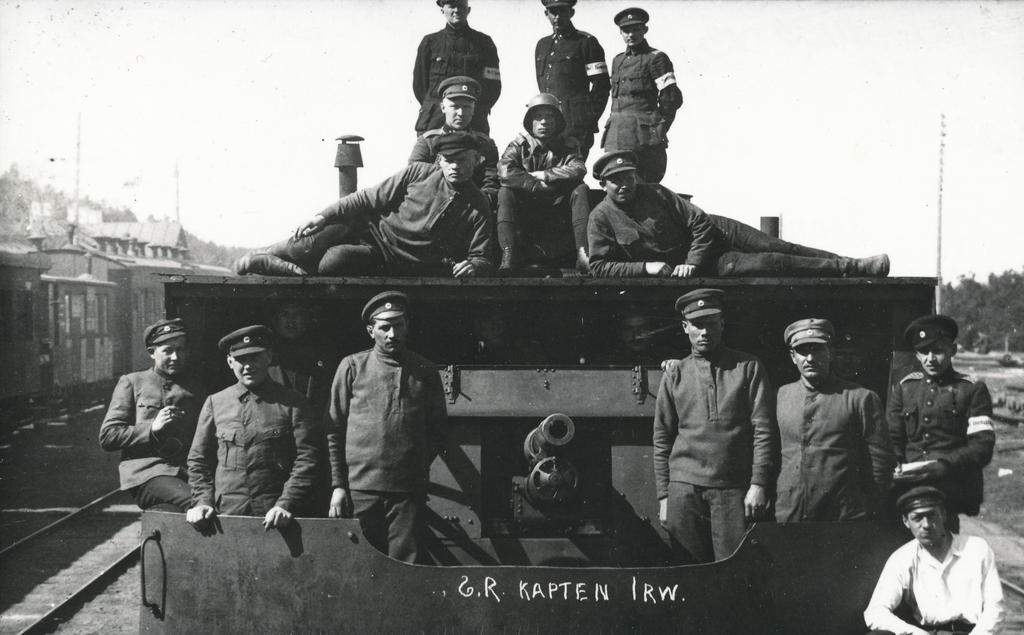
Artillery platform of the armored train "Kapten Irv" in 1919

There were 3 armored trains in the regiment:

- Broad-gauge armored train nr. 1 (Named 'Kapten Irv' after Anton Irv after his death in 1919).
- Broad-gauge armored train nr. 2
- Broad-gauge armored train nr. 3
