= Combat Service Support Battalion, 1st Infantry Brigade =

Military unit of the 1st Infantry Brigade of the Estonian Land Forces

Combat Service Support Battalion
- Lahinguteeninduspataljon
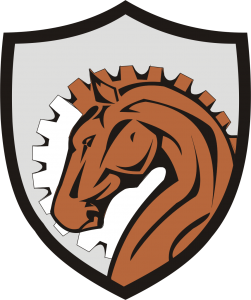
- Combat Service Support Battalion
- Active: 1917–1940; 2009–present
- Country: Estonia
- Branch: Estonian Land Forces
- Type: Combat service support
- Size: Battalion
- Part of: 1st Infantry Brigade
- Garrison/HQ: Tapa Army Base

Commanders
- Current commander: Lieutenant Colonel Riho Juurik

Insignia
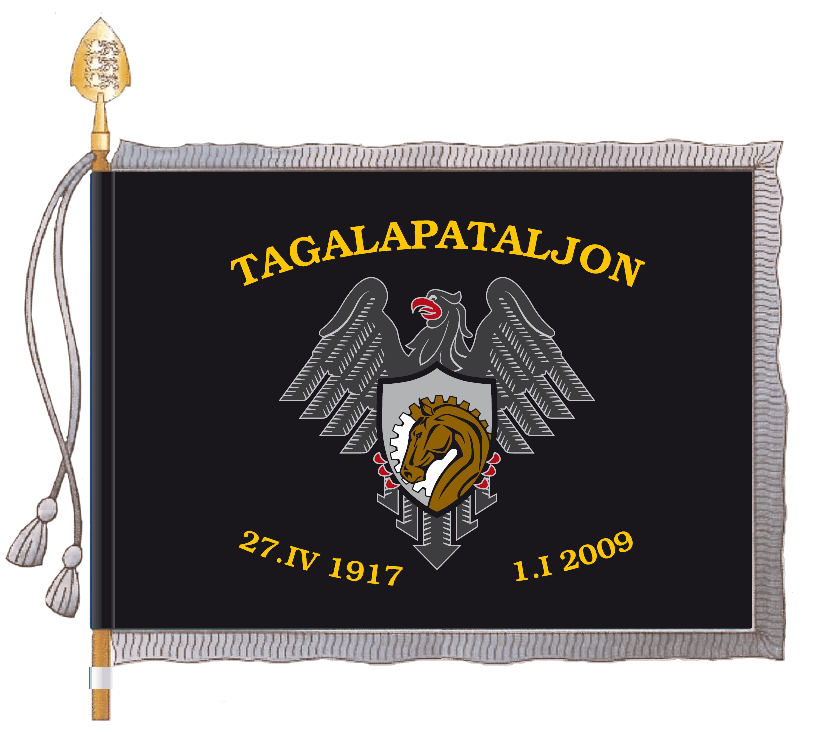
- Flag

The Combat Service Support Battalion (Estonian: Lahinguteeninduspataljon) is a military unit of the 1st Infantry Brigade of the Estonian Land Forces. The battalion has a logistical military role and is located In Tapa, Northern Estonia.

== History ==
The Combat Service Support Battalion is a successor to the support unit of the 1st Infantry Regiment, which was formed on 27 April 1917 and disbanded in 1940. The Combat Service Support Battalion was formed on January 1, 2009, and assigned to the 1st Infantry Brigade along with Scouts Battalion and Kalev Infantry Battalion.

== Current structure ==
Structure as of 7 August 2013:

- Headquarters
- Combat Service Support Center
- Training Company (Estonian: õppekompanii)

== List of commanders ==
- Andres Kraav 2009 - 2010
- Tarmo Luhaäär 2010 - 2012
- Kalmer Kruus 2012 - 2016
- Janek Zõbin 2016 - 2019
- Indrek Lilleorg 2019 - 2021
- Vladislav Belov 2021–2024
- Riho Juurik 2024–present

== See also ==
- 1st Infantry Brigade
- CSS Battalion of the 2nd Infantry Brigade
- Logistics Battalion of the Support Command
