= Aleksander Seiman =

Estonian military personnel

Aleksander Seiman (or Seimann; 23 January 1886 Tõstamaa Parish, Pärnu County – 5 April 1941 Tallinn (or near Tallinn)) was an Estonian military personnel.

1904–1907 he studied at Vilnius Military School.

From 17 December 1924 to 10 February 1925 he was the chief of Estonian Defence League. During the Soviet invasion of Estonia, he was arrested, sentenced to death, and shot.

Awards:

- 1931: Order of the Cross of the Eagle, III class.
