= Estonian Division =

Estonian military unit

- Eesti diviis
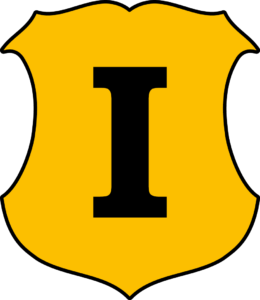
- Active: 2022–present
- Country: Estonia
- Branch: Estonian Land Forces
- Size: Division
- Part of: I. German/Netherlands Corps (NATO)
- Headquarters location: Tallinn
- Website: mil.ee

Commanders
- Current commander: MG Indrek Sirel
- Command Sergeant Major: SM Helari Pilve
- Notable commanders: Veiko-Vello Palm

The Estonian Division is the main combat unit of the Estonian Land Forces. The division was established in December 2022 and commands the 1st and 2nd Infantry Brigades as well as an artillery battalion and support units.

== History ==
An agreement to establish the division was an outcome of the June 2022 Madrid summit. It was formed in December 2022. Major-General Veiko-Vello Palm was appointed to command the division in January 2023.

The Estonian Division is responsible for the defence of the entire country. It can also be assigned to NATO, and forms part of NATO's I. German/Netherlands Corps.

Major-General Palm retired in March 2024. Major-General Indrek Sirel became the new commander of the Estonian Division on 1 August 2024.

== Organization ==
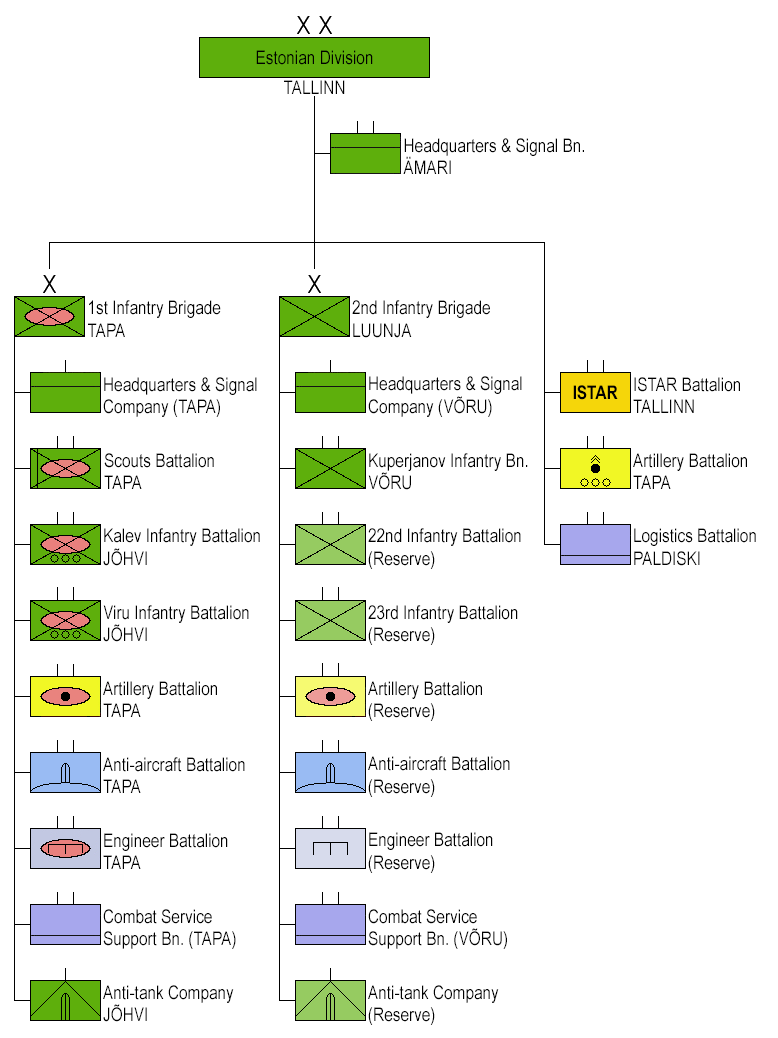
Estonian Division organization as of April 2026

As of April 2026, the Estonian Division comprised:

- Estonian Division, in Tallinn
  - Headquarters and Signal Battalion, Ämari
  - Artillery Regiment, in Tapa
  - ISTAR Battalion, in Tallinn
  - Logistics Battalion, in Paldiski
  - Engineer Battalion, in Tapa
  - 1st Infantry Brigade, in Jõhvi
    - Headquarters and Signal Company, in Jõhvi
    - Scouts Battalion, in Tapa, professional rapid reaction unit armed with CV-90s
    - Kalev Infantry Battalion, in Jõhvi
    - Viru Infantry Battalion, in Jõhvi
    - Air Defense Battalion, in Tapa
    - Combat Service Support Battalion, in Tapa
    - Anti-Tank Company, in Jõhvi
  - 2nd Infantry Brigade, in Tartu
    - Headquarters and Signal Company, in Võru
    - Kuperjanov Infantry Battalion, in Võru
    - 22nd Infantry Battalion (Reserve)
    - 23rd Infantry Battalion (Reserve)
    - Air Defense Battalion (Reserve)
    - Combat Service Support Battalion, in Võru
    - Anti-Tank Company (Reserve)

British Army forces stationed in Estonia support the Estonian Division. A British brigade is held at high readiness to deploy to Estonia. During deployments the brigade would form part of the Estonian Division.

== List of commanders ==
- Major General Veiko-Vello Palm 2023–2024
- Major General Indrek Sirel 2024–present
