= Military history of Estonia =

Two years after the end of the Estonian War of Independence (1918–1920), the Estonian Army consisted of 3 field divisions and a number of small independent battalions and companies (1922).

The Republic of Estonia consisted of 47,750 km^{2} of territory, with a population of 1,107,000 inhabitants. The armed forces was made up of 18,000 men. In the opinion of the Lithuanian Armed Forces General Staff, the army was large enough to defend the Republic of Estonia. Estonia's geographical position was well-suited for military purposes - two large lakes were useful natural obstacles. Conscripts served for 18 months in the infantry, 24 months in other roles in the army, and 36 months in the navy. The Estonian military also had 105,000 reserve force personnel which would have been mobilized in the event of war.

== Infantry ==
- 1st Division
  - Regiment (2 battalions)
  - Regiment (2 battalions)
- 2nd Division
  - Regiment (2 battalions)
  - Regiment (2 battalions)
  - Detached battalion
- 3rd Division
  - Regiment (2 battalions)
  - Detached battalion

== Infantry Organization ==
The army had 12 line battalions. Every battalion consisted of:

- 3 line (infantry) companies of 3 platoons of 2 squads
- Machine gun company
- Technical company
- Cavalry platoon for recognition

The infantry used Russian- and English-made rifles. The accoutrements and ammunition of their weapons were American-made. Two battalions make a regiment in peacetime. After the mobilization, every battalion become regiment.

Comparison of companies

Formation	Number of Machine Guns	Organization
Line coy	6 machine guns (light)	3 platoons of 2 squads
Machine gun coy	12 Maxim machine guns	

== Artillery ==
There were 3 regiments of light artillery, one for each infantry division. In addition, there were 2 groups of heavy artillery in separate units. Artillery regiments were composed of 4 batteries. Single battery consisted of 4 guns. Most were 3 inch Russian guns. There were also English, French and German guns.

== Cavalry ==
Ratsarügement
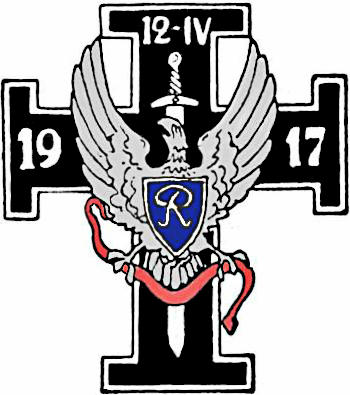
- Active: 1917-1940
- Country: Estonia
- Type: Cavalry
- Size: 2 regiments
- Part of: Estonian Ground Force
- Garrison/HQ: Tartu
- Anniversaries: 11 December
- Engagements: Estonian War of Independence

Commanders
- Notable commanders: Major General Gustav Jonson

- Hussars regiment:
  - 2 line squadrons
  - Mg's squadrons

The Estonian military included two regular Hussar cavalry regiments, as well as six cavalry squadrons that could be called up as part of the reserve army.

Two Estonian cavalry regiments participated in the Estonian War of Independence, along with smaller cavalry formations; every infantry regiment had one reconnaissance cavalry attachment. By the end of the war, another cavalry regiment, the Cavalry Reserve Regiment, was formed in Tallinn, and functioned as a cavalry school for soldiers and officers. The Estonian 2nd Cavalry Regiment was dissolved in 1920.

Despite several attempts by the Estonian Defence Forces to modernize its cavalry, the units could not keep up with the technological advances of the 1930s and the rapid development of armoured warfare. While already declining before World War II, the remaining Estonian cavalry regiments were abolished and attached to the Soviet 22nd Rifle Corps on 10 September 1940.

There have been no cavalry units in the modern Estonian Ground Forces since Estonian independence in 1991.

== Technical Formations ==
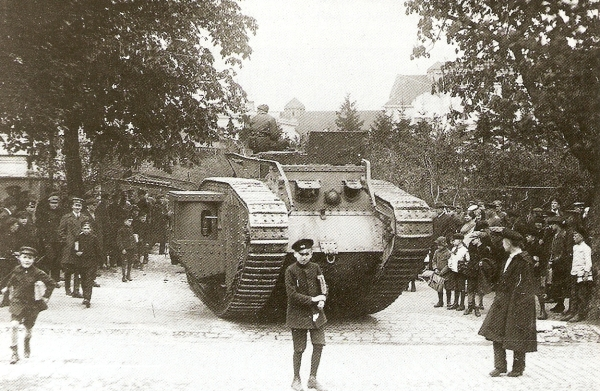
Estonian Mark V driving along Tallinn.

- Armoured brigade
  - 3 armoured trains (with light artillery guns and machine guns)
  - 1 armoured train (narrow gauge)
  - Column of Armoured cars (16)
  - Tanks company (4 heavy, 10 light tanks and 6 tankettes) – Mark V, Renault FT and TKS tankettes.

Armoured trains had an important role in the Estonian War of Independence as well as supporting Latvia in the Latvian War of Independence against Bermontians.

- Technical battalion
  - Railway company
  - Engineering company
  - Signal company
  - Training company

== Aviation ==
3 squadrons – 34 planes and hydroplanes

== The Navy ==
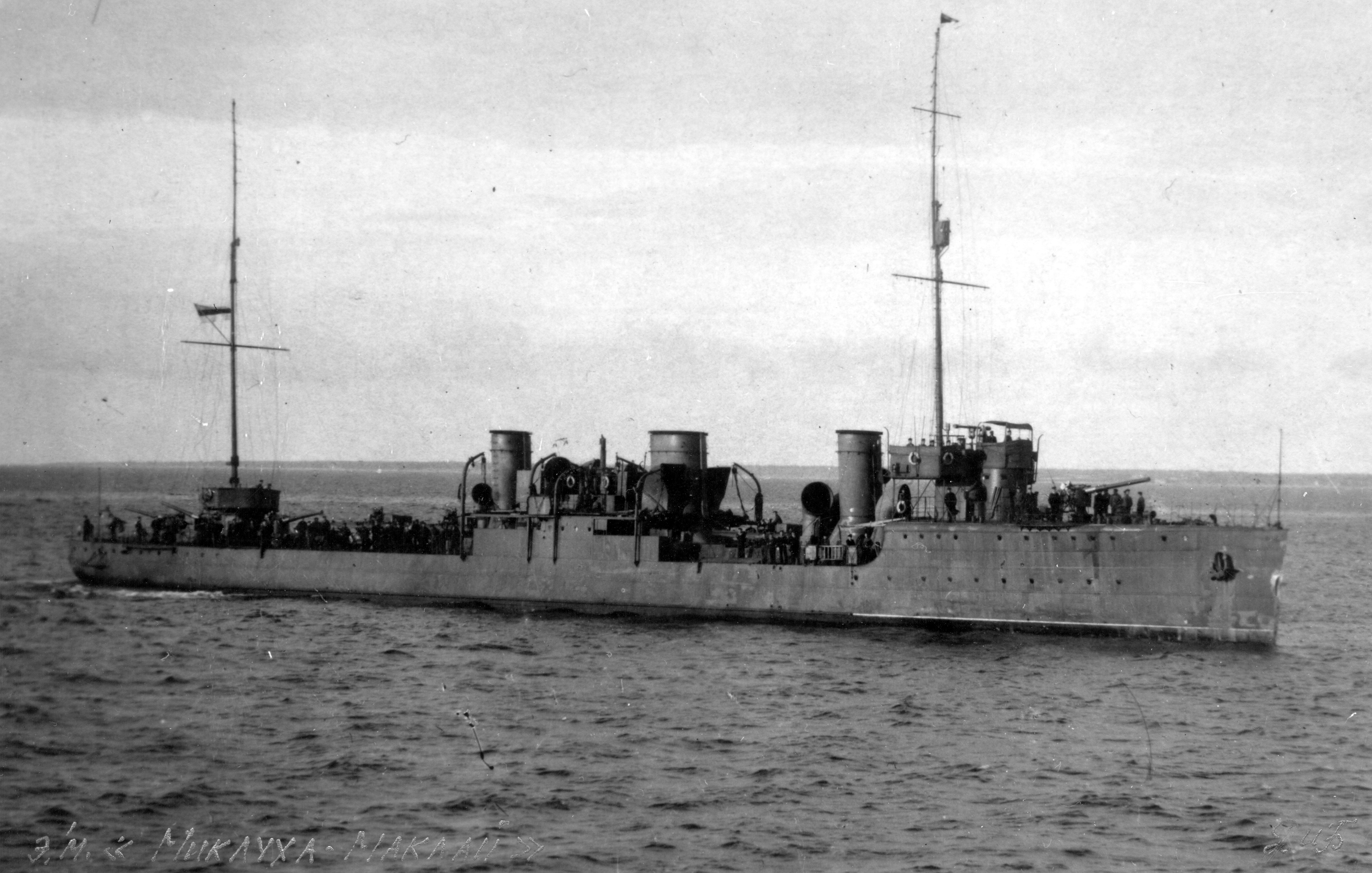
Kapitan Kinsbergen (ship, 1917)

- EML Lembit (former Bobr; Bieber) (gun boat; scrapped 1927)
- EML Lennuk (former Avtroil) (destroyer; sold to Peru in 1933; later Almirante Guise)
- EML Wambola (former Kapitan 2. ranga Kingsbergen; Kapitan 1. ranga Miklukho-Maklay; Spartak) (destroyer; sold to Peru in 1933; later Almirante Villar)
- EML Ristna (minesweeper)
- EML Suurop (minesweeper)
- EML Sulev (torpedo gunboat)
- EML Kalev (submarine)
- EML Lembit (submarine)

== Training ==
- Central school of NCOs.
- Military technical school - Cadets (2 years) and officers (short courses).
- Military school – Preparing candidates for officer corps to The Army (3 years course). Here studying young men receive the lieutenant rank after graduation.
- General staff courses (from 1921) in Tallinn - One year-long course for senior officers to prepare for work in The General Staff. It had 15 students in 1921.

== See also ==
- Estonian Military units
- Estonian Minister of Defence
- Finnish–Estonian defense cooperation
- Suurtükiväegrupp
