= 3rd Division (Estonia) =

Estonian military unit

3. Diviis; 3rd Division
- Active: 1919-1940
- Country: Estonia
- Branch: Estonian Army
- Type: Infantry
- Garrison/HQ: Tallinn, Estonia
- Engagements: Estonian War of Independence

Commanders
- First commander: Major-General Ernst Põdder
- Last commander: Major-General Herbert Brede

The 3rd Division of the Estonian Army, was one of the three Estonian divisions created during the Estonian War of Independence, which was active till the Soviet occupation of Estonia.

The division's first commander was Ernst Põdder.

== History ==
The 3rd Division staff was based in Tallinn. Since February 1, 1940, the division was made up by the Harju Military District and Lääne-Saare Military District.

=== Order of battle ===
The unit order of battle in 1939:

- Automobile-Tank Regiment
- 6th Single Infantry Battalion
- 9th Single Infantry Battalion
- 10th Single Infantry Battalion
- Sakala Partisan Battalion
- Kalev Single Infantry Battalion
- Scouts Single Infantry Battalion
- Engineering Battalion
- Signal Battalion
- 5th Artillery Group

== See also ==
- 1st Division
- 2nd Division
- 4th Division
- 1st Infantry Brigade
