= Engineer Battalion (Estonia) =

Estonian specialized unit

- Pioneeripataljon
- Insignia of Engineer Battalion
- Active: 15 December 1917 – 18 December 1940; 2 January 2002 – present
- Country: Estonia
- Branch: Estonian Land Forces
- Type: Pioneer
- Role: Combat engineering
- Size: Battalion
- Part of: 1st Infantry Brigade
- Garrison/HQ: Tapa Army Base
- Nickname: "Lahingpioneerid"
- Anniversaries: 15 December - formed 2 January - restored
- Engagements: Estonian War of Independence; Afghanistan War (2001); Iraq War (2003)

Commanders
- Current commander: Major Taavi Moor
- Notable commanders: Captain Voldemar Riiberg

Insignia
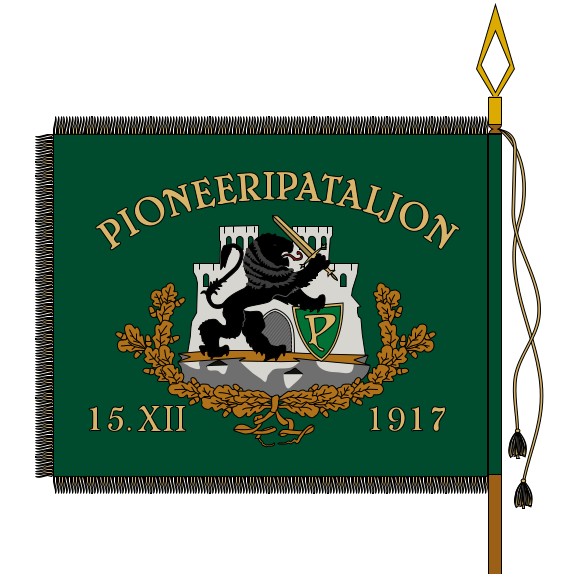
- Flag

The Engineer Battalion (Estonian: Pioneeripataljon) is a combat engineering battalion of the Estonian Defence Forces, based out of Tapa Army Base. The unit falls under the command of 1st Infantry Brigade of Estonian Land Forces.

The Engineer Battalion plays a supportive role on the battlefield performing such tasks as fortification, bridge and road construction or destruction, laying or clearing landmines, neutralization of improvised explosive devices (IEDs) and general engineering tasks under fire. More generally speaking, the combat engineer's tasks involve facilitating movement and support of friendly forces while impeding that of the enemy. The unit is also equipped and trained to deal with the NBC weapons threat and disarmament.

== History ==
=== Formation and the Inseneripataljon (1917 - 1924) ===
The creation date of the Engineer Battalion is considered to be 15 December 1917, when an engineer company was formed under the 1st Estonian Infantry Division of the Imperial Russian Army, according to a decree by Jaan Soots. The company was headed by lieutenant Artur Normak. Equipment was transferred from the Single Engineer Company of the 118th Russian Infantry Division. The company consisted of a staff and a clerical office, two telegraph platoons, two sapper platoons and a park platoon. By 1918, the company had 25-30 officers and up to 400 soldiers. Because of German occupation, the unit was disbanded on April 5, 1918, with the liquidation committee working until May 15.

On 19 November 1918, the Engineer Battalion (Estonian: Inseneripataljon) was formed under the Estonian People's Army with 1st and later 2nd Sapper Company, a railroad company, telegraph company, vehicle company, searchlight unit, pontoon unit and a flight squadron. The task of forming the unit was given to captain Nikolai Peterson. On 21 November 1918, captain Voldemar Rieberg was appointed the units commander, and on November 25 he took over the position. Soon after, the 1st Sapper Company took part in battles on the Viru front (Rägavere and Kehra battles) as part of the 1st Division in the Estonian War of Independence. The 2nd Sapper Company acted as part of the 2nd Division on the southern front, mainly securing the southern border, which was established with Tartu Peace Treaty. The battalions railroad company formed three repair trains, which were used to repair bridges and support armored trains. One of the trains was also later used on the southern front, on the Valga-Marienburg line, to repair over 50 bridges. The telegraph company was formed into four cable squads, three of which were sent to the front to repair and rebuild lines on recaptured territories. The fourth squad stayed to finish the local communications network. The company was formed into a separate Communications Battalion on March 15, 1924. On 22 February 1919, a decree was released by the Staff of the Ministry of War, according to which the flight squadron was formed into the Estonian Air Force. The unit finally separated from the battalion on March 1, 1919. The vehicle company was mainly tasked with organizing transportation. On 22 May 1919, it was made into a separate unit, no longer under the Engineer Battalion. After the Estonian War of Independence, in 1920, the People's Army was demobilized. The battalion had lost 2 officers and 13 enlisted in the war. The sapper companies were again subordinated to the Engineer Battalion and moved to Nõmme. Between 31 August 1920 and 11 September 1922, the battalion was headed by captain G. Meister, then temporarily by major Gustav Vladimir Kirschbaum until January 17, 1923, when the position was taken over by Johann Bernhard Grünberg.

=== Reformation and disbandement (1924 - 1940) ===
On 15 March 1924, two new military units were formed, based on the Engineer Battalion: the Pioneer Battalion (Estonian: Pioneeripataljon) and Communication Battalion (Estonian: Sidepataljon). The new units were subordinated to the Engineer Force Inspectorate (Estonian: Inseneriväe inspektuur) of the General Staff, headed by Rieberg. The battalion was commanded by lieutenant colonel Johann Bernhard Grünberg. The main tasks of the unit were to conduct the specialized training of conscripts, preparation of personnel of the engineer force and providing peacetime engineer support for the Estonian military.

The peacetime structure of the Pioneer Battalion consisted of pioneer-, chemical defence-, railroad pioneer- and searchlight subunits. There were also units for training and providing engineer support during peace. In 1934, the Railroad Pioneer Company was reformed to 3rd Pioneer Company. After a restructuring of the army, the 1st Pioneer Company was subordinated to the 1st Division in Narva, the 2nd Pioneer Company was subordinated to the 2nd Division in Võru and the 3rd Pioneer Company stayed in Nõmme, under the 3rd Division. In 1939, the searchlight unit was reformed into the Park Company, which was responsible for all of the equipment of the Pioneer Battalion. The wartime structure envisioned the formation of a pioneer battalion in every division, supported by a work squad, engineer depot and road squads. The formation of road squads was later dropped.

Most of the personnel of the Pioneer Battalion consisted of conscripts. Technical education was a prerequisite for serving in the unit. Since 1928, the service time in the battalion was 18 months, though between 1933 and 1937 it was dropped to 12 months. It was later raised back to 18 months. The conscripts first went through basic soldier training, which was followed by specialized pioneer training. The most promising students were sent to the Pioneer Battalion's training company, where they received NCO training. The best students from that course were sent to the Estonian National Defence College, after which they could continue service in the Pioneer Battalion. Due to financial constraints, reserve training was only conducted for officers and NCO's.

By the end of 1930's the Pioneer Battalion was generally considered to be decently equipped, though mobilization reserves were inadequate. Since 1937, the Estonian Defence Forces were going through a mechanization project, which brought new equipment to the battalion. By 1940, the battalion was equipped with: nine trucks, one car, three flamethrowers, three tractors, one excavator, one tracked transporter and other equipment, such as compressors, generators, outboard motors, concrete mixers, boring machines, rams, chainsaws etc. However, most of the personnel still had to move on foot. Furthermore, due to limited motorization and wide dispersion of equipment depots, the formation of the units during mobilization would have been cumbersome and slow.

In 1940, after the Soviets occupied Estonia, the Pioneer Battalion was gradually disbanded and a separate sapper battalion was formed under the 22nd Rifle Corps instead of it. The unit was disbanded by a liquidation committee between October 1 until December 18, 1940.

=== Restoration and present day (2002 - present) ===
The current incarnation of the Engineer Battalion was initially formed on January 2, 2002, under the Artillery Battalion as an engineer school. On February 1, 2003, the engineer school was reformed into the Engineer Battalion, under the Tapa Training Center. In 2003, an EOD team was sent to Afghanistan for ordnance disposal and demining tasks as part of ISAF. Later the EOD team would take part in Resolute Support Mission and UNIFIL. As of 2004, the battalion was headed by captain Allan Parv. The unit received its flag on May 31, 2005. On August 8, 2007, captain Antti Viljaste became the units commander, replacing captain Margus Neudorf. On July 1, 2008, the battalion was subordinated to the North-Eastern Regional Defence Command. On December 12, 2013, major Vesse Põder replaced major Marek Värk as the units commander. On August 1, 2014, the battalion was made part of the 1st Infantry Brigade. On December 15, 2015, lieutenant colonel Eero Tepp became the units commander, but was replaced by major Priit Heinloo on November 1, 2016, due to a drunk driving incident. On 6 July 2018, major Ainar Afanasjev became the commander of the battalion.

Until 2014 the battalion consisted of a headquarters company, two training companies, explosive ordnance disposal center and an engineer school. The headquarters was tasked with counseling the commander of the battalion, coordinating the units intelligence related activities, organizing training activities, evaluating the training and capabilities of the subunits, planning and organizing mobilization and wartime activities, planning the necessary support for everyday activities, drafting of battalion's budget plan and performing assignments set by superior commanders. The unit consisted of a headquarters platton, combat service support platoon, medical platoon and an engineer reconnaissance platoon. The training companies were tasked with planning, preparing and executing the training of conscripts and organizing training exercises together with other units. Each training company consisted of 2-3 engineer platoons and one technical platoon. The Defence Forces Explosive Ordnance Disposal Center is tasked with finding and destroying explosive ordnance on Defence Forces territories and exercise areas, organizing ordnance disposal training and conducting research in the related field. The Defence Forces Explosive Ordnance Disposal Center (Estonian: Kaitseväe Demineerimiskeskus) was formed under the Engineer Battalion in 2005 and consists of three Improvised Explosive Devices Disposal (IEDD) Teams and one Underwater Conventional Munition Disposal (UWCMD) Team. The IEDD team is tasked with defusing improvised explosive devices, but they can also defuse industrially manufactured munitions. The UWCMD team is tasked with defusing munitions on the ground and underwater and are also capable of performing the tasks of an IEDD team. Because of strict requirements for qualification, the EOD center is staffed with only professional soldiers. The engineer school was tasked with planning and executing engineering courses, participating in engineering science and research activities and organizing training exercises with other subunits. As of 2017, there were over 400 conscripts serving in the battalion.

Based on the needs of the Estonian Defence Forces, one of the important tasks has been the development of bridging capabilities. To support this development, the battalion received four new TMM-3M vehicle-launched bridges mounted on KrAZ trucks in 2015. In addition to this, a number of different armored engineering vehicles based on the Leopard 1 platform were ordered from Netherlands in 2014. Since 2015, the battalions technical platoons also operate two specially modified Mercedes-Benz Unimog U5000 trucks. The trucks are equipped with a winch, four support legs, a 1.5 tonne crane, which can be equipped with a water pump, and a multitude of different tools for engineering tasks.
