= Artur Tiganik =

Estonian Brigadier General (born 1971)

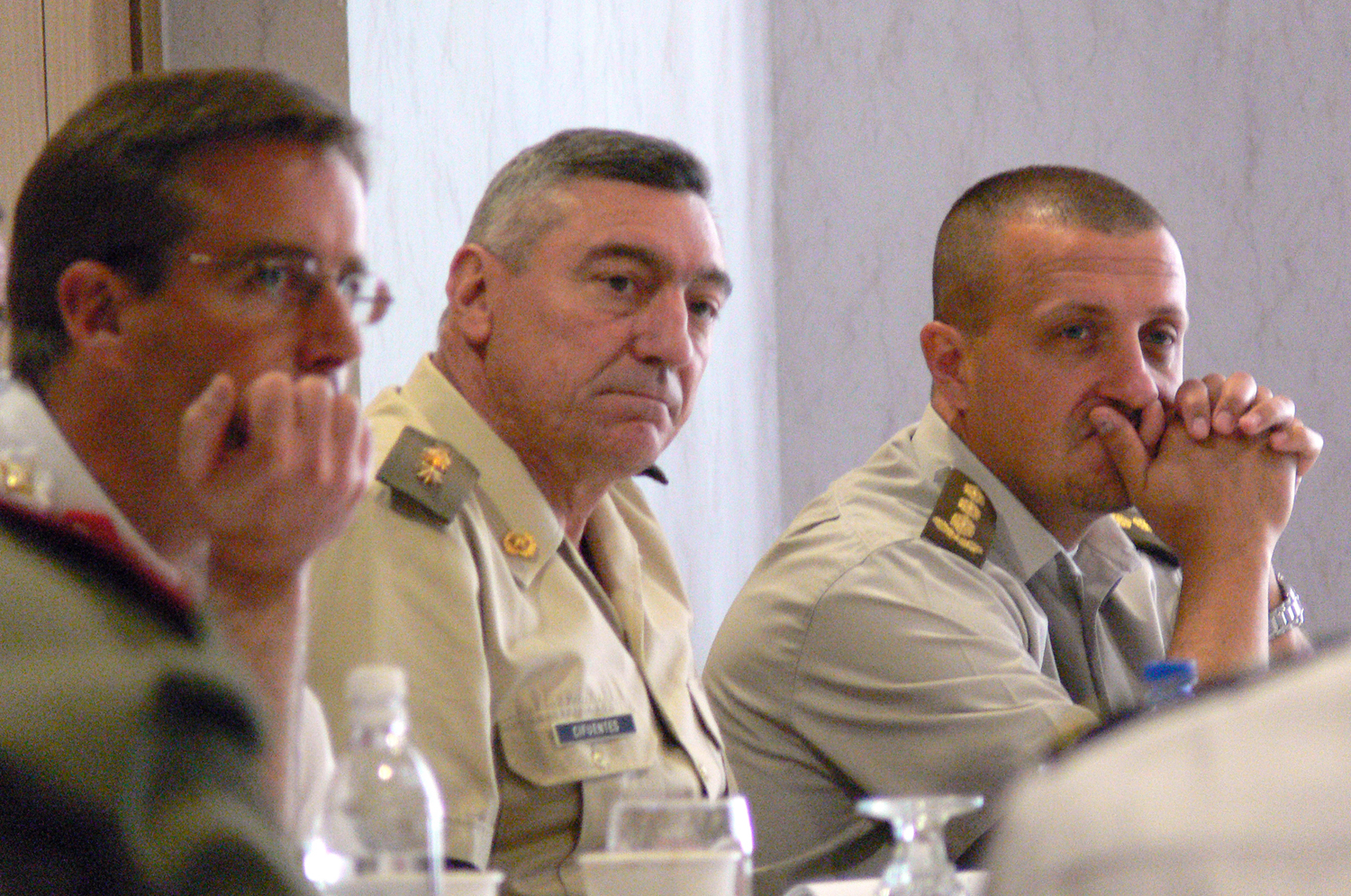
- Tiganik (right) at the U.S. Army Europe Combined Forces Land Component Command seminar
- Born: 13 January 1971 (age 55); Loksa, Estonia
- Allegiance: Estonia
- Branch: Estonian Land Forces
- Service years: 1992–2022
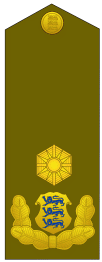
- Rank: Brigadier General
- Commands: Deputy Commander of the Estonian Defence Forces; Estonian Land Forces; 1st Infantry Brigade; Scouts Battalion; Kalev Infantry Battalion
- Awards: 4th Class of the Order of the Cross of the Eagle

Artur Tiganik (born 13 January 1971) is an Estonian Brigadier General who served as the Deputy Commander of the Estonian Defence Forces. He previously served as the Commander of the Estonian Land Forces.

== Biography ==
Tiganik was born in Loksa, Estonia. After graduating from the Basic Officers' course in Ryazan Higher Airborne Command School, he returned to Estonia and commanded units from platoon level up to battalion of the Kalev Infantry Battalion since 1992 to 2000. After graduating from Baltic Defence College, he continued his career as Commander of the Scouts Battalion from 2001 to 2004. In 2005, he was appointed to the ISAF mission in Afghanistan as a CJ3 Staff Officer. Between 2005 and 2006, Tiganik was Chief of the Training Department in the Estonian National Defence College. From 2006 to 2009 he served as Brigade Commander of the 1st Infantry Brigade.

From 2009 to 2012, Tiganik served as the Chief of Staff of the Estonian Land Forces and in 2012 he was promoted to the position of Commander. On 1 August 2014, Artur Tiganik was appointed Deputy Chief of the Estonian Defence Forces.

== Awards and decorations ==
Estonian awards and decorations
Order of the Cross of the Eagle with swords, 4th Class
Distinguished Service Decoration of the Estonian Defence Forces
Meritorious Service Cross of the Estonian Defence Forces
10 Years of the Re-Established Estonian Defence Forces Medal
Distinguished Service Decoration of the Estonian Defence League
NATO Medal
Ministry of Defence Medal of Participants in International Military Operations

== Effective dates of promotion ==
Promotions
Insignia	Rank	Date
	Second Lieutenant	1992
	Lieutenant	21 June 1993
	Captain	19 February 1996
	Major	18 June 1999
	Lieutenant Colonel	12 June 2003
	Colonel	16 June 2008
	Brigadier General	5 February 2015

== Personal life ==
In addition to Estonian, Tiganik is fluent in English and Russian. He is married and has one daughter.

Military offices
Preceded by Indrek Sirel	Commander of the Estonian Land Forces; 2012–2014	Succeeded by Position abolished
Preceded by Position established	Deputy Commander of the Estonian Defence Forces; 2014–2016	Succeeded by Indrek Sirel
