= Lumiste =

Lumiste is an Estonian surname. Notable people with the surname include:

- Raivo Lumiste (born 1969), Estonian military leader
- Ülo Lumiste (1929–2017), Estonian mathematician
