= Tapa Airfield =

Airfield in Estonia

Tapa Airfield Tapa lennuväli
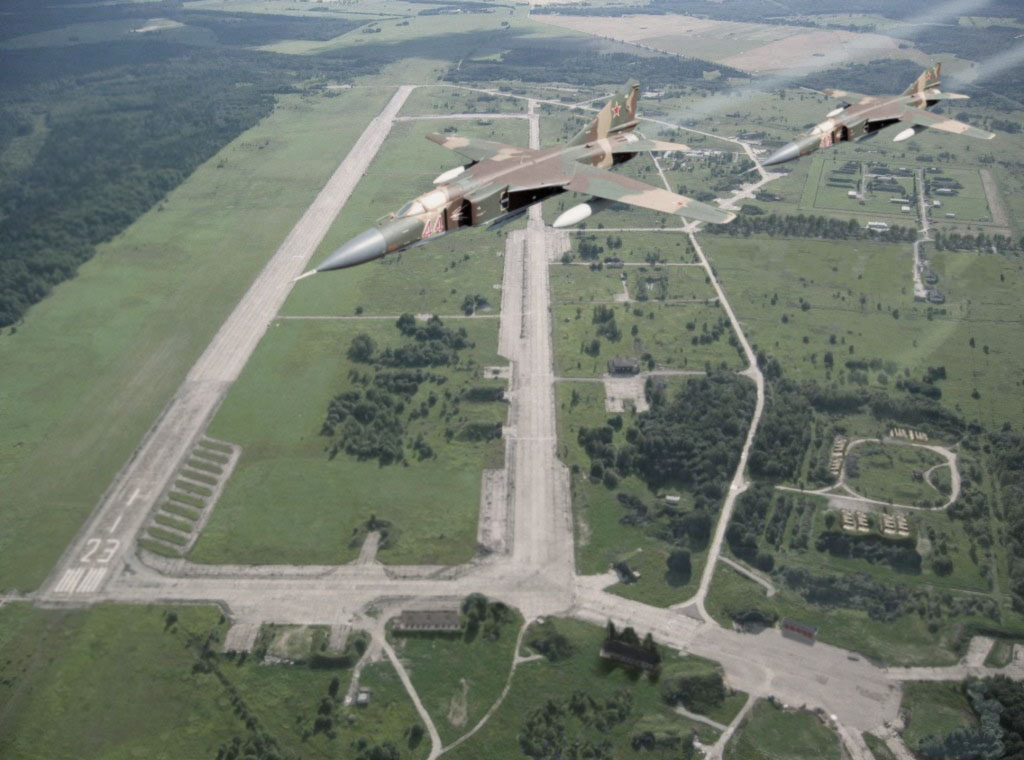
- IATA: none; ICAO: EETA

Summary
- Airport type: Military
- Operator: Estonian Air Force
- Location: Tapa
- Elevation AMSL: 331 ft / 101 m
- Coordinates: 59°14′06″N 025°57′06″E

Map
- Location in Estonia

Runways
Direction	Length		Surface
Direction	m	ft	Surface
05/23	2,500	8,202	Concrete
- Sources: Forgotten Airfields

Tapa Airfield (ICAO: EETA) is an unused air base in Estonia located 3 km (1.9 mi) southwest of Tapa. During the Cold War it was home to the 656th Fighter Aviation Regiment PVO (IAP PVO). For most of the time the regiment was part of the 14th Air Defence Division of the 6th Air Defence Army.

Tapa's interceptor regiment initially operated the Mikoyan-Gurevich MiG-17 (ASCC: Fresco) then the Sukhoi Su-9 (ASCC: Fishpot) in the 1960s and 1970s. This aircraft was replaced in 1978 with the Mikoyan-Gurevich MiG-23M (ASCC: Flogger-B).

In 1987, interceptor aircraft were dispatched from Tapa to intercept Mathias Rust's Cessna 172 in a famous Cold War incident. To prevent a recurrence, the 384th Independent Helicopter Squadron (384 OVE) was deployed here with the Mil Mi-24P (ASCC: Hind-F) between 1989 and 1992.

== See also ==
- Tapa Army Base
- List of airports in Estonia
