= 2nd Division (Estonia) =

Estonian military unit

2. Diviis; 2nd Division
- Active: 1918-1940
- Country: Estonia
- Branch: Estonian Army
- Type: Infantry
- Garrison/HQ: Tartu, Estonia
- Engagements: Estonian War of Independence

Commanders
- First commander: Colonel Viktor Puskar

The 2nd Division, was one of the three Estonian divisions created during the Estonian War of Independence, which was active until the Soviet occupation of Estonia.

== History ==
The 2nd Division staff was based in Tartu. Since February 1, 1940, the division was made up by the Tartu Military District and Võru-Petseri Military District.

=== Order of battle ===
The unit order of battle in 1939:

- 7th Infantry Regiment
- 2nd Single Infantry Battalion
- 3rd Single Infantry Battalion
- 8th Single Infantry Battalion
- Kuperjanov Partisan Battalion
- Cavalry Regiment
- 3rd Artillery Group
- 4th Artillery Group

== See also ==
- 1st Division
- 3rd Division
- 4th Division
- 1st Infantry Brigade
