= Vahur Karus =

Estonian military personnel

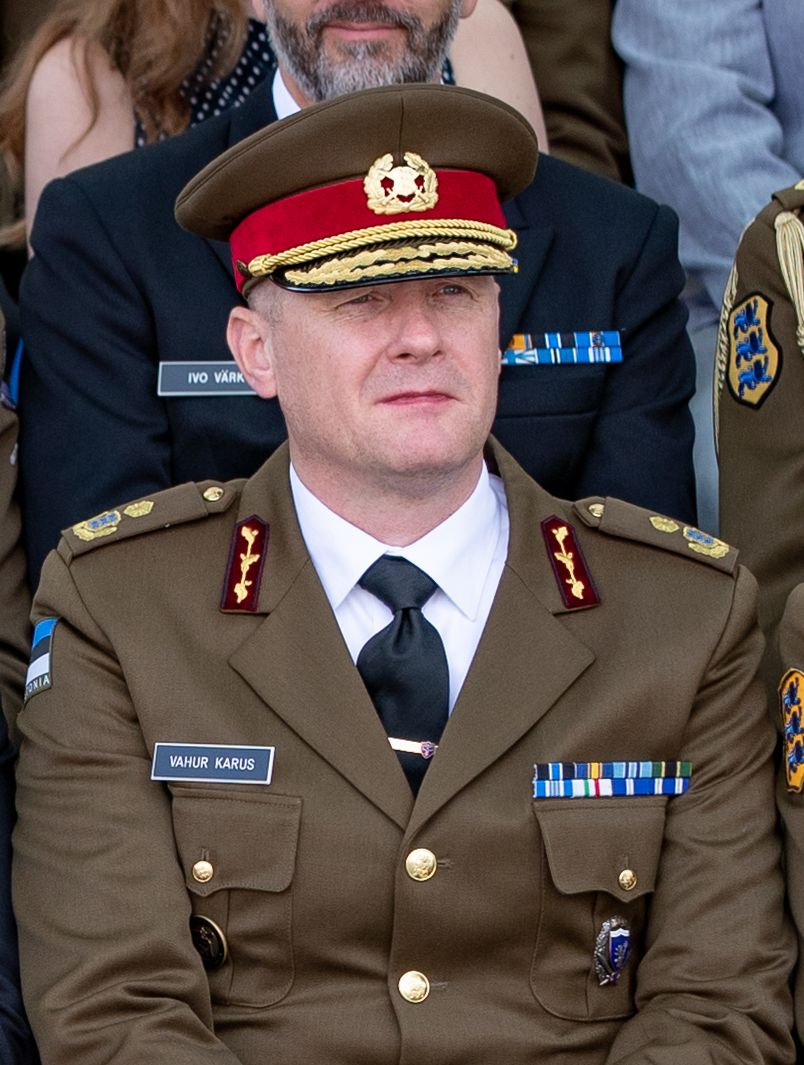
- Born: 17 November 1974 (age 51); Pärnu, then part of Estonian SSR, Soviet Union
- Allegiance: Estonia
- Branch: Estonian Defence Forces
- Service years: 1993 – present
- Rank: Major General

Vahur Karus (born 17 November 1974) is an Estonian general.

== Career ==
Karus was born on 17 November 1974 in Pärnu. Since 1993 he has worked for Estonian Defence Forces. From 2006 to 2007 he was the commander of the Estonian Contingency in Afghanistan. He has been the commander of the Scouts Battalion. Since 2018 he was the commander of 1st Infantry Brigade. Later he became the Commander of the Estonian Military Academy and since 2024 he is Chief of Staff at the Headquarters of the Estonian Defence Forces.
