= Artillery Regiment, Estonian Division =

Estonian military unit

- Estonian: Suurtükiväerügement
- Insignia
- Active: 1918–1940; 1998–present
- Country: Estonia
- Branch: Estonian Land Forces
- Type: Artillery
- Role: Fire support
- Size: Regiment
- Part of: Estonian Division
- Garrison/HQ: Tapa Army Base
- Anniversaries: 16 January – formed 20 March – restored
- Engagements: Estonian War of Independence

Commanders
- Current commander: Colonel Marko Tomentšuk

The Artillery Regiment (Estonian: Suurtükiväerügement) of the Estonian Division, formerly the Artillery Battalion (Estonian: Suurtükiväepataljon) and Artillery Group (Estonian: Suurtükiväegrupp), is an artillery regiment of the Estonian Defence Forces, based out of Tapa Army Base. The unit is part of the Estonian Land Forces. It is tasked with supporting combat units with indirect fire during war-time.

The regiment is split into 2 battalions. 1 Battalion is under the 1st Infantry Brigade, and the other battalion under then 2nd Infantry Brigade. Equipment is split in half between both battalions. ` Peace time structure:

- Fires Battery
- Rocket Artillery Battery
- Loitering Munitions Battery
- Command and Support Battery
- Service and Maintenance Platoon

== Equipment ==
- K9 "Kõu"
- M142 "HIMARS"
- CAESAR Mk.I

== History ==
=== Formation and War of Independence (1917–1920) ===
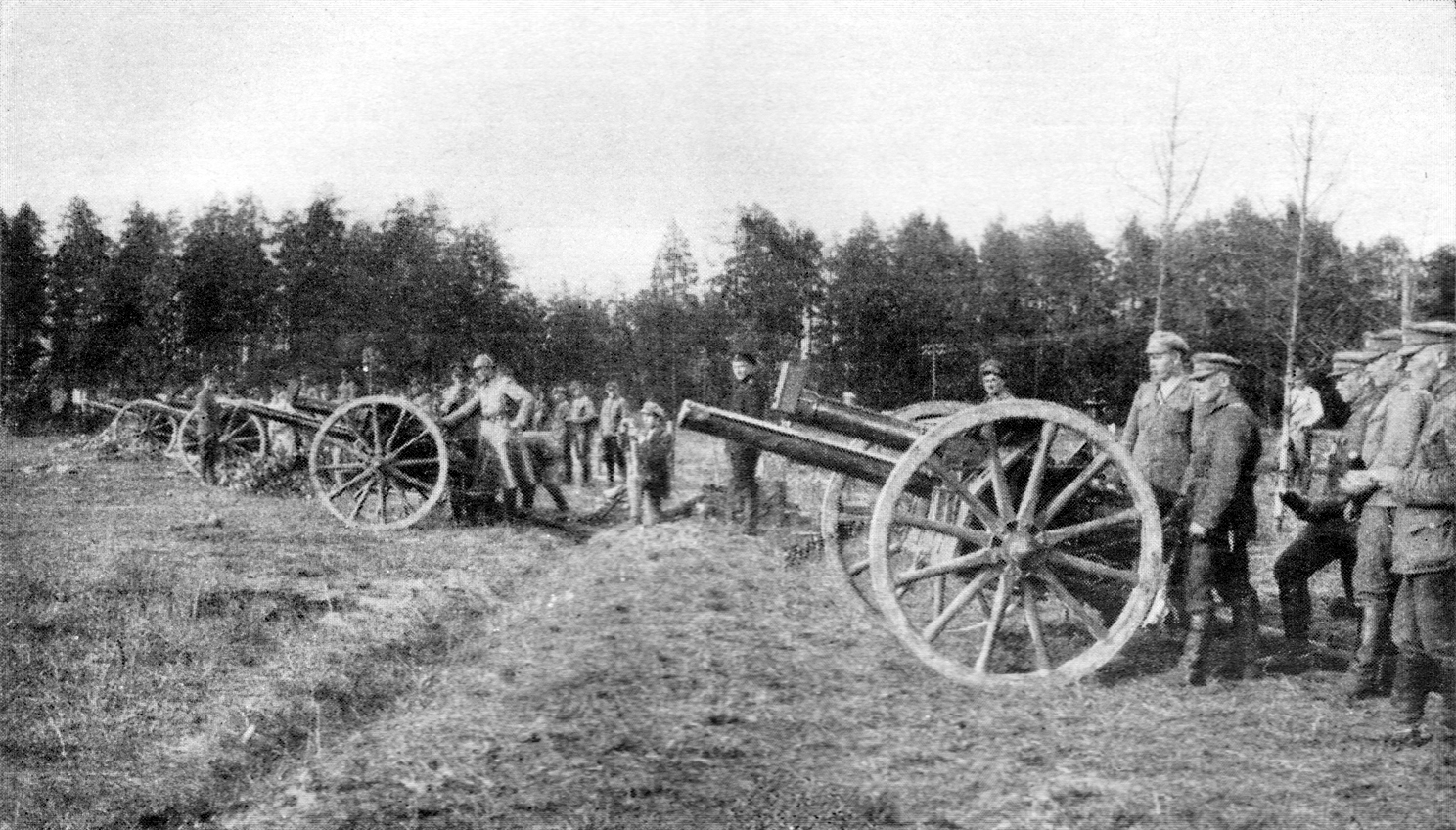
Battery No 1 of the Estonian 1st Artillery Regiment during the fight against Landeswehr.

The formation of an artillery unit began in early 1917, when artillerymen started gathering into a trench artillery unit, which, by December 1917, consisted of a couple hundred men. On 26 December 1917, an artillery commando (Estonian: suurtükiväelaste komando) was formed under the 1st Estonian Infantry Company, according to a decree by the commander of the 1st Division. Junior ensign Joosep Sild became the units commander. The unit was equipped with 24 Russian three-inch model 1902 field guns and ammunition from 44th and 45th Artillery Brigade of the Russian Empire.

The 1st Estonian Artillery Brigade (Estonian: 1. suurtükiväebrigaad) was formed on 16 January 1918 in Haapsalu, with podpolkovnik Andres Larka appointed as its commander. By February, the brigade consisted of five batteries, with 26 artillery pieces, 21 officers and 801 soldiers. However, it was quickly disbanded by bolsheviks on 21 February 1918. After the bolsheviks retreated in front of the Germans, the Estonian division was allowed to form again on 26 February, with captain Karl Tiitso becoming the artillery brigades commander. The brigade was finally demobilized and disarmed by German occupation forces on 5 April.

On 15 November 1918, captain Hugo Kauler started gathering former artillery officers in Tallinn. On 21 November 1918 the Estonian Minister of War Andres Larka appointed him as the commander of the 1st Artillery Regiment (Estonian: 1. suurtükiväepolk) and gave him the task of forming it. Initially, the unit had a hard time finding equipment, and the first battles of the Estonian War of Independence were fought on 28 November 1918 in Narva as infantry. In December 1918, the Estonians managed to buy two 7.7 cm FK 16 field guns from the Germans. Another batch of guns was received from Finland, consisting of twenty 87 mm model 1877 and four 76 mm model 1900 field guns. By 1919, the regiment consisted of three divisions, each containing two batteries. In total, 18 batteries participated in the War of Independence, which saw action on the Viru front, in Viljandi, Valga, Võru, and under Cēsis in Latvia, against the Baltic Landwehr.

=== Republic of Estonia and Soviet occupation (1920–1940) ===
In March 1920, the unit was demobilized and relocated to Narva. It consisted of four batteries, a training commando and the 1st Fortress Artillery Group. The unit was renamed multiple times. On 1 June 1920, it was named the Estonian: 1. välja suurtükiväe divisjon. on 1 January 1921, it was named the Estonian: 1. suurtükiväepolk. On 24 November 1922, it was named the Estonian: 1. suurtükiväerügement. On 15 March 1924, the unit was reformed into the 1st Division Artillery Force (Estonian: 1. diviisi suurtükivägi), which consisted of the 1st Artillery Group (Estonian: 1. dsuurtükiväegrupp), based out of Narva, and 2nd Artillery Group (Estonian: 2. suurtükiväegrupp), based out of Rakvere. Major Georg Leets became the commander of the division and major Erich Toffer became the commander of the 1st Artillery Group. The unit received its flag on 28 October 1928. By 1939, the 1st Artillery Group consisted of a headquarters, a specialist commando, three batteries with four Russian 76 mm model 1902 field guns each, and one battery with two German 150 mm heavy field howitzers. On 19 September 1940, when the Soviets had occupied Estonia, a decree ordering the disbandment of the unit was released. The liquidation of the unit was concluded on 19 December 1940.

=== Restoration and present day (1996 – present) ===
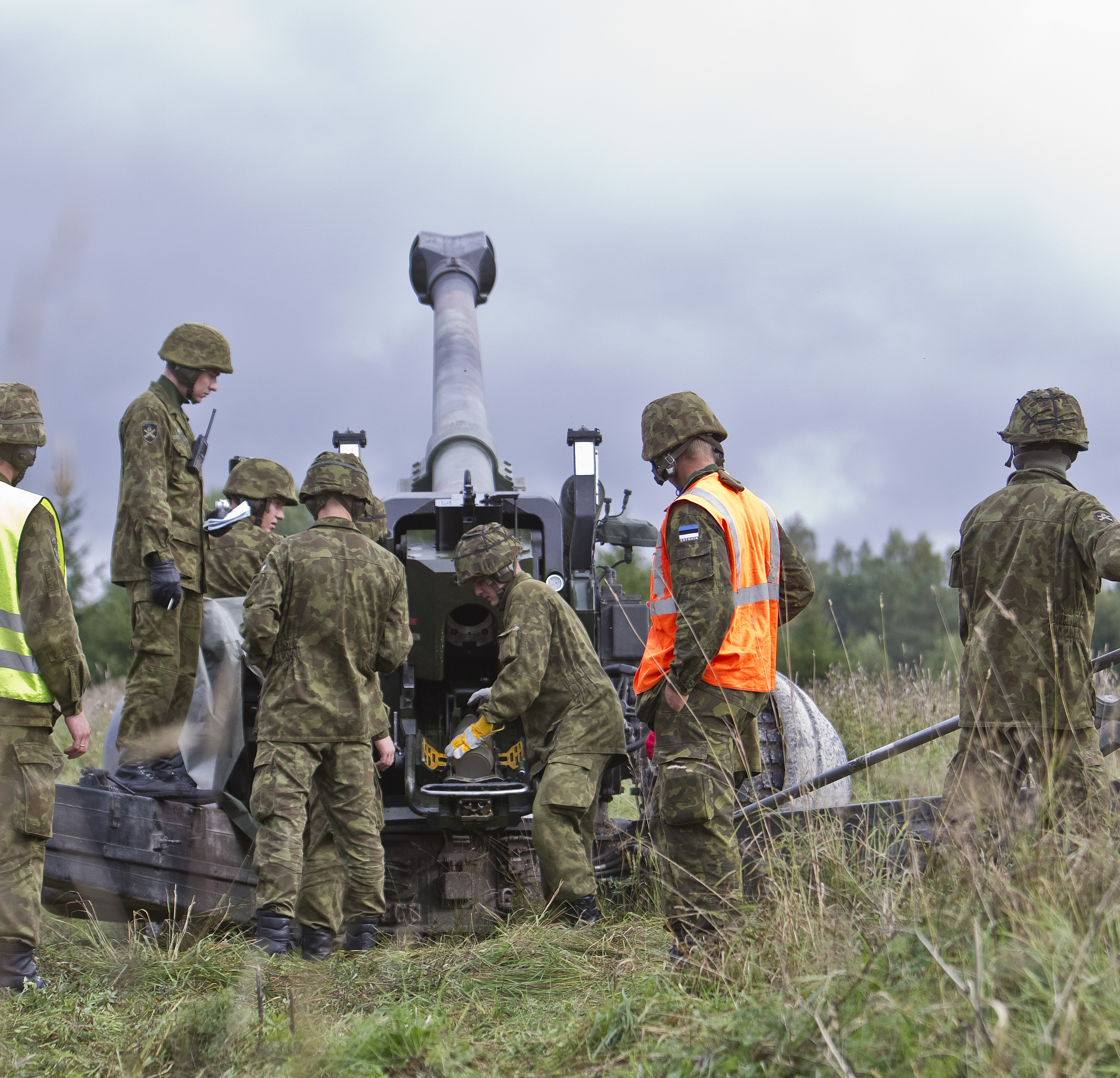
Artillery Battalion reserve soldiers during an exercise in 2011

Efforts to form an artillery battalion in the newly re-established Republic of Estonia started taking shape in 1996, when a working group, called "Viro projekti" (English: Estonian project), was established under the Finnish Defence Command to assist the development of Estonian Defence Forces. Reserve colonel Jouko Kivimäki was chosen to assist the restoration and development of the artillery unit. Formation of the unit was not easy, because there were very few officers available, infrastructure was severely lacking and there was almost no necessary equipment. Due to these limitations, the first soldiers started receiving training in Finland in September 1997. By early 1998, the soldiers had completed their training. Finnish Defence Forces also donated various equipment, including 105 mm H61-37 howitzers, which arrived between December 1997 to February 1998.

The unit was officially restored on 20 March 1998, when the Northern Separate Infantry Battalion was transformed into the Artillery Group. The unit received its flag on 20 March 2001. On 1 February 2003, the unit was subordinated to the Tapa Training Center. Between 2003–2004, the Artillery Group received 155 mm FH-70 howitzers from Germany, and in 2008, it received 122 mm howitzers from Finland, which replaced the old 105 mm howitzers. On 1 July 2008, the unit was transferred under the North-Eastern Regional Defence Command. On 1 January 2009, the Artillery Group was renamed the Artillery Battalion. On 1 August 2014, the battalion was made part of the 1st Infantry Brigade. As of 2014, the Artillery Battalion consisted of a headquarters, headquarters and support battery, artillery school, and a fires battery. As of 2023, the battalion reported directly to the headquarters of the Estonian Division.

The battalion is currently being re-equipped with 18 K9 Thunder self-propelled howitzers with full combat readiness projected to be achieved by 2026.

In the middle of the 2025, an artillery regiment was created to replace the artillery battalion. Creating a regiment strengthens the unit's capabilities and enhances training.

== See also ==
- Estonian Division
- 25th Artillery Battalion
