= Aron Kalmus =

Estonian soldier

Aron Kalmus (born 27 May 1974) is an Estonian soldier.

2012–2015, he was the commander of 1st Infantry Brigade. Since 2015, he is the head of Headquarters of the Estonian Defence Forces' Operations Department.

In 2020, he was awarded with Order of the Cross of the Eagle, IV class.
