= Aivar Kokka =

Estonian military personnel. 2005–2006 (born 1968)

Aivar Kokka (born in 1968) is an Estonian military personnel.

2005–2006, he was deputy chief of 1st Infantry Brigade.

In 2014, he was awarded by the Order of the Cross of the Eagle, IV Class.
