= Kalev Infantry Battalion =

Estonian military unit

- Kalevi jalaväepataljon
- Insignia of the Kalev Infantry Battalion
- Active: 1918–1940; 1992–2002; 2009–present
- Country: Estonia
- Branch: Estonian Land Forces
- Type: Mechanized infantry
- Size: Battalion
- Part of: 1st Infantry Brigade
- Garrison/HQ: Jõhvi
- Anniversaries: 20 December
- Engagements: Estonian War of Independence

Commanders
- Current commander: Lieutenant colonel Vladimir Kolotõgin
- Notable commanders: Otto Tief

Insignia
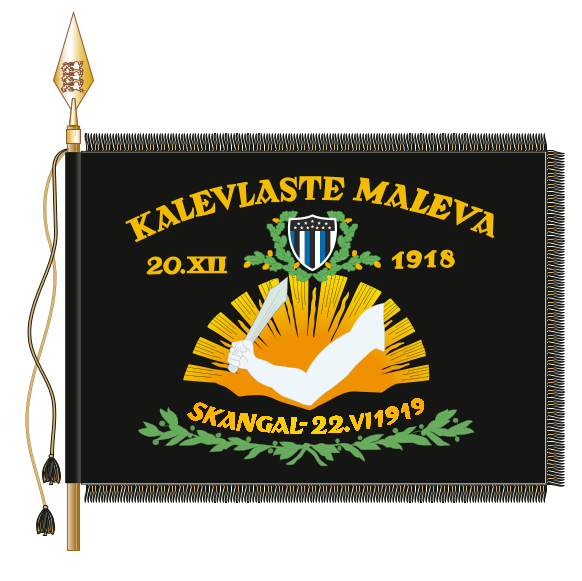
- Flag

The Kalev Infantry Battalion (Estonian: Kalevi jalaväepataljon) is an infantry battalion of the Estonian Land Forces. It is a part of the 1st Infantry Brigade and its primary task is to train conscription-based mechanized infantry units. The battalion has been previously known as the Kalevlaste Maleva and as the Kalev Single Infantry Battalion. The battalion is currently based at Jõhvi.

== History ==
=== 1918–1940 ===
Formed as Kalevlaste Malev in the beginning of the Estonian War of Independence on 20 December 1918, the battalion was named after the multi-sport club Kalev, whose members founded the unit. The battalion fought in the Estonian War of Independence on the Eastern front against Soviet Russia and in Latvia against the Baltische Landeswehr. After the war, Kalevlaste Malev was moved to Võru in 1920.

Kalevlaste Malev continued to operate training conscripts and guarding the border. On 1 July 1922, Kalevlaste Maleva was officially renamed Kalev Battalion and added to the 10th Infantry Regiment. On 28 October 1928, 10th Infantry Regiment was disbanded and Kalev Battalion was renamed Kalev Single Infantry Battalion, and moved to Tallinn. After the Soviet occupation in 1940, the battalion was disbanded.

=== 1992–present ===
Kalev Single Infantry Battalion was restored on 18 March 1992, and was initially based at Kose, but moved to Jägala Army Base in the summer. The battalion was equipped with BTR-80 armoured personnel carriers and BRDM-2 armoured scout cars. In 2002, the battalion was disbanded as a part of the reforms in the Estonian Defence Forces. Majority of the troops and armoured vehicles were transferred to the Scouts Battalion at Paldiski.

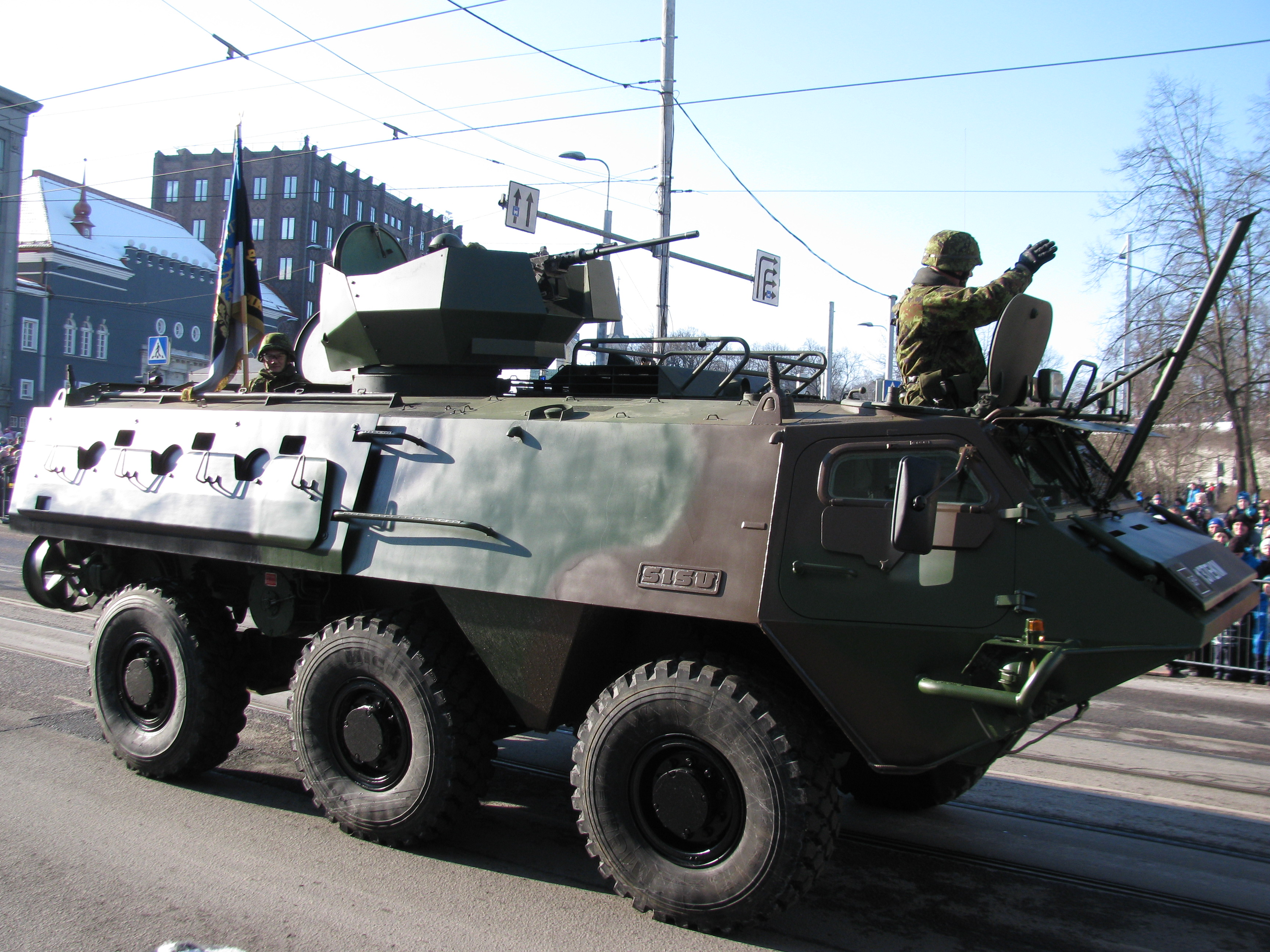
Sisu XA-180 in Estonian service.

On 1 January 2009, Kalev Infantry Battalion was restored again as a part of the 1st Infantry Brigade at Paldiski. The battalion was equipped with Sisu XA-180 armoured personnel carriers and participates in training professional soldiers for international missions and conscripts for mechanized infantry reserve units.

The battalion relocated to Jõhvi on 1 June 2020 where they now share the army base with Viru Infantry Battalion.

== Current structure ==
Kalev Infantry Battalion:

- Battalion Headquarters
  - Infantry Company
  - Combat Service Support Company
  - Staff and Support Company

== List of commanders ==
- Leopold Tõnson 1918–1919
- Otto Tief 1919–1920
- Oskar Luiga 1920–1921
- Friedrich Karl Pinka 1921–1925
- Anders Linquist 1925–1928
- Jakob Vende 1928–1934
- Johannes Uuskam 1934–1936
- Olav Mullas 1936–1937
- Vassili Külaots 1937–1940
- Albert Helme 1992–1993
- Alar Laneman 1993–1994
- Hannes Toomsalu 1994–1995
- Margus Lillemägi 1995–1996
- Artur Tiganik 1996–2000
- Sander Keskküla 2000
- Raul Tõnnov 2000–2001
- Margus Koplimägi 2009–2012
- Hannes Alesmaa 2012–2015
- Mait Müürisepp 2015–2019
- Ain Tiidrus 2019–2022
- Argo Sibul 2022–2025
- Vladimir Kolotõgin 2025–present

== See also ==
- 1st Infantry Brigade
