= 1st Division (Estonia) =

Estonian military unit

1. Diviis; 1st Division
- Active: 1918–1940
- Country: Estonia
- Branch: Estonian Army
- Type: Infantry
- Garrison/HQ: Rakvere, Estonia
- Engagements: Estonian War of Independence

Commanders
- First commander: Major General Aleksander Tõnisson
- Last commander: Major General Aleksander Pulk

The 1st Division was one of the three Estonian divisions created during the Estonian War of Independence, which was active until the Soviet occupation of Estonia.

== Estonian War of Independence ==
On 16 November 1918, the Estonian Provisional Government made the decision to create an armed force of volunteers. It was decided that army would consist of a single division which would have six infantry regiments, one cavalry regiment, one artillery regiment, and one engineering battalion. Major General Aleksander Tõnisson was assigned commander of the division, with Colonel Jaan Rink as chief of staff. However, when the Estonian War of Independence started on 28 November 1918 with the Soviet attack on Narva, the Estonian Army numbered only 2,200 to 2,300 men, with the bulk of the fighting actually conducted by the paramilitary Defence League.

Soviet forces included the 6th Red Rifle Division at Narva and the 2nd Novgorod Division south of Lake Peipus. After losing at Narva a period of retreat began for the 1st Division. Advancing against weak Estonian defences the Red Army captured Valga on 18 December, Tartu on 22 December, and Tapa on 24 December. In order to conduct a more flexible defence of South Estonia, a separate 2nd Division was formed on 24 December under command of Colonel Viktor Puskar. By the end of the year the Soviets had advanced to within 34 kilometres (21 mi) of the capital, Tallinn.

By the beginning of 1919 the Estonian Army had been increased to 13,000 men, with 5,700 on the front facing 8,000 Soviets. The strengthened Estonian Army stopped the 7th Red Army's advance on 2–5 January 1919, and went on the counter-offensive on 7 January. Tapa was liberated two days later with the support of armoured trains, followed by Rakvere on 12 January. With the aim of capturing Narva, a 1,000 strong Finnish-Estonian force was landed at Utria on 17 January, in the rear of the 6th Rifle Division, cutting off the Soviet forces west of them. On 18 January Narva was liberated. Subsequently, the north eastern front stabilized along the Narva river. Over the course of 11 days the 1st Division had advanced 200 kilometres (120 mi).

After repulsing the Soviet forces in North Estonia the 1st Division was involved in active combat near Narva. During spring the Red Army made several unsuccessful attacks against 1st Division positions. By April 11,000 Estonians of the 1st Division were facing 16,000 Soviets near Narva, during which the main Soviet effort was concentrated in South Estonia. After the White Russian Northern Corps' (later renamed to Northwest Army) offensive against Soviet forces began to fail in June at the hands of the 7th Red Army, the front was stabilized on Luga River and Saba River with support of the 1st Division. In July and August the 1st Division was involved in heavy fighting with Soviet forces in that area.

At the end of September 1919, the Northwest Army had initiated a new attack on Petrograd, but was repelled by the Red Army in November. The 7th and 15th Soviet Armies advancing behind the collapsing White Russian forces continued to attack fortified positions along the Estonian border near Narva. The first clashes took place on the Luga River on 16 November, starting the final battles of war with 120,000 Soviets facing just 40,000 Estonians. After repeated attacks on the fortified Estonian positions, the 7th Red Army managed to achieve limited success. At the end of November the situation on front calmed as the Soviets needed to replenish their forces. In order to exert pressure on Estonia in the peace talks, intensive Soviet attacks resumed on 7 December.

On 16 December there was critical breakthrough, with the 15th Soviet Army crossing the Narva River, however the Estonian counter-attack the following day successfully pushed the Soviets back. The Estonian high command actively reinforced the 1st Division at Narva during the fighting, dispatching the 3rd Division command, while general Tõnisson became commander of whole Viru Front. He was replaced as 1st Division commander by Colonel Otto Heinze. After suffering 35,000 casualties in the heavy battles, the Red Army was completely exhausted by the end of December. A ceasefire came into effect on 3 January 1920.

== Postwar Period 1920–1940 ==
After the Estonian War of Independence, the 1st Division relocated to Northern and Northeastern Estonia, with its headquarters in Rakvere. On 15 March 1924, all 3 divisions of the Estonian Defence Forces rearranged their artillery formations, with the 1st Division changing their artillery organization into two formations: the 1st Artillery Regiment and the 2nd Fortress Artillery Division.

By the decision of the State Elder on 1 February 1940, the landmass of the Republic of Estonia was divided into four divisions, with the divisions in turn divided into military districts:

- 1st Division: Narva Military District and Viru-Järva Military District.
- 2nd Division : Tartu Military District and Võru-Pechory Military District.
- 3rd Division : Harju Military District and Lääne-Saare Military District.
- 4th Division : Pärnu-Viljandi Military District and Valga Military District.

== Structure ==
=== Divisional Structure 1918 ===
Units comprising the 1st Division 1918:

- 1st Infantry Regiment (Major-General Ernst Põdder)
- 2nd Infantry Regiment (Colonel J. Unt)
- 3rd Infantry Regiment (Lieutenant-Colonel E. Kubbo)
- 4th Infantry Regiment (Colonel Aleksander Seiman)
- 5th Infantry Regiment (Lieutenant-Colonel Nikolai Reek)
- 6th Infantry Regiment (Lieutenant-Colonel Viktor Puskar)
- Cavalry Regiment (Rittmeister Gustav Jonson)
- Engineering Battalion (Captain Voldemar Riiberg)

=== Divisional Structure 1919 ===
- 1st Infantry Regiment
- 4th Single Infantry Battalion
- 5th Single Infantry Battalion
- Armoured Train Regiment
- 1st Artillery Group
- 2nd Artillery Group

=== Divisional Structure 1921 ===
- 1st Infantry Division
- 4th Infantry Division
- 9th Infantry Division
- 1st Artillery Brigade
- 2nd Heavy Artillery Fort Division
- Baltic Battalion
- Inger Battalion
- 1st Division Reserve Battalion

=== Divisional Structure 1939 ===
- Division command and general staff: Division headquarters in Narve,
  - Division commander: Major General Aleksander Pulk, From 8 November 1939 Colonel Paul Triik
  - Chief of Staff: Colonel Ants Matsalo
  - Artillery commander: Lieutenant Colonel Erich Toffer
- 1st Infantry Regiment
- 4th Single Infantry Battalion
- 5th Single Infantry Battalion
- Armored Train Regiment
- 1st Artillery Group
- 2nd Artillery Group
- 1st Anti-Tank Company
- Pioneer Battalion

== See also ==
- 2nd Division
- 3rd Division
- 4th Division
- Estonian Division
