= Tapa Army Base =

Military base in Tapa, Estonia

- Tapa sõjaväelinnak
- Tapa, Estonia

Site information
- Type: Army base
- Owner: Estonian Defence Forces
- Operator: 1st Infantry Brigade

Location
- Coordinates: 59°14′43.09″N 25°57′16.09″E

Site history
- Built: 1939
- In use: 1939-present

Garrison information
- Garrison: 1st Infantry Brigade
- Occupants: Scouts Battalion; Engineer Battalion; Artillery Regiment; Air Defence Battalion; Combat Service Support Battalion; NATO eFP Battalion

Tapa Army Base (Estonian: Tapa sõjaväelinnak), which lies to the south of the town Tapa, is the largest military base in Estonia. The base is next to the Central Training Area, excellent for artillery live-fire exercises and tracked unit maneuvers.

== History ==
Tapa Army Base is one of the few former Soviet military facilities that was taken over by the Estonian Defence Forces in the early 1990s. The oldest facility is the airfield, which was built in the autumn of 1939 by the Red Army. After the end of World War II and the Soviet recapture of Estonia, the area of the base was enlarged, it totaled around 9 square kilometres (3.5 sq mi). The Soviet Air Defence Forces later stationed the 656th Fighter Regiment equipped with 40 MiG-23MLD fighters at Tapa Airfield. In the 1960s the base received a tank and a pioneer training regiment. During the Soviet exploitation of the base, a lot of ecological damage was done, mainly due to the poor handling of oil and other fuels.

== Present day ==
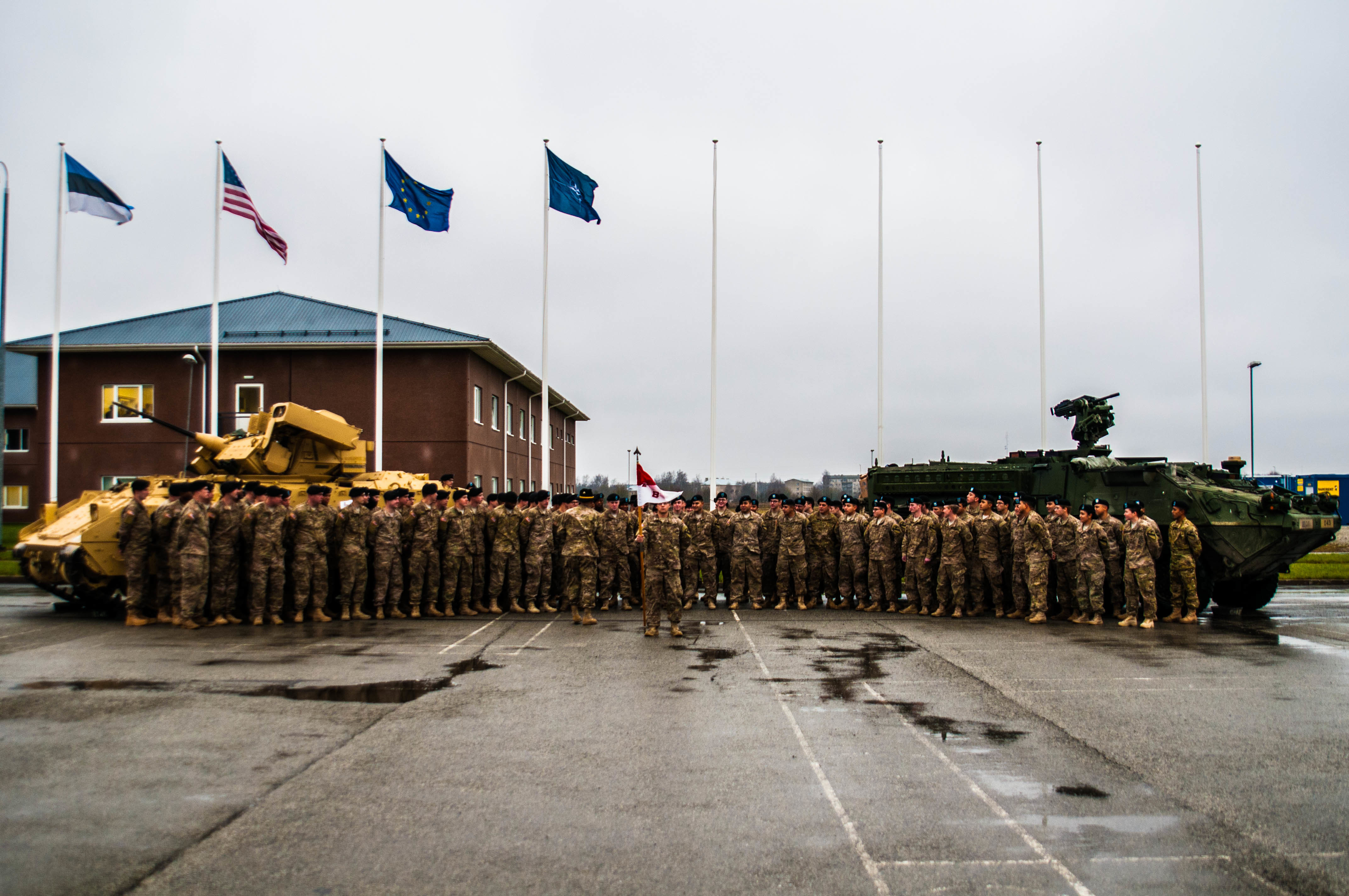
Soldiers from B Co., 2nd Battalion, 8th Cavalry Regiment, 1st Brigade, 1st Cavalry Division, from Fort Hood, Texas, stand in formation ready to receive the Prime Minister of Estonia on Tuesday, November 11, 2014. The Prime Minister visited the U.S. troops during "Atlantic Resolve," a multinational combined arms exercise to enhance interoperability in view of the growing Russian threat to the Baltic States.

There are eight barracks in the compound and two more are being constructed. Three of the new barracks are for the NATO Enhanced Forward Presence multinational battle group in Estonia. The base canteen can serve up to 3200 personnel. There are repair shops, garages, study halls, and shelters in the base.

In the future tracked armored maneuver units will be relocated to the Tapa military base. Maintenance facilities and shelters will be built for armored and unarmored vehicles.

=== Military units ===
The Tapa Army Base accommodates the following units:

- Headquarters of the 1st Infantry Brigade together with HQ and Signals company and Reconnaissance company
- Scouts Battalion
- Engineer Battalion including Engineer School
- Artillery Regiment including Artillery School
- Air Defence Battalion including Air Defense School
- Combat Service Support Battalion
- NATO Enhanced Forward Presence (eFP) Battalion

== See also ==
- Taara Army Base
- Ämari Air Base
- Tapa town
- Tapa Airfield
