= 1st Infantry Brigade (Estonia) =

Estonian military unit

- 1. jalaväebrigaad
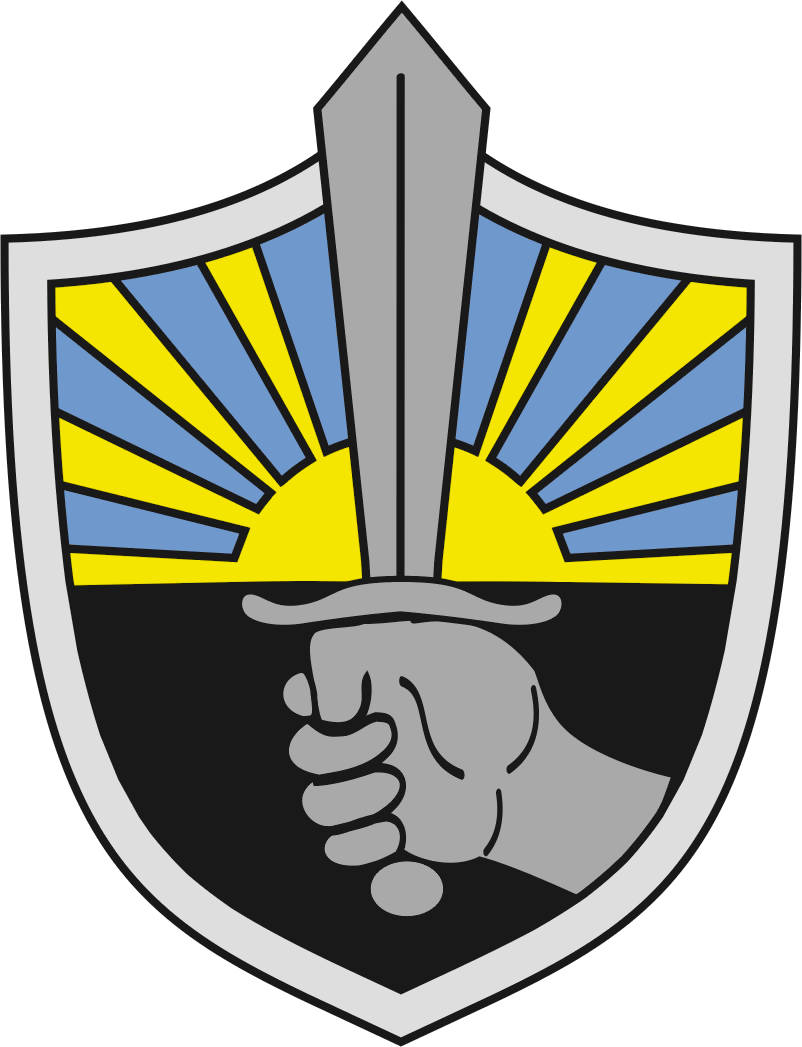
- Insignia of the 1st Infantry Brigade
- Active: 1917–1940; 2003–present
- Country: Estonia
- Branch: Estonian Land Forces
- Type: Infantry
- Size: Brigade
- Part of: Estonian Division
- Garrison/HQ: Tapa Army Base; Jõhvi garrison Paldiski garrison
- Anniversaries: Formed: 25 April 1917; Restored: 1 February 2003

Commanders
- Current commander: Colonel Tarmo Kundla

Insignia
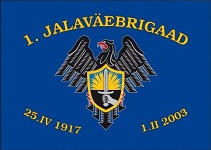
- Flag

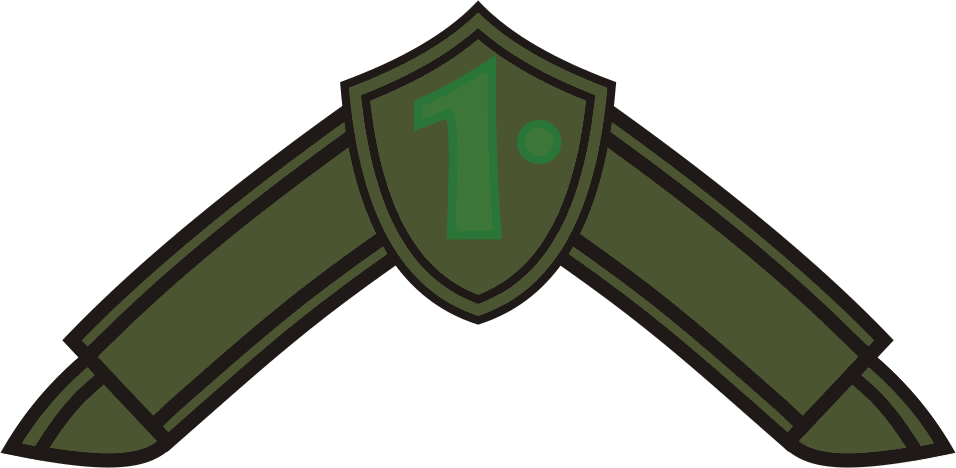
- Unit Insignia

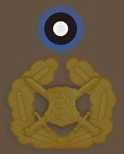
- Uniform Insignia

The 1st Infantry Brigade (Estonian: 1. jalaväebrigaad) is an infantry brigade of the Estonian Land Forces. It is the primary military unit in Northern Estonia. The brigade headquarters is based at Tapa. The 1st Infantry Brigade represents the main manoeuvre unit for the Estonian Defence Forces.

== History ==
On 25 April 1917, the 2nd Naval Fortress Regiment of the Peter the Great's Naval Fortress was formed in Tallinn, recruited from Estonians. In May 1917, the regiment was renamed 1st Estonian Infantry Regiment. From 1918 to 1920, the unit fought in the Estonian War of Independence. The unit was disbanded after the Soviet occupation in 1940.

On 1 February 2003, the 1st Infantry Brigade was formed in Tallinn. In 2006, the brigade headquarters was moved to Paldiski. On 1 January 2009, the brigade was formed around three battalions: Scouts Battalion, Kalev Infantry Battalion, and the Combat Service Support Battalion. On 1 August 2014, Viru Infantry Battalion, Engineer Battalion, Air Defence Battalion and Artillery Battalion of the former North-Eastern Defence District were added to the 1st Infantry Brigade and headquarters was moved to Tapa.

== Structure ==
1st Infantry Brigade:

- Headquarters (Tapa)
- Headquarters Support and Signal Company (Tapa)
- Scouts Battalion (Tapa)
- Kalev Infantry Battalion (Jõhvi)
- Viru Infantry Battalion (Jõhvi)
- Artillery Battalion (Tapa)
- Air Defence Battalion (Tapa)
- Engineer Battalion (Tapa)
- Combat Service Support Battalion (Tapa)
- Anti-Tank Company (Jõhvi)

Around 1800 conscripts are serving at different units of the brigade at the same time along with professional soldiers. The number of conscripts changes year-to-year, but is generally on the rise.

=== Equipment ===
Brigades' units are armed with CV9035EE infantry fighting vehicles, Pasi XA188EST, XA180EST armoured personnel carriers, K9 Thunder and CAESAR self-propelled howitzers, FH70 and D30 towed-howitzers, Mistral and ZU-23-2 anti-aircraft systems, Javelin and Spike anti-tank missiles. The Brigade uses a fleet of MB Unimog, MB Actros, Volvo FMX, DAF and Scania trucks, BV-206 amphibious carriers and MB GD240 jeeps.

At the end of 2024, both infantry brigades of the Estonian Defence Forces have received new armored personnel carriers from Turkey; the Otokar ARMA 6x6 and NMS 4x4 models. A total of 230 vehicles of both models (130 and 100 respectively) are to be delivered to the Estonian Defence Forces.

== List of commanders ==
- Toivo Treima 16 June 2003 – 1 August 2005
- Aivar Kokka (acting) 2 August 2005 – 31 March 2006
- Raivo Lumiste 1 April 2006 – 5 September 2006
- Artur Tiganik 18 September 2006 – 7 April 2009
- Märt Plakk (acting) 8 April 2009 – 30 June 2009
- Margus Rebane (acting) 1 July 2009 – 23 August 2009
- Raivo Tamm 24 August 2009 – 2 October 2010
- Urmas Nigul 3 October 2010 – 31 July 2012
- Aron Kalmus 1 August 2012 – 31 July 2015
- Veiko-Vello Palm 1 August 2015 – 3 August 2018
- Vahur Karus 3 August 2018 – 17 June 2021
- Andrus Merilo 17 June 2021 - ?
- Tarmo Kundla 29 April 2024 - present

== See also ==
- Estonian Land Forces
- 2nd Infantry Brigade
- Estonian Defence Forces
