= Anti-Tank Company, 1st Infantry Brigade (Estonia) =

Estonian military unit

Anti-Tank Company
- Tankitõrjekompanii
- Insignia of the Anti-Tank Company
- Country: Estonia
- Branch: Estonian Land Forces
- Role: Anti-tank warfare
- Size: Company
- Part of: 1st Infantry Brigade
- Garrison/HQ: Jõhvi

Commanders
- Current commander: Major Silver Altmäe

The Anti-Tank Company (Estonian: Tankitõrjekompanii) is an anti-tank warfare company of the Estonian Land Forces. It is a part of the 1st Infantry Brigade and its primary task is to train conscription-based anti-tank defence units. The company is currently based at Jõhvi.

== See also ==
- 1st Infantry Brigade
