= Raivo Lumiste =

Estonian military personnel

Raivo Lumiste (born on 1 August 1969 Pärnu) is an Estonian military leader.

2003 he was the commander of Baltic Battalion. 2006 he was the commander of 1st Infantry Brigade. 2006-2012 he was the commander of Estonian Defence League.

In 2002 he was awarded with Order of the Cross of the Eagle, V class.
