= 76 mm gun M1900 =

76 mm gun model 1900
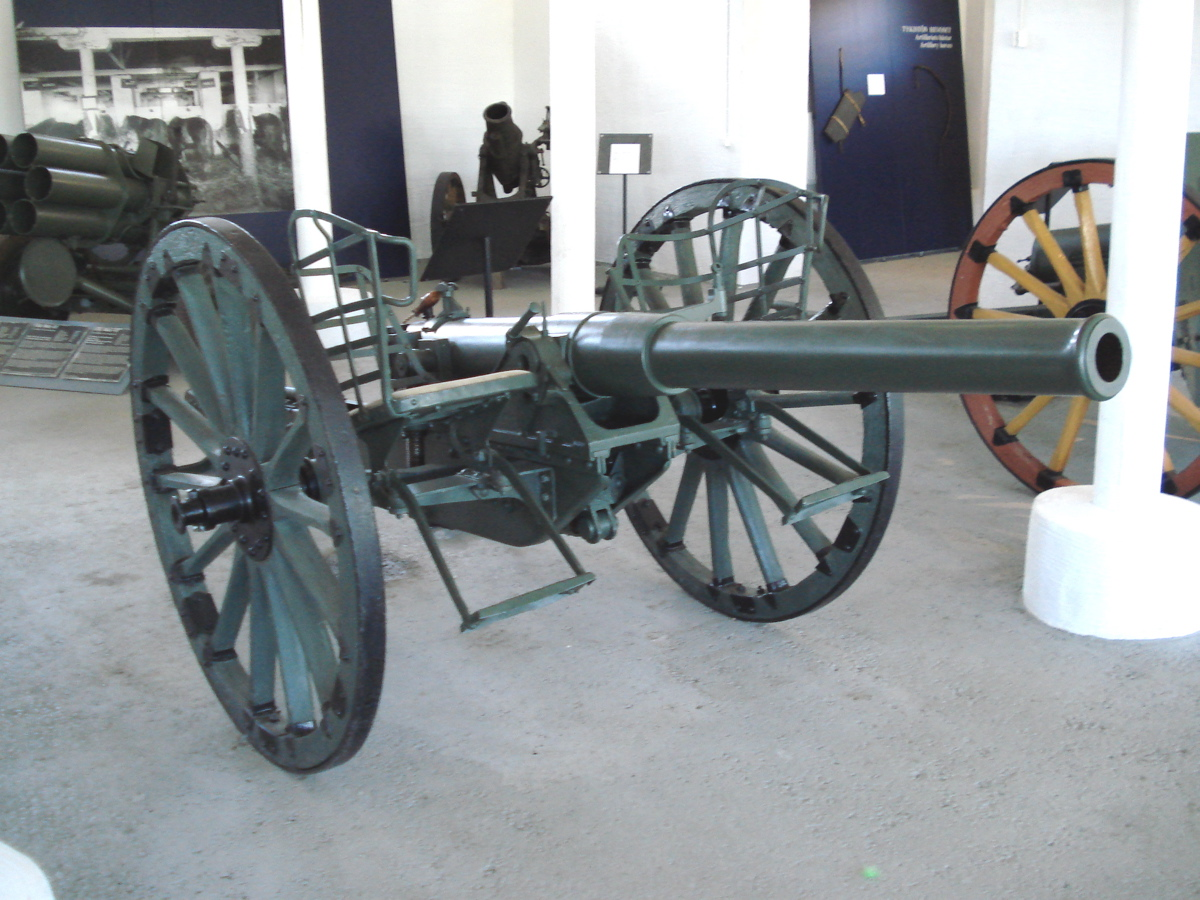
- 76 mm gun model 1900 in Hämeenlinna Artillery Museum, Finland
- Type: Field gun
- Place of origin: Russian Empire

Service history
- Wars: Boxer Rebellion; Russo-Japanese War; World War I Russian Civil War

Production history
- Produced: 1900−1903
- No. built: ~ 2300

Specifications
- Mass: combat: ca. 1,000 kg (2,200 lbs)
- Barrel length: 31 calibers
- Crew: 3-4
- Caliber: 76.2 mm (3 in)
- Breech: interrupted screw
- Recoil: Oil/india-rubber rings
- Carriage: fixed trail
- Elevation: −6° to 11°
- Traverse: 2.5°
- Effective firing range: 7.5 km (4.66 mi)
- Maximum firing range: 8.5 km (5.28 mi)

The 76 mm gun model 1900 (Russian: 76-мм пушка образца 1900 года), also called 76 mm Putilov M1900 gun, was a light quick-firing field gun of the Imperial Russian Army used in the Russo-Japanese War, World War I, Russian Civil War and a number of interwar armed conflicts with participants from the former Russian Empire (Soviet Union, Poland and Finland).

== History ==
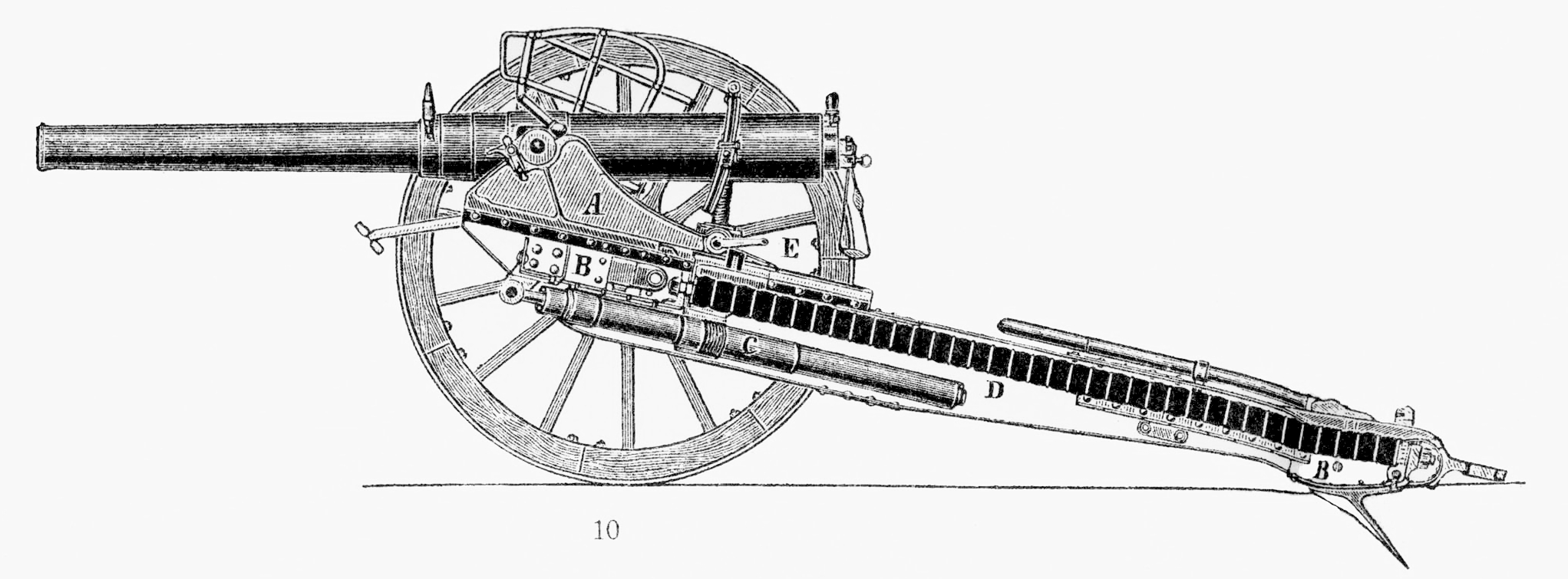
Cross-section of the 3-inch quick-firing gun M1900 carriage. You can clearly identify the upper and the lower gun-carriage as well as the trail with the recoil-mechanism.

The M1900 has been developed in 1900 by engineers of the Putilov Plants. Since 1898 the Imperial Russian Army was looking for a new field-gun and Krupp, Shamona and Schneider sent in their designs. The decision was made in favor for the M1900 and it became the first Russian gun with a recoil system and at the same time the first Russian 76.2-millimetre field gun.

The guns were manufactured in the St. Petersburg Plants.

== Employment ==
The M1900 saw its first action in the Russo-Japanese War, and had better rate of fire and range than its Japanese counterpart, the Type 31 75 mm Field Gun and in particular, the Type 31 75 mm Mountain Gun. The Japanese knew about this disadvantage and compensated for it with numerical superiority.

The gun saw further deployment during World War I. Though technically obsolete a number of M1900s appeared in the first part of the war to replace heavy losses the Russian Army suffered in the opening battles of 1914, but as soon as the successor of the M1900, the 76 mm divisional gun M1902, became available they were withdrawn.

In the Russian Civil War in 1917/18 the M1900 was used by both parties.

Soon afterwards the new Red Army sold or handed over some M1900s to some of the new Baltic States and such nations under Soviet influence such as Finland. Poland also received some of the guns and converted the original 76.2-mm (3-in) to 75-mm (2.95-in) caliber to match their existing artillery which consisted of French-made Canon de 75.

In 1918 there were twenty-one 76 mm M1900 guns in Finland.

== Specifications ==
The gun has an upper and a lower gun-carriage. The upper gun-carriage slides, resting on grooves along the rail of the lower gun-carriage. In the trail is an oil buffer, acting as a recoil brake, which includes 40 India-rubber doughnuts which were compressed when the gun was fired. After the recoil stroke the doughnuts expanded again and the barrel returned into firing position.

The barrel is reinforced with a thermal sleeve.

The breech-block equipped with a so-called French turn breech-block with a turn bar, the first one on a Russian gun. The recoil system of the gun did not turn out to be sufficiently effective and that is why the number of manufactured guns remained low.

- Calibre: 76.2 mm
- Length of barrel: 31.4 cal
- Weight of projectile: 6.4 kg
- Muzzle velocity: 590 m/s
- Maximum range: 6.7 km
- Elevation: −6° to +11°
- Traverse: ± 2.5°
- Weight (in firing position): ca. 1,000 kg (2,200 lbs)

== Gallery ==
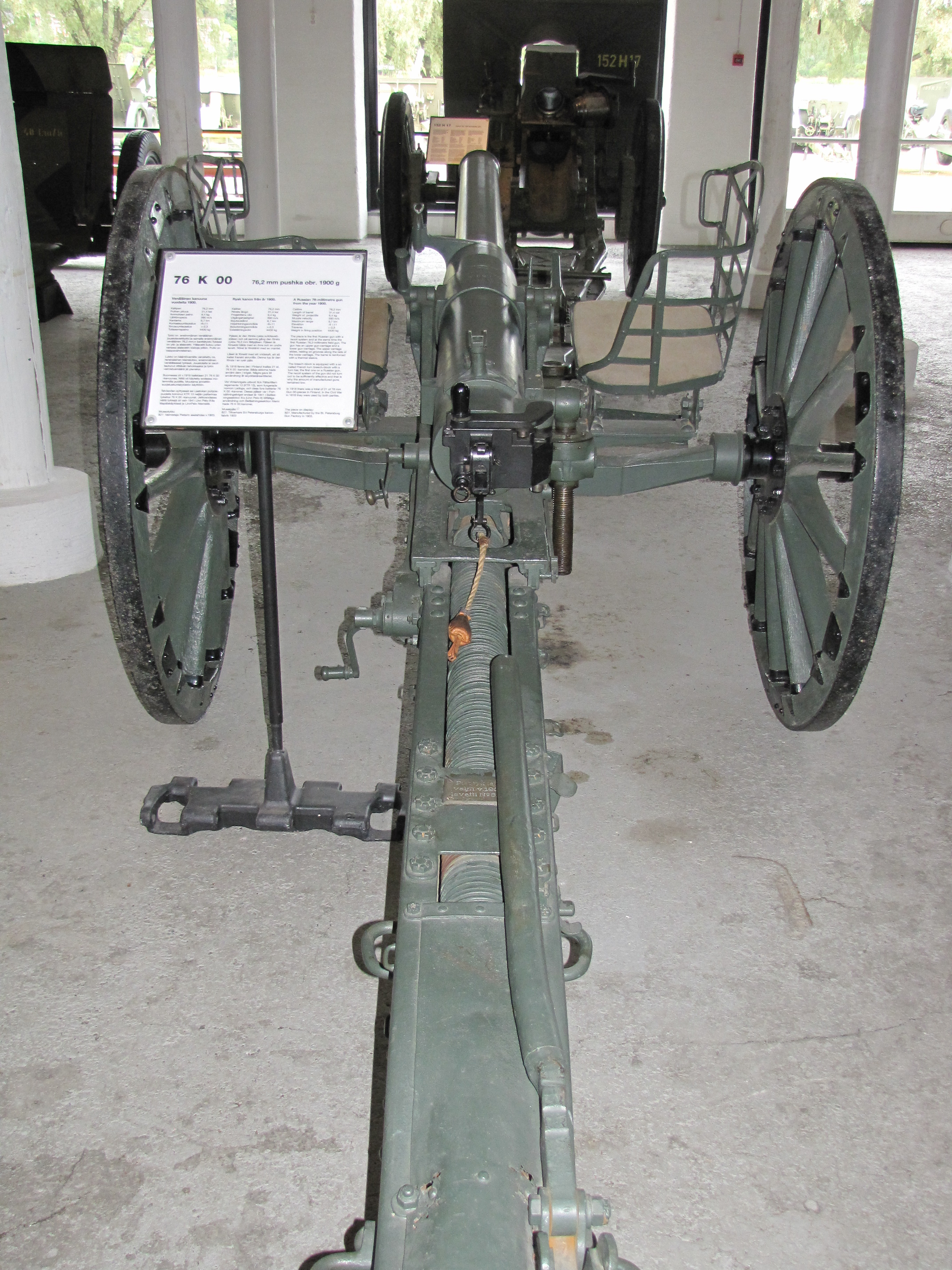
A M1900 in the Hämeenlinna Artillery Museum, Finland.

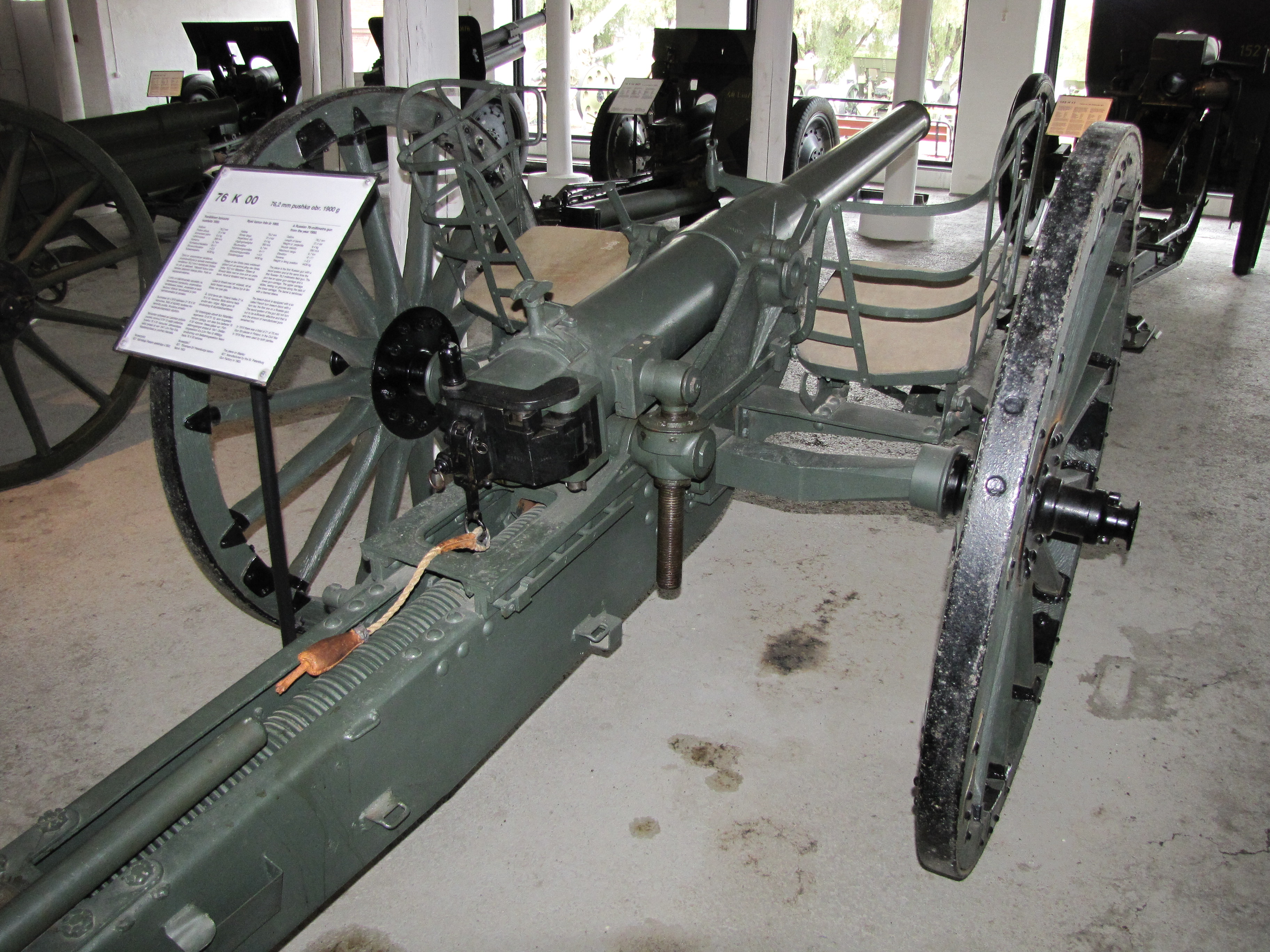
A M1900 in the Hämeenlinna Artillery Museum, Finland.

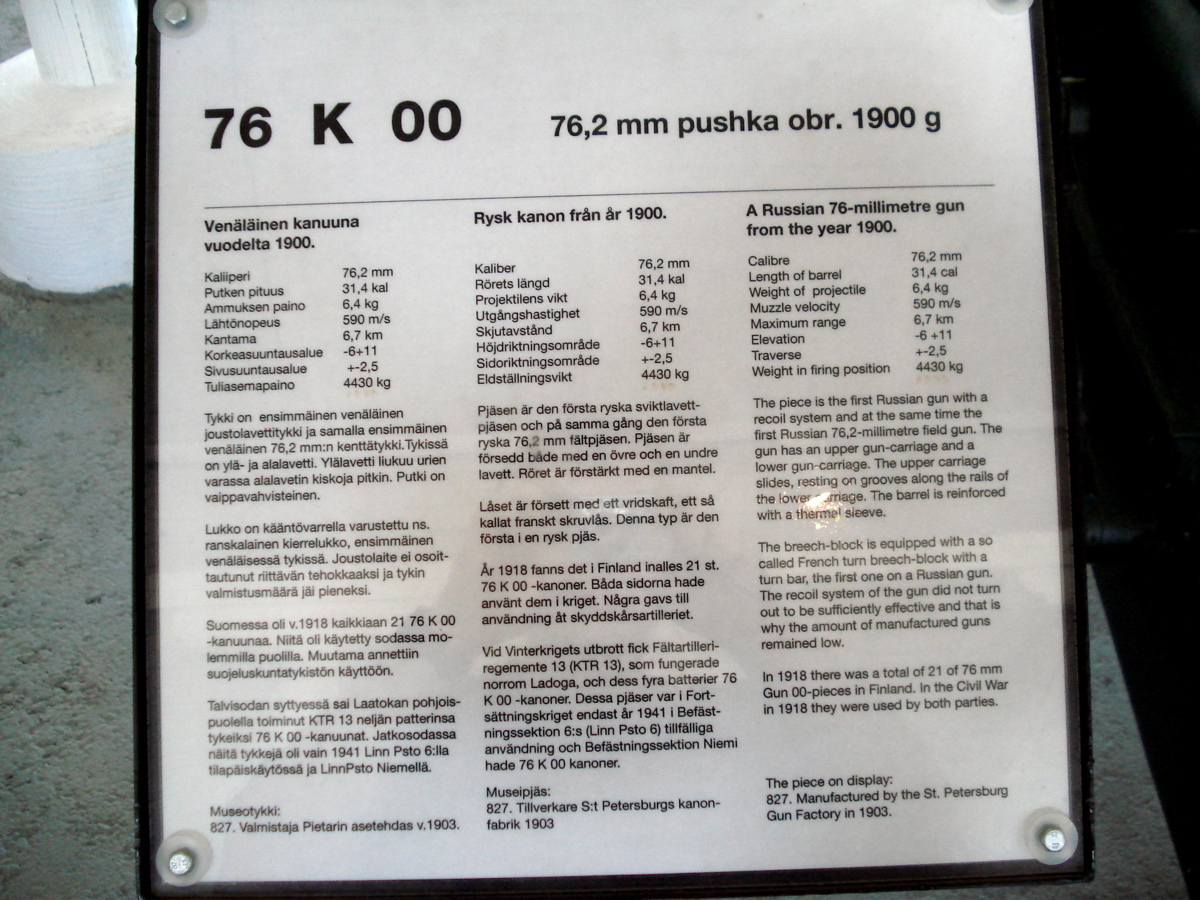
Info-board of the M1900 in the Hämeenlinna Artillery Museum, Finland.

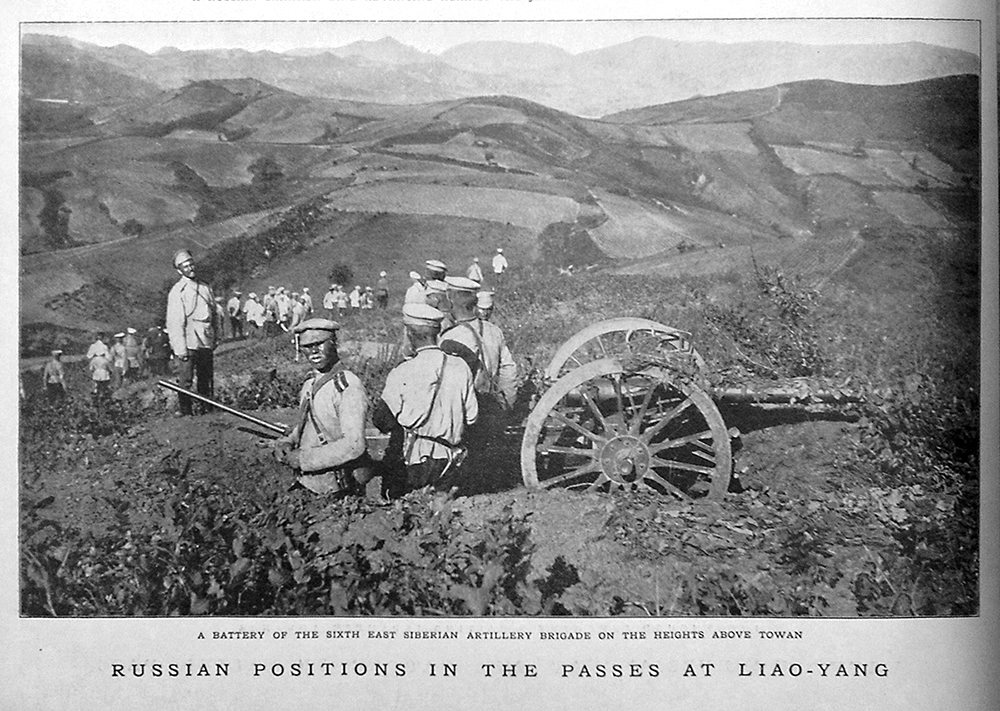
Dug in M1900 of the 3rd Siberian Army Corps, 1904

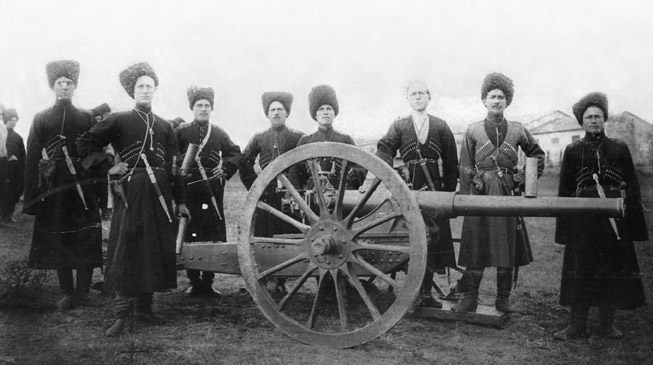
Cossacks with a M1900, 1914
