= Scouts Battalion =

Estonian military unit

- Scoutspataljon
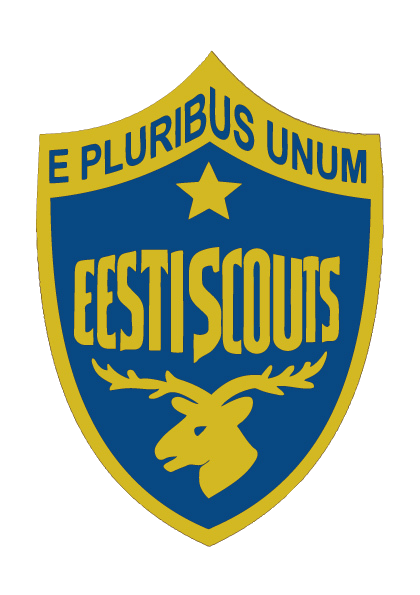
- Insignia of the Scouts Battalion
- Active: 1918–1940; 2001–present
- Country: Estonia
- Branch: Estonian Land Forces
- Type: Mechanized infantry
- Size: Battalion
- Part of: 1st Infantry Brigade
- Garrison/HQ: Tapa Army Base
- Motto: E Pluribus Unum
- Anniversaries: Formed: 21 December 1918; Restored: 29 March 2001
- Engagements: Estonian War of Independence; Iraq War; War in Afghanistan; Mali War: Operation Barkhane; Operation Inherent Resolve
- Website: https://scoutspataljon.ee/

Commanders
- Current commander: Lieutenant colonel Madis Koosa
- Notable commanders: Friedrich-Karl Pinka; Andrus Merilo

Insignia
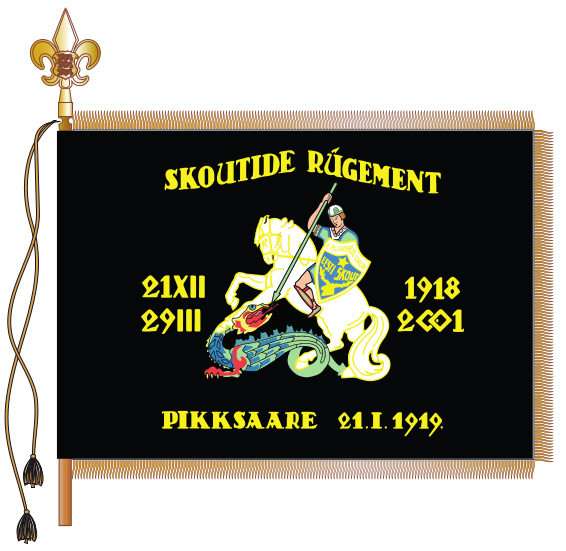
- Flag

The Scouts Battalion is a professionally trained manoeuvre unit prepared for independent combat and having rapid response capability within the 1st Infantry Brigade. The unit is based at Tapa Military Base.

Scouts Battalion is known for its use of CV9035EE Infantry Fighting Vehicles and CV90 Support Vehicles.

In August 2026, Scouts Battalion acquired CAESAR Mk.1 Self-Propelled Howitzers under a newly formed subunit, the Self-Propelled Artillery Platoon.

== History ==
=== Estonian War of Independence ===
In November 1918, Estonian American entrepreneur and scouting enthusiast Henry Reissar returned to Estonia and turned to the Ministry of Defence (then Ministry of War) with a proposition of forming a voluntary military unit, financed by himself, in order to help defend Estonia. Having received such permission, the unit was formed on 21 December 1918 in Viljandi, where the first volunteers took their oaths in the ruins of Viljandi Castle, and Friedrich-Karl Pinka was appointed commander of the newly formed unit. On 3 January 1919, the company-sized unit was sent to the front against the Red Army. On 23 January 1919, a 43-man unit of Scouts captured the Pikksaare Train Station, defended by 524 Red Army troops. The Scouts fought mostly alongside armoured train units and acquitted themselves well in combat, manifesting greater morale than the regular conscript units. The Scouts took part in several major battles including the attack against the Krasnaya Gorka fort in October 1919 and the Battle of Krivasoo in November – December 1919. On 1 December 1919, the Scouts Regiment (Scoutspolk) was formed as a part of the Armoured Train Division.

=== 1920–1940 ===
After the signing of the Peace Treaty of Tartu, many servicemen were demobilized and returned to civilian life. From 1921-28, the Scouts unit was reduced in size and continued to serve as a part of the 2nd, 5th, 6th and 10th Infantry Regiment. On 1 October 1928, the unit was renamed Scouts Single Infantry Battalion. The battalion was based at Tallinn, from where it was moved to Uuemõisa in 1932. After the Soviet occupation in 1940, the battalion was disbanded.

=== 2001–present ===
The Scouts Battalion was restored on 29 March 2001, as a fully professional unit. The Scouts Battalion has actively participated in international operations together with other NATO, European Union and United Nations member states, including the Iraq War and the War in Afghanistan. The battalion is currently equipped with Combat Vehicle 90 infantry fighting vehicles and Patria Pasi armoured personnel carriers. In 2018, fifty soldiers of the battalion were sent to contribute to the Operation Barkhane in Mali. In 2019, an additional forty-five soldiers were sent.

== Current structure ==
Scouts Battalion:

- Battalion Headquarters
  - A Infantry Company
  - B Infantry Company
  - C Infantry Company
  - Combat Support Company
  - Staff and Support Company

== List of commanders ==
- Artur Tiganik 2001–2004
- Indrek Sirel 2005–2006
- Aivar Kokka 2006–2009
- Vahur Karus 2009–2013
- Andrus Merilo 2013–2016
- Tarmo Kundla 2016–2019
- Eero Aija 2019-2022
- Ranno Raudsik 2022–2025
- Madis Koosa 2025–present

== See also ==
- 1st Infantry Brigade
