= Air Defence Battalion (Estonia) =

Estonian military unit

16th Air Defence Battalion
- Õhutõrjepataljon
- Emblem of the Air Defence Battalion
- Active: 1928–1940; 1992–present
- Country: Estonia
- Branch: Estonian Land Forces
- Role: Anti-aircraft warfare
- Size: Battalion
- Part of: 1st Infantry Brigade
- Garrison/HQ: Tapa
- Anniversaries: 1 October

Commanders
- Current commander: Lieutenant colonel Robert Rajaste
- Sergeant Major of the Battalion: Sergeant Major Kainar Kruus

The 16th Air Defence Battalion (Estonian: Õhutõrjepataljon; formerly known as the Air Defence Division, Õhutõrjedivisjon) is the Estonian Defence Forces air-defence artillery force which has a supportive military formation role among the Estonian Land Forces. Other units might have an anti-aircraft missile component, but the Air Defence Battalion is a unit dedicated to air-defence and relying on other units for infantry support, especially when defending. The main task of this formation is to provide air-defence protection and light gun support for the infantry brigades operating on the battlefield.

== History ==
The official history of the Õhutõrjepataljon begins in 1928 when on October 1 an air-defence artillery group was established. This date is also held as the anniversary of unit.

With the restoration of independence in Estonia the unit was re-established. On May 22, 1992, a Single Radiotechnical Air Defence Battalion was created under the branch of the Air Force. From 1992 to 1996 the unit main task was mainly to guard the former Soviet military bases which were taken over gradually by the Estonian Defence Forces during the Soviet department from Estonia. On May 1, 1997, the military formation was renamed into Õhutõrjedivisjon and later in the same year the unit was redesignated under the Ground Force command. Till 2003 the majority of the unit was based in Tallinn and in smaller numbers in Tapa. Since January 1, 2004, the formation now operates in Tapa garrison and is part of the Kirde Defence District. On July 1, 2008, the Õhutõrjedivisjon was renamed into Õhutõrjepataljon.

== Structure ==
The unit peacetime structure and size is in the borders of a battalion. Currently it is the only air defence role military formation among the Estonian Defence Forces. The training and combat preparations have been divided into three categories which include the:

- conscript based reserve air defence units,
- reserve units training,
- professional training for the service men among the service branch,

Components and units

The Õhutõrjepataljon has a three-month cycle of basic training, which focuses on basic soldier skills and knowledge according to the Estonian Defense Forces on global basis. Specialized training course will take place in the field of anti-aircraft training. The learning in order to be able to operate an anti-aircraft weapon as a team is carried out by anti-aircraft weapon simulators.

=== Symbols and flags ===
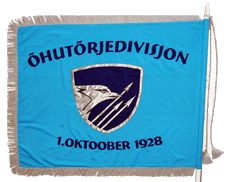
The historic battle flag of the Õhutõrjepataljon.

The official battle flag of the Air Defence Battalion dates back to the creation of the first anti-aircraft unit among the Estonian Defence Forces in 1928. As the pre-war flag has not been preserved the new flag received along with the restoration of the formation its blessing at the Kaarli Church in Tallinn on October 1, 1998. The main color of the flag is sky blue where the unit insignia is placed in the center. Above the symbol there is the original name and below is the date of the creation of the battalion written. The second half of the flag is a designed flag of Estonia. It is placed in the middle of a golden coat of arms of Estonia, the top three blue lions. Above the coat of arms is written in golden letters "To protect the homes of Estonia." Until the upper edge of the coat of arms surrounded by two golden oak branches.

The battalion soldier shoulder insignia is the classic emblem of a coin, showing the Nordic eagle's head and also three arrows. The Coat of bird is a stylized view of the Nordic Eagle's head to the right symbolizes the sky guards and an administrator. The three blade upwards arrows symbolizes the anti-aircraft for the three major components: the shock, the direction and speed.

Uniforms and badges

The uniform decoration pictures the historical Õhutõrjedivisjon badge which document and composition was approved in 2002. The Õhutõrjepataljon has a one classed service medal which was established in order to recognize the soldiers in active duty within the battalion and also to strengthen to ties between those who had previously served in the unit.

== Equipment ==
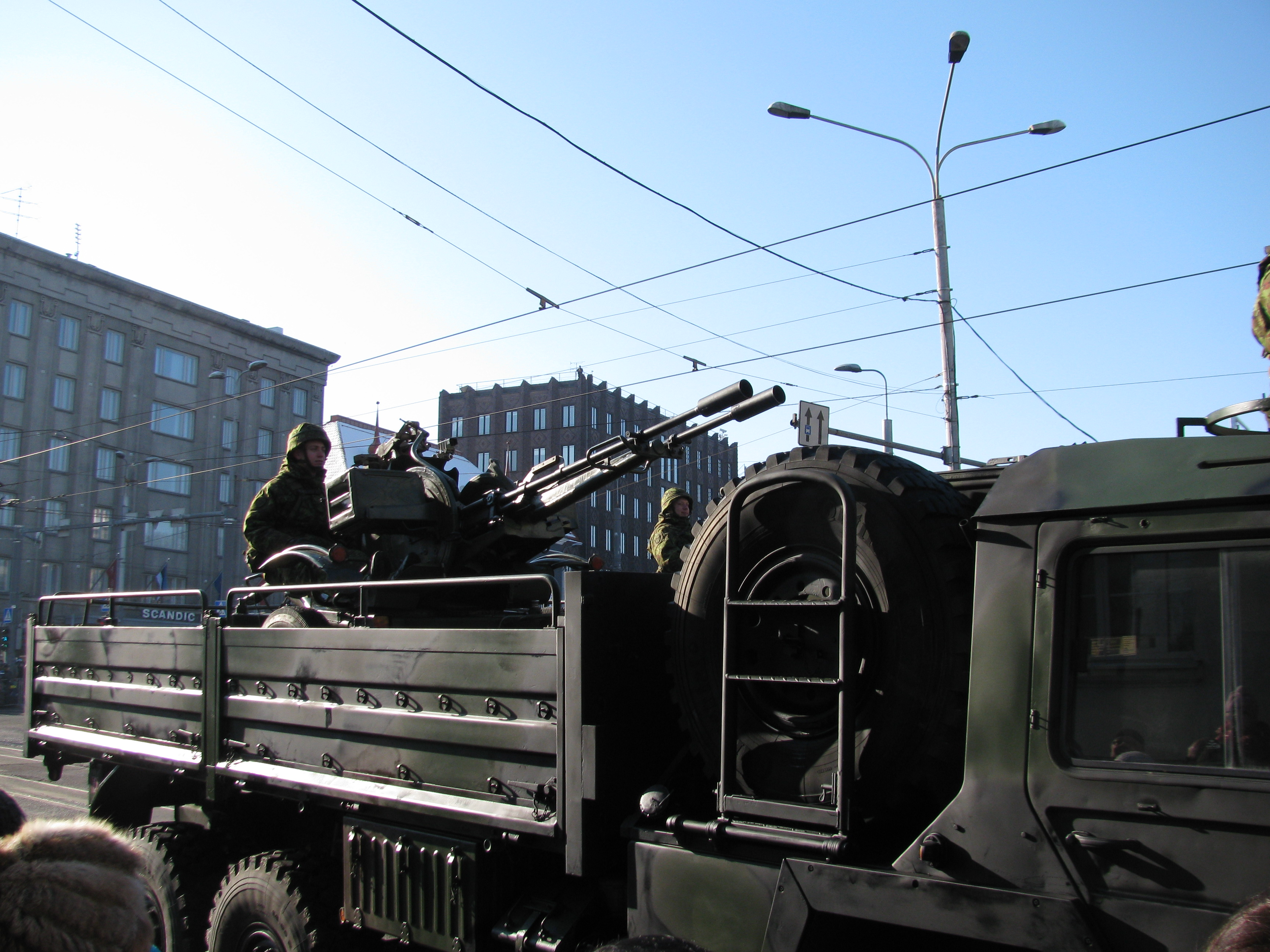
A Soviet made 23mm ZU-23-2 anti-aircraft cannon in Estonian use.

=== Historic ===
By 1934 around 180 anti-aircraft artillerists and 120 anti-aircraft machine gunners had received training within the Õhutõrjepataljon. Up till 1938 the unit main task was to maintain the operational equipment. By the summer of 1940 the unit, then called as the Õhukaitse Suurtükiväegrupp had received its technical equipment and manpower peak. The unit inventory included also the 75mm Krupp anti-air guns along with the Carl Zeiss fire guidance systems, 37mm Rheinmetall-Borsig cannons, 40mm Bofors cannons and some additional 76mm Soviet made anti-aircraft cannons. After the Soviet occupation of Estonia in mid 1940 unit was dissolved and the inventory was transferred to the Red Army. The historic weapon inventory up till 1940 included:

- 20mm anti-aircraft cannon: 12
- 37mm anti-aircraft cannon: 16
- 75mm anti-aircraft cannon: 8
- anti-aircraft machinegun: 116
- "Wikog" fire guidance system: 2

=== Current ===
The Õhutõrjepataljon is currently armed with the 23mm ZU-23-2 anti-aircraft twin autocannons and 90mm Mistral missiles. Since the battalion has no other conventional air defence weapons it is currently capable of providing a limited short-range air defence for the remaining ground units. Both of these weapon systems are integrated with the Giraffe AMB radar and fire-control systems. The current weapon inventory includes roughly:

- ZU-23-2 23mm anti-aircraft cannon: 98
- Mistral man-portable surface-to-air missile launcher: 209
- Giraffe AMB fire-control radar: 5
- IRIS-T SLM Medium range air defense system: 3
- Piorun (missile) man-portable air defense system: 100 launchers, 300 missiles

Modernization

According to the new long-term defence development plan the current air defence battalion will be gradually modernized as one of the priorities of the Estonian Ground Force is the development of capabilities to ensure air defence. According to the plan some mobile medium-range air defence units will be created and developed as along with the existing army short-range air defence capability will be enhanced through the procurement of additional weapons systems and creation of new air defence units.

== See also ==
- Air Defence Battalion (Lithuania)
