= Estonian Land Forces =

Ground force of the Estonian Defence Forces

- Maavägi
- Active: 1918–1940; 1991–present
- Country: Estonia
- Type: Army
- Role: Land warfare
- Size: 4,000 active personnel (2021); 40,000 reserve (4,000 in permanent readiness, 2025)
- Part of: Estonian Defence Forces
- Engagements: Estonian War of Independence; Kosovo Force; War in Afghanistan; Iraq War; Mali War
- Website: Official website

Insignia
- Flag

The Estonian Land Forces (Estonian: Maavägi), unofficially referred to as the Estonian Army, is the name of the unified ground forces among the Estonian Defense Forces where it has an offensive military formation role. The Estonian Land Forces is currently the largest Estonian military branch, with an average size of approximately 6,000 soldiers, conscripts, and officers during peacetime.

The Maavägi development priorities are the capability to participate in missions outside the national territory and perform operations to protect the territory of Estonia, also in co-operation with the Allies. The Maavägi component of the operational structure consists of an infantry brigade and a homeland security structure. Deployable infantry battalion tactical group and some deployable CS, CSS units will develop in the Army structure in accordance with NATO Force Proposals requirements. The infantry brigade will be a training and support frame for deployable units. Homeland security structure units can carry out territorial military tasks and support civil structures.

The Land Forces are structured according to the principle of a reserve force, which means that the main part of the State's defence forces are units in a trained reserve. The reserve units are formed on the territorial principle, i.e. conscripts from one area are called up at one time to one unit and after service, they are sent to the reserve as one unit.

== History ==
The 1st and 2nd Divisions were created during the Estonian War of Independence; the 1st Division in December 1918 and the 2nd Division in January 1919. The Scouts Single Infantry Battalion was formed on 21 December 1918.

Eight 'Single Infantry Battalions' were formed on 21 November 1928. The battalions were created to train conscripts during peacetime. In wartime, the battalion would reorganize itself into a regiment with a similar order of battle as the two initial reaction force regiments covering the eastern and southern borders. Each battalion's peacetime strength was a total of 237 soldiers in a regimental staff, a Signal Platoon, an Engineering Platoon, a Ski-Bicycle Platoon, a Building Platoon, and three infantry companies.

The wartime order of battle would have transformed the battalion into a regiment-sized unit with the same unit number. It would have included 3 infantry battalions, Signal Company, Engineering Company, Ski-Bicycle Company, Cavalry Company, Building Company, Commandant Commando, and a CB Commando; all in total of 3,153 men.

The 2nd Single Infantry Battalion was located at Tartu, the 3rd Single Infantry Battalion was located at Valga, the 4th at Jõhvi, the 5th at Rakvere, the 6th Single Infantry Battalion was located at Pärnu, the 8th Single Infantry Battalion at Valga, the 9th at Pärnu, and the 10th Single Infantry Battalion was located at Tallinn.

A reorganisation took place on 1 February 1940 and a fourth division was created. The 4th Division staff was based in Viljandi. The division was made up by the Pärnu-Viljandi Military District and Valga Military District. The division's commander was Colonel Jaan Maide. The four divisions were active until the Soviet occupation of Estonia.

On 17 August 1940, after Estonia was occupied by the Soviets, the 22nd Territorial Rifle Corps of the Red Army was formed at Tallinn. The Army was created as a territorial Estonian body based on military units and institutions of the Estonian army. All soldiers and officers kept the Estonian Army 1936-spec uniforms but with Soviet insignia. The first commander of the 22nd Territorial Rifle Corps was a former major general of the Estonian army, Gustav Jonson, who was later arrested by the NKVD and shot. Most of the corps' officer posts were occupied by former officers of the Estonian Army. By the middle of June 1941, before the German invasion of the Soviet Union; most of the Estonian Army officers were arrested and replaced by newcomers from the Soviet Red Army officers.

Many of the Estonian officers of the 22nd Territorial Rifle Corps body were arrested and died in 1941 and 1942 in camps in the Soviet Union; many were shot. The former commander of the 180th Rifle Division, 22nd Corps, Richard Tomberg, survived after dismissal only because from 1942 He was claimed by the Frunze Military Academy as a teacher. He was arrested in February 1944 (He was later released from the camp and rehabilitated in 1956). Some officers of the 22nd Rifle Corps, among them Alfons Rebane, managed to escape from the authorities in the period between dismissal from the army and the plan for their arrest. Some managed to escape abroad, others came out of hiding only after the arrival of German troops in July and August 1941, some of them volunteered for the Estonian units that fought on the side of Nazi Germany or enlisted in Estonian organisations controlled by the Germans.

The 22nd Territorial Rifle Corps was part of the 'operational army' during World War II from 22 June 1941 to 31 August 1941. On 22 June 1941, the 22nd Territorial Rifle Corps headquarters was stationed in the village of Rev.

== Organization ==
=== Military units ===
==== Fire and maneuver team ====
A fire-and-manoeuvre team (lahingpaar) is a small Estonian military unit led by a soldier that is subordinate to an infantry fireteam. The fire and maneuver team is bigger than an individual soldier but smaller than a fireteam. The fire and maneuver team is the smallest military formation among the Estonian Ground Force infantry units.

The fire and maneuver team usually consists of two soldiers. The more experienced soldier leads a fire and maneuver team in the pair.

One fire and maneuver team is meant to operate on a battlefield along with other fire and maneuver teams on a landscape no greater than 20 x 50 metres. There are no logistical support elements in the structure of a fire and maneuver team.

==== Fireteam ====
A fireteam (pooljagu) is a small military unit led by a senior soldier that is subordinate to an infantry squad. The fireteam is bigger than a fire and maneuver team (lahingpaar) but smaller than a squad (jagu). A fireteam is one of the smallest military formation among the Estonian Ground Force infantry units.

A fireteam usually consists of three to five soldiers, and may be further subdivided into fire and maneuver teams. A fireteam is composed of two fire and maneuver teams of two soldiers each, as well as a fireteam leader (pooljao ülem; in Defence League salgapealik) who is usually a corporal (kapral).

One fireteam is meant to operate on a battlefield along with others on a landscape no greater than 50 x 100 metres. There are no logistical support elements in the structure of a fireteam.

==== Squad ====
A squad (jagu) is a small military unit led by a non-commissioned officer (NCO) that is subordinate to an infantry platoon. A squad is bigger than a fireteam (pooljagu) but smaller than a platoon (rühm). A squad is one of the smallest military formation among the Estonian Ground Force infantry units.

A squad usually consists of six to ten soldiers, and may be further subdivided into fireteams. A squad is composed of two fireteams of five soldiers each, as well as a squad leader (jaoülem; in Defence League jaopealik) who is usually a sergeant (seersant). His second in command is known as an assistant squad leader (jaoülema abi; in Defence League jaopealiku abi).

One squad is meant to operate on a battlefield along with other squads on a landscape no greater than 100 x 200 metres. There are no logistical support elements in the structure of a squad. The formation transport is usually made up by one tactical transport vehicle such as a Mercedes-Benz Unimog 435.

==== Platoon ====
A platoon (rühm) is a small military unit led by a commissioned officer that is subordinate to an infantry company. A platoon is bigger than a squad (jagu) but smaller than a company (kompanii). A platoon is one of the smallest military formations among the Estonian Ground Force infantry units.

A platoon usually consists of thirty to fifty soldiers, and is further subdivided into squads. A platoon is composed of five squads of ten soldiers each, as well as a platoon leader (rühmaülem; in Defence League rühmapealik) who is usually a junior lieutenant (nooremleitnant). His second in command is known as a platoon sergeant (rühmavanem; in Defence League rühmapealiku abi).

One platoon is meant to operate on a battlefield along with other platoons on a landscape no greater than 300 × 400 metres. There is no logistical support element in the structure of a platoon. The formation transport is usually made up by three to five tactical transport vehicles such as a Mercedes-Benz Unimog 435.

==== Company ====
A company (Kompanii) is a medium military unit led by a junior officer that is subordinate to an infantry battalion. A company is bigger than a platoon (rühm) but smaller than a battalion (pataljon). A company is one of the most basic military formation among the Estonian Ground Force infantry units.

A company usually consists of 180 to 250 soldiers, and is further subdivided into platoons. A company is composed of five platoons of thirty to fifty soldiers each, as well as a company leader (kompaniiülem) who is usually a captain (kapten). His second in command is a lieutenant and he/she acts as an assistant of the company commander (kompaniiülema abi).

One company is meant to operate on a battlefield along with other companies, on a landscape no greater than 500 x 500 metres. There is a logistical support element in a company's structure based on a reserve platoon and it is at company level one finds the first integral logistic support within a formation. The formation transport is usually made up by twenty tactical transport vehicles such as a Mercedes-Benz Unimog 435.

==== Battalion ====
A battalion (Pataljon) is a military unit led by a senior officer that is subordinate to an infantry brigade. A battalion consists of several companies (kompanii), with several battalions forming a brigade (brigaad). A battalion is one of the most basic military formations among the Estonian Ground Force infantry units.

A battalion usually consists of 900 to 1,250 soldiers. A battalion is composed of five companies of 180 to 250 soldiers each, the majority of the companies being infantry, with one or two companies providing logistical and special weapons support. The commander is usually a lieutenant colonel (kolonelleitnant). His second in command is a major and acts as a deputy to the battalion commander (pataljoni staabiülem).

One battalion is meant to operate on a battlefield landscape no greater than 1,500 x 3,000 metres. There is a logistical support element in a battalion's structure based on a reserve company. The formation transport is usually made up of tactical transport vehicles such as the Mercedes-Benz Unimog 435, the number assigned varying according to roles assigned.

==== Regional unit ====
Above battalion, a regional unit (malev) is a county milita led by a senior officer that is subordinate to an infantry division; the formation functions similar to how a brigade in many western armies functions. The term malev is historical. It was originally based on the manpower of a county and was led by a county leader (vanem). A malev was bigger than a battalion (pataljon) and smaller than a division (diviis). A malev was the largest military formation among the Estonian Defense League infantry units.

A malev is usually a sub-component of a division, a larger unit consisting of two or more malevs; however, some brigades are classified as a separate brigade and operate independently from the traditional division structure.

A modern malev is typically composed of three to five companies or battalions, depending on the area and available manpower of a given county. Each malev can operate independently on a battlefield encompassing an area of 10 km × 15 km. A malev's commanding officer is commonly a colonel, but shortage of personnel and/or resources may see some malev's commanded by majors.

==== Division ====
A division (diviis) is a large military unit led by a general that is subordinate to a corps (korpus). The division is bigger than a brigade (brigaad) but smaller than a corps.

A division usually consists of 20,000 to 35,000 soldiers, and is further subdivided into brigades. A division is composed of two to four brigades 5,000 to 8,750 soldiers each, as well as a division leader (diviisiiülem) who is usually a major general (kindralmajor). His second in command is a brigadier general (brigaadikindral) as an assistant of the division (diviisiülema abi).

One division is meant to operate on a battlefield along with other divisions on a front which covers more than two counties. There is a logistical support element in a division's structure based on a reserve brigade. The formation transport is usually made up by 5,000 to 7,000 tactical transport vehicles such as a Mercedes-Benz Unimog 435.

=== Peacetime organization ===
Estonian military units and bases
Source: Jane's World Armies Issue 23 – 2008
Tapa Garrison: is also for the HQ Northeastern Defense District and fields the 1st Artillery, Air Defense, and Engineer Battalions.
Note 2: Tallinn is HQ Northern Defense District, HQ Estonian Navy, and garrison for the Guard Battalion.

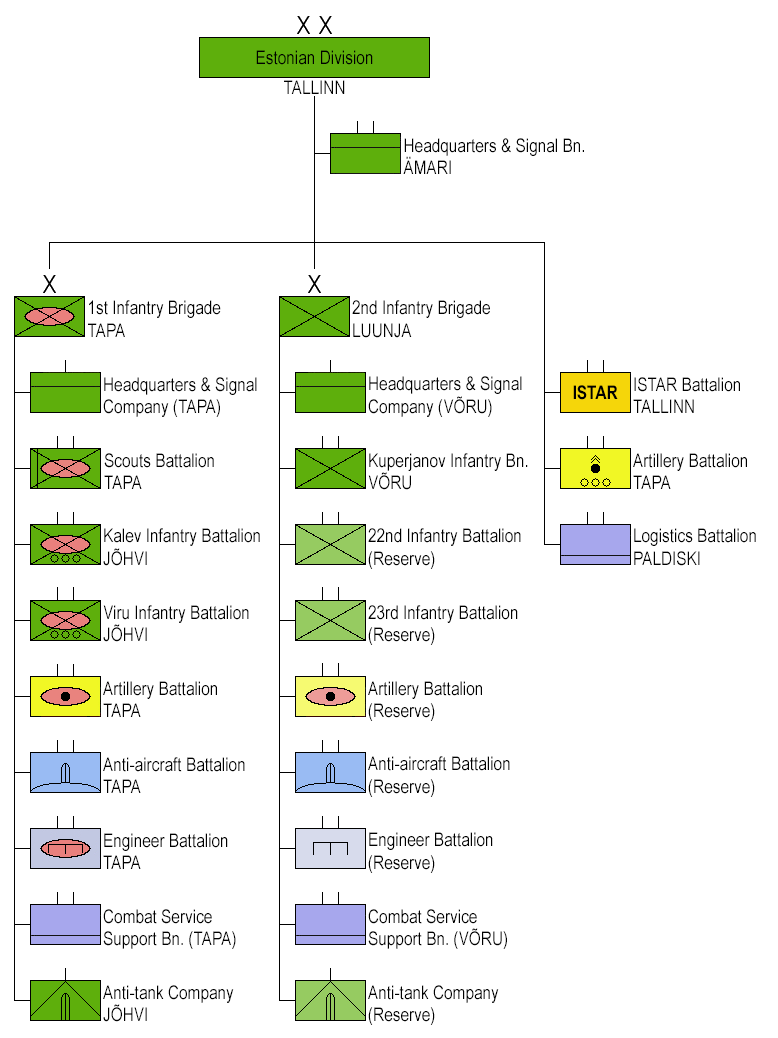
Estonian Division organization as of April 2026

The two brigades are not fully manned in peacetime. The only units fully manned at all times are the two brigade commands, the Scouts Battalion and the EOD/Demining Service. The 2nd Infantry Brigade was activated on 1 August 2014. The brigade will continue to activate further units to reach full strength by 2022 at the latest. The 1st Infantry Brigade will become a mechanized brigade with tracked infantry fighting vehicles and self-propelled artillery. In wartime, the two brigades will be brought to full strength with reserve soldiers. Besides the two Land Force brigades, the Estonian Defense Forces also field a large number of smaller light infantry units of the Estonian Defense League, which are tasked with local defense; respectively stay-behind operations.

- Estonian Division, in Tallinn
  - Headquarters and Signal Battalion, in Tallinn
  - Artillery Regiment, in Tapa
  - ISTAR Battalion, in Tallinn
  - Logistics Battalion, in Paldiski
  - 101st Self Propelled Artillery Battalion (Reserve)
  - 102nd Self Propelled Artillery Battalion (Reserve)
  - SHORAD Battery (Reserve)
  - 1st Infantry Brigade, in Tapa
    - Headquarters and Signal Company, in Tapa
    - Scouts Battalion, in Tapa, professional rapid reaction unit armed with CV-90s
    - Kalev Infantry Battalion, in Jõhvi
    - Viru Infantry Battalion, in Jõhvi
    - Air Defense Battalion, in Tapa
    - Engineer Battalion, in Tapa
    - Combat Service Support Battalion, in Tapa
    - Anti-Tank Company, in Jõhvi
    - Armour School, in Tapa
  - 2nd Infantry Brigade, in Luunja
    - Headquarters and Signal Company, in Võru
    - Kuperjanov Infantry Battalion, in Võru
    - Combat Service Support Battalion, in Võru
    - 2nd Kuperjanov Infantry Battalion
    - 3rd Kuperjanov Infantry Battalion
    - 22nd Infantry Battalion (Reserve)
    - 23rd Infantry Battalion (Reserve)
    - Air Defense Battalion (Reserve)
    - Engineer Battalion (Reserve)
    - Anti-Tank Company (Reserve)
    - UAS Company

== Personnel ==
As of 2025, Land Forces have around ~3500 active-duty soldiers and roughly ~30,000 reserve soldiers.

=== Training ===
Estonian Land Forces organizes Spring Storm (Kevadtorm) exercises every other year. 9,000 soldiers participated in the exercise in 2017. Between Spring Storm's there is also Hedgehog (Siil). In 2025, over 16,000 EDF and allied soldiers participated in the exercise.

=== Ranks ===
NATO code	OF-10	OF-9	OF-8	OF-7	OF-6	OF-5	OF-4	OF-3	OF-2	OF-1
Estonian Land Forces
Estonian Land Forces		Kindral	Kindralleitnant	Kindralmajor	Brigaadikindral	Kolonel	Kolonelleitnant	Major	Kapten	Leitnant	Nooremleitnant	Lipnik
Estonian: Lühend		kin	kin-ltn	kin-mjr	brig-kin	kol	kol-ltn	mjr	kpt	ltn	n-ltn	lpn
English: Ranks		General	Lieutenant General	Major General	Brigadier General	Colonel	Lieutenant Colonel	Major	Captain	First Lieutenant	Second Lieutenant	Ensign
English: Abbreviation		GEN	LTG	MG	BG	COL	LTC	MAJ	CPT	1LT	2LT	ENS

NATO code	OR-9		OR-8	OR-7	OR-6	OR-5	OR-4		OR-3	OR-2	OR-1
Estonian Land Forces
Estonian Land Forces	Ülemveebel	Staabiveebel	Vanemveebel	Veebel	Nooremveebel	Vanemseersant	Seersant	Nooremseersant		Kapral	Reamees
Estonian: Lühend	ü-vbl	st-vbl	v-vbl	vbl	n-vbl	v-srs	srs	n-srs		kpr	rms
Ranks	Sergeant Major of Land Forces	Sergeant Major	Master Sergeant	Sergeant First Class	Staff Sergeant	Sergeant	Sergeant	Sergeant		Corporal	Private
English: Abbreviation	SMLF	CSM (Note: Command sergeant major is the most senior enlisted member of a color-bearing Land Forces unit and is considered a temporary distinguishing title. A command sergeant major reverts to sergeant major upon leaving assignment.)/SGM	1SG (Note: First sergeant is senior enlisted member of a company and is considered a temporary distinguishing title. A first sergeant reverts to master sergeant upon leaving assignment.)/MSG	SFC	SSG	SGT	SGT	SGT		CPL	PVT

== Equipment ==
=== Weapons ===
Although the defense force employs various individual weapons to provide light firepower at short ranges, the standard weapons used by the ground force are the 5.56x45mm LMT R-20 Rahe, domestically upgraded variants of the 7.62 mm (0.300 in) Automatkarbin 4 and 5.56 mm (0.219 in) Galil-AR assault rifles. Galil & AK4 were switched out for LMT R-20 Rahe, as well as the 9 mm (0.35 in) variant of the MP5 submachine gun for special operations force, Cyber Command, Military Police and some Air Force units. The primary sidearm is the 9x19mm USP semi-automatic pistol. Machine gunners are armed with a variety of specialized weapons, including the MG 3, Negev NG7 and Ksp 58 light machine guns, to provide suppressive fire at the fire-team level. Indirect fire is provided by the and Carl Gustav M2, M3 & M4 Recoilless rifle anti-tank/anti-personnel launchers. The 18.53 mm (0.730 in) Benelli-M3T dual-mode shotgun is used for door breaching and close-quarters combat. A 7.62x51 LMT R-20-L marksman rifle is used by marksmen and snipers, along with the 8.6 mm (0.34 in) Sako TRG and the 12.7 mm (0.50 in) Hecate II heavy sniper rifles used by snipers. Hand grenades, fragmentation and smoke grenades along with the grenade launcher systems, such as the HK-GLM and HK-79N, are used.

The defense force also employs various crew-served weapons to provide medium and heavy firepower at ranges exceeding that of individual weapons. The 12.7mm Browning M2HB heavy machine gun is generally used as a vehicle-mounted machine gun used on Patria Pasi XA180EST and XA188EST armoured personnel carriers. The ground force uses two types of mortar for indirect fire support when heavier artillery may not be appropriate or available. The smallest of these are the 81 mm (3.2 in) M252, B455, and L16A1 mortars that normally assigned at the infantry company level. At higher echelon, infantry battalions are supported by a section of 120 mm (4.7 in) M-41D and 2B11 mortars, which are usually employed by motorized units. Fire support for infantry units is mainly provided by towed howitzers, including the lighter 122 mm (4.8 in) D-30H63 and heavier 155 mm (6.1 in) FH-70 field howitzers. Estonian Defence Forces (Artillery Battalion) have also recently (2025) acquired CAESAR self-propelled howitzers to supplement their K9 Thunder self-propelled artillery pieces. In 2023, Estonia announced that it would donate all its towed artillery pieces to Ukraine. Estonia gave Ukraine 36 122mm D-30s and 24 155mm FH-70s.

The ground force uses a variety of shoulder fired missiles, recoilless rifles, and anti-tank guided missiles to provide infantry and mechanized units with an anti-armor capability. The 82 mm (3.2 in) B-300 is a reusable man-portable anti-tank shoulder-fired missile system (Mainly used by Estonian Defence League). The 84 mm (3.3 in) AT4 is an unguided projectile that can destroy armor and bunkers at ranges up to 500 metres (1,600 feet). The 90 mm (3.5 in) C90-CR is a disposable, shoulder-fired, and one-man operated grenade launcher. Some motorized units are supported by Pvpj 1110 and M40-A1 recoilless rifles that are mounted on high-mobility utility vehicles. The 115 mm (4.5 in) MILAN-2 with the night-firing ability and 148 mm (5.8 in) MAPATS laser-beam riding anti-tank guided missiles are the ground forces' main anti-tank weapon systems. The purchase of the 127 mm (5.0 in) FGM-148 Javelin fire-and-forget anti-tank missiles increased the ground forces' anti-armor units capabilities. The 90mm Mistral is an infrared homing surface-to-air missile, which along with the 23 mm (0.91 in) ZU-23-2 twin-barreled anti-aircraft cannons mounted on trucks make up the backbone of the defense forces' air defense.

=== Vehicles ===
The ground force does not operate any main battle tanks, although some types were in service of the ground force till the Soviet occupation in 1940. The Estonian Ministry of Defence has indicated a need to obtain main battle tanks by 2020 according to the national defense development plan. This idea did not go through. As of 2014, the infantry fighting vehicle CV9035EE is the ground force's main Infantry fighting vehicle, it is fitted with a 35 mm (1.4 in) autocannon turret and a KSP58 General-purpose machine gun, and carries up to 8 fully equipped soldiers. The ground forces' most common armored vehicles are the Pasi series armored personnel carriers of which some have been fitted into ambulance and command post vehicles roles. The similar Pasi XA180EST and Pasi XA188EST armored personnel carriers are the standard troop carrier vehicles of the ground forces 1st Infantry Brigade. The Pasi XA-180's, which were acquired first, have been used by the defense forces' expeditionary units on peacekeeping operations in Central Asia and Africa. In 2025 the final batch of 130 Otokar Arma 6X6 APC's and 100 Makina NMS 4X4 Infantry mobility vehicles were delivered to 2nd Infantry Brigade.

The Estonian Ministry of Defence has signed contracts for the procurement of 36 K9 Thunder self-propelled howitzers from South Korea, 18 of which had been delivered by December 2022. As of May 2025, all 36 K9's have been delivered and integrated into Artillery Battalion of 1st Infantry Brigade. In response to the Russian invasion of Ukraine, Estonia signed a contract with the United States for the procurement of 6 HIMARS multiple launch rocket systems, which were delivered in early 2025. 12 CAESAR self-propelled howitzers, purchased from France, were also delivered in early 2025. While the ground force do not have any utility helicopters, attack helicopters or aircraft of its own, the ground force does operate several types of unmanned aerial vehicles and rotorcrafts. There are no operational armed drones in service of the ground force. In 2014, the Estonian Ministry of Defence announced that Estonia, along with 12 other NATO members, plans to purchase Global Hawk drones to increase its military reconnaissance capabilities. This did not go through.

The defense forces' most common utility and logistics vehicles are the Unimog and DAF series general-purpose trucks and light utility vehicles such as the Unimog 416, Unimog 435, DAF YA4440, and MB 250GD. There are varieties of different MAN and Sisu built military logistics vehicles, such as the MAN 4520, 4620, 4640, KAT1, and Sisu E13TP, in use of the ground force, which are capable of serving as a cargo/troop carrier, artillery tractors, weapons platform and ambulance, among other roles.

=== Uniforms ===
The M06 ESTDCU, is the Estonian version of the digital camouflage uniform and its various patterns are designed for use in woodland, desert, urban, and winter warfare environments. Soldiers of Estonian Land Force get the PASGT combat helmet, a ballistic vest, and a night vision device.
