= Alice Kuperjanov =

Estonian independence fighter (1894–1942)

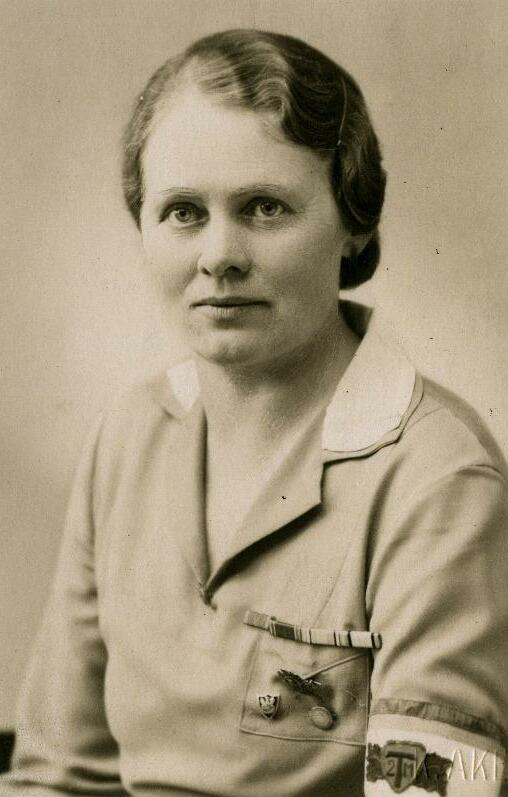
- Born: Alice Johanson; 5 November 1894; Aru Parish, Tartu County, Governorate of Livonia, Russian Empire
- Died: 17 July 1942 (aged 47); Sosva, Sverdlovsk Oblast, Russian SFSR, Soviet Union
- Citizenship: Estonian
- Occupations: Independence fighter; leader of women's organisations
- Spouse: Julius Kuperjanov (m. 1918; died 1919)

Alice Kuperjanov (née Alice Johanson; 5 November 1894 – 17 July 1942) was an Estonian freedom fighter and nationalist, and the wife of Estonian military leader Julius Kuperjanov. She was a well-known figure in the 1918–1920 Estonian War of Independence, and in women's movements after that. After the 1940 Soviet invasion and occupation of Estonia during World War II, she was imprisoned, deported and executed by the Soviet authorities.

== Early life ==
Alice Kuperjanov was born as Alice Johanson on 5 November 1894, in Aru Parish (now part of Elva Parish, Tartu county) in southeast Estonia. She went to school in Vana-Kuuste, a year behind her future husband. After graduating, she entered the girls' senior high school of the Estonian Youth Education Society. After leaving school she worked as an accountant in Saint Petersburg. She married Julius Kuperjanov in Kambja on 26 February 1918.

== War of Independence ==
In 1918, when the German army had occupied Estonia during World War I, Julius Kuperjanov's apartment in Tartu was the centre of underground activities where the Estonian Defence League was first organised. One of Alice's responsibilities was to hide secret documents; another was to monitor German activities to ensure the soldiers would not plunder Estonian property, it being easier for women than for men to move around without suspicion. After the German withdrawal from Estonia, following capitulation of Germany in World War I in November 1918, the power was transferred to the Estonian Provisional Government. A few weeks later, the Russian Bolshevik Red Army invaded Estonia, which led to a defensive campaign by the newly formed Estonian armed forces. This conflict, known as the Estonian War of Independence, resulted in victory for Estonia, concluded by the 1920 Treaty of Tartu.

At the beginning of the War of Independence, Julius Kuperjanov was appointed commander of the Tartu County Defence League and the Kuperjanovs withdrew from Tartu to the nearby Puurmani manor, where the Kuperjanov Partisan Battalion was founded. Alice Kuperjanov initially assisted in underground work and later in direct military activities, fed the fighters from the manor's farm, and managed their clothing needs and first aid. Julius Kuperjanov was mortally wounded by enemy fire at the Battle of Paju on 31 January 1919. Alice never remarried. Julius Kuperjanov's tomb became a symbol of anti-Soviet resistance during the USSR's occupation of Estonia (1944–1991).

== In independent Estonia ==
In 1925, a women's group aimed at involving women in national defence and the development of society, a predecessor of the Women's Home Protection (NKK), was established in Tartu. Kuperjanov was one of its founders and became the deputy chairwoman. Her work, along with that of many other women of the time, is credited with the founding of the Estonian women's movement. In 1932, she became chairwoman of the Women's Home Protection Division II, a position she held until her death. She was also active at the national level, serving as secretary of the organisation. In 1938, she taught catering classes at the Tondi Battle School, which were attended by 147 women.

In addition to her work with the NKK, Kuperjanov served on the board of the Lasteabi ("Children's Aid") Society, which organised catering for 200 needy children as well as the collection and distribution of clothes for poorer families in Tartu. She was also one of the founders of the Tartu Housewives' Society and an organiser of the Tartu Institute of Home Education. Politically, she was a member of Jaan Tõnisson's National Centre Party. She was a member of the party's Tartu County Committee and chairwoman of its women's section, and in 1932 was a member of the Tartu City Council. In 1937 she sold her 25-hectare (62-acre) farm inherited from her husband and built a house in Tartu.

== Imprisonment and death ==
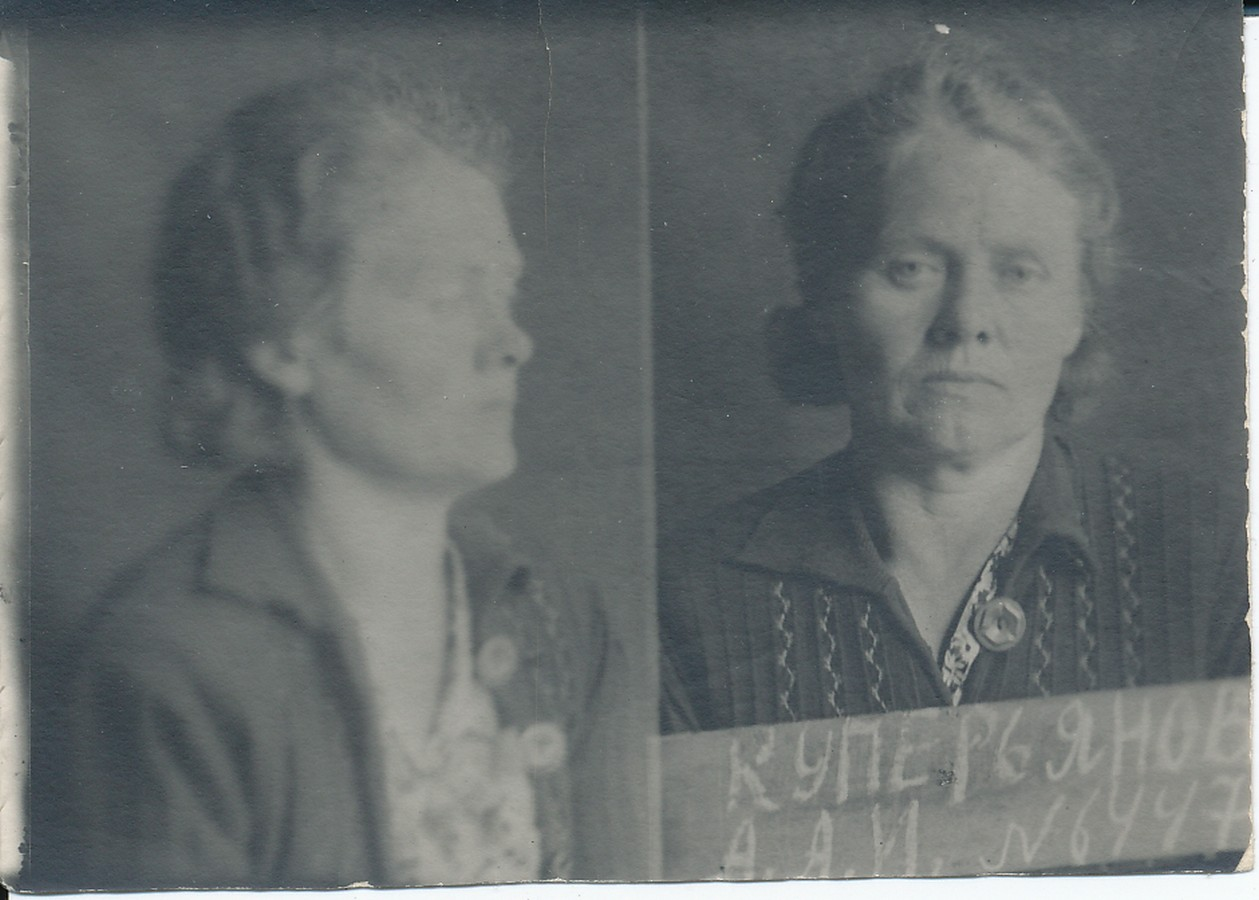
NKVD photograph of Kuperjanov following her arrest, c. 1941

After the 1940 Soviet invasion and occupation of Estonia during World War II, Kuperjanov, like all other leaders of Estonian political organisations, came to the immediate attention of the Stalinist regime's secret police, the NKVD. On 14 June 1941, she was arrested at her home, and a few weeks later deported to a Soviet prison camp in the Ural Mountains in Sosva, Sverdlovsk Oblast. She was accused of belonging to the "counter-revolutionary" Defence League in 1925–1940 and of having been the wife of a "White partisan commander" fighting against the Soviet Red Army in 1918–1919. She was sentenced to death by shooting and confiscation of all property. Alice Kuperjanov was executed on 17 July 1942.

== Publications ==
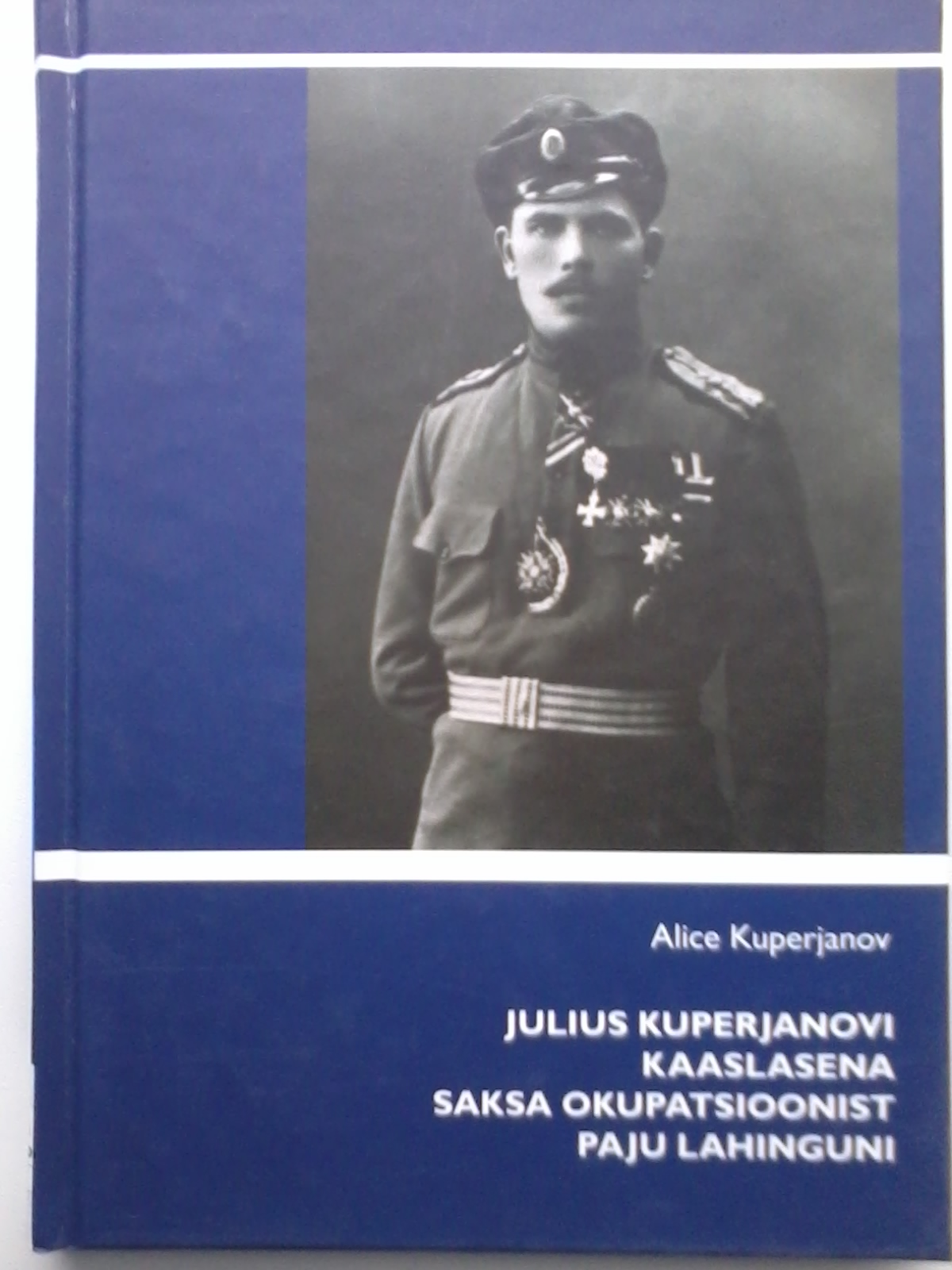
Cover of book written by Kuperjanov about her husband

In 1937, Kuperjanov published a memoir of her time with her husband, entitled Julius Kuperjanovi kaaslasena Saksa okupatsioonist Paju lahinguni (English: Julius Kuperjanov's Companion from the German Occupation to the Battle of Paju.)
