= Kuperjanov =

Estonian family name

Kuperjanov is an Estonian surname, see "Julius Kuperjanov" for its origin from the surname Kupper. Notable people with the surname include:

- Alice Kuperjanov (1894–1942), Estonian freedom fighter and nationalist
- Julius Kuperjanov (1894–1919), Estonian military officer

== See also ==
- Kupriyanov
