= Johannes Soodla =

Estonian military personnel

- Born: 14 January 1897; Kudina Parish, Estonia, Russian Empire
- Died: 16 May 1965 (aged 68); Goslar, West Germany
- Military career
- Allegiance: Russian Empire; Estonia; Nazi Germany
- Branch: Imperial Russian Army; Estonian Army; Wehrmacht; Waffen-SS
- Service years: 1916-1917 (Russia); 1918–1941 (Estonia); 1942–1944 (Germany)
- Rank: Brigadeführer
- Units: Kuperjanov's Battalion; 20th Waffen Grenadier Division of the SS (1st Estonian)
- Conflicts: World War I; Estonian War of Independence; Battle of Paju; World War II
- Awards: Order of St. George 4th class Cross of Liberty (Estonia); Order of the Cross of the Eagle; Iron Cross 2nd class

Johannes Soodla (14 January 1897 in Kudina Parish, (now in Palamuse Parish) – 16 May 1965) was an Estonian military officer during World War I, Estonian War of Independence and World War II, serving in Kuperjanov's Partisan Battalion and the 20th Waffen Grenadier Division of the SS (1st Estonian). In 1944 he was promoted to Brigadeführer, which was the highest rank ascribed to any Estonian officer in the German army during World War II.

In 1916 Soodla was mobilized in the Russian Army and was sent to a military school in Gatchina. He fought in World War I. In the Estonian War of Independence Soodla fought along with Julius Kuperjanov in the same unit. Soodla was a company commander. He fought in all the toughest battles in the war including the Battle of Paju where he took command of the battalion after Kuperjanov was wounded. After the war, the Estonian Cross of Liberty was awarded to Soodla. From 1920 to 1940 he served in the Estonian Army until released by Soviet Army in 1941.

Soodla then went to Germany returning to Estonia in the summer of same year with German Army. Soodla headed both the Estonian police and Omakaitse, a paramilitary self-defence organization during the German occupation. He was promoted to Oberfuhrer and then Brigadefuhrer. In 1943 he joined the Estonian Legion and was Inspector-General of the Estonian units in German forces. In 1944 he fell back with German forces to Germany.

He was known to have been in post-war refugee camps in Germany. He later lived in Italy and in United States. He died on May 16, 1965, in Goslar, Germany.

The Estonian International Commission for the Investigation of Crimes Against Humanity concluded that by the virtue of his senior position, Johannes Soodla shared responsibility with the German authorities for all criminal actions carried out in Estonia, and beyond its borders by military units or police battalions raised with their consent.
