= Artillery Battalion =

Artillery Battalion may refer to the following military units:

- Artillery Battalion (Belgium)
- Artillery Battalion, 1st Infantry Brigade (Estonia)
- 25th Artillery Battalion (Estonia)
- General Romualdas Giedraitis Artillery Battalion, Lithuania
- Artillery Battalion (Norway)

== See also ==
- Artillery
- Battalion
