= Oinas =

Family name

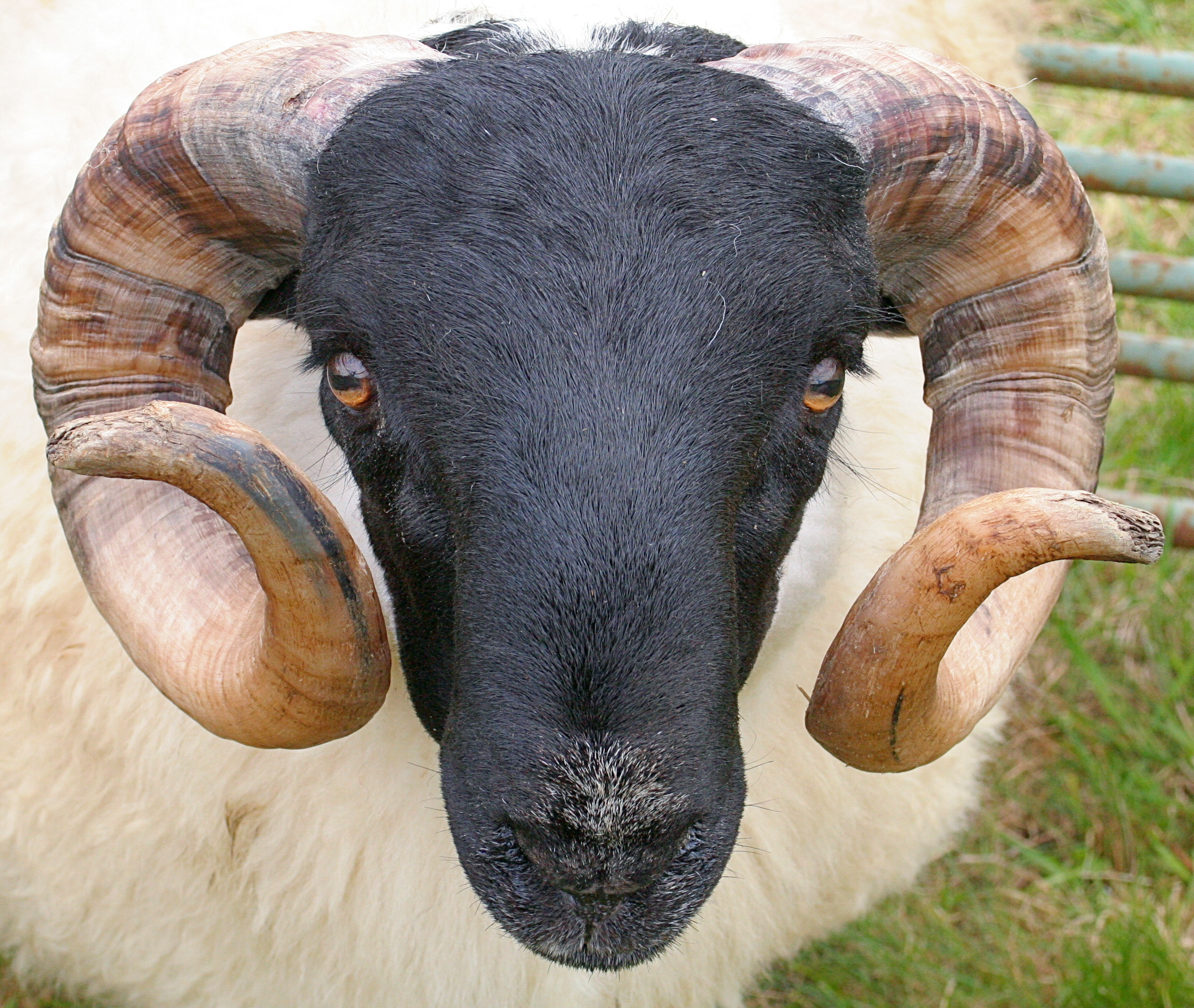

Origin
- Languages: Estonian, Finnish
- Meaning: ram, wether (Ovis aries)
- Region of origin: Baltic-Finnic linguistic area

Oinas is an Estonian and Finnish surname meaning "ram" or "wether" (Ovis aries).

Notable people bearing the surname Oinas include:

- Aleksander Oinas (1887–1942), Estonian politician
- Alma Ostra-Oinas (1886–1960), Estonian journalist, writer and politician
- Asko Oinas (1929–2020), Finnish government official and Governor of Lapland
- August Oinas (1898–1965), Estonian historian
- Felix Oinas (1911–2004), Estonian folklorist, linguist, scholar and translator
- Teuvo Oinas (born 1954), Finnish singer
- Valdar Oinas (born 1942), Estonian astrophysicist
