= Combat Service Support Battalion, 2nd Infantry Brigade (Estonia) =

Estonian military unit

Combat Service Support Battalion
- Lahinguteeninduspataljon
- Insignia of the CSS Battalion
- Active: 1 August 2014 – present
- Country: Estonia
- Branch: Estonian Land Forces
- Type: Combat service support
- Role: Supporting units of 2nd Infantry brigade
- Size: Battalion
- Part of: 2nd Infantry Brigade
- Garrison/HQ: Taara Army Base

Commanders
- Current commander: Lieutenant colonel Janek Rannamägi

The Combat Service Support Battalion (Estonian: Lahinguteeninduspataljon) of the 2nd Infantry Brigade is a battalion size regular military unit of the Estonian Land Forces with combat service support role. The CCS Battalion is located in South Eastern Estonia and provides rear support including medical service for the units of the Brigade and Võru Battle School.

== History ==
The CSS Battalion was created along with the formation of 2nd Infantry Brigade and reorganization of Southern Defence District in 2014. That was a part of the Military reform of the Estonian Defence Forces in order to create two maneuverable brigade size units instead of four static defence districts.

== Organisation ==
The structure of the CSS Battalion includes:

- Headquarters
- Supply Group
- Repair Team
- Transport Group
- Medical Centre

After mobilization team and groups would expand to companies. It is important to notice that there are no conscripts in this Battalion in peacetime.

=== Garrison ===
The CSS Battalion is located in Taara Army Base, Võru town along with Kuperjanov Infantry Battalion and Võru NCO school.

== See also ==
- 2nd Infantry Brigade of Estonian Land Forces
- CSS Battalion of the 1st Infantry Brigade
- Logistics Battalion of the Estonian Division
