= 2nd Infantry Brigade (Estonia) =

Estonian military unit

- 2. jalaväebrigaad
- Insignia of the 2nd Infantry Brigade
- Active: 2014–present
- Country: Estonia
- Branch: Estonian Land Forces
- Type: Infantry
- Size: Brigade
- Part of: Estonian Division
- Garrison/HQ: Sirgu, Luunja Parish; Taara Army Base
- Motto: "Tehtud teisest terasest" ("Made of other steel")
- Colors: black and white

Commanders
- Current commander: Colonel Antti Viljaste

Insignia
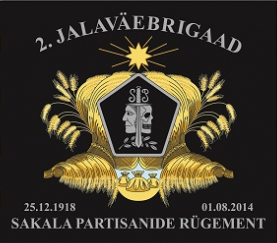
- Flag

The 2nd Infantry Brigade (Estonian: 2. jalaväebrigaad) is an infantry brigade of the Estonian Land Forces. It is the primary military unit in Southern Estonia. The brigade headquarters is currently based at Sirgu village, Luunja Parish, Tartu County. The brigade is tasked with planning and organizing military operations, planning and organizing mobilization, ensuring the readiness and support of its subordinate units, preparing wartime reserve units and their formation, organizing the training and participation in international military operations.

== History ==
The 2nd Infantry Brigade follows in the tradition of the Sakala Partisan Regiment, which was formed on December 25, 1918. The unit was initially named the Sakala Partisan Battalion. It was manned by volunteers and based out of Tartu. In 1919, it became a regiment. The unit received its flag on December 31, 1919. The regiment fought numerous battles on the southern front in the Estonian War of Independence, under Petseri, Võru, Tartu and Viljandi. After the war, the unit became a reserve infantry regiment.

On August 1, 2014, the Southern Defence District was reorganized into the 2nd Infantry Brigade. On September 9, 2015, lieutenant colonel Eero Rebo replaced lieutenant colonel Enno Mõts as the brigades commander. Enno Mõts had been the commander of the unit since 2014. On April 19, 2016, the 2nd Infantry Brigade received the flag of the former Sakala Partisan Regiment. Current commander of the 2nd Infantry Brigade is Lieutenant colonel Antti Viljaste (since December 2024).

== Structure ==
The current peacetime structure of the 2nd Infantry Brigade consists of headquarters, Kuperjanov Infantry Battalion, Combat Service Support Battalion and HQ and Signal Company. The headquarters is led by a chief of staff, who is directly subordinate to the brigade commander. The headquarters consists of a personnel section (S1), intelligence and security section (S2), operations and training section (S3/7), logistics section (S4), signals section (S6) and finance section (S8). It is tasked with providing the brigade commander with necessary information for planning and analysing brigade's training, activities and operations, planning and preparing mobilization, maintaining combat readiness and coordinating activities with other units of the Estonian Defence Forces, as well as organizing civil-military co-operation. The brigade is preparing reserve units through training of conscripts, which allows the formation of wartime and reserve units. The combat service support battalion is tasked with providing administrative and logistics support for training, plus preparing and executing the formation of wartime and reserve units. The battalion commanders are directly subordinate to the brigade commander.

=== Peacetime structure ===
- Brigade Headquarters (Luunja Parish)
- HQ Support and Signal Company (Taara Army Base, Võru)
- Kuperjanov Infantry Battalion (Taara Army Base, Võru)
- Combat Service Support Battalion (Taara Army Base, Võru)

=== Wartime structure ===
The 2nd Infantry Brigade will continue to activate further units to reach full strength by 2022 at the latest and in the end will consist of the following units.

- Brigade Headquarters
- HQ and Signal Company
- 21st Infantry Battalion
- 22nd Infantry Battalion (reserve)
- 23rd Infantry Battalion (reserve)
- Artillery Battalion (reserve)
- Air Defence Battalion (reserve)
- Engineer Battalion (reserve)
- Combat Service Support Battalion
- Anti-Tank Company (reserve)

== See also ==
- Estonian Land Forces
- 1st Infantry Brigade
- Taara Army Base
