= Jüri Pertmann =

Estonian freedom fighter (1938–2019)

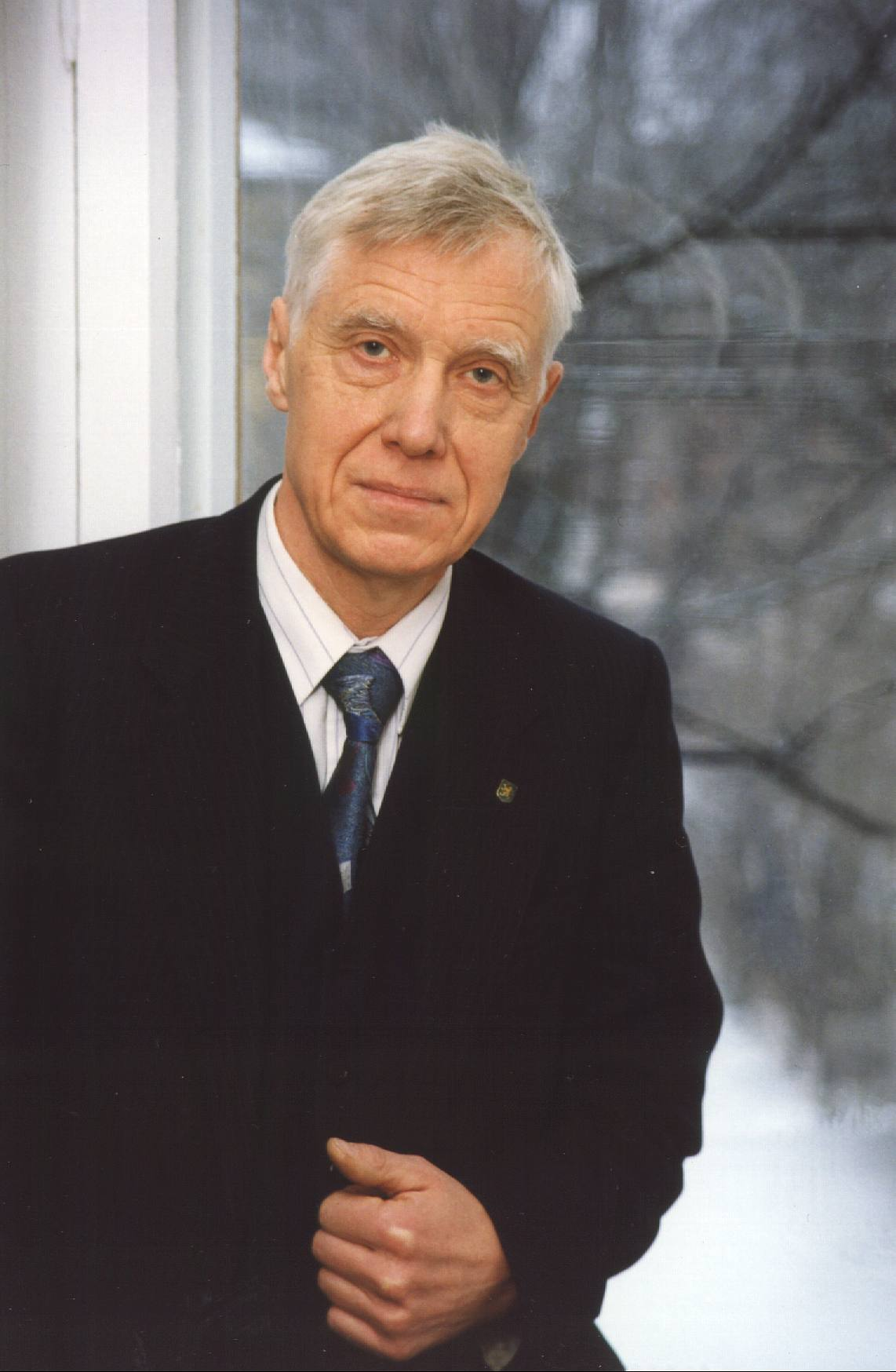
- Jüri Pertmann in 1990
- Born: 13 July 1938; Tartu, Estonia
- Died: 11 July 2019 (aged 80); Meeri, Tartu County, Estonia
- Known for: Pro-independence activism during the Soviet occupation

Jüri Pertmann (13 July 1938 – 11 July 2019) was an Estonian anti-Soviet dissident, independence activist, psychologist and civil servant. He was chairman of the Memento Union. After Estonia had restored independence in 1991, he served as head of the Tartu County branch of the Estonian Citizenship and Migration Board in 1994–2004.

== Resistance to Soviet occupation ==
In March 1954, Pertmann, aged 15, and some of his friends founded the Kuperjanovlased, an underground resistance movement, in Tartu. Its aim was to free Estonia from the Soviet occupation. Other members of the Kuperjanovlased included Eino Neerot, Tõnu Raid and Kaarel Tuvike. Among other activities, in February 1955, a few days prior to the Estonian Independence Day 24 February (1918), the Kuperjanovlased distributed almost 1,000 leaflets in Tartu calling for resistance. The Soviet KGB failed to identify any individual members of the Kuperjanovlased, and the organization thus escaped any repressions.

On 11 November 1957, Jüri Pertmann was arrested by the Soviet border guards in the vicinity of Gvardeiskaya railway station near the Soviet-Finnish international boundary, during his unsuccessful attempt to escape the USSR and seek refuge in Finland.

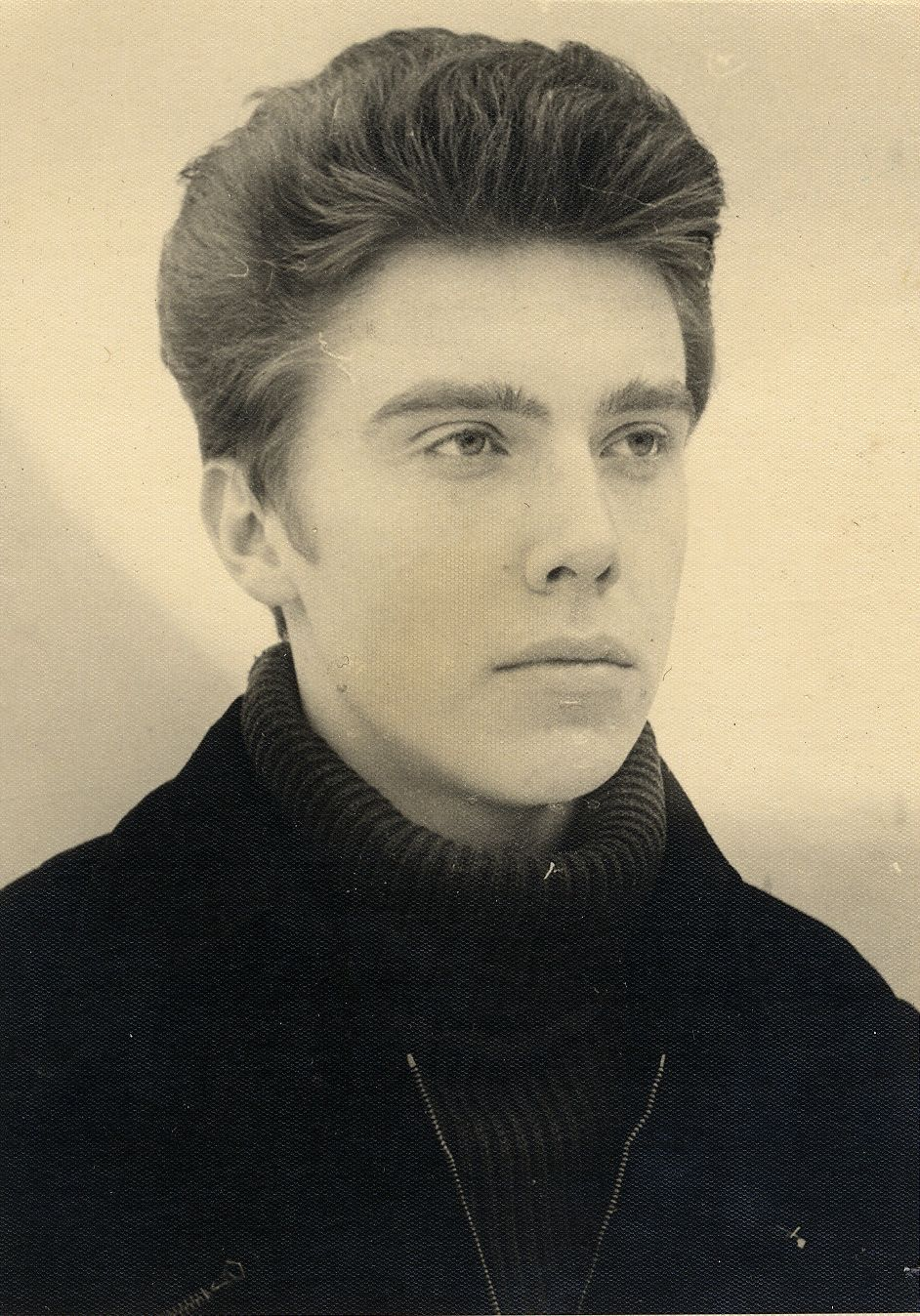
Jüri Pertmann in 1963.

Pertmann was jailed in Vyborg and Leningrad prisons for a short time and in Patarei prison in Tallinn. By a decision of 28 January 1958, the Supreme Court of the Estonian SSR convicted him of attempting to cross the state border illegally and of anti-Soviet propaganda (as a copy of a blacklisted book "Year of Suffering of the Estonian People, 1940–1941" had been found on him during arrest). Pertmann's activities in the Kuperjanovlased remained unknown to the Soviet authorities. In the spring of 1958, Pertmann was transferred to Sosnovka Labor Camp No. 7 in Mordovia, where he stayed in various prison camps, participating in the activities of the Estonian Youth Malev and the Estonian Union of New Ethnic Underworld organizations, among others. From then on, Pertmann was under KGB surveillance until 1988, but continued to communicate with Estonian nationalists and dissidents. Jaan Isotamm was a close friend. He participated in the distribution of samizdat (underground self-published tracts). In 1968, 1973, 1978, 1983 and 1988, on the anniversaries of his release from the prison camp, he organized gatherings in the country house in Meeri to spread anti-Soviet and anti-occupation ideas.

At the end of the 1970s, on the initiative of Lithuanian dissident Viktoras Petkus, an attempt was made to create an organization uniting the Estonian, Latvian and Lithuanian resistance movements. Among others, Pertmann participated on behalf of Estonia. However, the discussions failed and no organization was formed.

During the 1980–1981 events in Soviet-controlled Poland, Pertmann wrote a public letter in support of Solidarity, the Polish independent trade union.

Between 1979 and 1984, Pertmann compiled and published an underground almanac, Sotsioloogilised Vihikud (Sociological Booklets), in which he sought to open up and explain historical ideas in Estonia, the Soviet Union, and elsewhere in the world in political, social, and economic terms. However, the almanac reproduced as photocopies reached only a few readers.

Pertmann was one of the 20 signatories of the "Message from Tartu to the Congress of Estonia - Proposal to Restore the Republic of Estonia", which was published in the newspaper Edasi on February 14, 1990. Over the following 25 years, he ran unsuccessfully for multiple positions:, in 1990, for the Estonian Supreme Soviet on the list of the Memento Common Platform in Tallinn; in 1992, for the Riigikogu in Põlva, Valga and Võru County lists of the Estonian National Independence Party; in 1999, for the Riigikogu on the list of Moderates in Tartu County; and in 2013, for the Nõo Parish council in the list of NÕO.EU.

=== Education ===
In 1953, Jüri Pertmann graduated from Tartu II Secondary School. From 1953 to 1956, he studied at Tartu Construction Technical School. In the spring of 1959, while deported as political prisoner, he was able to graduate from a Russian language evening high school at the Sosnovka Labour Camp No. 7, a Gulag prison camp in the Mordovian ASSR, then Soviet Russia. As it was not allowed to enter a university in Estonia with a high school diploma obtained in Mordovia, he had to re-graduate again, this time from an Estonian language evening high school in 1970 in Elva. At first try, in 1970, he was not admitted to university for "political reasons". However, in June 1975, Pertmann was able to complete his studies and graduated from the Faculty of History of the University of Tartu with a degree in psychology and studied management psychology at the same university in 1978–1981. He also completed the management preparatory courses by the Ministry of Light Industry of the Estonian SSR and became a certified production manager.

=== Professional career ===
- 1956–1957 Construction worker in Tartu
- 1958–1963 Sawmill worker in various prison camps in Mordovia, blacksmith, tailor and brick factory worker
- 1964–1975 EKE system technician, senior technician, civil engineer, designer
- 1975–1981 social psychologist and psychologist in the EKE system
- 1975–1990 Adviser to the Chairman of Tartu KEK on social psychology and information work
- 1982–1990 Leading specialist in sociological research, analysis of the company's activities, personnel reserve and evaluation in the management laboratory of EKE
- 1991–1992 Sociologist at the development and training company EKE Ariko
- 1993-1994 Senior special reporter of the Ministry of the Interior
- 1994-2004 Head of the Tartu County branch of the Estonian Citizenship and Migration Board
- 2004–2005 Project manager of the charity fund "Hope"

== Recognition ==
- 8 October 2010: Lieutenant Kuperjanov's Merit (recognition of the Julius Kuperjanov Society)
- 21 February 2018: Order of the National Coat of Arms, 5th Class (by the decision of the President of the Republic of 5 February 2018)
