= Battle of Tartu (1919) =

1919 military conflict in Estonia during Estonian War of Independence

- Part of Estonian War of Independence
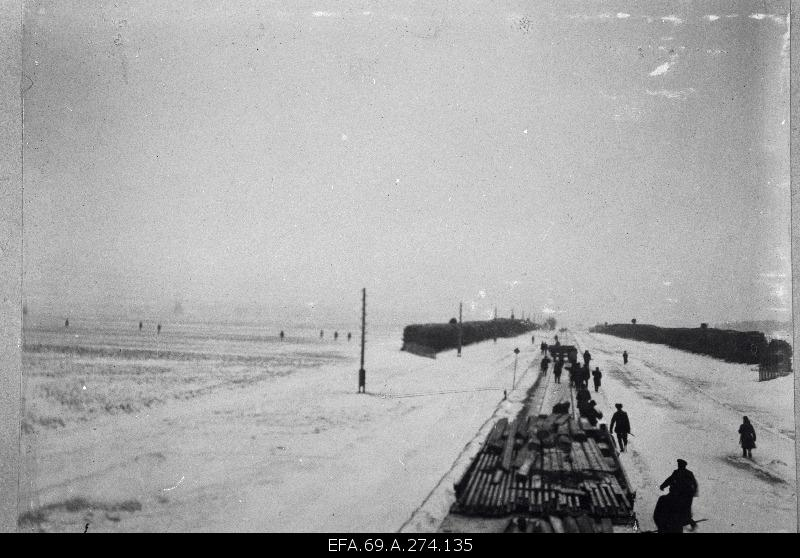
- Soldiers from the armored train near Tartu, in January 1919.
Location	Tartu, Estonia
Result	Estonian victory

Belligerents
Estonia: (Denmark) Danish volunteers	Soviet Russia

Commanders and leaders
(Estonia) Julius Kuperjanov (Estonia) Karl Parts (Estonia) Anton Irv	Aleksander Remezov; Gustavs Mangulis

The Battle of Tartu (Estonian: Tartu lahing) was fought between the 13th and 14th of January, 1919 in the Estonian War of Independence between the units of the Estonian 2nd Division and the forces of the Red Latvian Riflemen. The battle was a significant battle in the Estonian War of Independence, allowing Estonian troops to liberate the rest of Southern Estonia from Soviet forces.

== Course of the Battle ==
On January 9, the commander of the 2nd Division, Colonel Viktor Puskar, ordered the conquest of Tartu. Anton Irv and Karl Parts, the commanders of the armored trains, met the Tartumaa Partisan Battalion who had reached the railway in Kaarepere and made a proposal to Julius Kuperjanov to go to Tartu together. Kuperjanov agreed and the partisans were accommodated on the train.

Before arriving in Tartu, engaged in smaller fights on the evening of January 13 in Voldi, Äksi and Kärkna.

Arriving near Tartu, Armored train No. 1 sent out a group of men, which secured a bridge, allowing armored trains to safely cross the bridge and access the city. The Red Latvian Riflemen were unable to repel Estonian forces.

The city was cleared of the Soviet Forces on January 14, while the remaining Red Latvian Riflemen fled to the cities of Võru and Valga.

== The Tartu Credit Center Massacre ==
After Estonian troops arrived in Tartu, they found out that the Red forces had committed mass murder in Tartu, killing 19 civilians in the basement of the Tartu Credit Center at Kompanii Street 5, including the first Estonian Orthodox Bishop Platon, high priests Nikolai Bežanitski and Mikhail Bleive, and Moritz Wilhelm Paul Schwartz, pastor of Tartu St. John's Congregation, and 14 other civilians of Tartu.

== Memorial ==
In 1932, a memorial to the Battle of Tartu was installed in Tähtvere Park. It was demolished by the Soviets in 1941, rebuilt in 1942, demolished again in 1944 and rebuilt in 2006.
