= Julius Kuperjanov =

Estonian military personnel

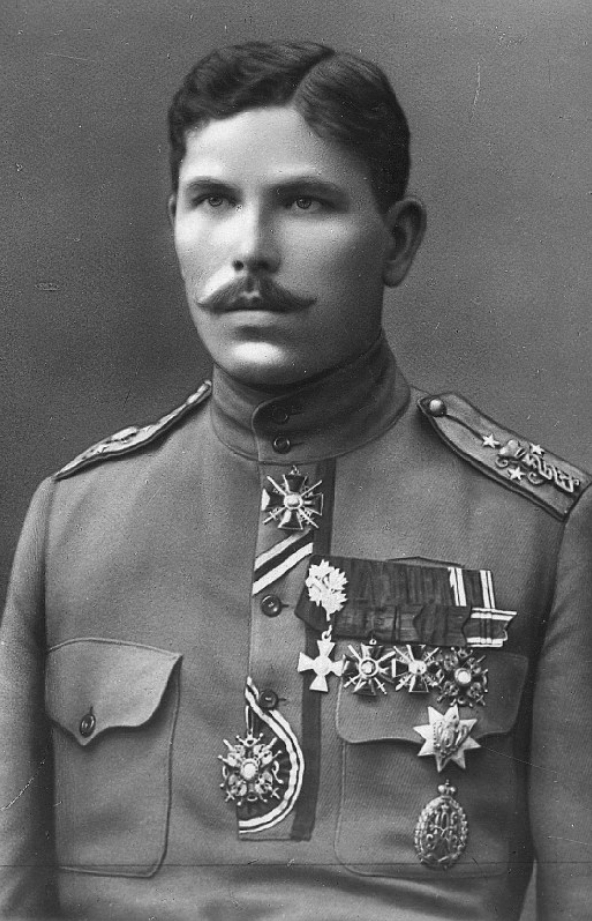
- Julius Kuperjanov
- Born: 11 October 1894; Lyokhovo, Dukhnovo parish, Pskov Governorate, Russian Empire
- Died: 2 February 1919 (aged 24); Tartu, Estonia
- Burial place: Raadi cemetery
- Spouse: Alice Johanson (m. 1918)
- Military career
- Allegiance: Russian Empire; Estonia
- Branch: Army
- Service years: 1914–1917 (Russia); 1918–1919 (Estonia)
- Rank: Lieutenant
- Unit: Tartumaa Partisan Battalion
- Conflicts: World War I; Estonian War of Independence; Battle of Paju; Battle of Tartu
- Awards: Order of St. Anna II, III, IV degree Cross of St. George IV degree Order of Vladimir IV degree Order of Stanislav II, III degree Cross of Liberty (Estonia) (VR I/2, VR II/2 and II/3; posthumously)

Julius Kuperjanov VR I/2, VR II/2 and VR II/3 (11 October [O.S. 29 September] 1894 – 2 February 1919) was an Estonian military officer who helped to liberate Tartu during the War of Independence, and was the commander of the Tartumaa Partisan Battalion, posthumously renamed the Kuperjanov Infantry Battalion.

== Life ==
=== Early life ===
Kuperjanov was born on 11 October 1894 to Taniel and Liisi Kuperjanov (née Reben); a family of Estonian immigrants living in Pskov, Russia. Because his parents emigrated to Russia for work, they acquired a russified form of their family name (original Kupper). After returning to Estonia, they preserved this name.

In 1904, his family returned to Estonia and resided in Tartu county. After five years of studies at the 2-class ministry school in Sipel Vana-Kuuste in Kambja municipality, Kuperjanov entered the Tartu Teachers' Seminar in 1910. After finishing school in 1914, he asked to be appointed as a teacher at the village school in Kambja, due to the school set to be closed due to the lack of teachers who were mobilized for the First World War.

On 26 February 1918, Kuperjanov married Alice Johanson.

=== Military service ===
At the start of World War I, he was mobilized into the Imperial Russian Army and commissioned after receiving basic training at Vladamir Military School in Saint Petersburg. He was wounded in both legs in July 1917.

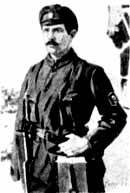
Kuperjanov in the Tartumaa Battalion Uniform (indicated by patch)

In 1917 he joined the Estonian forces during the start of the War of Independence. In December 1918, he received permission to form a ranger battalion. Students were among the first to join the Tartumaa Partisan Battalion.

=== Liberation of Tartu ===
In the early morning of January 5, 1919, the first village in Southern Estonia was liberated: Saduküla, after which steps were taken to liberate Tartu as early as January 7, but it was postponed due to the passivity of the 2nd Division and the 2nd Infantry Regiment. The offensive towards Tartu started on January 10, and on January 13, against the will of the superiors, two wide-gauge armored trains arrived from Haljala. During the general offensive of the Red Army during the liberation of Tartu, the Tartumaa Partisan Battalion was the first to invade the city on 14 January 1919 with armored trains. With the support of armored trains, they headed from there in the direction of Elva, Rõngu, Puka and Sangaste, and on January 30, 1919, fierce battles were reached near Valga, where the Paju Manor was liberated.

=== Wounding and death ===
In the Battle of Paju, on 31 January, Lieutenant Kuperjanov was trying to observe the activities of a division far by the railway, a bullet fired from a Russian Armored Train penetrated the side of his left hand and punctured his lungs and kidneys. The wounded Kuperjanov was taken to the Sangaste railway station, which was going to the hospital, but the train which held the wounded did not leave until 6.5 hours later. 24 year old Kuperjanov died at the Faure Clinic in Tartu on February 2, 1919, due to inflammation.

== Contemporary view ==
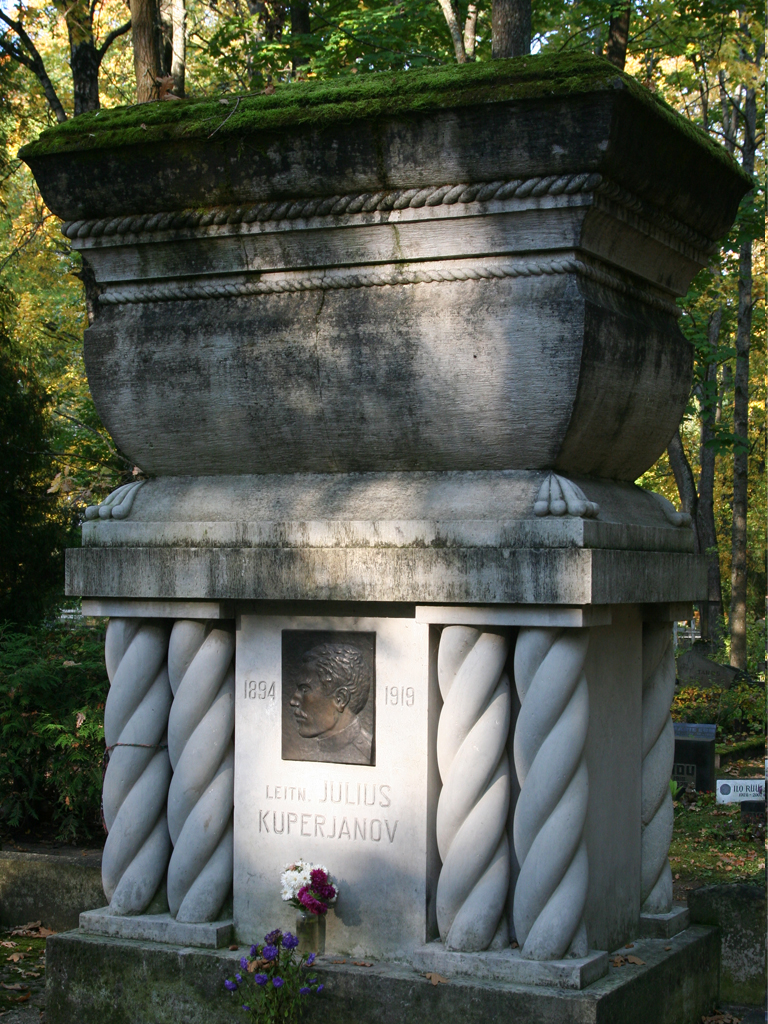
The Julius Kuperjanov monument unrestored

The discharge of Lieutenant Julius Kuperjanov took place in the Vanemuine Concert Hall, where representatives of many societies in Southern Estonia had gathered. General Martin Wetzer, the leader of the Western Front, and the delegates of Tartu and Valga spoke with remarks. Commander-in-Chief Johan Laidoner expressed his condolences to the Tartu Partisan Battalion in the event of the fall of the commander and initiated the renaming of the unit to the Kuperjanov Battalion. It was disbanded in 1940 after the Soviet occupation and re-established after Estonia regained its independence from the Soviet Union.

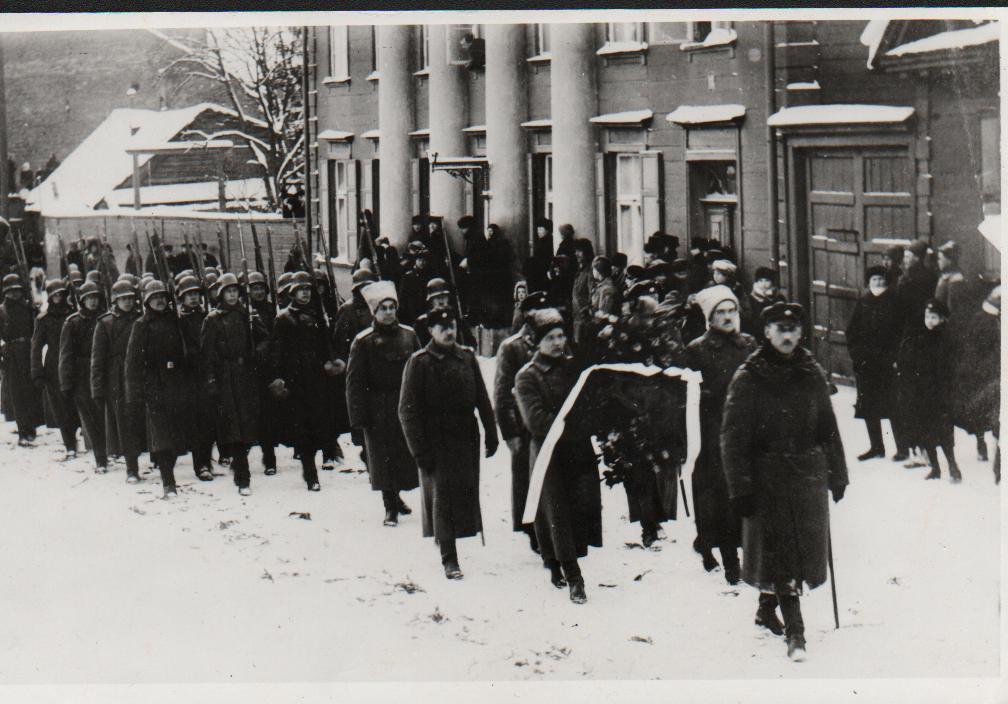
Funeral procession of Julius Kuperjanov, Karl Einbund in front, 1919

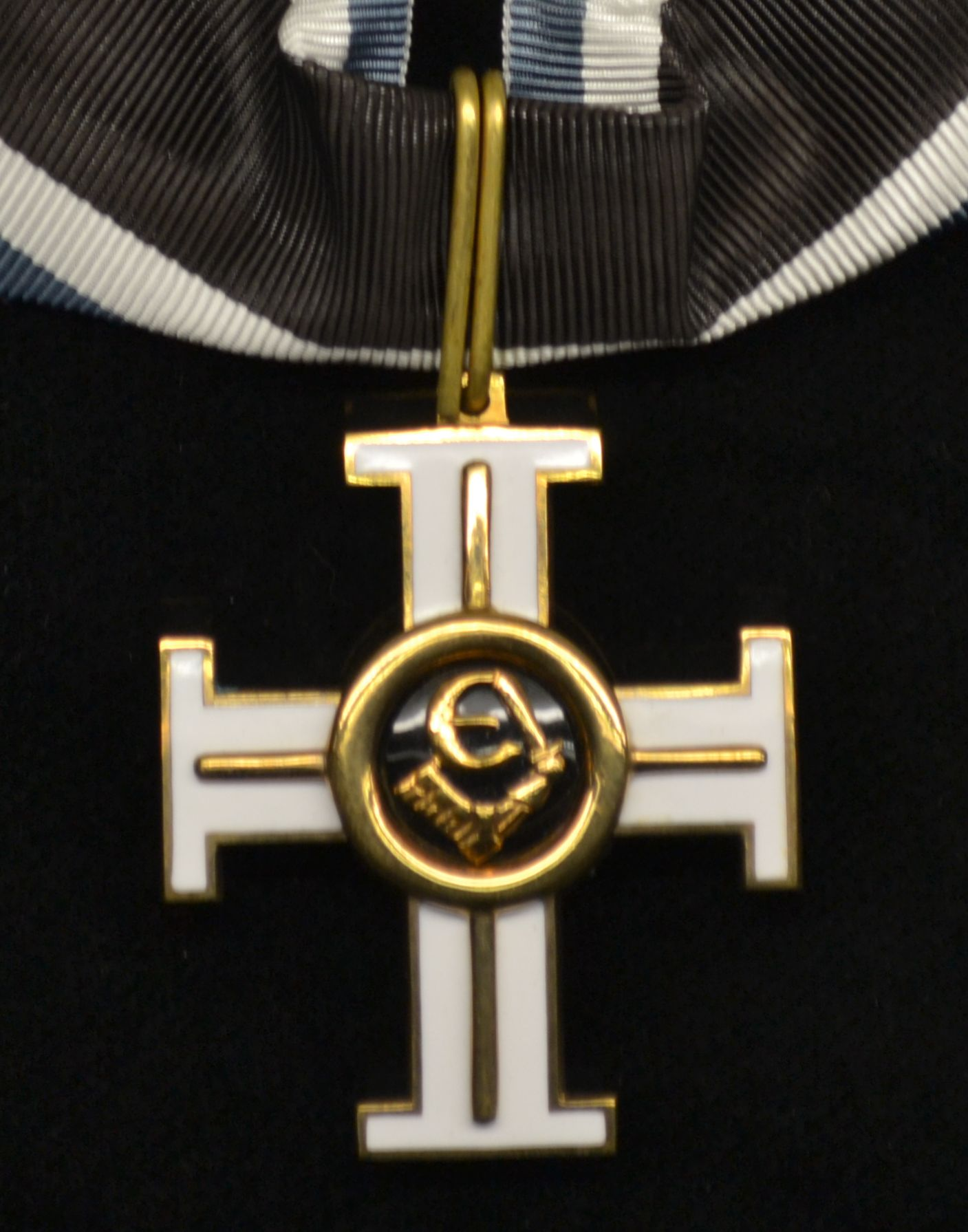
Estonian Cross of Liberty (1st Grade/1st Class) which was one of three medals Kuperjanov was awarded

Julius Kuperjanov was posthumously awarded the Cross of Liberty (VR I/2, VR II/2 and II/3). His tomb at the Raadi cemetery, Tartu, was one of the few War of Independence monuments to survive the Soviet occupation. The monument was restored in 2008. During the Soviet occupation of Estonia from 1940 to 1991, Kuperjanov's tomb acquired great symbolic significance. Dissidents and patriotically minded students would periodically gather there on various anniversaries to light candles and place flowers in his memory. During the occupation period, the KGB kept watch on the tomb, and arrested anyone who came to honor the memory of the national hero.

In 2009, a commemorative stamp was issued to mark the 90th anniversary of Kuperjanov's death by Eesti Post.

Certain Streets in Tartu, Valga and Põltsamaa were named in memoriam of Julius Kuperjanov.

=== The Julius Kuperjanov Society ===
The Kuperjanov Partisan Porgu Society was also established on December 23, 1938, under the leadership of Lieutenant Colonel J. Soodla. In 2010, the Society established a commemorative medal for Lieutenant Kuperjanov, which are awarded to those citizens whose activities for the well-being of the indigenous people of Estonia have been transparently honest, purposeful and self-sacrificing.

To date, a total of 6 persons have been awarded the Medal of Lieutenant Kuperjanov:

- Julius Kuperjanov, posthumously
- Johannes Soodla, posthumously (hero of the Battle of Paju and founder of the Kuperjanov Society)
- Ülo Adamson (leader of the Kuperjanov organization during the Soviet Occupation, deported)
- Jüri Pertmann (leader of the Kuperjanov organization during the Soviet Occupation, deported)
- Villu Kibena (leader of the Kuperjanov organization during Soviet Occupation, deported)
- Artur Sirk, posthumously (Infamous soldier of the War of Independence, died due to suspicious circumstances).

=== Tartumaa Partisan Battalion ===
Insignia of the Kuperjanov Infantry Battalion

The Tartumaa Partisan Battalion, which was led by him and renamed for his memorium, was restored in 1992 after the Estonian Restoration of Independence, and is still a division of the Estonian Defense Forces in Võru to this day.

== See also ==
- Kuperjanov Infantry Battalion
- Estonian War of Independence
