= 25th Artillery Battalion (Estonia) =

Estonian military unit

- 25. suurtükiväepataljon
- Insignia of the 25th Artillery Battalion
- Active: 1919 – 1940; 2014 – present
- Country: Estonia
- Branch: Estonian Land Forces
- Type: Artillery
- Role: Fire support
- Size: Battalion
- Part of: 2nd Infantry Brigade
- Anniversaries: 21 January – Formation date 1 August – Restoration date

Commanders
- Current commander: Major Meelis Tasa

25th Artillery Battalion (Estonian: 25. suurtükiväepataljon) of the 2nd Infantry Brigade is a reserve artillery battalion of the Estonian Land Forces. During peacetime, the unit is tasked with preparing reserve personnel through training exercises. During wartime, the unit is tasked with providing indirect fire support for combat units.

== History ==
=== 1919 - 1940 ===
The battalion follows in the tradition of the 2nd Artillery Regiment, which was formed in Tallinn on January 21, 1919, by captain Herbert Brede. On February 15, the headquarters moved to Tartu Karlova manor. By the end of February, the regiment had managed to form a headquarters and seven batteries. The 7th battery was initially assembled under the Kuperjanov Infantry Battalion and then properly formed under the 2nd Artillery Regiment. The battery was also known as the "partisan battery" because of its roots in the Kuperjanov Battalion. On April 26, the headquarters moved to Võru. On August 1, 1919, captain Johannes Orasmaa (then Johannes Roska) was appointed the commander of the unit, he took up the position on August 19. On August 31, while inspecting the units of the 2nd Artillery Regiment, he led a successful defence in Pechorsky district against Red Army units, which had managed to break through the lines of the 7th regiment. The attack was held back purely by artillery fire. In September, the batteries were formed into two artillery groups. On October 15, 1919, Podpolkovnik (Lt.Colonel) Georg Feofanov became the commander of the unit. By January 1920, the regiment consisted of seven field batteries (number 4, 8, 9, 10, 11, 12 and 13), with 27 artillery guns, 519 rifles, 3 machine guns, 35 officers, 3 doctors, 10 officials and 1190 soldiers. On May 20, 1920, the unit was reformed into the 2nd Field Artillery Division, and on January 1, 1921, renamed back to the 2nd Artillery Regiment. In 1940, the Soviets occupied Estonia and all military units were disbanded.

=== 2014 - present ===
The Artillery Battalion was formed together with the 2nd Infantry Brigade on August 1, 2014. The battalion received its flag on January 24, 2017. On August 8, 2017, major Meelis Laanemets replaced major Marko Tomentšuk as the battalions commander. The unit is equipped with 122 mm D-30 howitzers and has been participating in exercises since at least 2016. The 122 mm D-30 howitzers will be replaced by K9 Thunder self-propelled howitzers.

== See also ==
- 2nd Infantry Brigade (Estonia)
- Kuperjanov Infantry Battalion
- Artillery Battalion, 1st Infantry Brigade
