= Kupriyanov =

Kupriyanov (Russian: Куприянов) is a Russian masculine surname derived from the given name Ciprian. Its feminine counterpart is Kupriyanova. It may refer to the following notable people:

- Aleksandr Kupriyanov (born 1952), Russian football player
- Ludmila Kupriyanova (1914–1987), Russian palynologist
- Mikhail Kupriyanov (born 1973), Russian football player

== See also ==
- Kuperjanov
- Kupreyanov
- Kuprejanov
