= Paju, Valga County =

Village in Estonia

Paju
- village
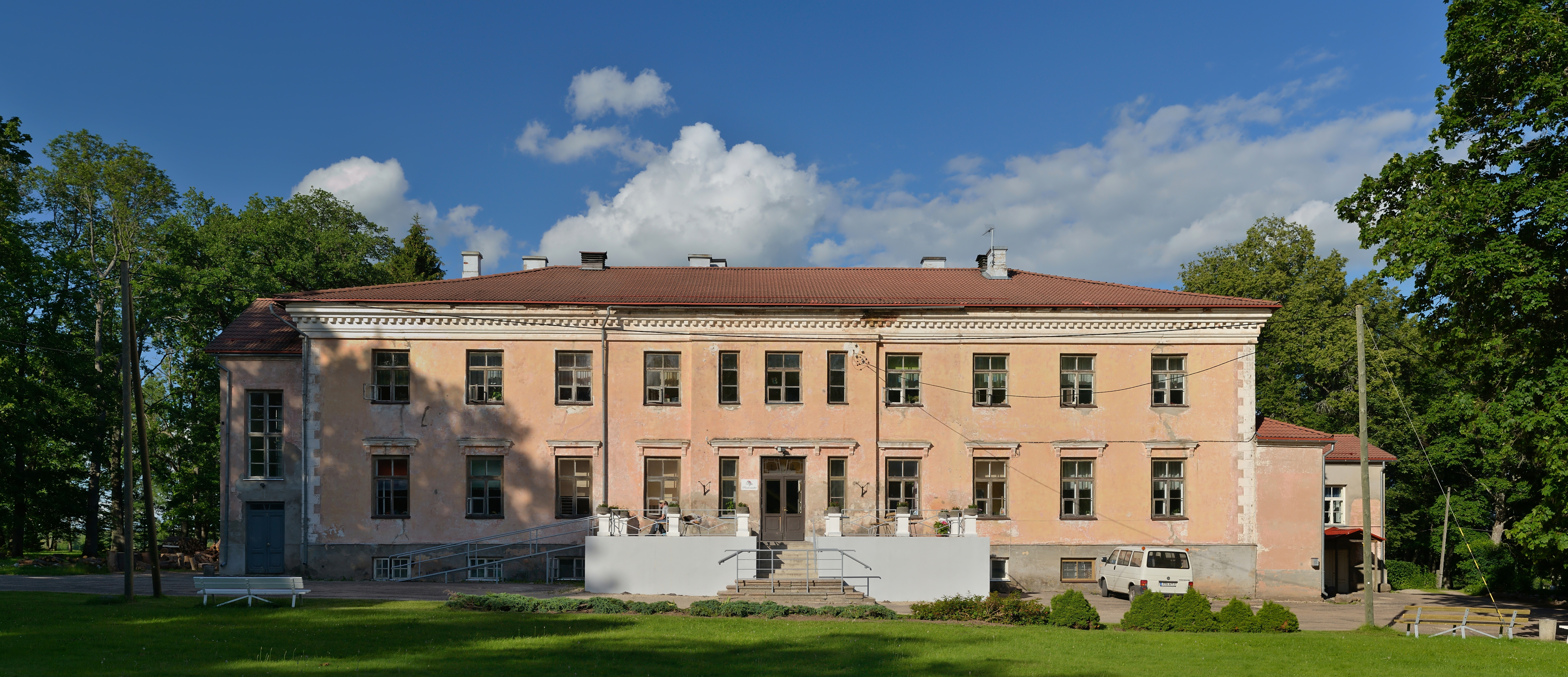
- Paju manor

- Location in Estonia
- Coordinates: 57°49′16″N 26°06′36″E
- Country: Estonia
- County: Valga County
- Municipality: Valga Parish

Area
  - Total: 9.341 km^{2} (3.607 sq mi)

Population (01.01.2011)
  - Total: 80
  - Density: 8.6/km^{2} (22/sq mi)

Paju is a village in Valga Parish, Valga County, southern Estonia. It is located about 6 km northeast of the town of Valga. Paju has a population of 80 (as of 2011) and an area of 9.341 km².

Paju Manor (German: Luhde-Großhof) was established in 1748 by detaching it from the Lugaži Manor (Luhde, nowadays in Latvia). From the 1850s to the dispossession in 1919 it belonged to the Stryks. The late-classicist two-storey main building was completed around 1860. Since 1960, a nursing home is operating in the manor.

Paju is best known for Battle of Paju, one of the heaviest battles of the Estonian War of Independence. It took place on 31 January 1919 around the manor. The result was Estonian victory over the Soviets.

The Tartu road (part of E264) passes through Paju. Also the Tartu–Valga railway is bordering Paju on its southeastern side.

== Battle of Paju memorial ==
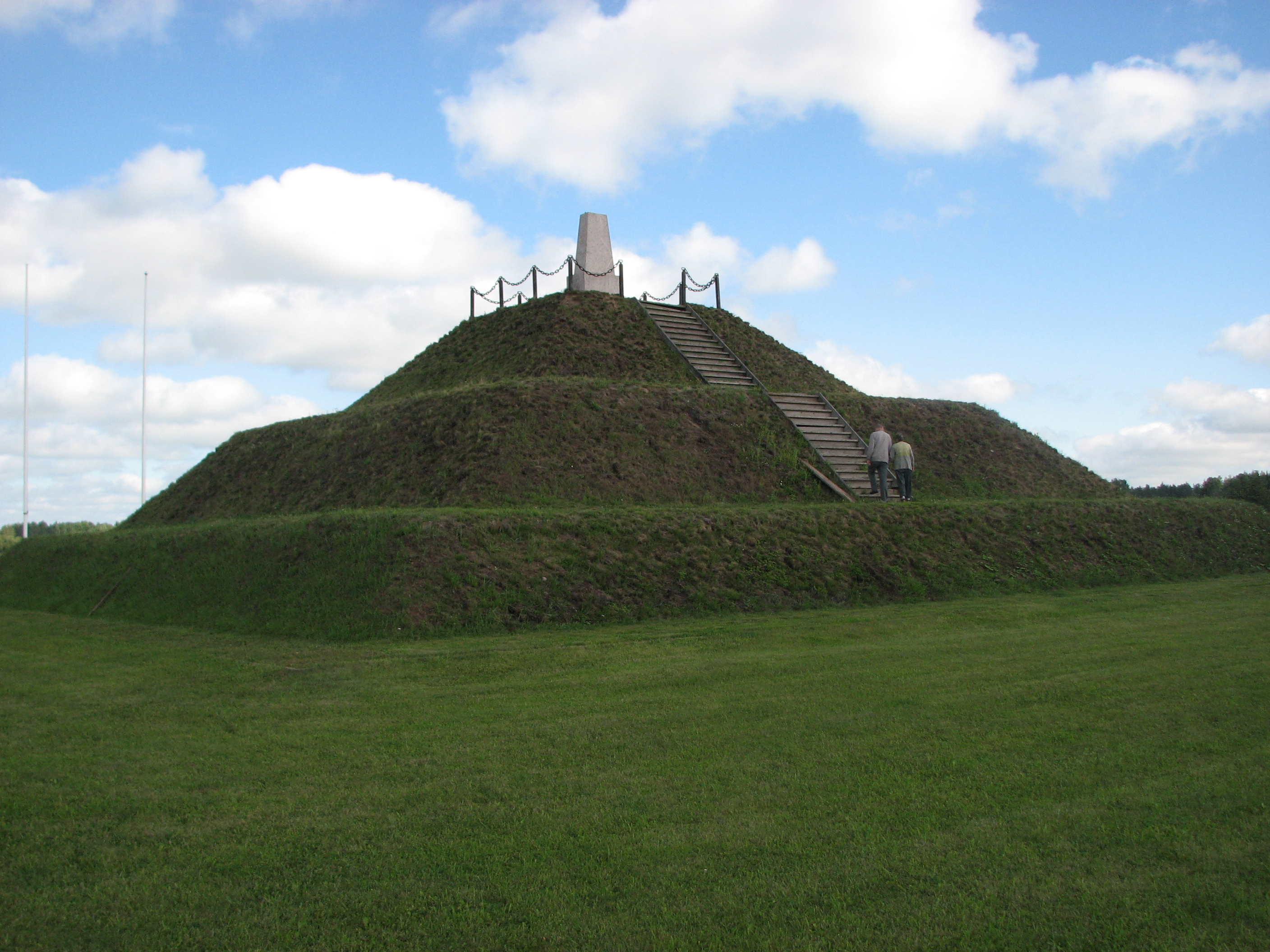

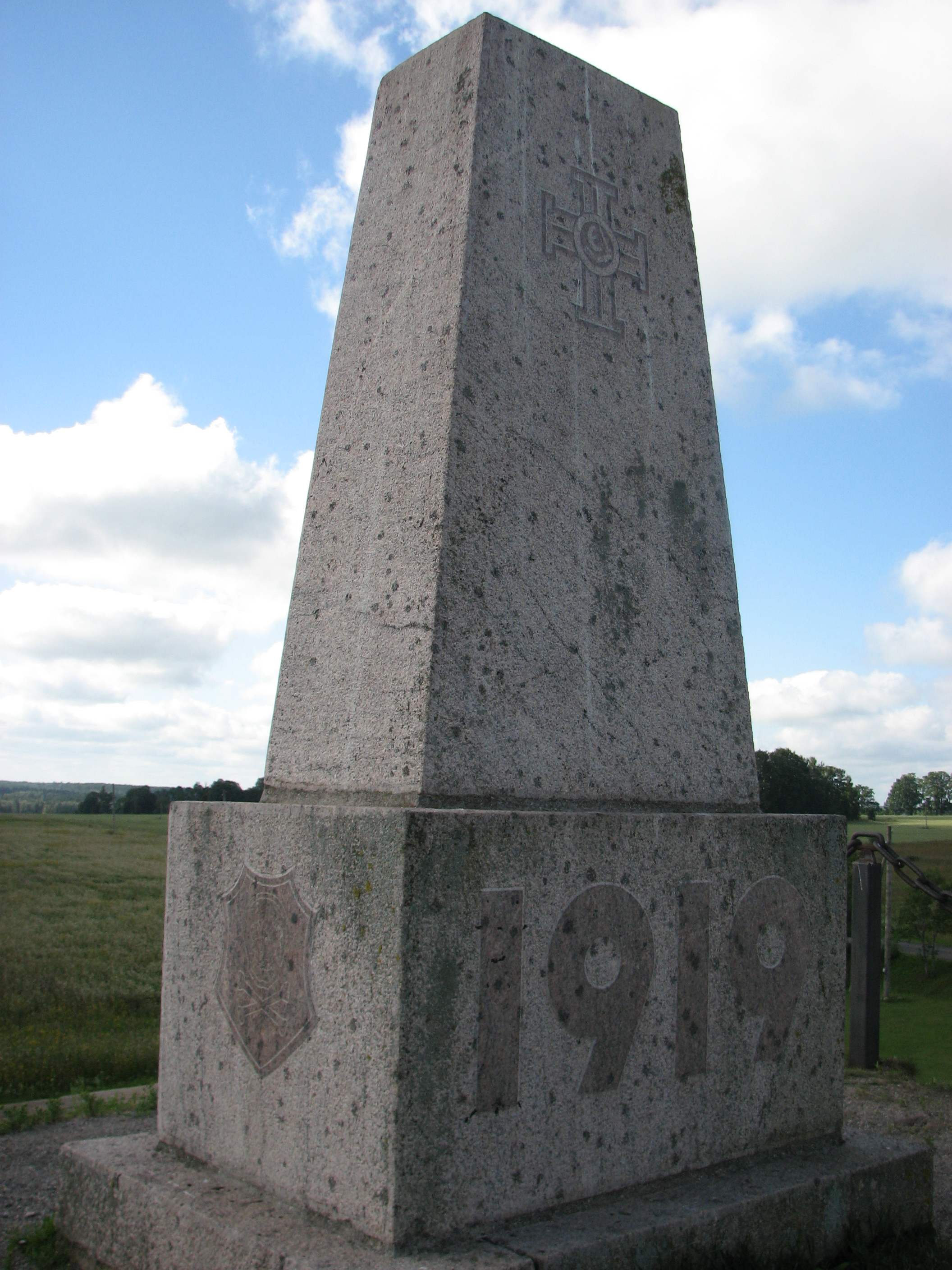

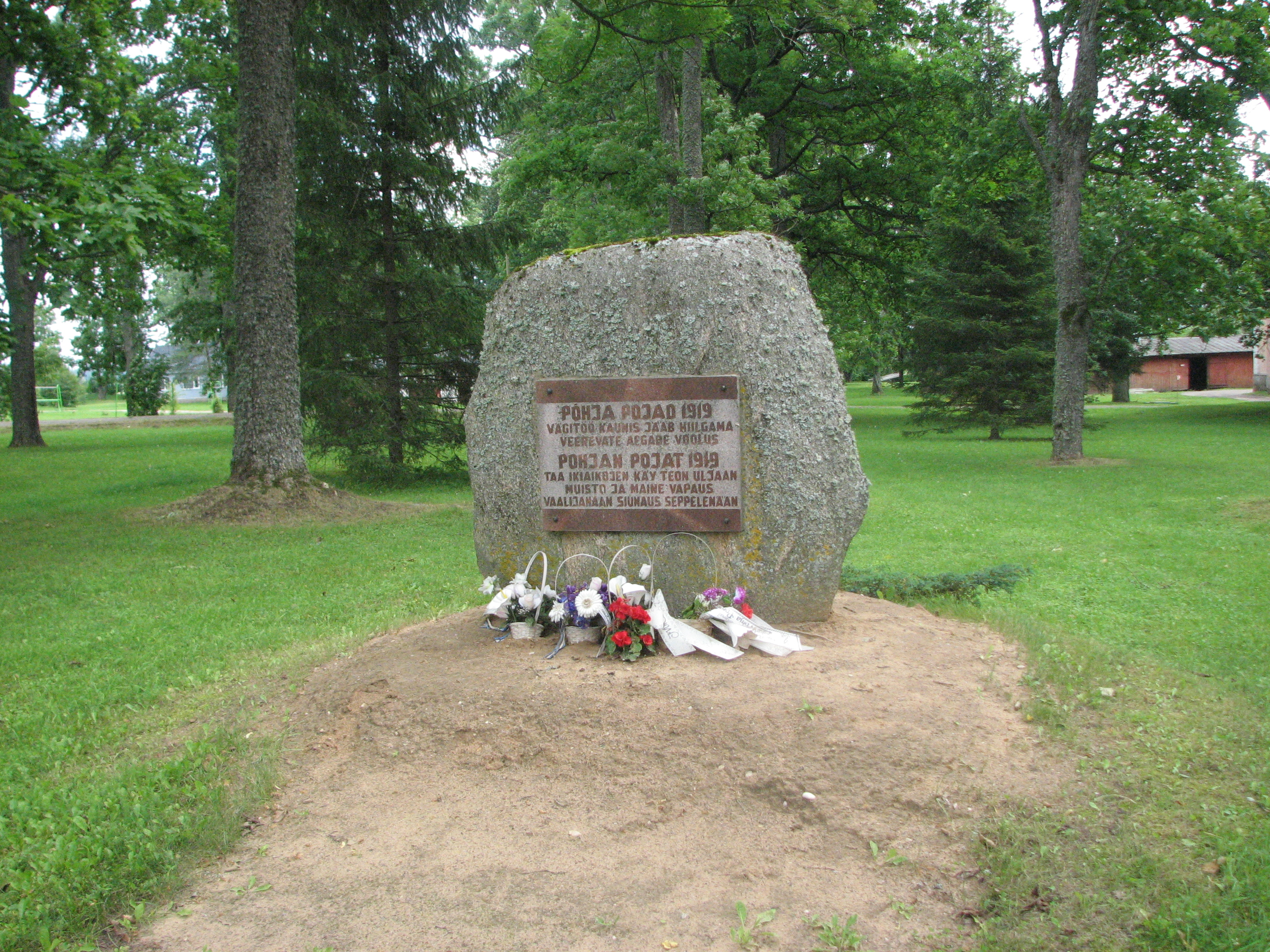
