= Taara Army Base =

Military base in Võru, Estonia

- Taara sõjaväelinnak
- Võru, Estonia
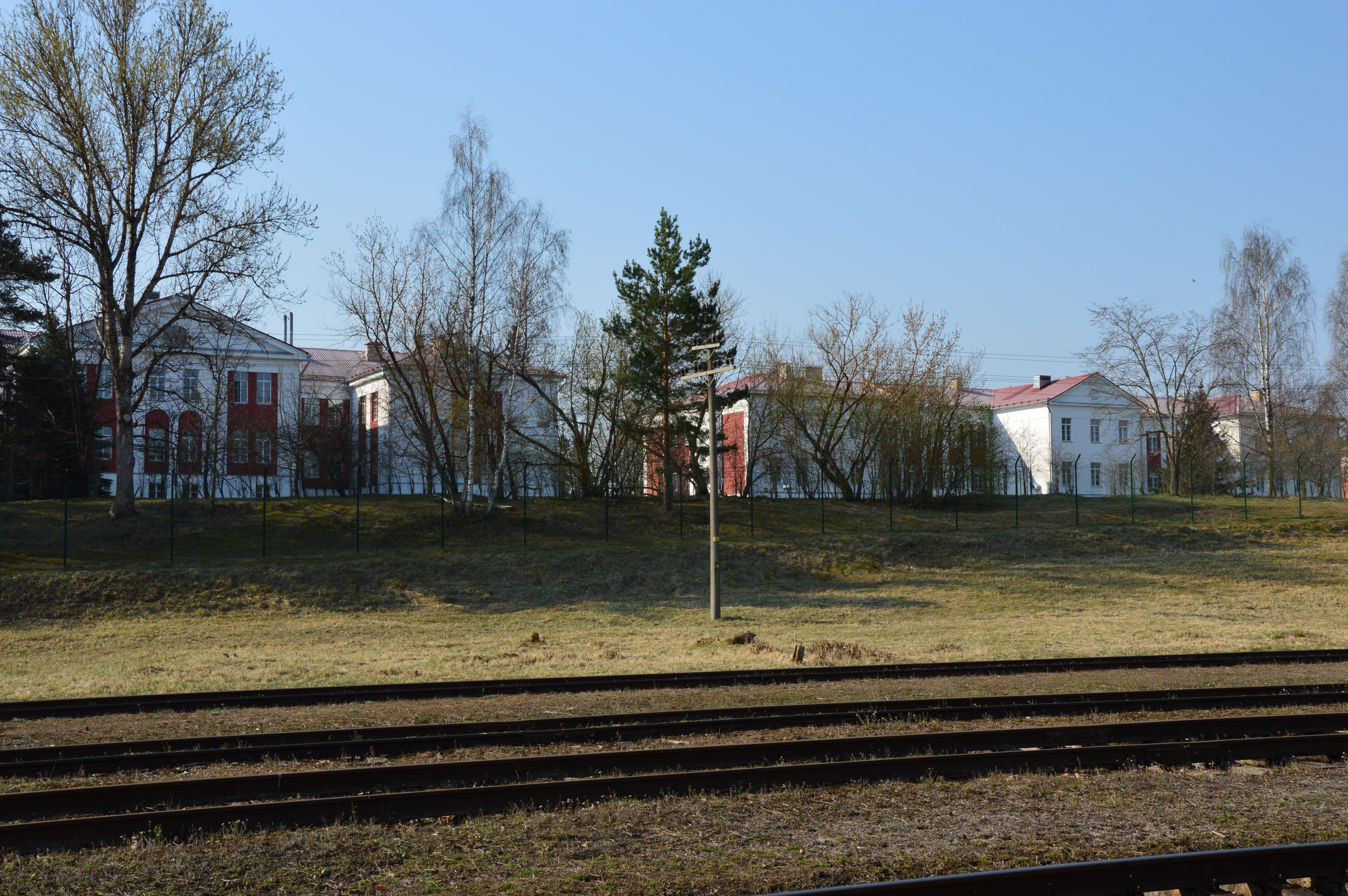
- Taara Army Base from the north

Site information
- Type: Army base
- Owner: Estonian Defence Forces
- Operator: 2nd Infantry Brigade

Location
- Coordinates: 57°49′31.5″N 27°1′21.52″E

Site history
- Built: 1926–1928
- In use: 1928-present

Garrison information
- Garrison: 2nd Infantry Brigade
- Occupants: Kuperjanov Infantry Battalion; Combat Service Support Battalion

The Taara Army Base (Estonian: Taara sõjaväelinnak) or Camp Taara is a military installation of the Estonian Defence Forces located in Võru, in South Estonia.

== History ==
The Taara military facilities were built between 1926 and 1928. Its current uses include as a site for basic training of conscripts.

Until 2024 when the Reedi military camp was constructed Taara was also used to house foreign troops on deployment to Estonia. In 2023 this included more than 300 US troops.

=== Structure ===
The Taara Army Base is the main Army facility of what used to be called the: Southern Defence District. It accommodates the following units:

2nd Infantry Brigade (HQ in Tartu)

- Kuperjanov Infantry Battalion — currently engaged in training the rest of the forces that will make up the 2nd Brigade.
- Combat Service Support Battalion

The 2nd Infantry Brigade will continue to activate further units to reach full strength by 2022 at the latest.

== See also ==
- Tapa Army Base
- Ämari Air Base
