= Tähtvere =

Neighbourhood of Tartu, Estonia

Coordinates: 58°22′54.42″N 26°42′9.1″E

- Neighbourhood of Tartu
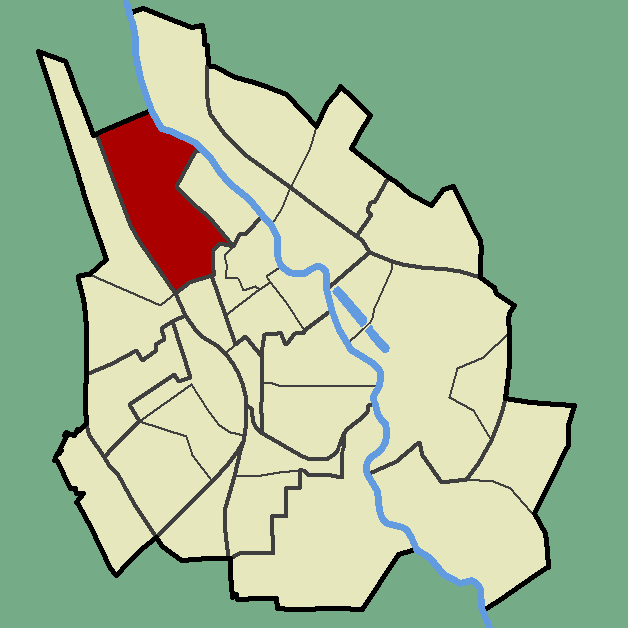
- Location of Tähtvere in Tartu.
- Country: Estonia
- County: Tartu County
- City: Tartu

Area
  - Total: 2.50 km^{2} (0.97 sq mi)

Population (31.12.2013)
  - Total: 2,989
  - Density: 1,200/km^{2} (3,100/sq mi)

Tähtvere is a neighbourhood of Tartu, Estonia. It has a population of 2,989 (as of 31 December 2013) and an area of 2.50 km^{2} (0.97 mi^{2}).

== Gallery ==
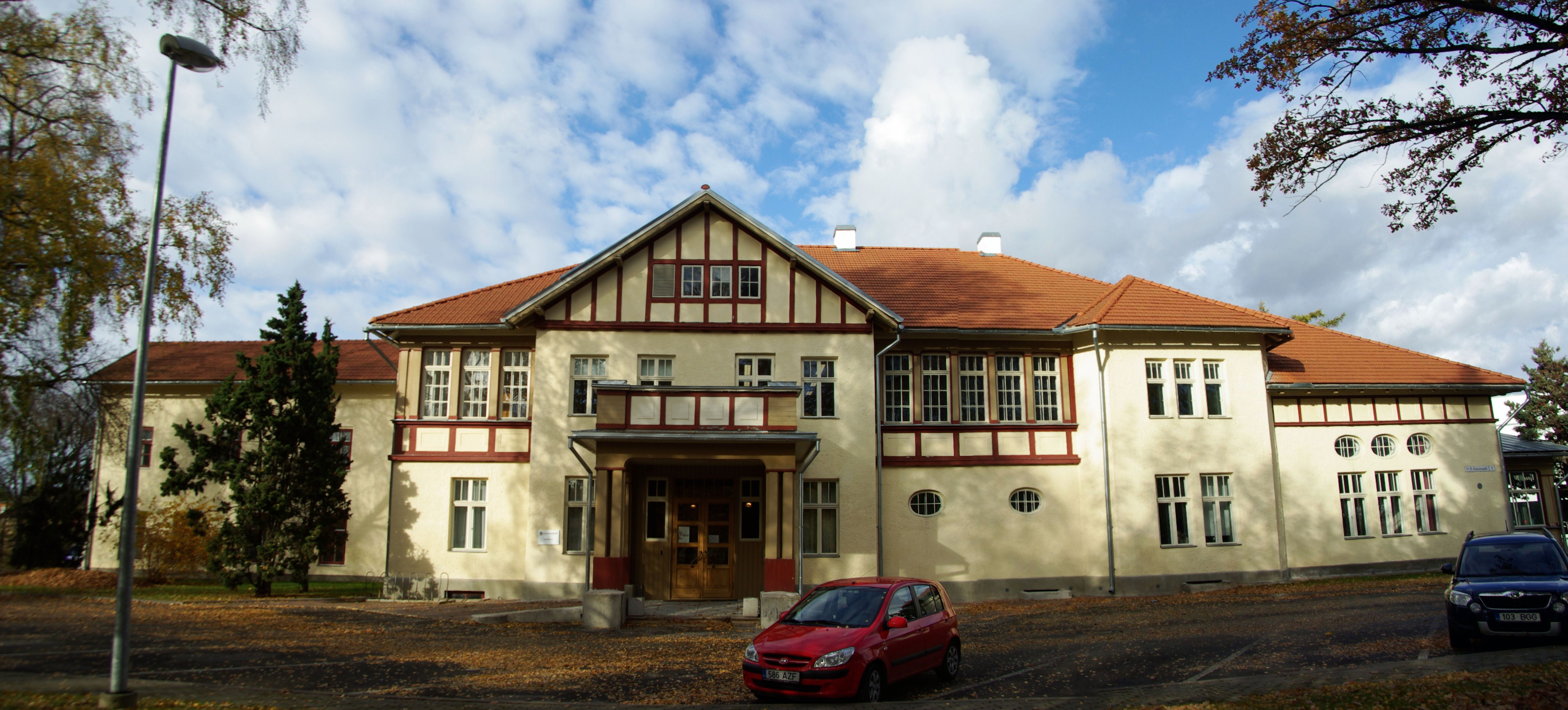
Tähtvere Manor

== See also ==
- Estonian University of Life Sciences
- Tartu Song Festival Grounds
- A. Le Coq
