= Felix Johannes Oinas =

Estonian folklorist and linguist

Felix Oinas
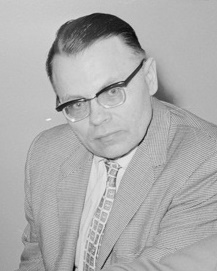
- Felix Oinas in 1962
- Born: 6 March 1911; Kambja, Governorate of Livonia, Russian Empire
- Died: 25 September 2004 (aged 93); Bloomington, Indiana, United States
- Occupations: Folklorist, linguist, and translator

Felix Johannes Oinas (6 March 1911 – 25 September 2004) was an Estonian folklorist, linguist, and translator.

== Early life and career ==
Felix Oinas was born in Kambja to the dairy farmer Ernst Oinas (1885–1975) and his wife Marie (née Saarik, 1885–1960), who was a homemaker. He grew up in the village of Maltsa. Ernst had a keen interest in literature and maintained a small library. Felix became an avid reader during elementary school, particularly interested in Estonian folklore and literature.

Felix Oinas attended the University of Tartu, receiving his M.A in Finno-Ugric languages, folklore, and comparative literature in 1938. He later taught the Estonian language at University of Budapest in Hungary, as well as conducting research on Hungarian literature, and translating Hungarian works into Estonian.

After returning to Estonia, Oinas fled the Soviet occupation and annexation in 1944 with his wife Lisbet and children. While living as displaced persons in Germany, Oinas studied Slavic linguistics and literature. In 1949, the family emigrated to the United States after Oinas was hired as a research assistant for the Slavic Department at Wayne State University in Detroit. After a year in Detroit, he moved to Bloomington, Indiana and taught Finno-Ugric languages and folklore at Indiana University Bloomington. Oinas also became a Russian language instructor while simultaneously studying theoretical and Slavic linguistics and working at the Folklore Institute with American folklorist Stith Thompson.

In 1952, Oinas received his PhD in linguistics. Oinas taught Russian and Old Church Slavonic at Indiana University Bloomington's Slavic Department in addition to folklore. In 1961, he received Fulbright and Guggenheim grants to conduct research at Helsinki University, and in 1964 he received a second Guggenheim fellowship, which he used to conduct research in Zagreb, Croatia.

In 1960, Oinas was appointed chairman of Indiana University Bloomington's Ural-Altaic Department, and later became a professor in the Slavic and Ural-Altaic Departments and at the Folklore Institute. Oinas taught Church Slavonic, Russian Literature, reading of Old Slavonic texts, and the history of Russian literary language. In the folklore department he taught Russian, Finnish, and Balto-Finnic folklore, Finno-Ugric and Siberian mythology, and religion.

Oinas published 23 books, 250 articles, 130 reviews, and translated several books from Hungarian into English. Some of the most notable areas of work by Oinas included Finnic and Slavic folklore, the relation of Finnic folklore compared to Baltic (Latvian and Lithuanian) folklore, mythology (particularly the study of spirits, ghosts, devils, and vampires), the study of Slavic and Finnic etymologies, and as an expert on the Estonian epic Kalevipoeg and the Finnish epic Kalevala.

== Personal life and death ==
Feix Oinas married Lisbet Kõvve. Their son Valdar Oinas is an astrophysicist. Oinas died in 2004 in Bloomington, Indiana, aged 93.

== Honors ==
In 1997 Felix Oinas was awarded the Order of the National Coat of Arms, II class.

== Selected works ==
- Petőfi: vabaduse ja armastuse laulik. Eesti Kirjanduse Selts, Tartu, 1939
- Kalevipoeg kütkeis ja muid esseid rahvaluulest, mütoloogiast ja kirjandusest. Toronto, 1979
- Basic Course in Estonian, 4th ed, Indiana University, Bloomington IN, 1979
- Vargamäe tõde ja õigus. Stockholm, 1984
- Surematu Kalevipoeg. Tallinn, 1994
- Tuul heidab magama. Tallinn, 1999
