= Battle of Paju =

1919 military conflict in Estonia during Estonian War of Independence

- Part of Estonian War of Independence
- Battle of Paju. Painting by Maximilian Maksolly
Date	31 January 1919
Location	Paju Manor, near Valga 57°49′13″N 26°06′42″E
Result	Estonian victory

Belligerents
Estonia (Finland) Finnish volunteers	Latvian Socialist Soviet Republic; Soviet Russia

Commanders and leaders
(Estonia) (Finland) Hans Kalm (Estonia) Julius Kuperjanov † (Estonia) Johannes Soodla	Emīls Vītols

Units involved
(Estonia) Tartumaa Partisan Battalion (Finland) Pohjan Pojat	Red Latvian Riflemen

Strength
Estonia: 300 soldiers 13 machine guns 2 field guns Finnish volunteers: 380 soldiers 9 machine guns 4 field guns Total: 683 soldiers 22 machine guns 6 field guns	1,200 soldiers 32 machine guns 4 field guns 1 armoured train

Casualties and losses
156	300 dead

The Battle of Paju (Estonian: Paju lahing) was fought in Paju, near Valga, Estonia, on 31 January 1919 during the Estonian War of Independence. After heavy fighting, the Tartu-Valga group of the Estonian Army pushed the Red Latvian Riflemen out of the Paju Manor. It was the fiercest battle in the early period of war. Estonian commander Julius Kuperjanov fell in the fighting.

== Background ==
In early January 1919 Estonian forces had started a full-scale counterattack against invading Soviets. Their main objective was liberating north Estonia including Narva, which was achieved by 17 January. They then started to advance into south Estonia. On 14 January the Tartumaa Partisan Battalion, organised and led by Lt. Julius Kuperjanov, and armoured trains liberated Tartu.

At that time the only working railway connection to Riga, which the Red Army had captured on 3 January, passed through Valga, so defending it had strategic importance for Soviet Russia. Among other units, a large part of the elite Latvian Riflemen were sent to stop the Estonians. Commander-in-chief Johan Laidoner reinforced the Estonian advance in the south, including Finnish volunteers, The Sons of the North, led by Col. Hans Kalm. Finnish Gen. Paul Martin Wetzer became commander of the southern front.

== Battle ==
To liberate Valga it was necessary to capture Paju Manor. On 30 January Estonian partisans had captured it, but were soon pushed out. With his 300 men, two guns and 13 machine guns Kuperjanov decided to recapture Paju on 31 January. Armoured trains were unable to support, due to the destruction of Sangaste railway bridge. The Latvian Riflemen had about 1,200 men with four guns and 32 machine guns. They were also able to rely on support from a Soviet armoured train and armoured cars.

The Tartumaa Partisan Battalion attacked the manor directly over open fields. At 400 metres the Bolsheviks opened fire, inflicting heavy casualties. Kuperjanov led the attack personally, as usual, and was badly wounded, dying two days later. When he was hit, Lt. Johannes Soodla took command of the battalion. Finnish Sons of the North units with about 380 men arrived later, bringing with them four guns and nine machine guns. They also assaulted the manor in a frontal attack, which caused heavy losses.

In the evening the Estonians and Finns finally pushed into the park of the estate where heavy hand-to-hand combat started, which resulted in the capture of the manor. Retreating Latvian Riflemen were subjected to heavy fire. The next day the Estonians marched into Valga without resistance.

== Aftermath ==
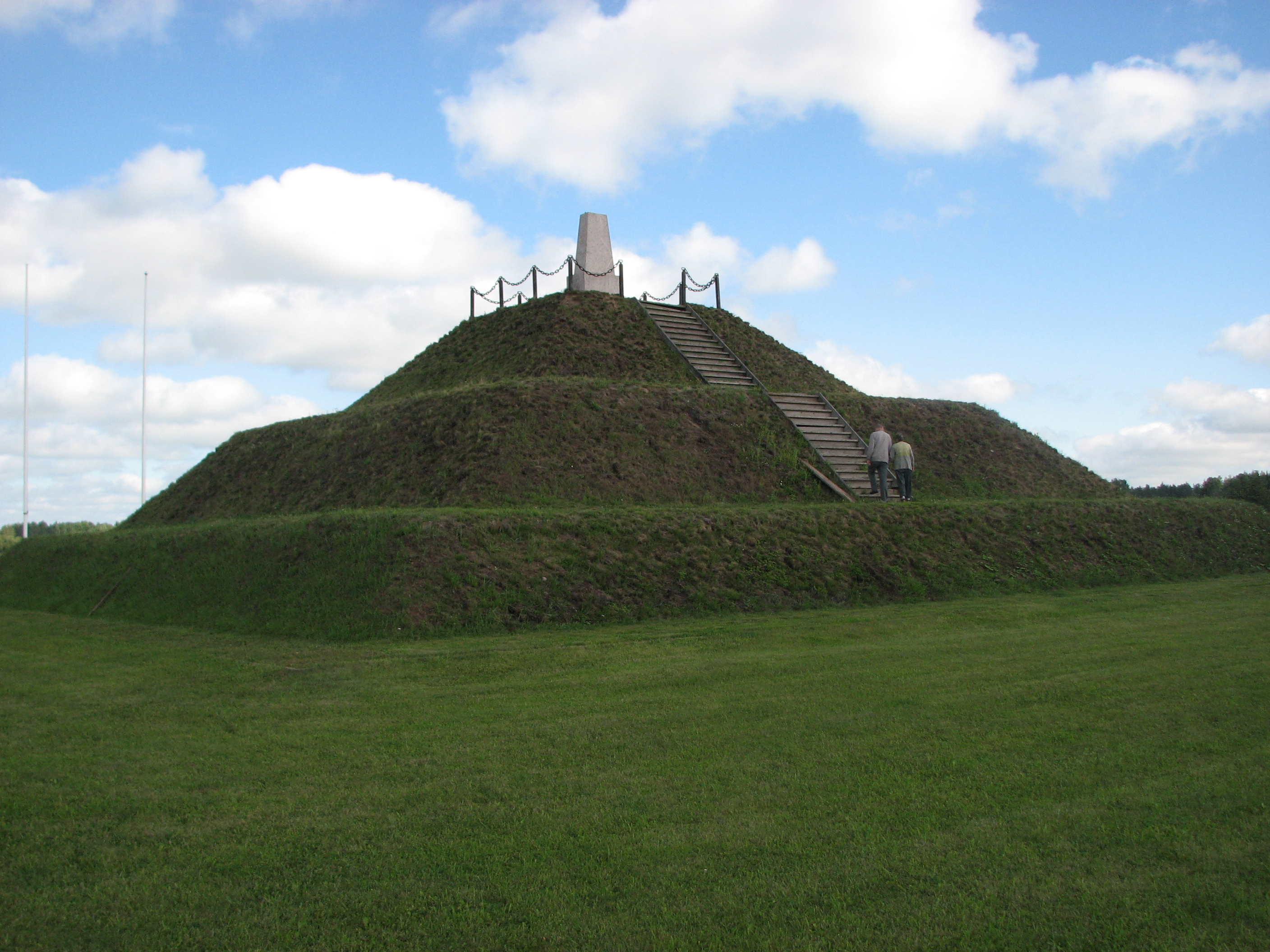
Battle of Paju memorial.

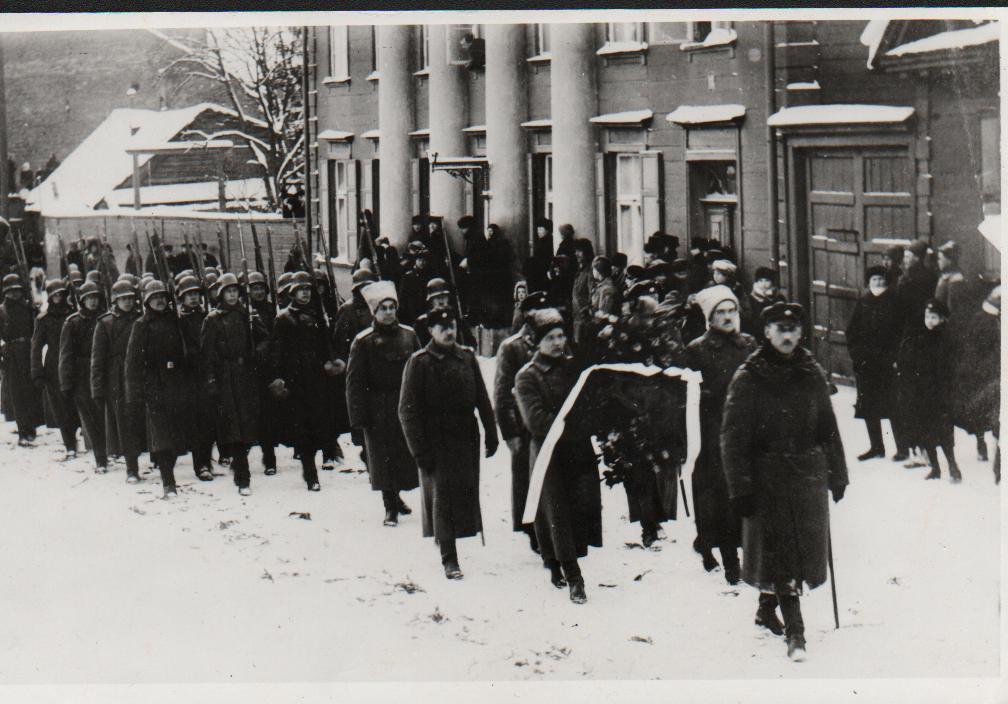
Funeral of Julius Kuperjanov, Tartu, 1919

The bloody Battle of Paju resulted in the liberation of Valga the next day. The victory cut off the Soviets' railway supply line and denied them the use of armoured trains. Soon almost all of southern Estonia was liberated and Estonian troops advanced into northern Latvia.

To honour Julius Kuperjanov, who died of the wounds he sustained during the battle, on 2 February, the Tartumaa Partisan Battalion was renamed Kuperjanov's Partisan Battalion. The current Estonian Defence Force still includes the Kuperjanov Battalion. The battle is commemorated by a granite monument on a three–step pyramid of earth, which was reopened by Estonian President Lennart Meri in 1994 on the 75th anniversary of the battle.

== See also ==
- Estonian War of Independence
- Heimosodat
- Latvian Riflemen
- Latvian War of Independence
