= Kambja =

Borough in Estonia

- Small borough
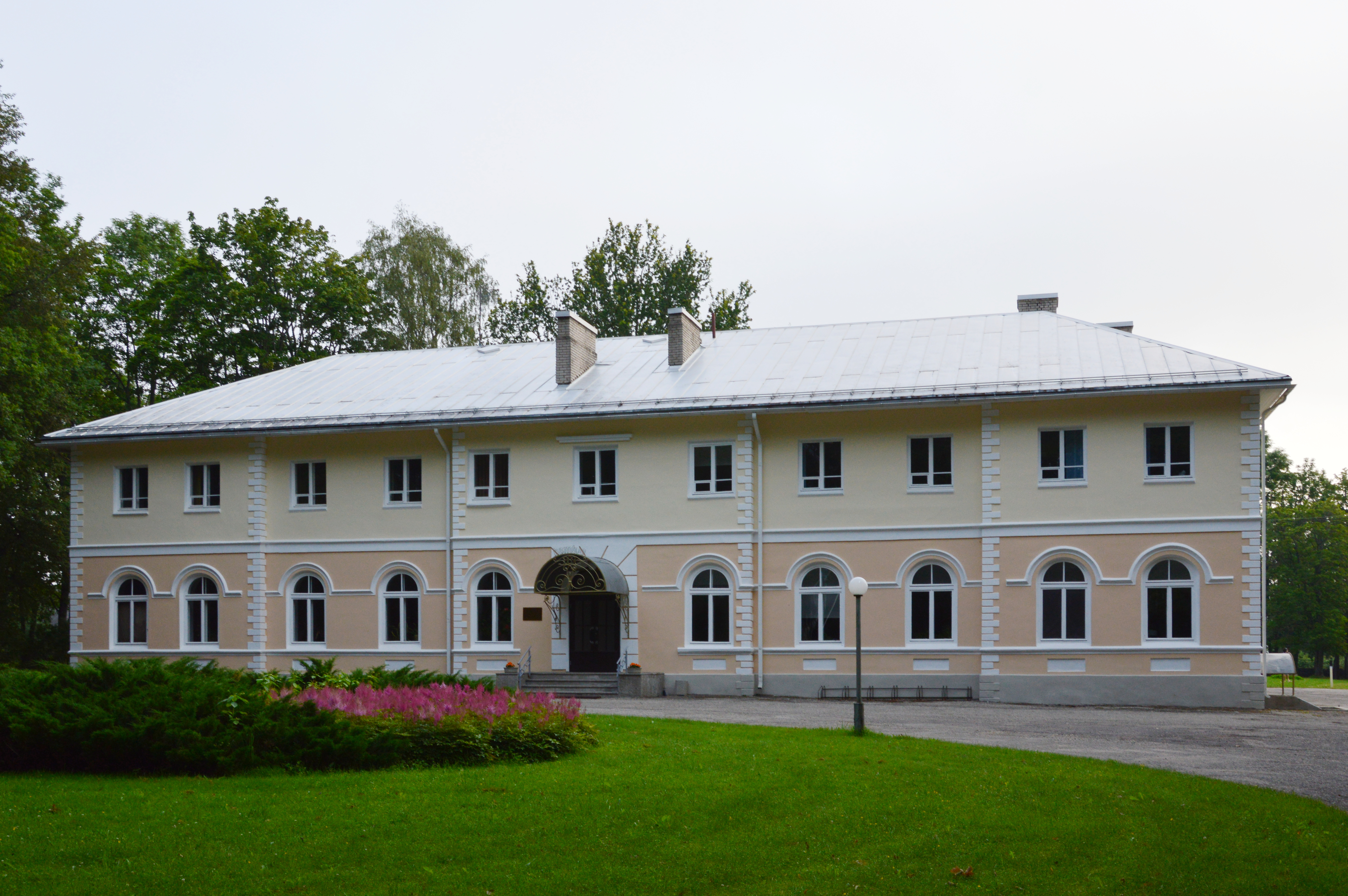
- Vastse-Kambja manor house, now housing the Kambja local government

- Location within Estonia
- Coordinates: 58°14′3″N 26°41′35″E
- Country: Estonia
- County: Tartu
- Parish: Kambja
- Time zone: UTC+2 (EET)
  - Summer (DST): UTC+3 (EEST)

Kambja (German: Kamby) is a small borough (Estonian: alevik) in Tartu County, Estonia. It is the administrative centre of Kambja Parish.

Earlier there was located Vastse-Kambja manor (Neu-Kamby).

== St. Martin's Church ==
Kambja Church burned down several times, but was always rebuilt. The first mention of Kambja and the church at its present location dates to as early as 1330. After the first fire in 1558, it took 84 years to rebuild the church. Again was it destroyed in 1704 during the Great Northern War. Renovation were finished in 1721 and those walls are the basis for the present building. In 1874 an extension was built; there were ten thousand members in the parish around that time. In 1937 a new northern tower with staircases was built.

During World War II, on 19 August 1944, the church was bombed by the invading Russian troops. The new Soviet regime did not allow the church to be rebuilt, and the congregation was forced to close. The church remained in ruins until 1987, when the times started to change and on the initiative of Ivar Tedrema, the state farm director at that time, and with the help of school principal Madis Linnamägi, Toivo Traksmaa and many others, the renovation began. The Lutheran congregation was re-established in 1994.

== Notable people ==
Notable people that were born or lived in Kambja include the following:

- Felix Johannes Oinas (1911–2004), folklorist, linguist, and translator

== Gallery ==
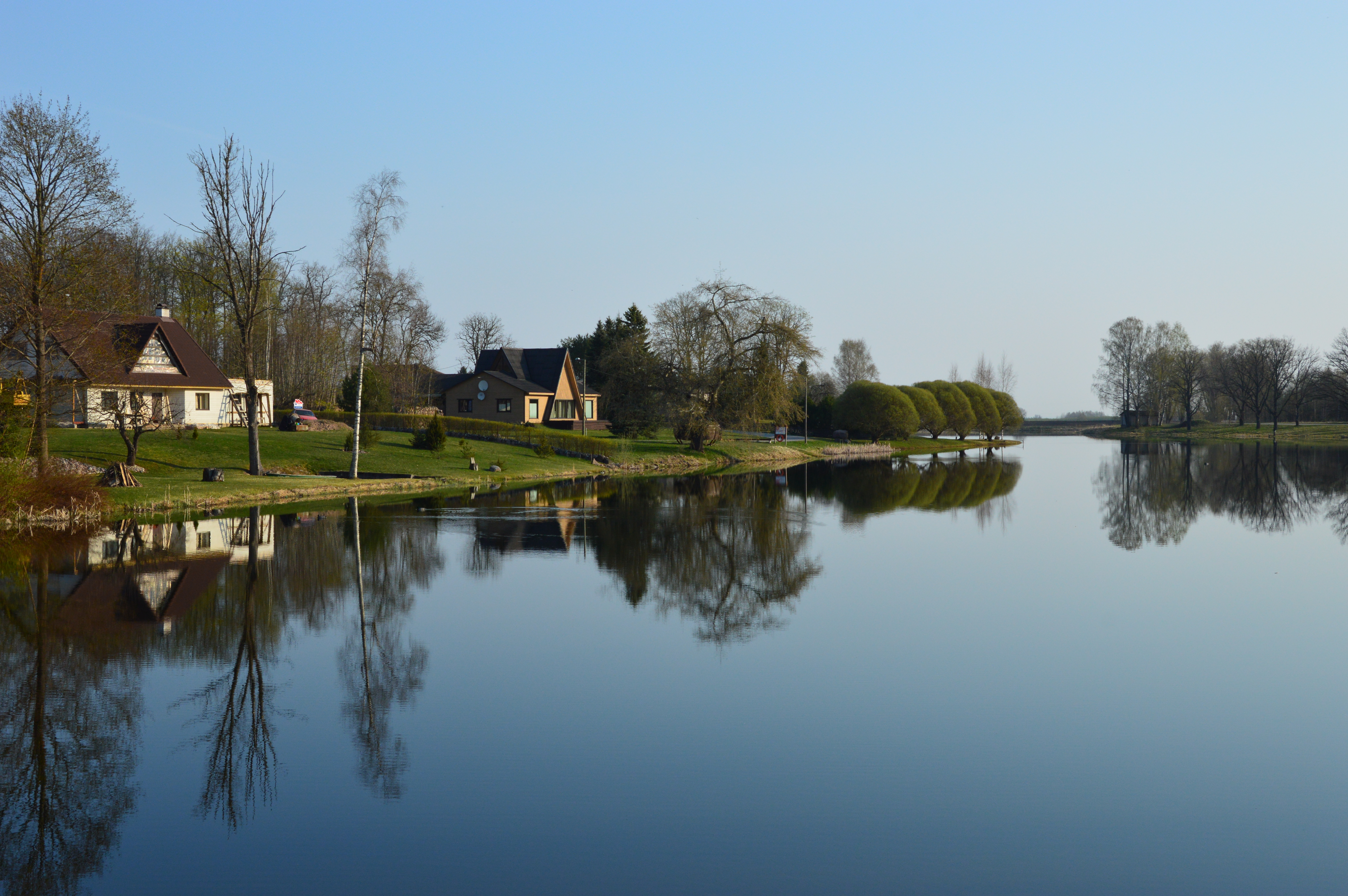
Village and lake

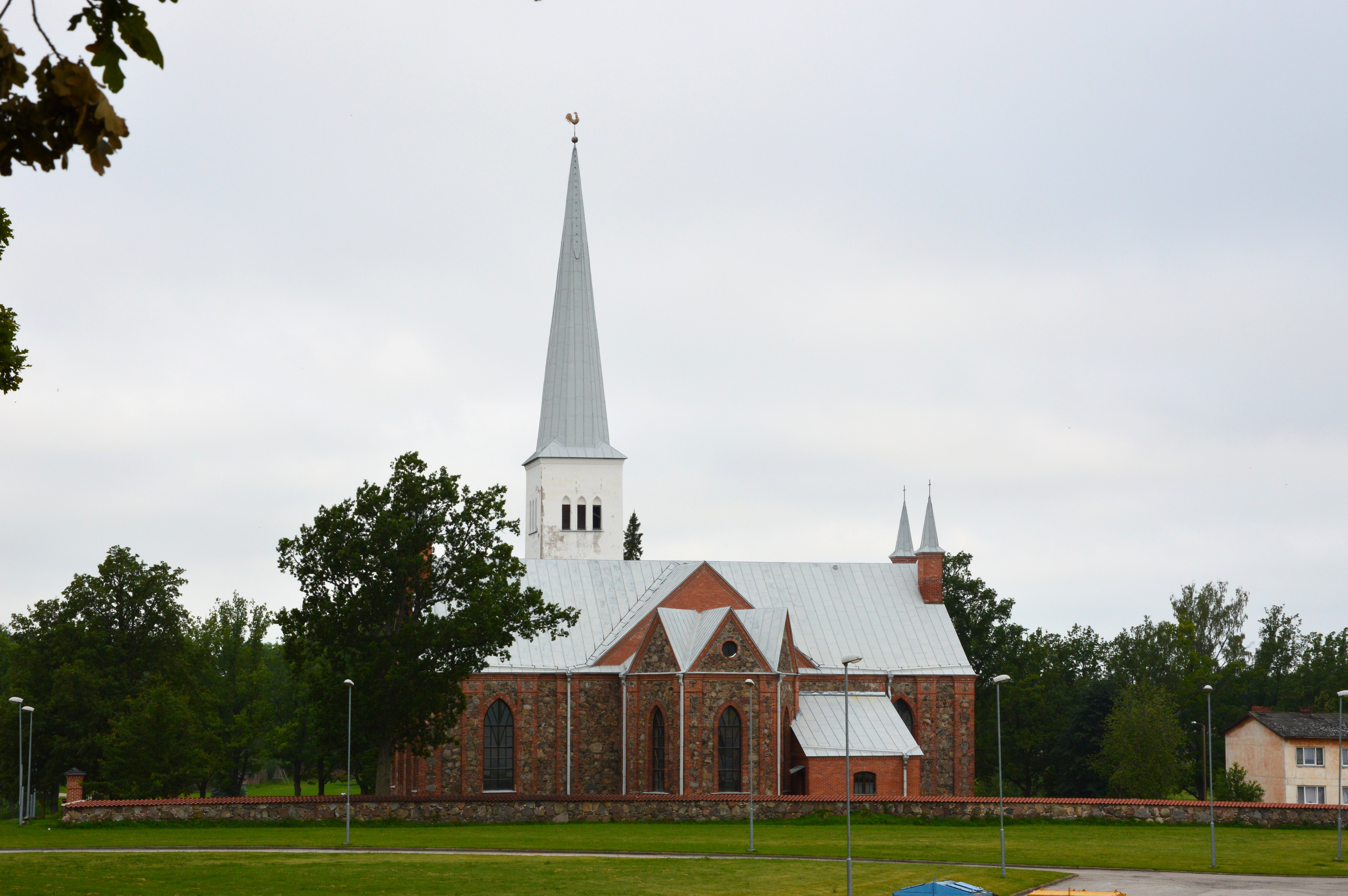
Church

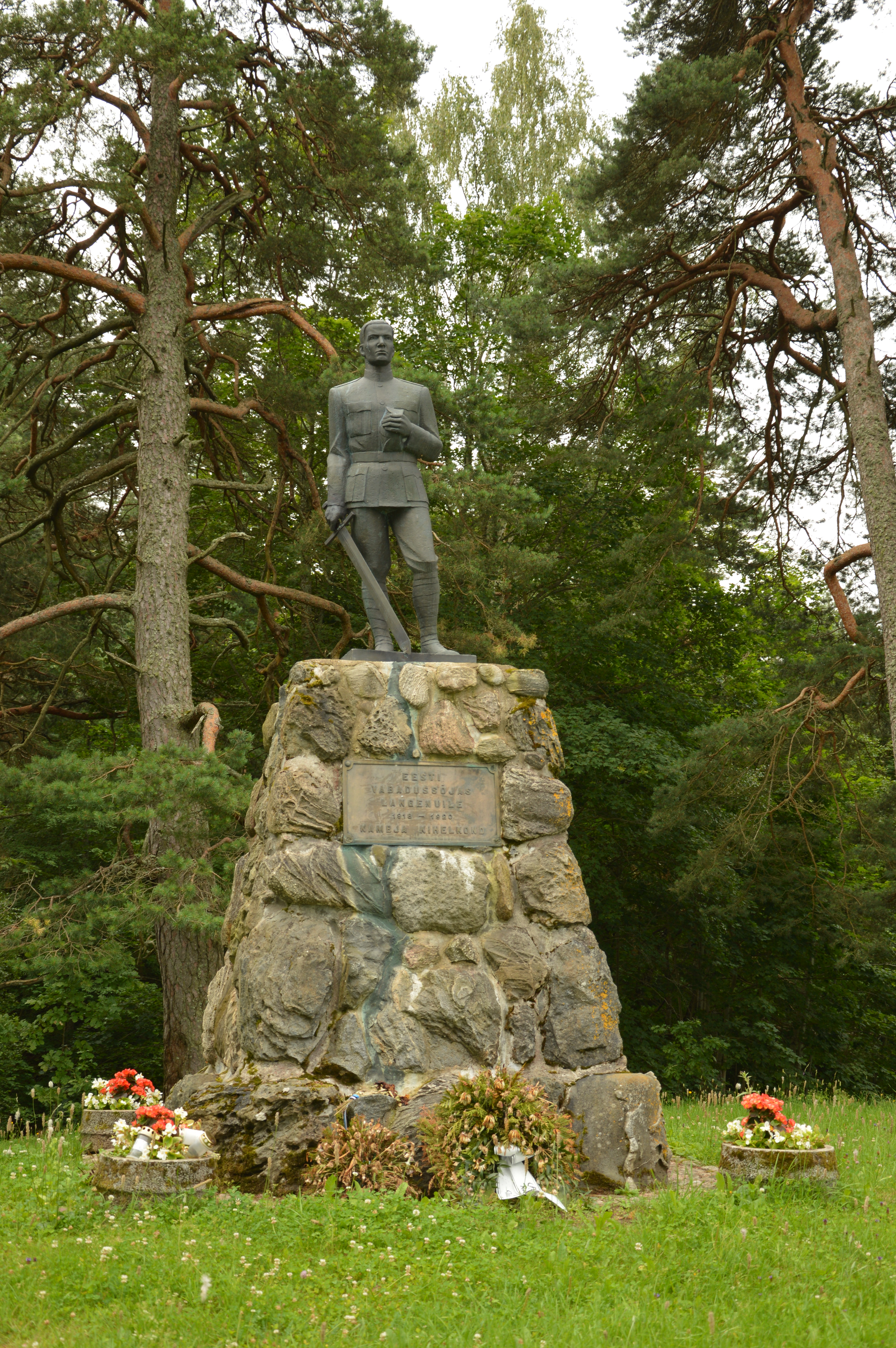
Monument to the Estonian War of Independence

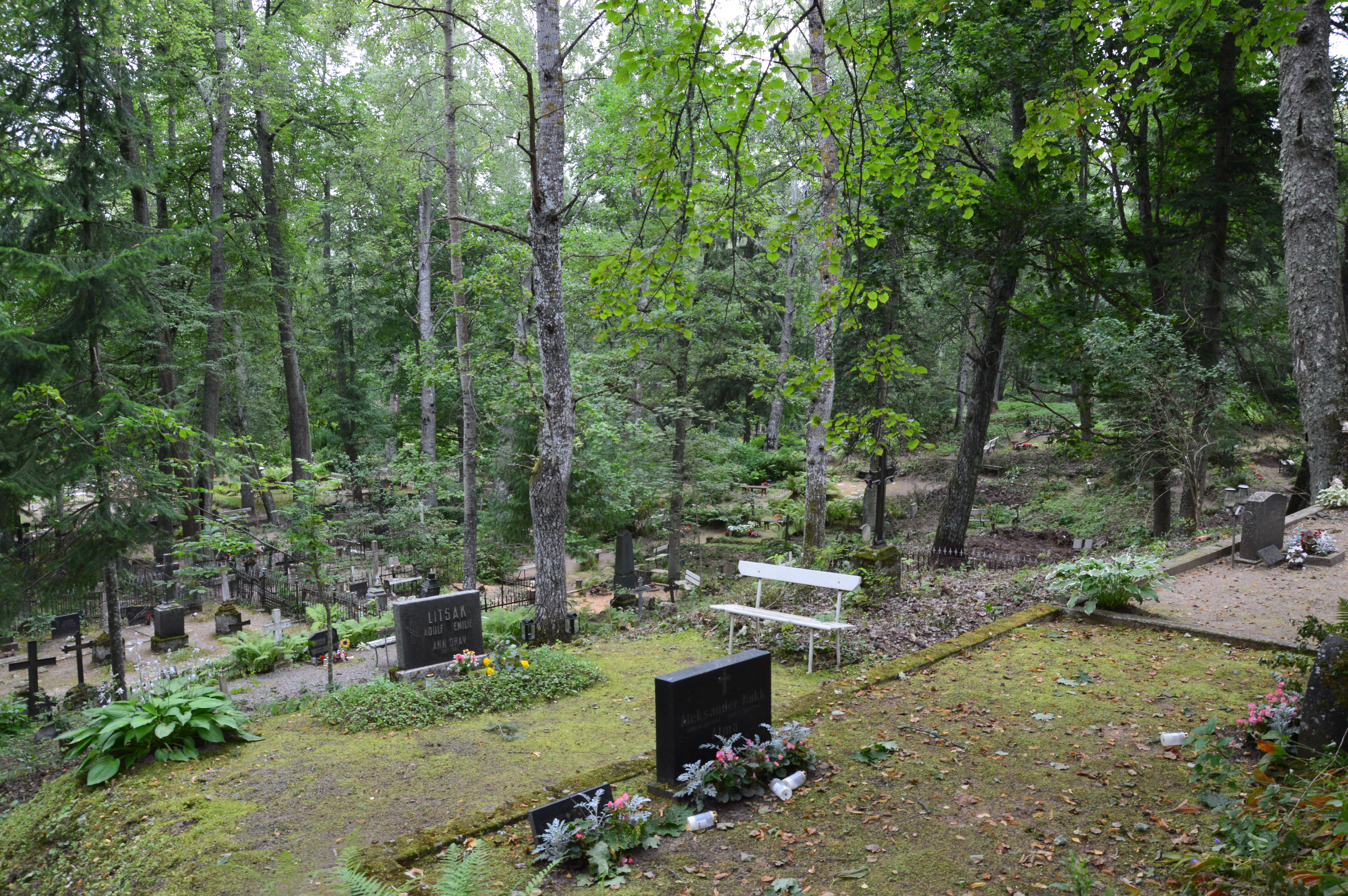
Cemetery

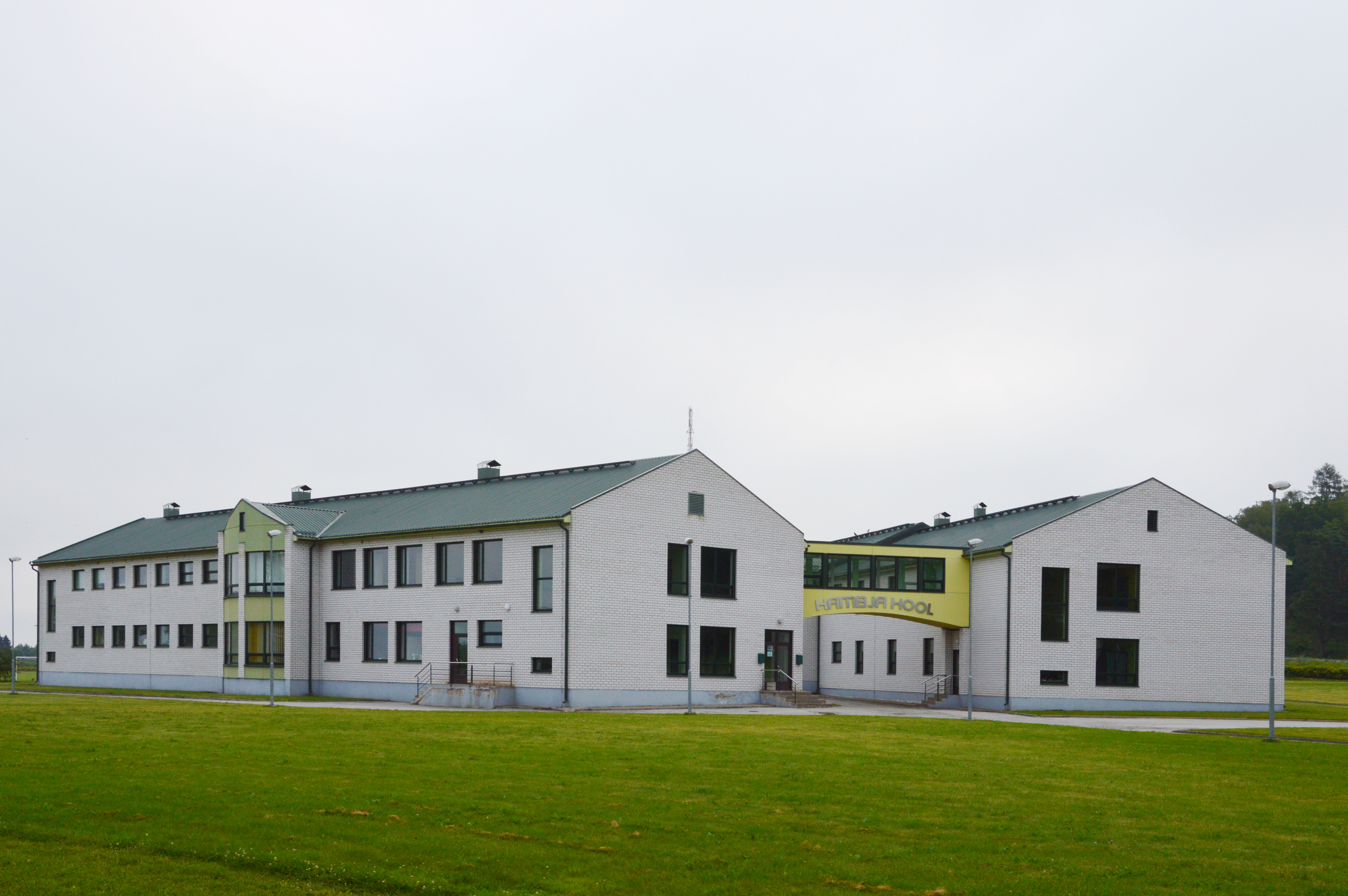
School

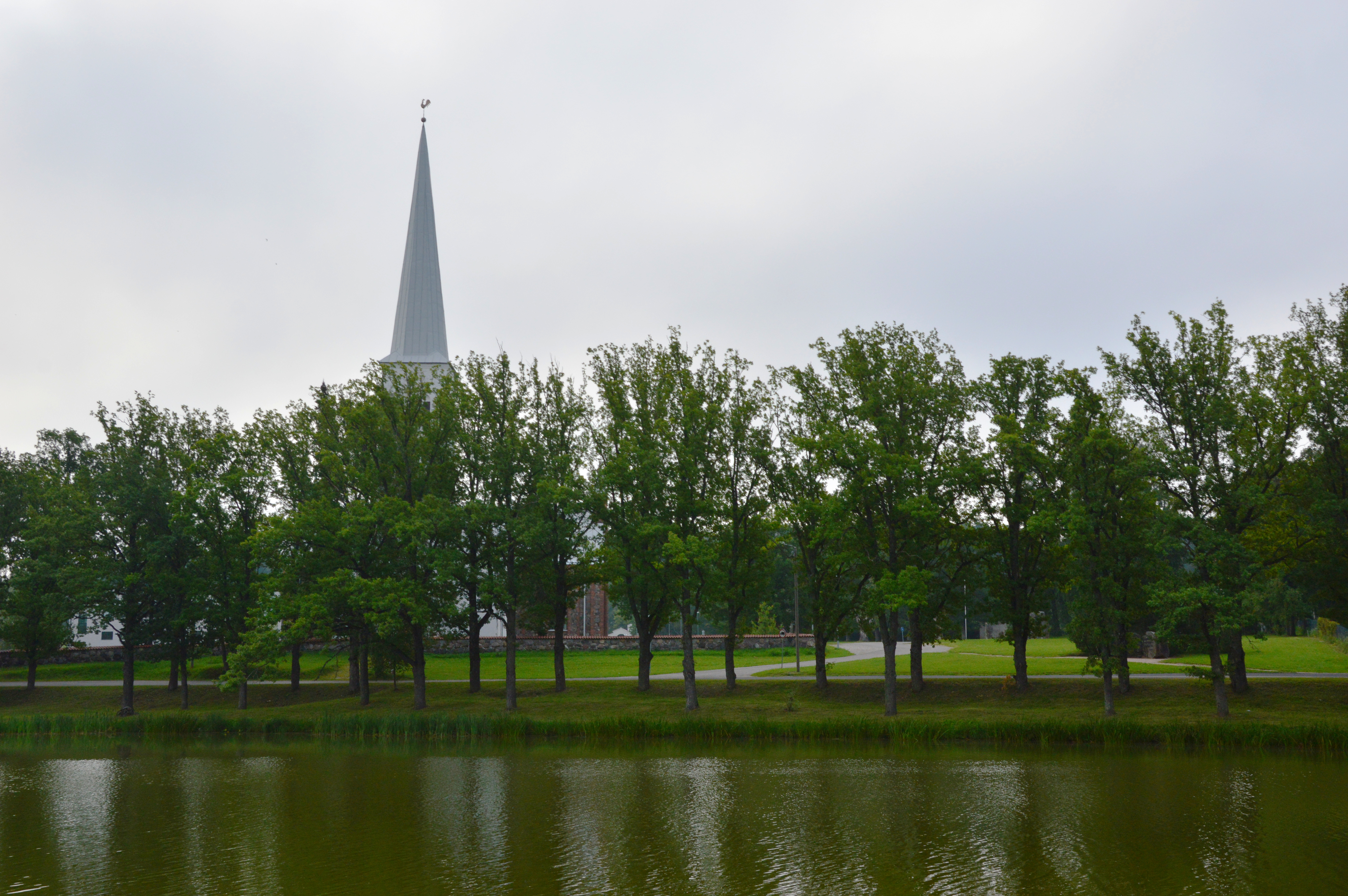
Lake

== See also ==
- SK 10 Premium Tartu
