= Kuperjanov Infantry Battalion =

Estonian military unit

- Kuperjanovi jalaväepataljon
- Insignia of the Kuperjanov Infantry Battalion
- Active: 1918–1940; 1992–present
- Country: Estonia
- Branch: Estonian Land Forces
- Type: Motorized infantry
- Size: Battalion
- Part of: 2nd Infantry Brigade
- Garrison/HQ: Taara Army Base
- Nicknames: Kupp; Kuperjanovlased ("Kuperjanovans"); Partisanid ("Partisans"); Surnupealuu sõdurid ("Soldiers of the skull")
- Anniversaries: 23 December; 18 March
- Engagements: Estonian War of Independence: Battle of Tartu; Battle of Paju; Battle of Cēsis; Krasnaya Gorka operation

Commanders
- Current commander: Lieutenant colonel Lauri Teppo
- Notable commanders: Julius Kuperjanov

The Kuperjanov Infantry Battalion (Estonian: Kuperjanovi jalaväepataljon) is a battalion of the Estonian Land Forces. It is a part of the 2nd Infantry Brigade. Battalion headquarters is at Taara Army Base, Võru.

== History ==
=== Estonian War of Independence ===
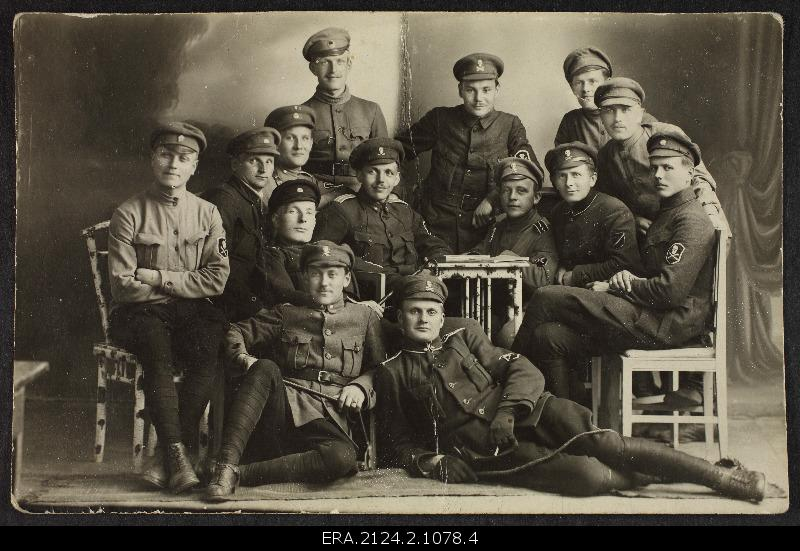
Officers of the Kuperjanov Infantry Battalion in Võru

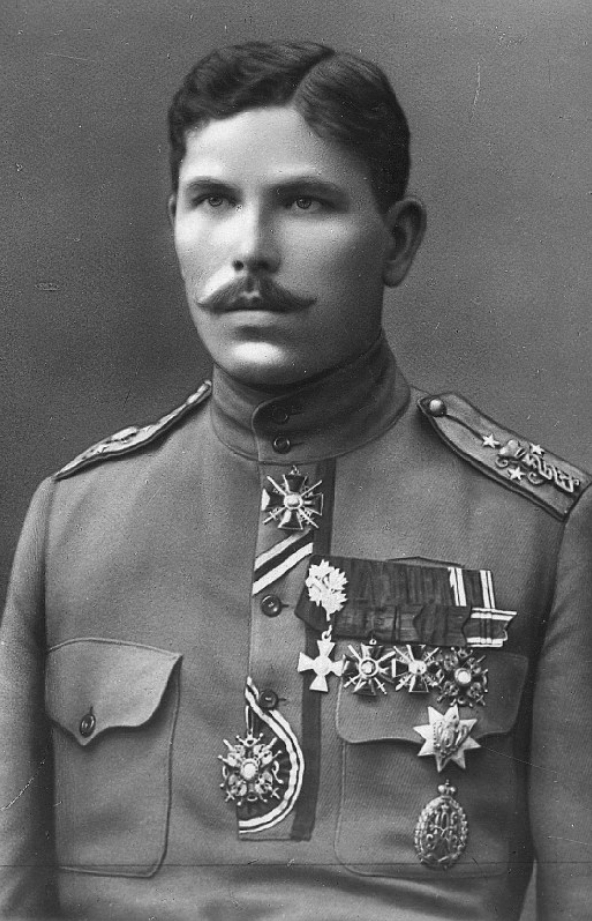
Julius Kuperjanov, founder and commander of the battalion

Julius Kuperjanov was a school teacher who was commissioned into the Imperial Russian Army during World War I and served as a commander of partisan and reconnaissance units. In 1918, he joined the Estonian Army at the beginning of the Estonian War of Independence. On 23 December 1918, Kuperjanov received permission from Colonel Ernst Limberg, commander of the 2nd Division, to form a special purpose partisan unit.

Kuperjanov's unit initially consisted of 37 volunteers and was based at Puurmani manor. New volunteers continued to arrive and the unit soon grew to 600 troops, becoming Tartumaa Partisan Battalion. On 13–14 January 1919, the battalion took part in liberating Tartu from the Red Army. After taking back Tartu, the battalion began moving south towards Valga. On 30 January 1919, the battalion reached Paju manor, where they met strong resistance from the Red Army. Tartumaa Partisan Battalion won the ensuing Battle of Paju, but Kuperjanov was badly wounded during the battle and died shortly after on 2 February 1919. Following his death, the battalion was renamed Kuperjanov Partisan Battalion in his honour.

Having liberated Southern Estonia from the Soviets, the battalion moved south into Latvia against the Baltische Landeswehr. On 25 May 1919, the battalion successfully stopped the German advance at Rauna, and took part in defeating the German forces in the Battle of Cēsis. On 30 September 1919, Kuperjanov Partisan Battalion took part in the unsuccessful attack against the Krasnaya Gorka fort. In November 1919, the unit became Kuperjanov Partisan Regiment.

=== 1992–present ===
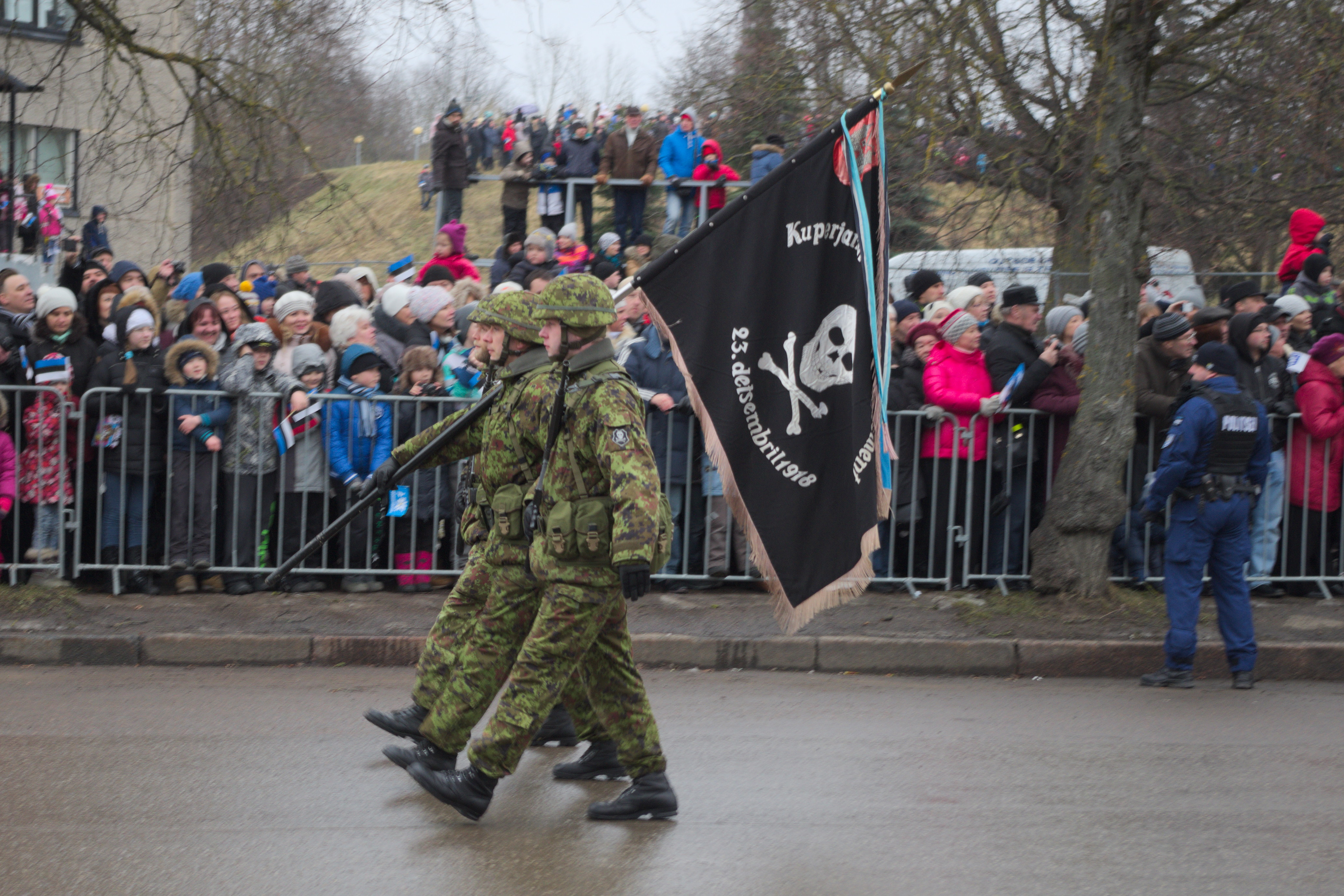
Kuperjanov Infantry Battalion colour guards on the Independence Day parade in 2015

The unit was reconstituted as the Kuperjanov Single Infantry Battalion on 18 March 1992. Based at the Taara Army Base in Võru, it was the largest and the most capable battalion in the Estonian Land Forces, known for its strict rules and esprit de corps. In 2004, the Ministry of Defence transformed the battalion into an infantry training unit. On 1 January 2009, the battalion was renamed Kuperjanov Infantry Battalion. It currently forms the core of the 2nd Infantry Brigade which is the principle force being raised in what used to be called the Southern Defence District.

== Current structure ==
Kuperjanov Infantry Battalion:

- Battalion Headquarters
  - A - Infantry Company
  - B - Infantry Company
  - C - Infantry Company
  - D - Intantry Company
  - Combat Support company
  - Staff and support company

== See also ==
- 2nd Infantry Brigade
