= Trolla (disambiguation) =

Trolla may refer to:

== Places ==
- Trolla, a village in Trondheim Municipality, Sør-Trøndelag county, Norway
- Trolla, Estonia, a village in Võru County, Estonia
- Trolla (mountain), a mountain in Sunndal Municipality, Møre og Romsdal county, Norway

== People ==
- Heiki Trolla, an Estonian artist better known as Navitrolla
