= Võro Institute =

Research institute in Estonia, focusing on Võru-language culture

Coordinates: 57.845482°N 26.992319°E

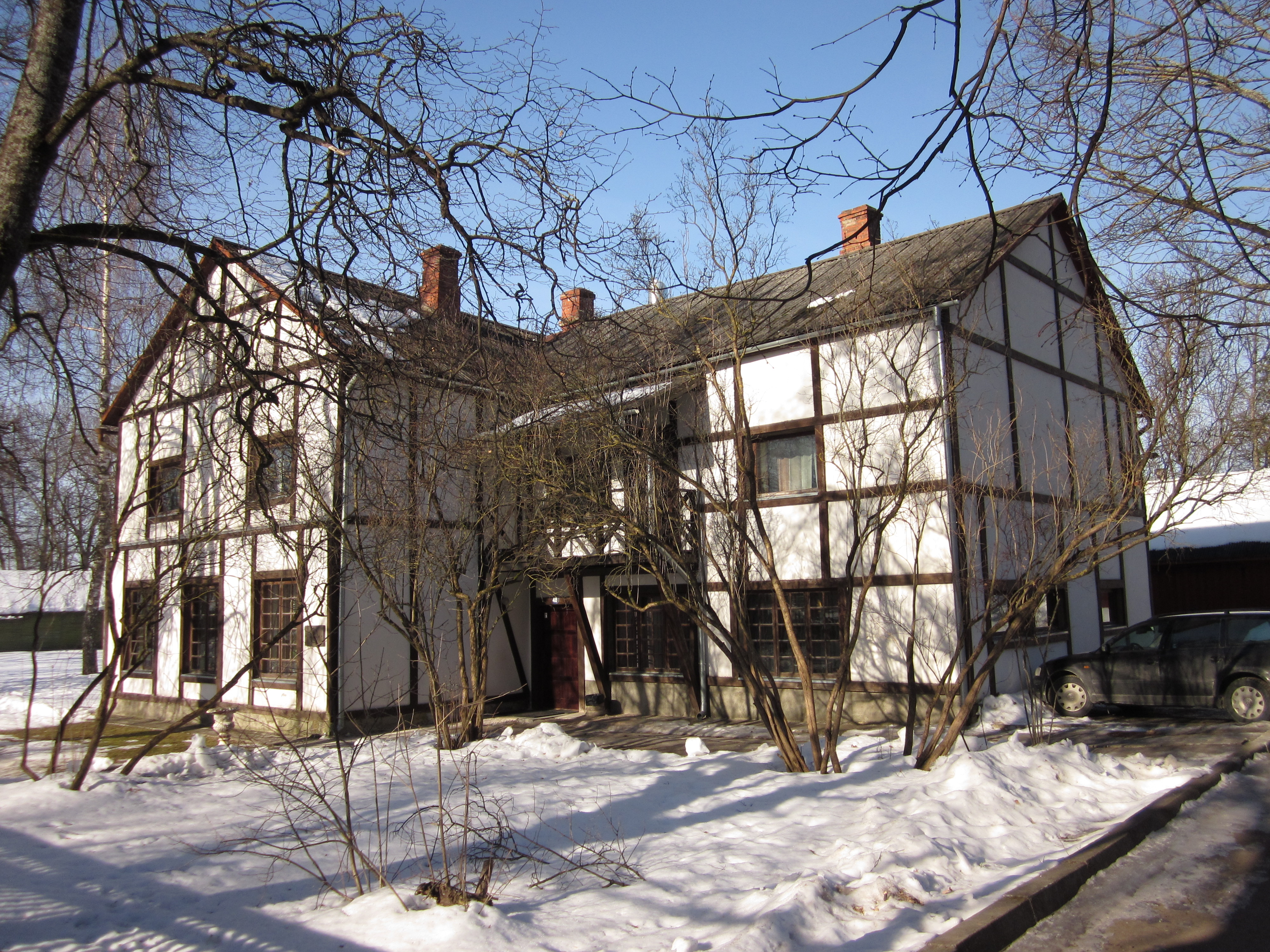
Võro Institute building in 2011.

Võro Institute (Võro: Võro Instituut, Estonian: Võru Instituut) is an Estonian state research and development institution dedicated to the preservation and promotion of the Võro language and culture. It is managed by the Estonian Ministry of Culture.

== History ==
Jaan Pulk (Pulga Jaan), a native Võro speaker

Võro (Võro: võro kiil' [ˈvɤro kʲiːlʲ], Estonian: võru keel) is a language belonging to the Finnic branch of the Uralic languages. Traditionally, it has been considered a dialect of the South Estonian dialect group of the Estonian language, but nowadays it has its own literary language and is in search of official recognition as an autochthonous regional language of Estonia. Võro has roughly 75,000 speakers (Võros) mostly in southeastern Estonia, in the eight parishes of the historical Võru County (Karula, Harglõ, Urvastõ, Rõugõ, Kanepi, Põlva, Räpinä, Vahtsõliina) and the rest of Estonia.

The institute was founded by the Estonian government in 1995 and is located in the Southern Estonian town of Võru. The directors of the institute have been Enn Kasak, Kaido Kama and Külli Eichenbaum. The present director of the institute is Rainer Kuuba. Researchers at the institute include the toponymist Evar Saar and the lexicographer Sulev Iva.

== Activities ==
The institute is engaged in a wide range of activities to meet the challenges facing lesser-spoken languages, including establishing school programs, conducting linguistic and regional research, preserving place-names and their corresponding stories (mostly by Evar Saar), publishing Võro-language scholarship and school textbooks, and organizing annual language conferences. The aim of these activities is to encourage the Võro people to speak their own language and to preserve their characteristic life-style.

One of the institute’s stated objectives is to standardize Southern Estonian for public and official use. It is considered a semi-official regulating body for Southern Estonian orthography.

The institute also manages a number of museums across the historic Võrumaa region.
