= Navitrolla =

Estonian painter

Heiki Trolla (born 10 August 1970), better known by his artist name Navitrolla, is an Estonian painter whose work has been described as naivist or surrealist. Most of his works depict fantastic landscapes and animals.

Pukk was born in Võru. He spent his childhood in the villages of Trolla and Navi near Võru, which is the source of his pseudonym.

He works in his atelier in Tartu, but he has a gallery in Tallinn.

Navitrolla's uncle is the philosopher of science Enn Kasak.

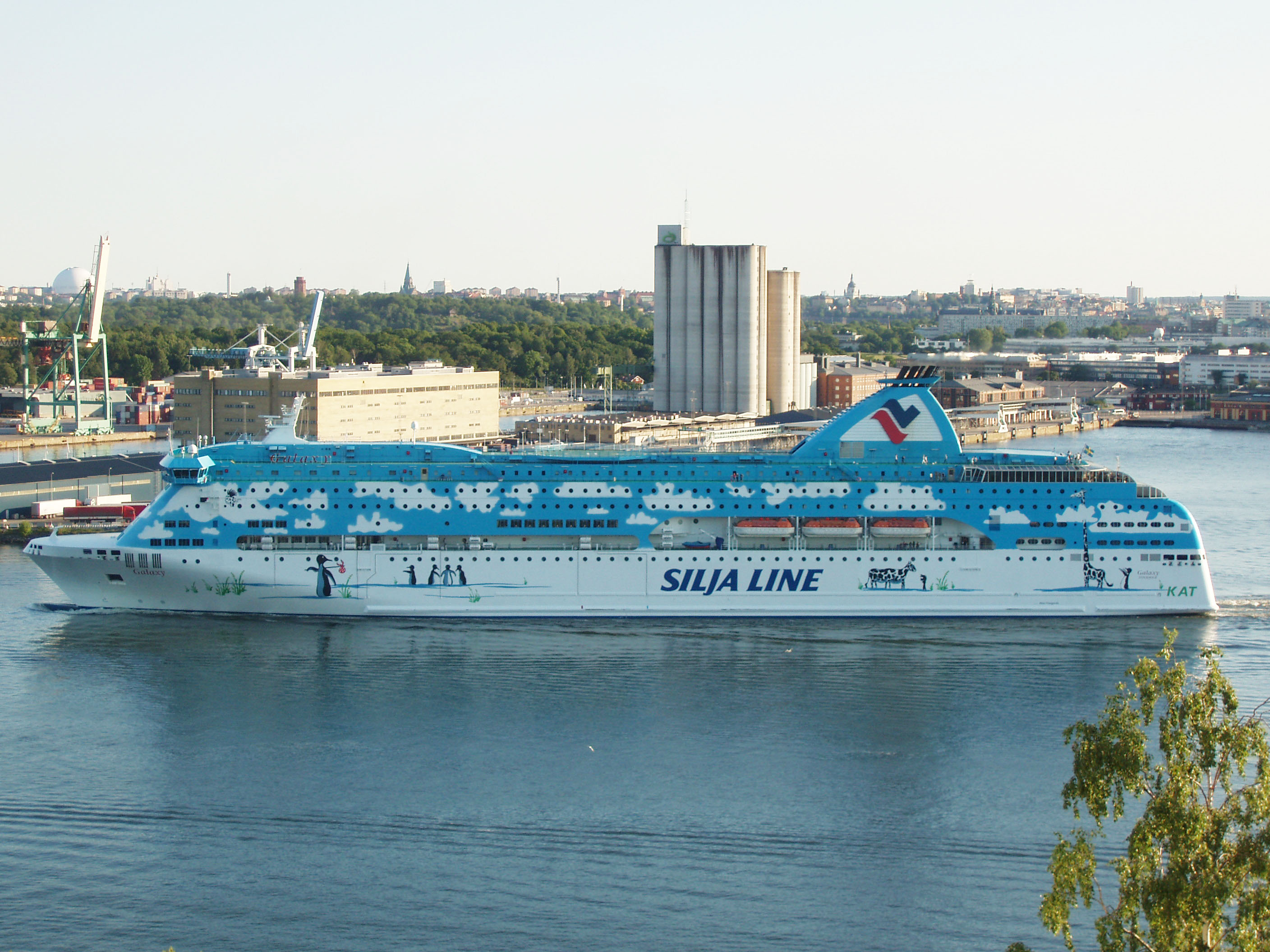
MS Galaxy's decorations designed by Navitrolla
