= Ranked list of Estonian counties =

Counties of Estonia

== By population ==
as of 1 January 2024

Rank	County	Population	%	Density
1	Harjumaa	646,315	47.0%	149.1
2	Tartumaa	164,460	11.9%	54.9
3	Ida-Virumaa	132,286	9.6%	39.3
4	Pärnumaa	87,891	6.3%	18.2
5	Lääne-Virumaa	59,536	4.3%	17.1
6	Viljandimaa	45,543	3.3%	13.3
7	Raplamaa	34,246	2.4%	11.4
8	Võrumaa	34,049	2.4%	14.7
9	Saaremaa	32,021	2.3%	10.9
10	Järvamaa	30,084	2.1%	11.4
11	Valgamaa	27,924	2.0%	13.6
12	Jõgevamaa	27,397	1.9%	10.5
13	Põlvamaa	23,892	1.7%	11.0
14	Läänemaa	20,625	1.5%	8.6
15	Hiiumaa	8,418	0.6%	8.2
	Estonia	1,374,687	100%	30.3

== By area ==
Rank	County	Area (km&)	%	Density
1	Pärnumaa	4,807	10.9%	18.2
2	Harjumaa	4,333	9.8%	149.1
3	Lääne-Virumaa	3,465	7.8%	17.1
4	Viljandimaa	3,423	7.6%	13.3
5	Ida-Virumaa	3,364	7.6%	39.3
6	Tartumaa	2,993	7.0%	54.9
7	Raplamaa	2,980	6.8%	11.4
8	Saaremaa	2,922	6.6%	10.9
9	Järvamaa	2,623	5.9%	11.4
10	Jõgevamaa	2,604	5.9%	10.5
11	Läänemaa	2,383	5.4%	8.6
12	Võrumaa	2,305	5.2%	14.7
13	Põlvamaa	2,165	5.9%	11.0
14	Valgamaa	2,044	4.6%	13.6
15	Hiiumaa	1,023	2.3%	8.2
	Estonia	45,228	100%	30.3

== By density ==
Rank	County	Population	Area (km&)	Density
1	Harjumaa	646,315	4,333	1249.1
2	Ida-Virumaa	132,286	3,364	39.3
3	Tartumaa	164,460	2,993	54.9
4	Lääne-Virumaa	59,536	3,465	17.1
5	Pärnumaa	87,891	4,807	18.2
6	Valgamaa	27,924	2,044	13.6
7	Võrumaa	34,049	2,305	14.7
8	Viljandimaa	55,877	3,423	13.3
9	Järvamaa	30,084	2,623	11.4
10	Põlvamaa	23,892	2,165	11.0
11	Jõgevamaa	27,397	2,604	10.5
12	Raplamaa	34,246	2,980	11.4
13	Saaremaa	32,021	2,922	10.9
14	Läänemaa	20,625	2,383	8.6
15	Hiiumaa	8,418	1,023	8.2
	Estonia	1,374,687	45,228	30.3
