= Sibul =

Family name

Sibul is an Estonian language family name. The word literally means "onion". Sibul is also an Estonian ethnic slur for Russians.

The surname may refer to:

- Riho Sibul (1958–2022), Estonian musician
- Leon Sibul, Estonian-American professor
- Lembit Sibul, Estonian humorist
- Priit Sibul, Estonian politician
