= Sulev Iva =

Estonian writer

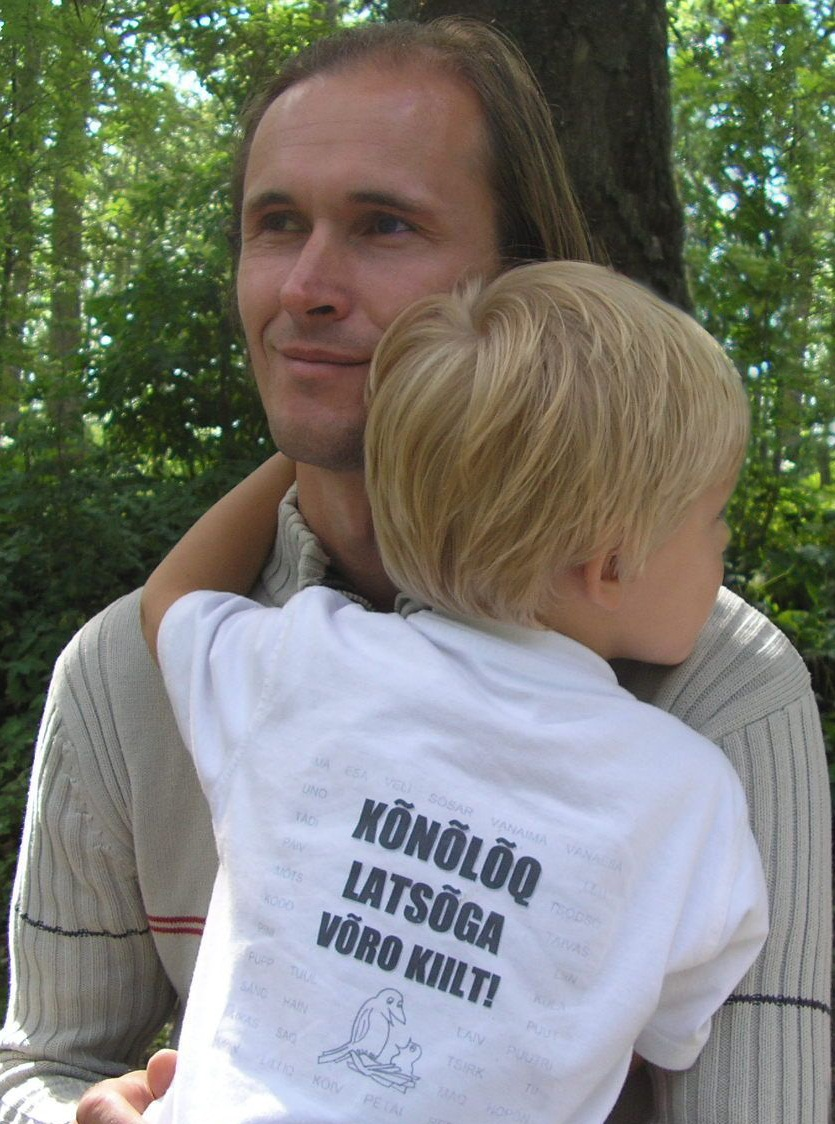
Sulev Iva (2006)

Sulev Iva (born 3 October 1969 in Võru), also known under the Võro-styled pen name of Jüvä Sullõv, is a Võro identity advocate, and a founding fellow at the Võro Institute. He has authored numerous subjects on Võro-related topics, and coauthored an ABC book and a reader of the Võro language for elementary school children.

== Works ==
- Iva, Sulev (2007): Võru kirjakeele sõnamuutmissüsteem (Inflectional Morphology in the Võro Literary Language). Dissertationes Philologiae Estonicae Universitatis Tartuensis 20, Tartu: Tartu Ülikooli Kirjastus
- Jüvä, Sullõv (2002): Võro-eesti synaraamat (Võro-Estonian dictionary). Publications of Võro Institute 12. Tarto-Võro.

== Sources ==
- Central Library of Võru County
- Võro Institute
