= Evar Saar =

Estonian linguist

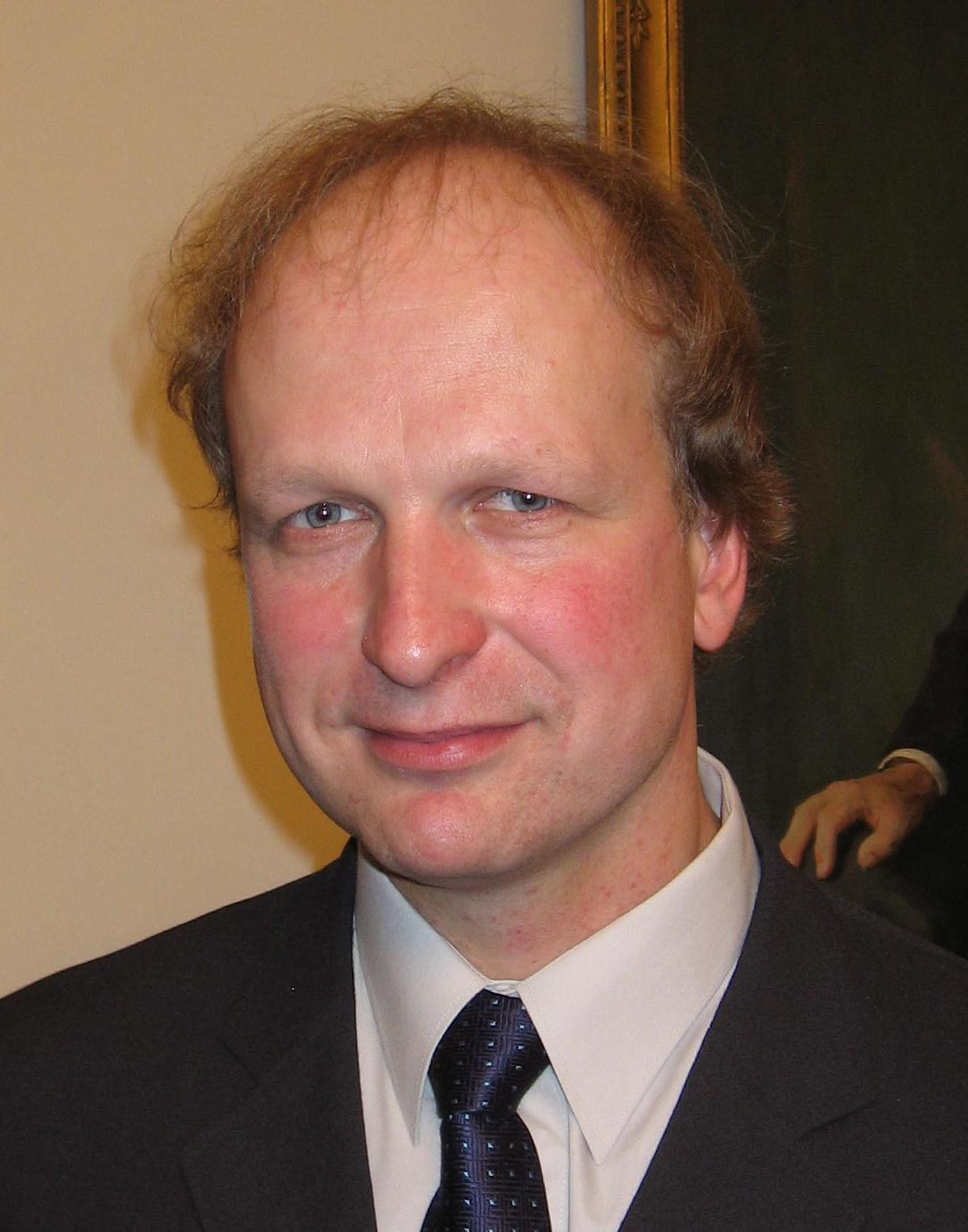
Evar Saar in 2008

Evar Saar (Võro: Saarõ Evar; born 16 August 1969) is an Estonian linguist, toponymist and Võro language activist.

He has traveled extensively around the historical county of Võrumaa and documented the original names of all major geographical features there. In total, he has collected over 50,000 names from the Võro language spoken in Southern Estonia.

== Works ==
- Võrumaa kohanimede analüüs enamlevinud nimeosade põhjal ja traditsioonilise kogukonna nimesüsteem. Dissertationes philologiae estonicae Universitatis Tartuensis, 1406–1325; 22, Tartu Ülikool 2008.
- Räpina ja Vastseliina kohanimed. Sünkrooniline ülevaade ja andmebaas. In: Mariko Faster ja Evar Saar. Võromaa kotussõnimmist, Võro Instituut 2002. (MA thesis: Local names of Räpina and Vastseliina. Synchronical overview and database)
- Eve Alender, Kairit Henno, Annika Hussar, Peeter Päll ja Evar Saar. Nimekorralduse analüüs, Eesti Keele Sihtasutus 2003. (Analysis of name planning)
