= Trolla, Estonia =

Village in Estonia

Trolla
- Village
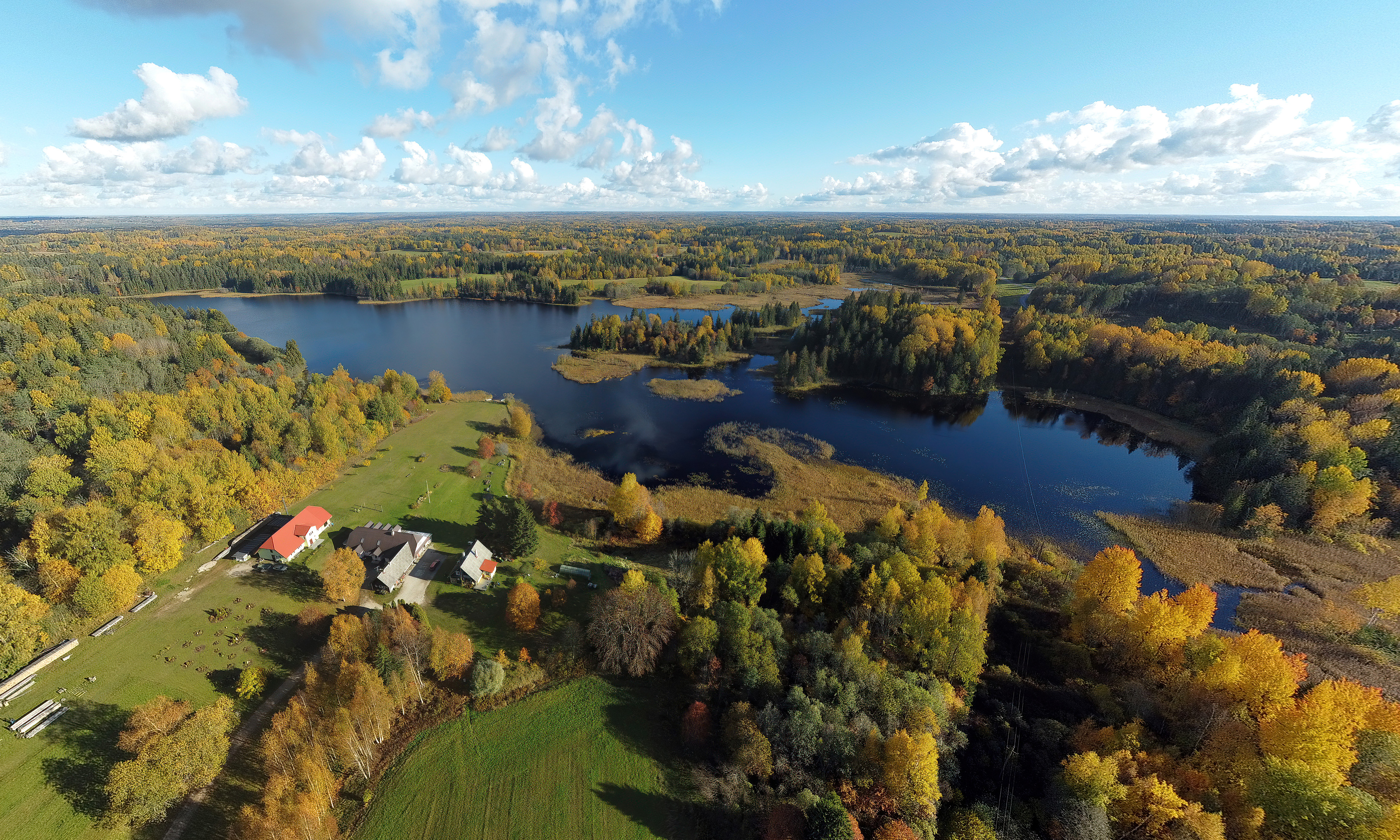
- Lake Vaskna in Trolla

- Location within Estonia
- Coordinates: 57.721111111111°N 27.082777777778°E
- Country: Estonia
- County: Võru County
- Parish: Rõuge Parish
- Time zone: UTC+2 (EET)
  - Summer (DST): UTC+3 (EEST)

Trolla is a village in Rõuge Parish, Võru County in Estonia.

The painter Navitrolla (Heiki Trolla) chose his artist name by merging the names of Trolla and Navi, which were both his childhood home villages.
