= Navi, Estonia =

Village in Estonia

Navi
- Village
- Location in Estonia
- Coordinates: 57°52′28″N 26°57′08″E
- Country: Estonia
- County: Võru County
- Municipality: Võru Parish

Population
  - Total: 263

Navi is a village in Võru Parish, Võru County in southeastern Estonia. It is located just northwest of the town Võru, north of the Tallinn–Tartu–Võru–Luhamaa road (E263). Navi has a population of 263.

== Notable people ==
- Enn Kasak (born 1954), philosopher of science; was born in Navi
- Navitrolla (Heiki Trolla; born 1970), painter; spent his childhood in Navi
- Ivari Padar (born 1965), politician; was born in Navi
