= Võru Folklore Festival =

Folk festival in Estonia

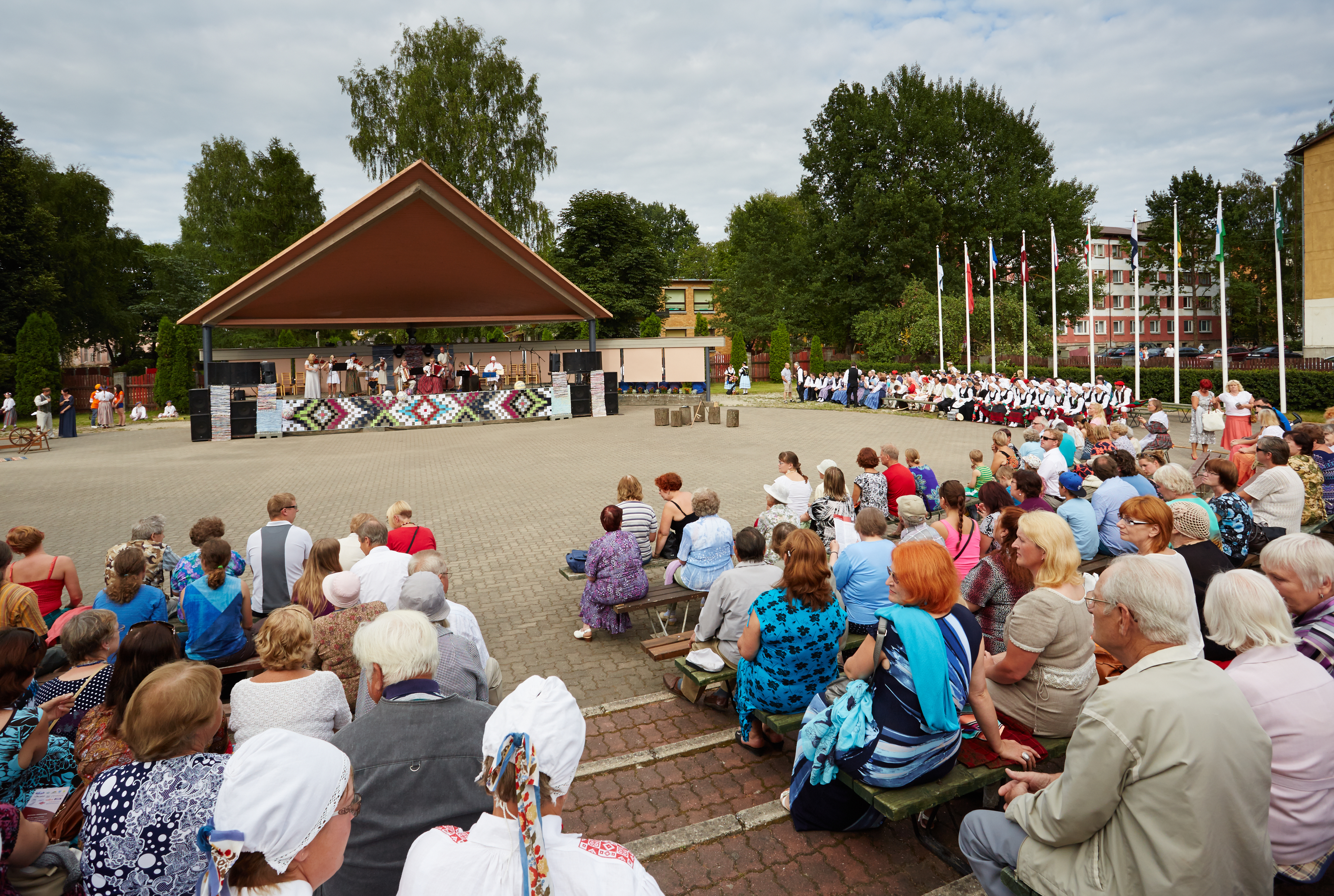
Võru Folklore Festival in 2014

Võru Folklore Festival (Estonian: Võru folkloorifestival) is an international festival which is focused on folklore-related activities and takes place annually in Võru, Estonia. This festival is the oldest and biggest annual folk festival in Estonia.

The first festival took place in 1995.

Every year, about 10,000 people visit the festival.

The festival belongs to the calendar of International Council of Organizations of Folklore Festivals and Folk Arts.
