= Võru railway station =

Former railway station in Estonia

Coordinates: 57°49′38″N 27°01′24″E

Võru
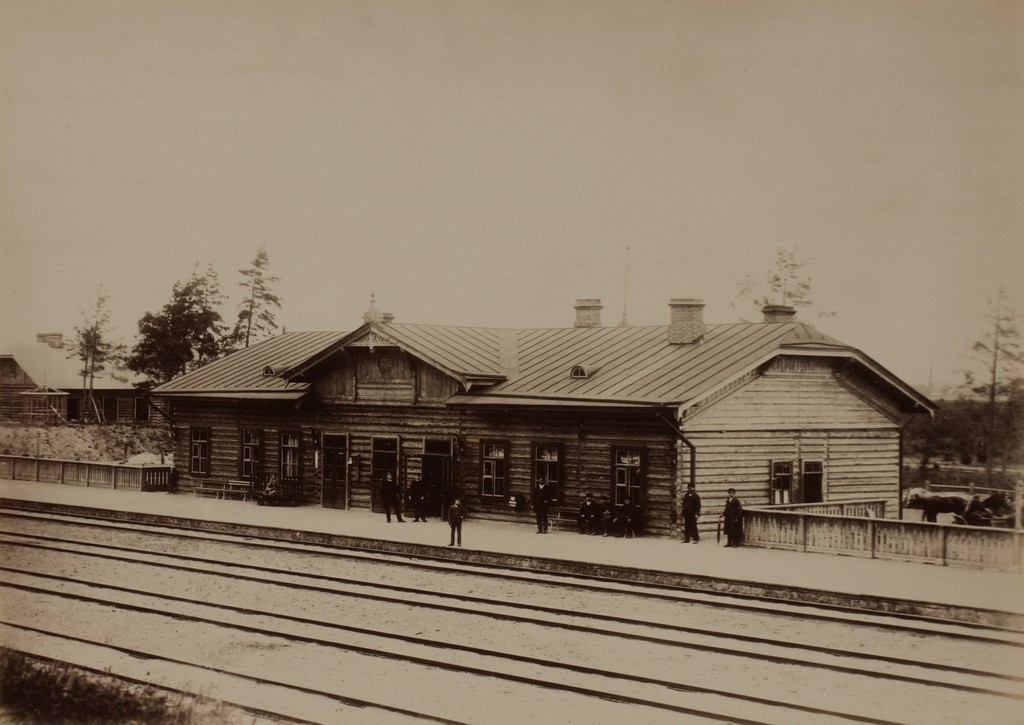
- View of the station in 1890

General information
- Location: Võru, Võru County; Estonia
- System: railway station

History
- Opened: 1889
- Closed: 2001
Location
- Location within Estonia

Võru railway station (Estonian: Võru raudteejaam) is a now closed train station located in Võru, Estonia.

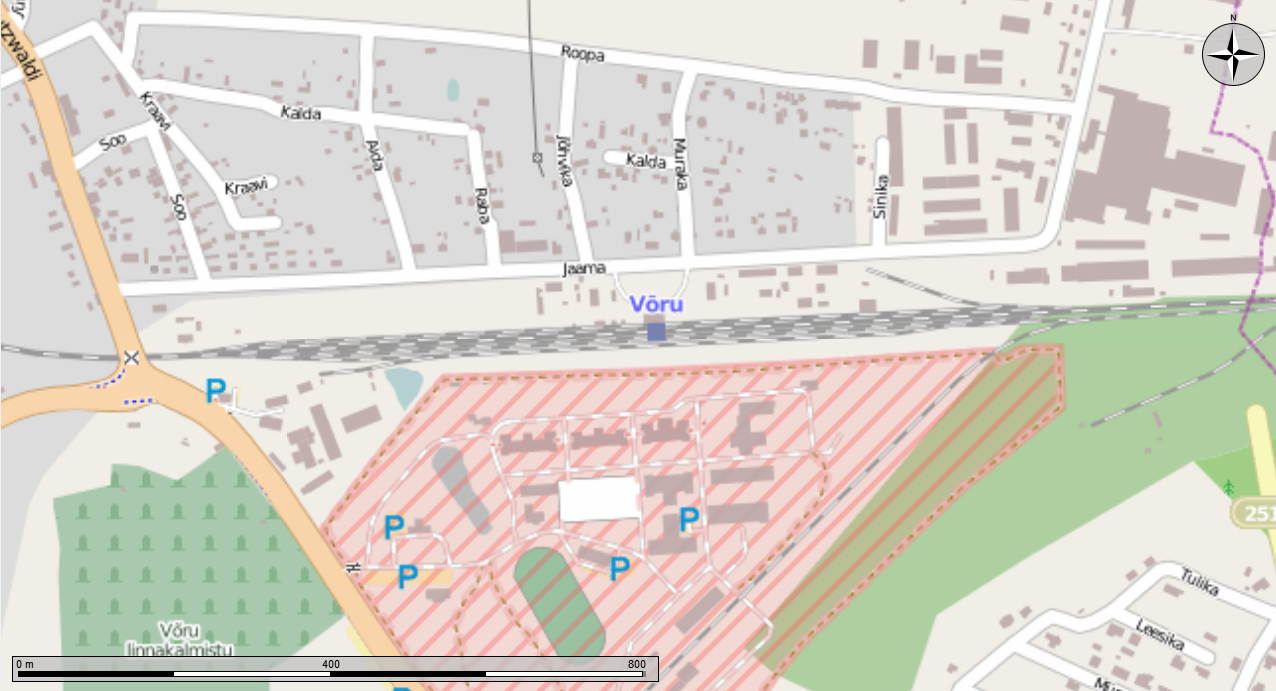
Map of the station near the center of the image.

There is no passenger rail service to the station as of March 2001. There was hope of having passenger trains stop at the station, but in 2010, the Estonian railways said they were not interested. Regardless, the station would have to be upgraded to meet current standards; it sits in disrepair with the windows boarded up. In 2015, a project by Estonian director Anna Hints consisting of interviews with survivors of the Soviet deportations was installed in the station as part of Estonia's Kilometre of Sculpture festival.

== History ==
The station dates from the Tsarist era. It is recognized as an historic structure by the Estonian government, with ID #1829 in the National Register of Cultural Monuments.

A granite memorial plaque at the station commemorates the deportation by train of Estonian residents in June 1941 (as part of the June deportation) and March 1949 (as part of Operation Priboi) that passed through the railway station heading to Siberia. It reads "Passers-by, remember!"

== See also ==
- List of railway stations in Estonia
- History of rail transport in Estonia
