= Enn Kasak =

Estonian philosopher and astrophysicist

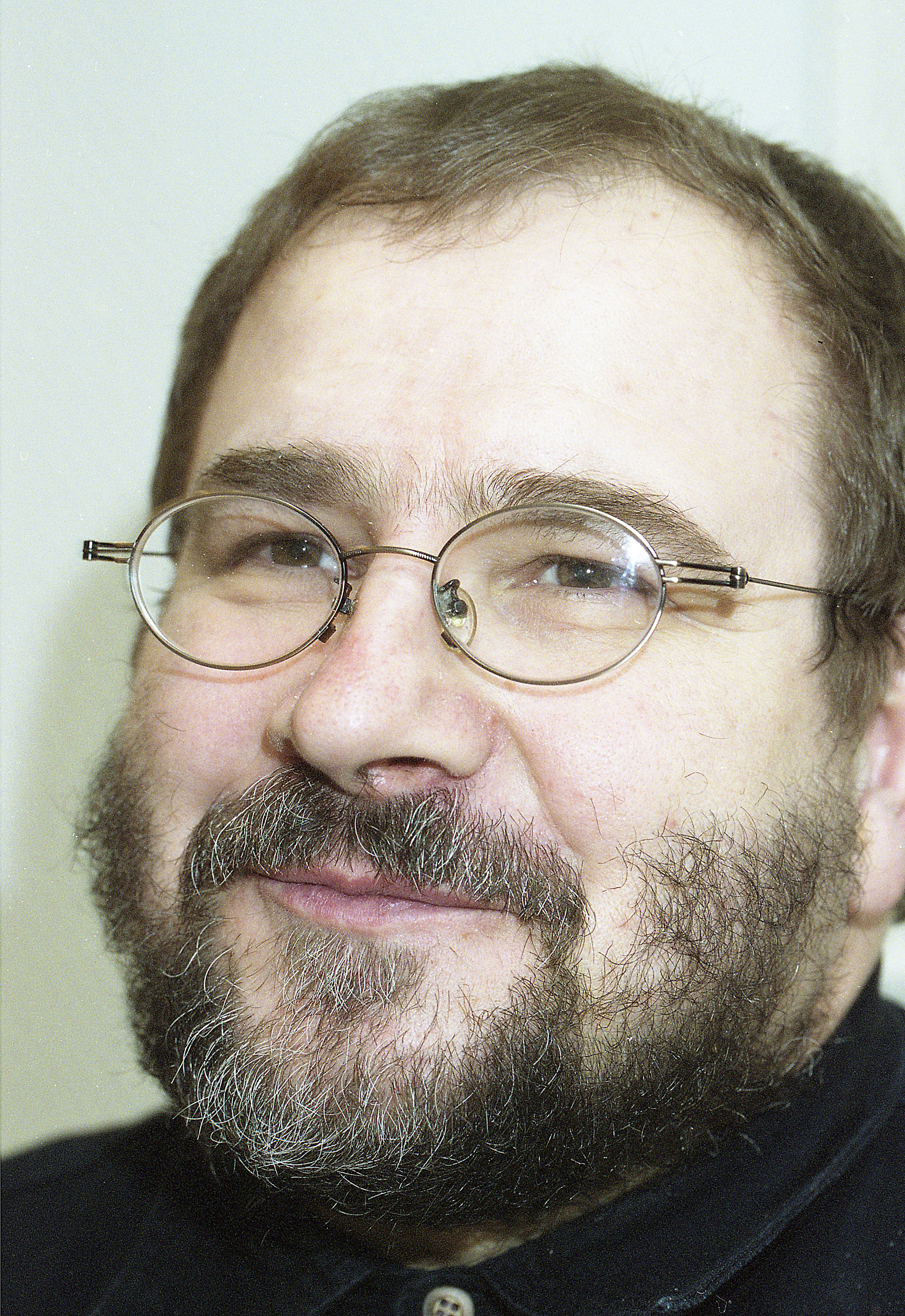
Enn Kasak in 2002

Enn Kasak (born on 24 September 1954 Navi, Võru County) is an Estonian philosopher and astrophysicist.

In 1981 he graduated from the University of Tartu with a degree in astrophysics. From 1981 to 1995 he worked at the Tõravere Observatory. From 1998 to 2007 he taught at Tallinn University. Since 2007 he has taught at the University of Tartu.

From 1995 to 1997 he was the head of Võro Institute.

In 2001 he received the Order of the White Star, medal class.

== Works ==
=== Fiction ===
- 2005: "Mu kadonu tii," Vikerkaar 7–8, pp. 97–100
- 2005: "Trooja hopõn," Vikerkaar 7–8, pp. 100–110
- 2008: "Partii," Võro-Seto tähtraamat, pp. 66–68. Võro: Võro Selts VKKF
- 2009: Vaba pattulangemise seadus (science fiction novel). Tallinn: Argo. ISBN 9789949438594

=== Non-Fiction ===
==== Books ====
- "Iidne tähetarkus" (2003; a history of ancient astronomy and astrology, including astral mythology)
- "Loogika alused" (2014; Foundations of Logic, a thorough overview of logic for university students)
- "Paradoksid: must auk mõtlemises" (2018; Paradoxes: a black hole in our thought, a treatise on philosophical paradoxes)
