= Leon Sibul =

Estonian-American acoustical engineer

Leon H. Sibul (August 30, 1932 – February 19, 2007) was with Pennsylvania State University’s Applied Research Laboratory from 1964 to 2002, where he retired as a senior scientist and professor of acoustics.

Leon Sibul was born in Võru, Estonia. In 1944 he fled his native country during the Russian occupation of Estonia, which lasted more than 50 years. He escaped to a refugee camp in Augsburg, Germany where he attended high school. In 1949, he emigrated to the U.S. and lived in the Washington, D.C., area. A veteran of the U.S. Air Force, he served from 1953 to 1957 as an electronic and radio technician.

After his military service, he attended George Washington University and graduated in 1960 with a Bachelor of Electrical engineering degree. From 1960 to 1964 he was employed at Bell Labs, working on an electronic switching system, as well as on Telstar, the communication satellite credited with ushering in the era of satellite communications.

He earned a Master in Electrical Engineering degree from New York University in 1963. In 1964 he started working for Pennsylvania State University’s Applied Research Laboratory, receiving his Ph.D. from Penn State in 1968. While at ARL he conducted fundamental and applied signal processing research and development for undersea weapons guidance and control, sonar systems and other Navy applications. He was a pioneer in applying signal processing to underwater systems’ guidance and control.

His publications included the textbook "Adaptive Signal Processing," author and co-author of 40 papers in refereed journals, six chapters in edited books, close to 100 conference presentations in his field and two U.S. patents. He was a life member of the Institute of Electrical and Electronics Engineers (IEEE), Society for Industrial and Applied Mathematics, Senior Member of Sigma Xi and a Fellow of the Acoustical Society of America.

In 1973, Sibul was elected commodore of the Nittany Valley Sailing Club. In 2003, the Penn State Sailing Club renamed their training grounds "The Sibul Sailing Center", after the long-time faculty adviser. (Sibul had been with the club since 1974.)
