= Lake Tamula =

Lake in Estonia

- Tamula järv (Estonian)
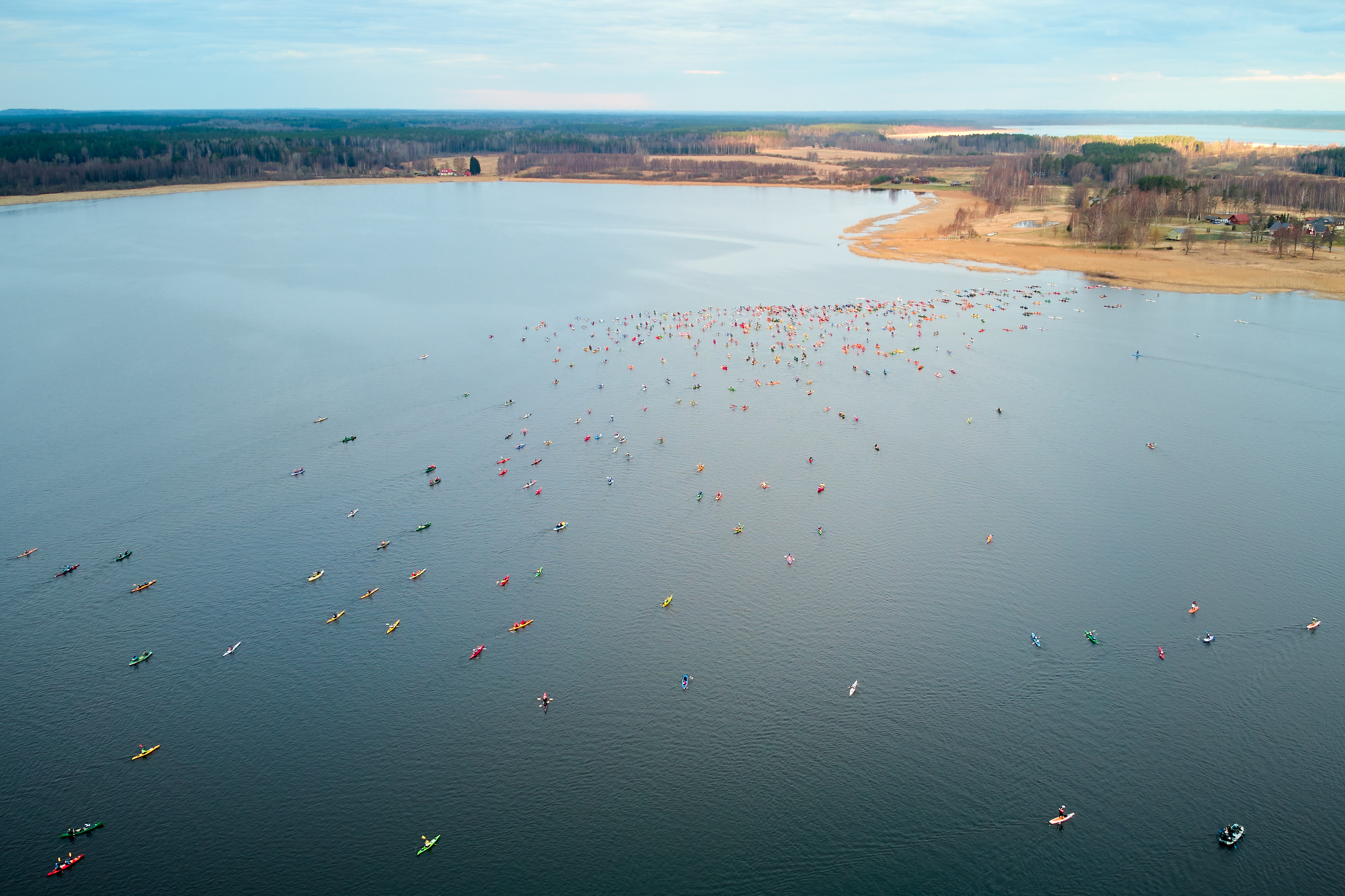

- Location within Estonia
- Location: Võru
- Coordinates: 57°50′23″N 26°59′13″E
- Primary inflows: Kubija Creek
- Primary outflows: Võhandu River
- Basin countries: Estonia
- Max. length: 2,190 meters (7,190 ft)
- Surface area: 217.5 hectares (537 acres)
- Average depth: 4.3 meters (14 ft)
- Max. depth: 7.7 meters (25 ft)
- Water volume: 9,285,000 cubic meters (327,900,000 cu ft)
- Shore length^{1}: 7,370 meters (24,180 ft)
- Surface elevation: 69.1 meters (227 ft)
- ^{1} Shore length is not a well-defined measure.

Lake Tamula (Estonian: Tamula järv) is a lake in southern Estonia. It is located on the southwestern side of the town of Võru in Võru Parish, Võru County.

== Physical description ==
The lake has an area of 217.5 hectares (537 acres). The lake has an average depth of 4.3 meters (14 ft) and a maximum depth of 7.7 meters (25 ft). It is 2,190 meters (7,190 ft) long, and its shoreline measures 7,370 meters (24,180 ft). It has a volume of 9,285,000 cubic meters (327,900,000 cu ft).

== History ==
On 11 September 2010, the Estonian shot putter Taavi Peetre drowned in Lake Tamula during a fishing trip.

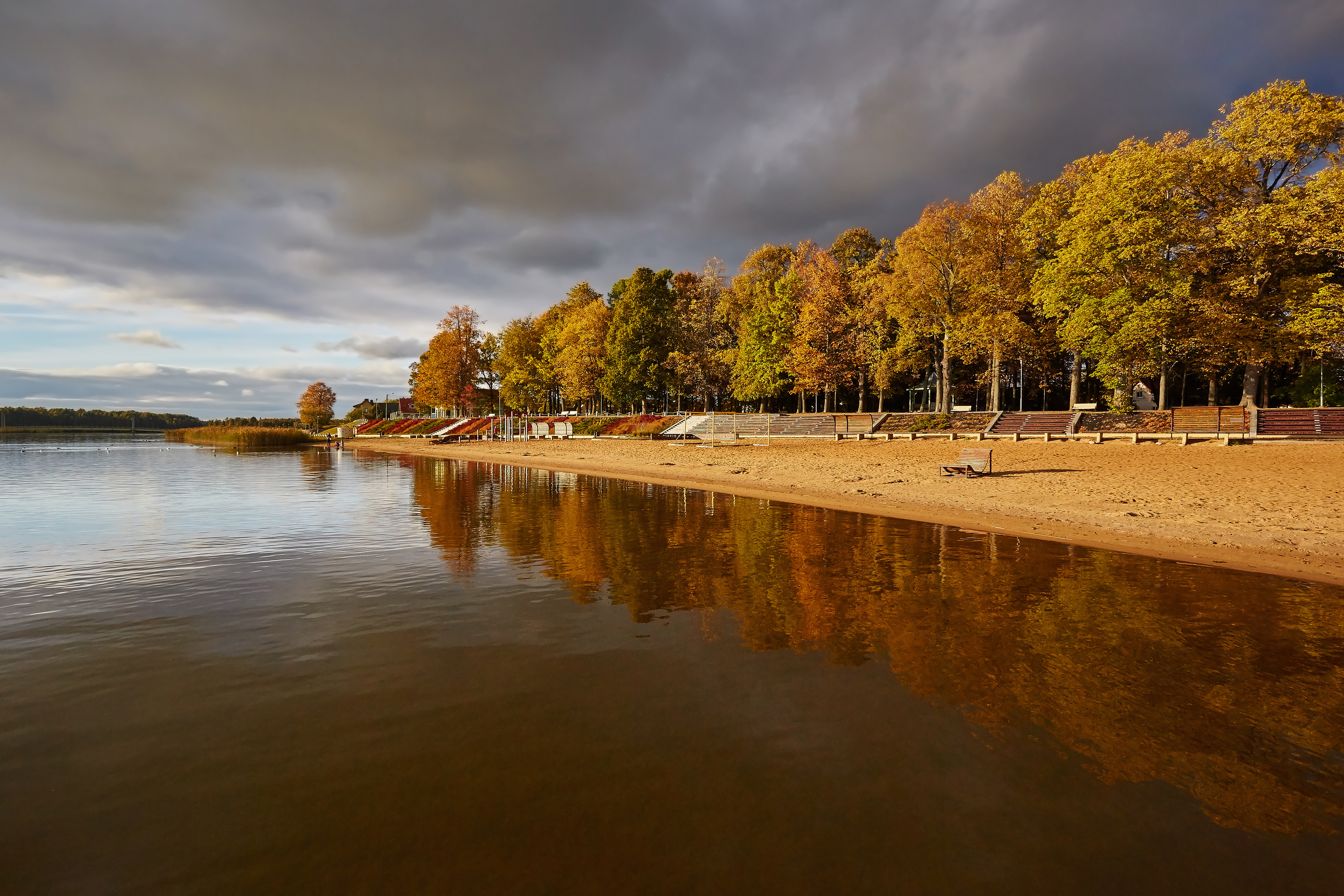
Beach promenade on the town side

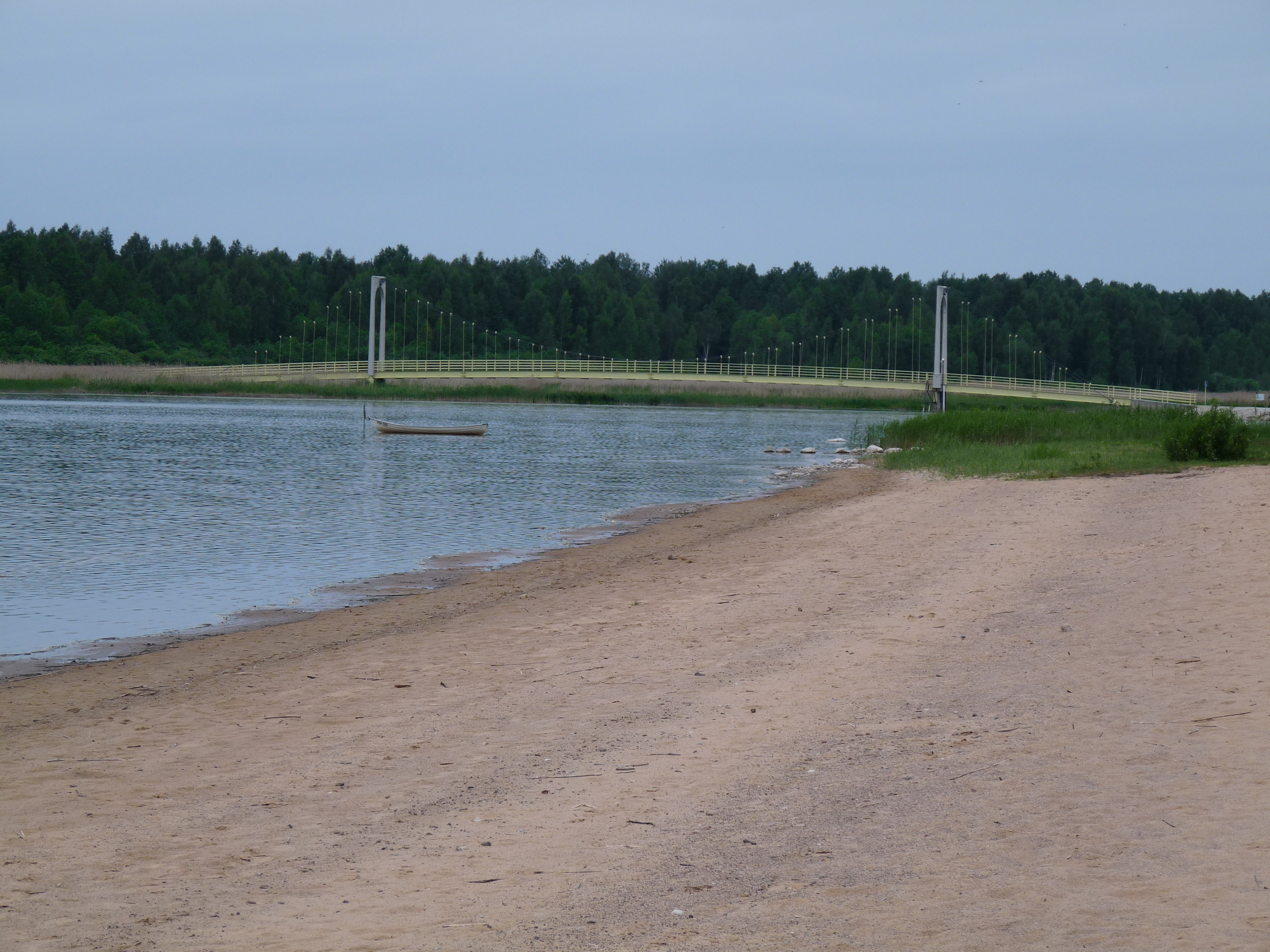
A suspension bridge on the northern end of the lake

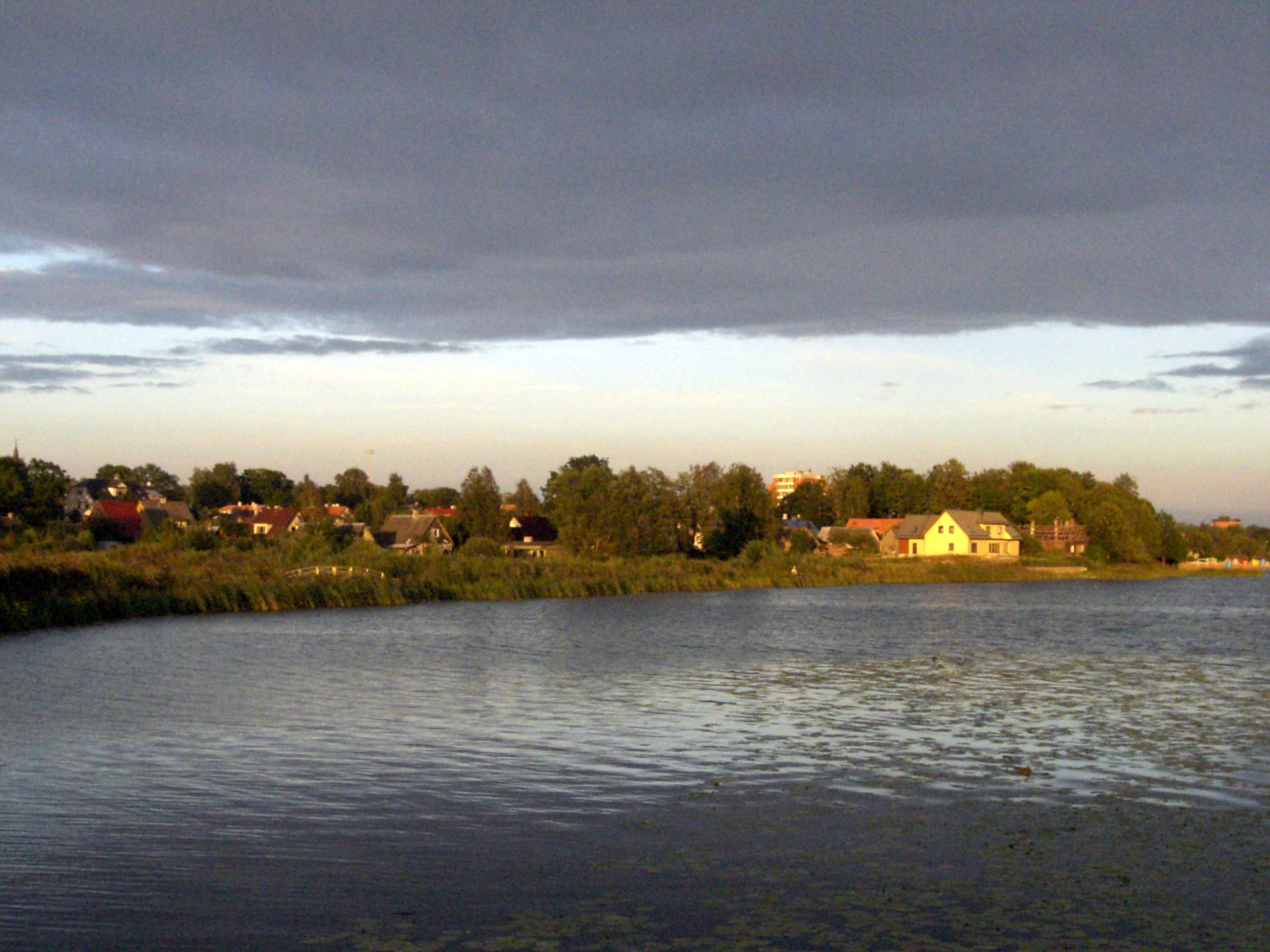
View of the lake from the bridge

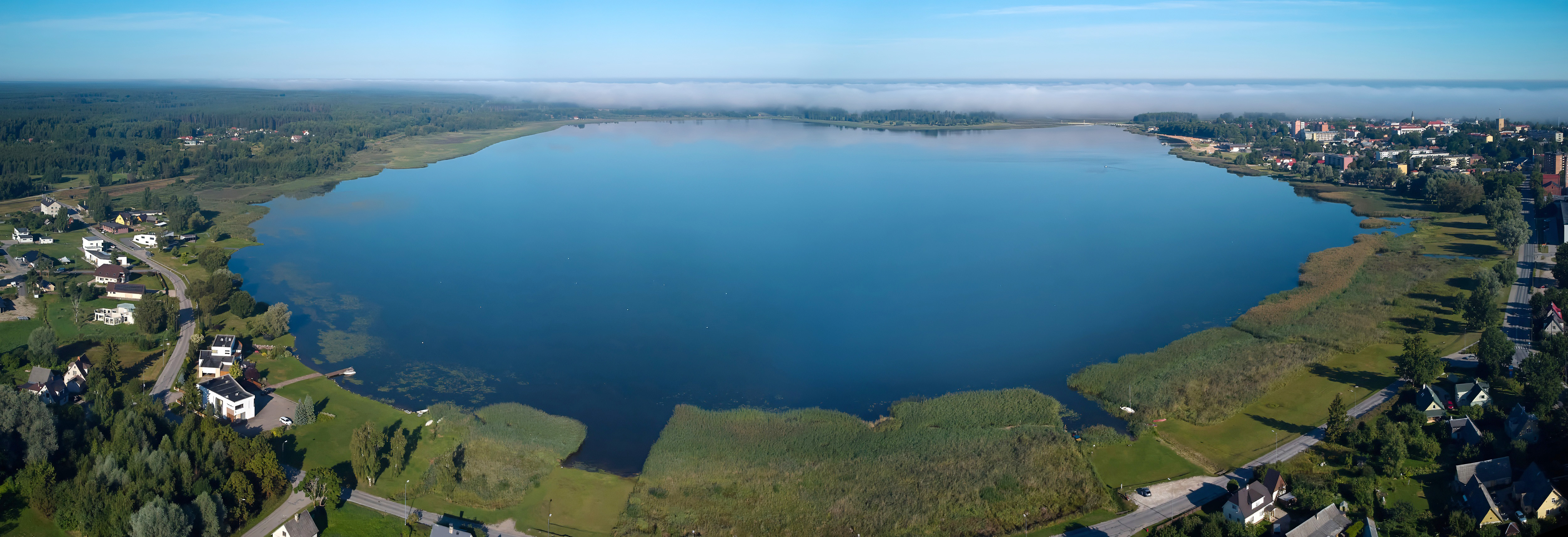

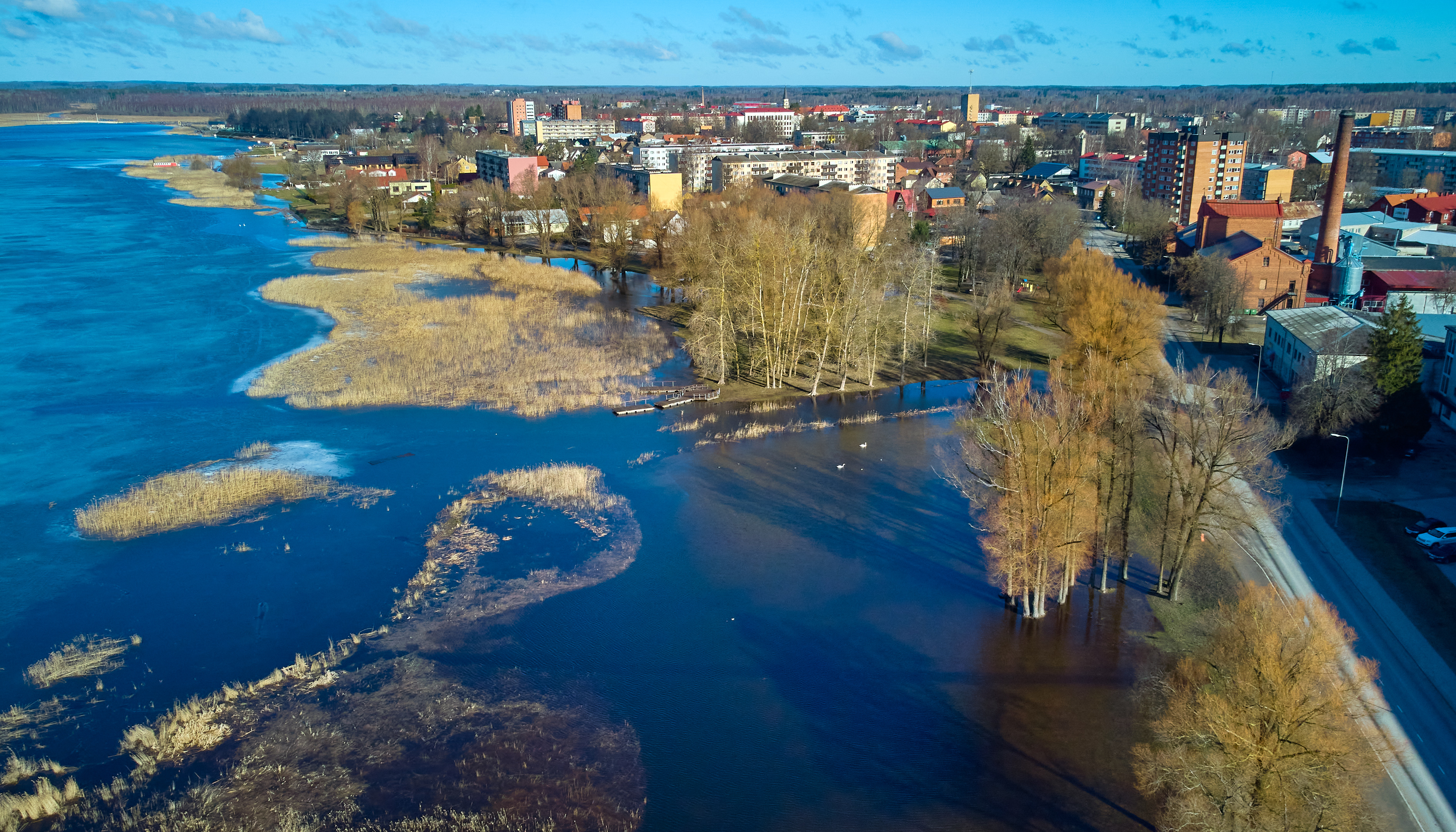

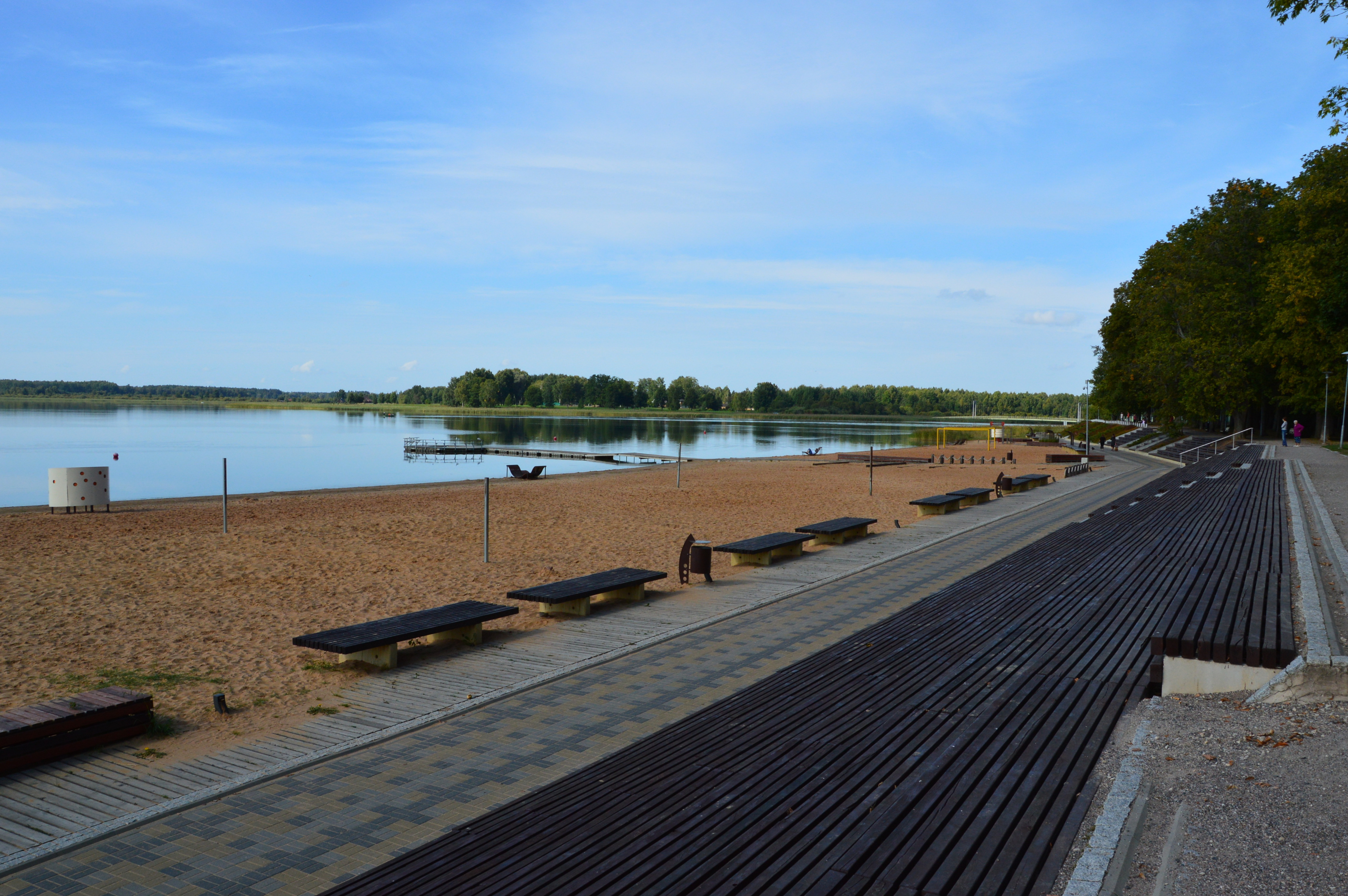

== See also ==
- List of lakes in Estonia
- Lake Vagula
