= Võru =

Town in Estonia

Võru Võro (Võro)
- Town
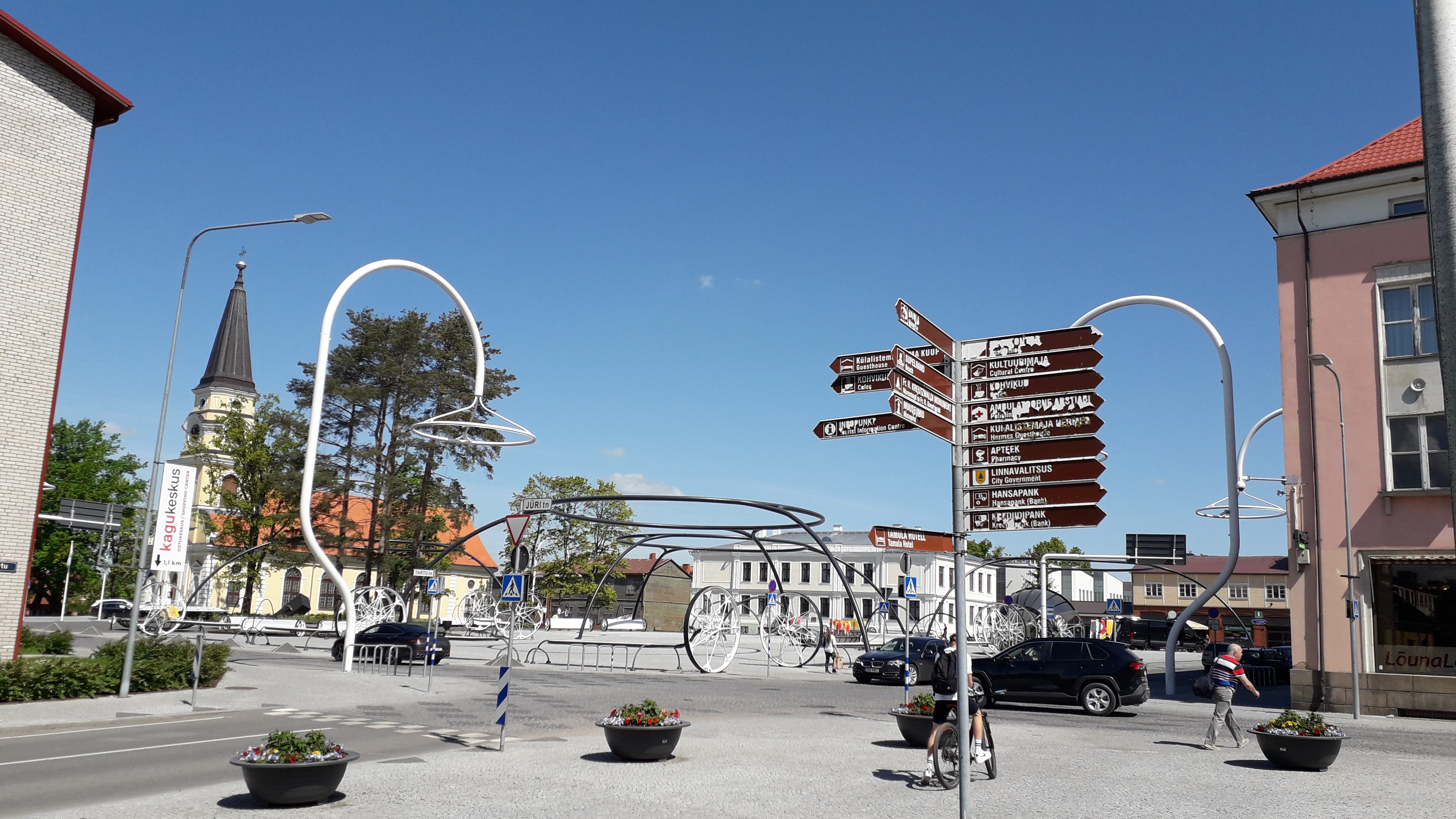
- Võru city centre

- Flag Coat of arms

- Location in Estonia
- Coordinates: 57°50′55″N 26°59′34″E
- Country: Estonia
- County: Võru County
- Founded: 21 August 1784

Government
  - Mayor: Urmas Tali

Area
  - Total: 14.01 km^{2} (5.41 sq mi)
- Elevation: 84 m (276 ft)

Population (2026)
  - Total: 11,813
  - Rank: 11th
  - Density: 843.2/km^{2} (2,184/sq mi)

Ethnicity
  - Estonians: 93%
  - Russians: 5%
  - other: 2%
- Time zone: UTC+2 (EET)
  - Summer (DST): UTC+3 (EEST)
- ISO 3166 code: EE-919
- Website: www.voru.ee

Võru (Estonian: [ˈvɤru]; Võro: Võro; German: Werro) is a town and a municipality in south-eastern Estonia. It is the center of both the Võru County and the Võru Parish although the town itself is not part of the Võru Parish but forms a separate urban municipality.

Võru has a population of 11,813 (as of 2026).

== History ==
Võru was founded on 21 August 1784, at the request of the Empress Catherine II of Russia, by the order of Riga Governor general count George Browne, on the site of the former Võru estate as the center of the new county.

From 1797 until today, Võru has been the administrative center of the surrounding region. In the past, the county was larger than the current one and covered the entire area of Võrumaa.

In 1827, the Võru Town Hospital was opened and Friedrich Reinhold Kreutzwald, who lived and worked as a doctor in Võru from 1833 to 1877, also wrote the Estonian national epic Kalevipoeg in Võru. The development of the town was facilitated by the Pskov-Riga railway completed in 1889, which enabled Võru to have a direct connection with Riga and St. Petersburg. As a result, trade was developed, a flour mill, a sawmill and a distillery were built. Võru became the center of the surrounding rural area.

== Geography and climate ==
The town is situated on the shore of Lake Tamula, in the low and wide Võru-Hargla valley.

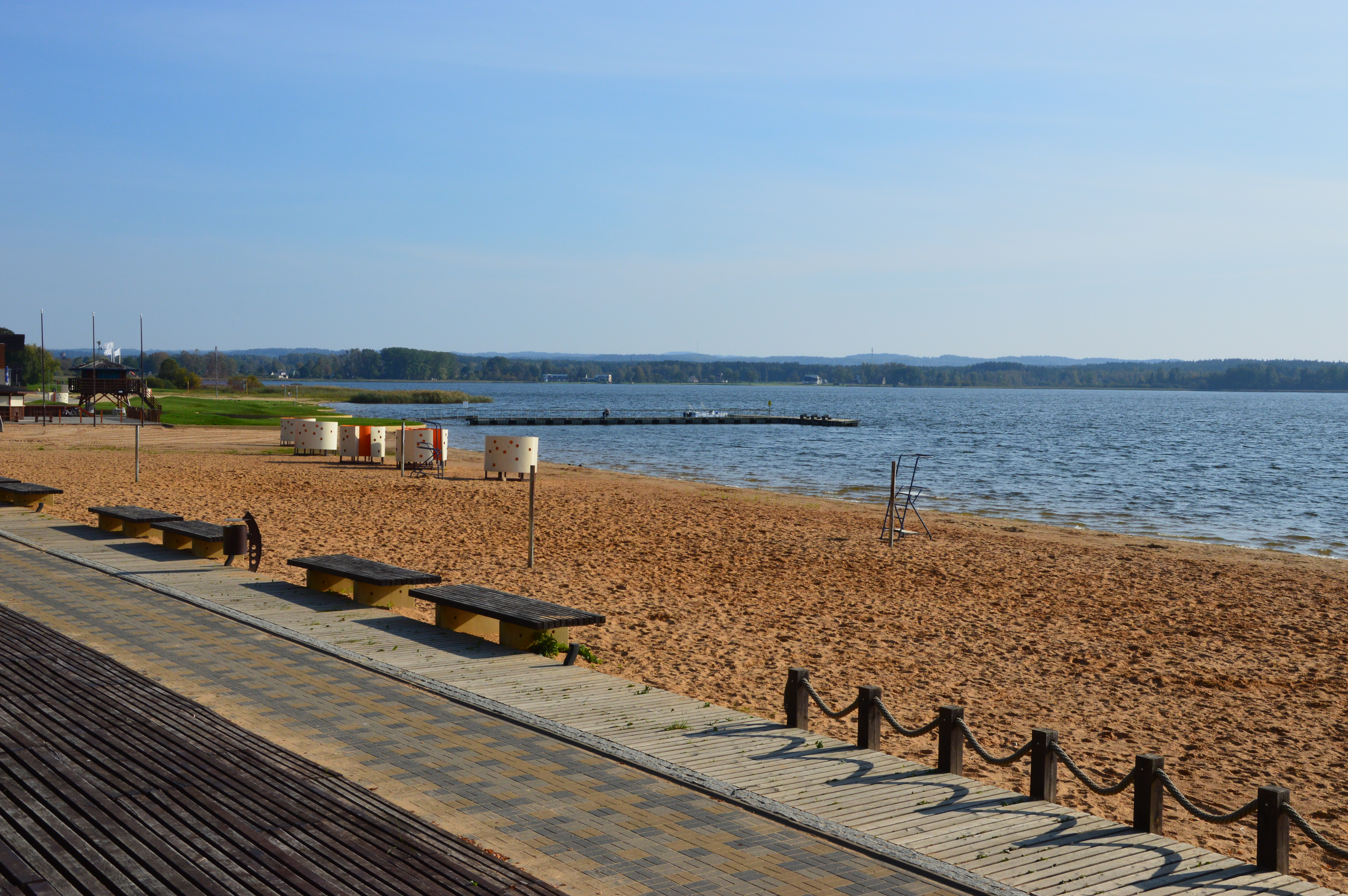
Tamula lake in autumn

Võru has a humid continental climate (Dfb according to the Köppen climate classification) with warm summers and cold winters. Võru has one of the most continental climates in Estonia: both the temperatures of 35.6 °C (96.1 °F), the highest temperature ever recorded in the country, and −43.4 °C (−46.1 °F), 0.1 °C (0.2 °F) short of the coldest temperature ever recorded in the country (in Jõgeva), were recorded here. Precipitation is usually higher in early summer to late autumn, and lower in late winter to early spring.

Climate data for Võru (normals 1991–2020, extremes 1868–present)
Month	Jan	Feb	Mar	Apr	May	Jun	Jul	Aug	Sep	Oct	Nov	Dec	Year
Record high °C (°F)	9.6 (49.3)	12.9 (55.2)	19.9 (67.8)	27.8 (82.0)	31.1 (88.0)	33.8 (92.8)	35.2 (95.4)	35.6 (96.1)	29.9 (85.8)	22.2 (72.0)	14.2 (57.6)	11.7 (53.1)	35.6 (96.1)
Mean daily maximum °C (°F)	−1.8 (28.8)	−1.3 (29.7)	3.7 (38.7)	11.4 (52.5)	17.6 (63.7)	21.1 (70.0)	23.6 (74.5)	22.1 (71.8)	16.5 (61.7)	9.4 (48.9)	3.4 (38.1)	−0.1 (31.8)	10.5 (50.9)
Daily mean °C (°F)	−4.2 (24.4)	−4.5 (23.9)	−0.4 (31.3)	6.1 (43.0)	11.9 (53.4)	15.9 (60.6)	18.4 (65.1)	16.9 (62.4)	11.9 (53.4)	6.2 (43.2)	1.3 (34.3)	−2.1 (28.2)	6.5 (43.7)
Mean daily minimum °C (°F)	−6.7 (19.9)	−7.6 (18.3)	−4.2 (24.4)	1.2 (34.2)	6.0 (42.8)	10.7 (51.3)	13.3 (55.9)	12.1 (53.8)	8.0 (46.4)	3.3 (37.9)	−0.8 (30.6)	−4.3 (24.3)	2.6 (36.7)
Record low °C (°F)	−43.4 (−46.1)	−37.9 (−36.2)	−30.2 (−22.4)	−18.8 (−1.8)	−9.4 (15.1)	−1.0 (30.2)	1.7 (35.1)	1.0 (33.8)	−5 (23)	−14.4 (6.1)	−21.9 (−7.4)	−40.5 (−40.9)	−43.4 (−46.1)
Average precipitation mm (inches)	45 (1.8)	36 (1.4)	34 (1.3)	35 (1.4)	53 (2.1)	83 (3.3)	75 (3.0)	79 (3.1)	57 (2.2)	64 (2.5)	51 (2.0)	45 (1.8)	658 (25.9)
Average precipitation days (≥ 1.0 mm)	12.3	9.5	8.9	8.1	8.7	10.8	9.6	10.8	9.6	11.4	10.7	11.6	122.0
Average relative humidity (%)	88	85	77	69	67	71	74	77	82	86	89	89	79
Mean monthly sunshine hours	29.3	60.5	136.6	194.8	271.8	261.1	276.1	237.4	150.8	75.2	27.3	17.3	1,738.2
Source: Estonian Weather Service

== Demographics ==
Ethnic composition 1897-2021
Ethnicity	1897		1922		1934		1941		1959		1970		1979		1989		2000		2011		2021	
Ethnicity	amount	%	amount	%	amount	%	amount	%	amount	%	amount	%	amount	%	amount	%	amount	%	amount	%	amount	%
Estonians	2675	64.4	4480	88.3	4855	91.1	5250	97.1	8604	80.4	12307	79.9	13783	82.2	14985	85.6	13414	90.2	11651	92.0	11042	93.1
Russians	248	5.97	163	3.21	171	3.21	87	1.61	-	-	2277	14.8	2378	14.2	1934	11.1	1112	7.47	804	6.35	599	5.05
Ukrainians	-	-	-	-	0	0.00	-	-	-	-	312	2.03	261	1.56	249	1.42	99	0.67	64	0.51	51	0.43
Belarusians	-	-	-	-	-	-	-	-	-	-	112	0.73	96	0.57	90	0.51	44	0.30	30	0.24	22	0.19
Finns	-	-	-	-	3	0.06	1	0.02	-	-	91	0.59	77	0.46	81	0.46	61	0.41	40	0.32	27	0.23
Jews	258	6.21	118	2.33	96	1.80	0	0.00	-	-	20	0.13	10	0.06	12	0.07	6	0.04	4	0.03	4	0.03
Latvians	118	2.84	-	-	37	0.69	21	0.39	-	-	30	0.19	30	0.18	35	0.20	23	0.15	14	0.11	23	0.19
Germans	824	19.8	188	3.71	145	2.72	-	-	-	-	-	-	33	0.20	17	0.10	7	0.05	5	0.04	8	0.07
Tatars	-	-	-	-	0	0.00	-	-	-	-	-	-	19	0.11	12	0.07	6	0.04	1	0.01	0	0.00
Poles	20	0.48	-	-	11	0.21	9	0.17	-	-	-	-	18	0.11	22	0.13	8	0.05	6	0.05	3	0.03
Lithuanians	-	-	-	-	0	0.00	0	0.00	-	-	30	0.19	4	0.02	4	0.02	3	0.02	3	0.02	0	0.00
unknown	0	0.00	0	0.00	1	0.02	6	0.11	0	0.00	0	0.00	0	0.00	0	0.00	44	0.30	9	0.07	40	0.34
other	9	0.22	122	2.41	13	0.24	33	0.61	2096	19.6	219	1.42	58	0.35	55	0.31	52	0.35	36	0.28	43	0.36
Total	4152	100	5071	100	5332	100	5407	100	10700	100	15398	100	16767	100	17496	100	14879	100	12667	100	11865	99.9

Religion in Võru (2021)
1. Unaffiliated (73.7%)
2. Lutheran (16.2%)
3. Orthodox (7.20%)
4. Others Christians (1.70%)
5. Others Religions or Unknown (1.20%)

== Culture ==
The Võru Folklore Festival has been held annually in Võru in July since 1995.

Friedrich Reinhold Kreutzwald, the author of the Estonian national epic Kalevipoeg, lived in Võru from 1833 to 1877. The Kreutzwald Memorial Museum and the Võro Institute are also located in Võru.

== Sports ==
Võru is home to Võru Stadium, the home ground of II liiga football team Võru JK.

== Transport ==
European route E263 is the main connection with the rest of Estonia. Other roads connect Võru with Põlva, Räpina, Antsla and Valga. The Valga–Pechory railway, which passes through Võru, is currently inactive. The Võru railway station is unused as of 2001.

== Military ==
Võru is home to Taara Army Base, headquarters of the Kuperjanov Infantry Battalion.

== Twin towns – sister cities ==
Võru is twinned with:

- Alūksne, Latvia
- Bad Segeberg, Germany
- Chambray-lès-Tours, France
- Härryda, Sweden
- Iisalmi, Finland
- Joniškis, Lithuania
- Kaniv, Ukraine
- Laitila, Finland
- Landskrona, Sweden
- Pechorsky District, Russia
- Smolyan, Bulgaria
- Suwałki, Poland

== Notable people ==
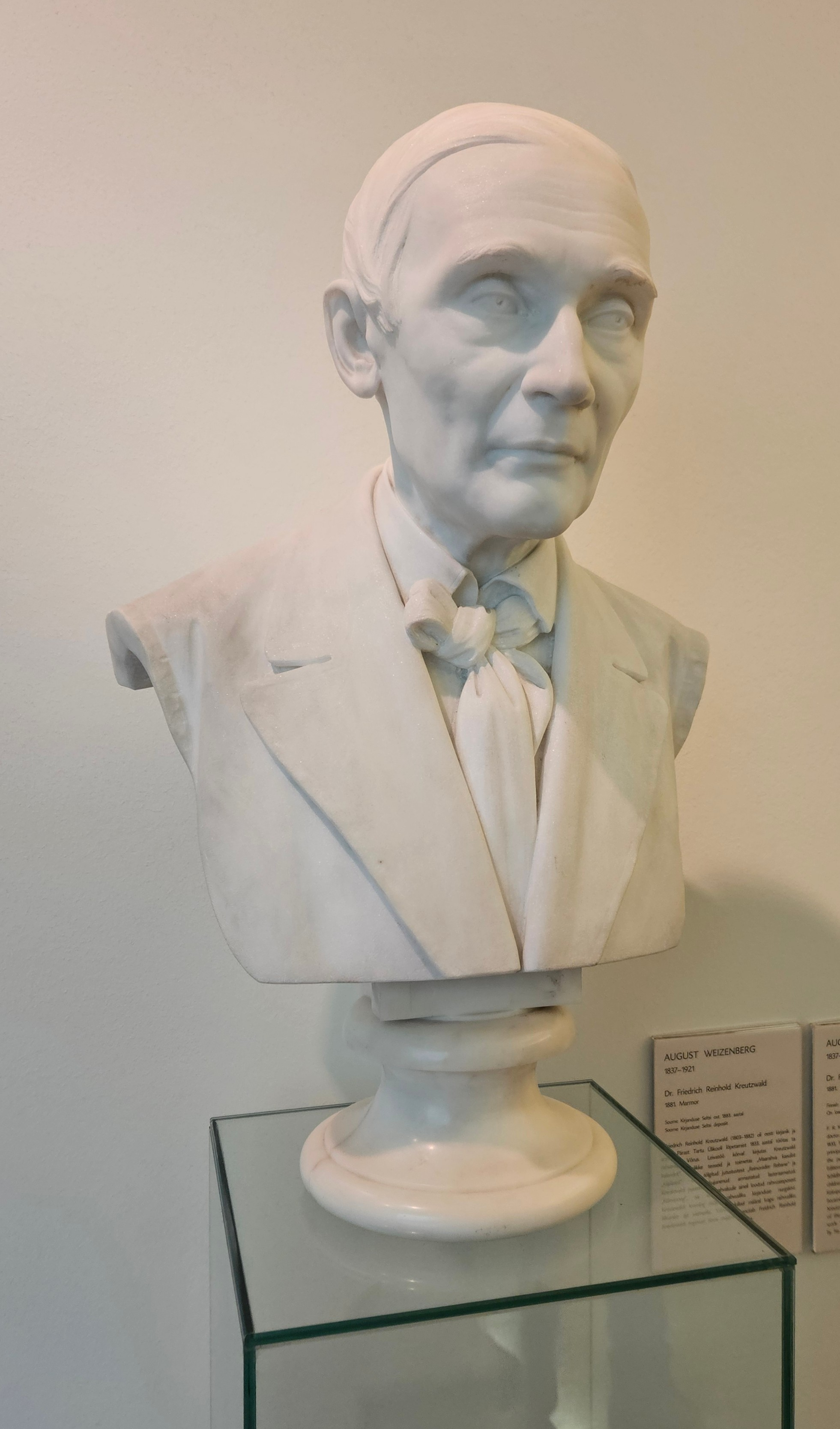
Friedrich Reinhold Kreutzwald, 1881

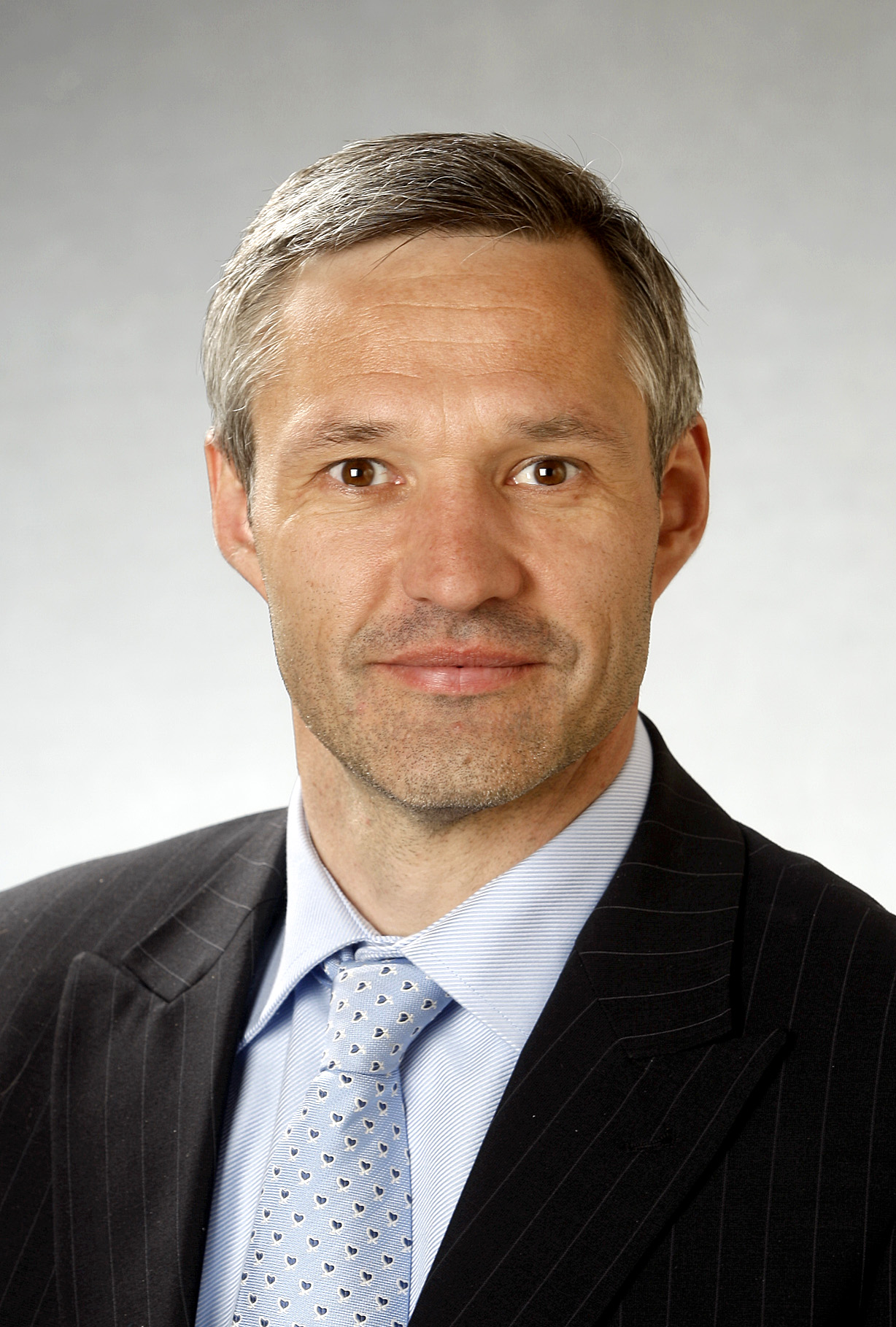
Erki Nool, 2011

- Friedrich Reinhold Kreutzwald (1803–1882), Estonian writer and folklorist, the author of Estonian national epic Kalevipoeg, lived in Võru from 1833 to 1877.
- Walter Beick (1883–1933), a Russian ornithologist of Baltic German descent
- Priidu Puusepp (1887–1972), Estonian educator and linguist
- Katrin Välbe (1904–1981), Estonian film, radio and TV actress
- Moses Wolf Goldberg (1905–1964), Estonian-Jewish chemist, lived in Võru as a child.
- Debora Vaarandi (1916–2007), Estonian writer and poet
- Helmut Ajango (1931–2013), Estonian-American architect
- Leon Sibul (1932–2007), American electrical engineer and professor of acoustics
- Priit Aimla (born 1941) writer, poet, humorist and politician
- Peeter Saan (born 1959), conductor, clarinet and saxophone player and military reserve officer
- Marianne Mikko (born 1961), Estonian politician & MEP
- Erki Pehk (born 1968), Estonian conductor and artistic director
- Sulev Iva (born 1969), Võro identity advocate, founder of Võro Institute
- Ain Mäeots (born 1971), Estonian actor and director
- Hilje Murel (born 1975), Estonian stage, film and television actress
- Kullar Viimne (born 1980), Estonian director, scriptwriter, editor and cinematographer.
- Igor Taro (born 1981), an Estonian journalist and politician
- Uku Suviste (born 1982), Estonian singer-songwriter and music producer

=== Sport ===
- Erki Nool (born 1970), Estonian decathlete and politician, gold medallist at the 2000 Summer Olympics
- Janno Prants (born 1973), Estonian biathlete
- Priit Narusk (born 1977), Estonian cross-country skier
- Meelis Kanep (born 1983), Estonian chess grandmaster
- Anti Saarepuu (born 1983), Estonian cross-country skier
- Kaija Udras (born 1986), Estonian cross-country skier

== Gallery ==
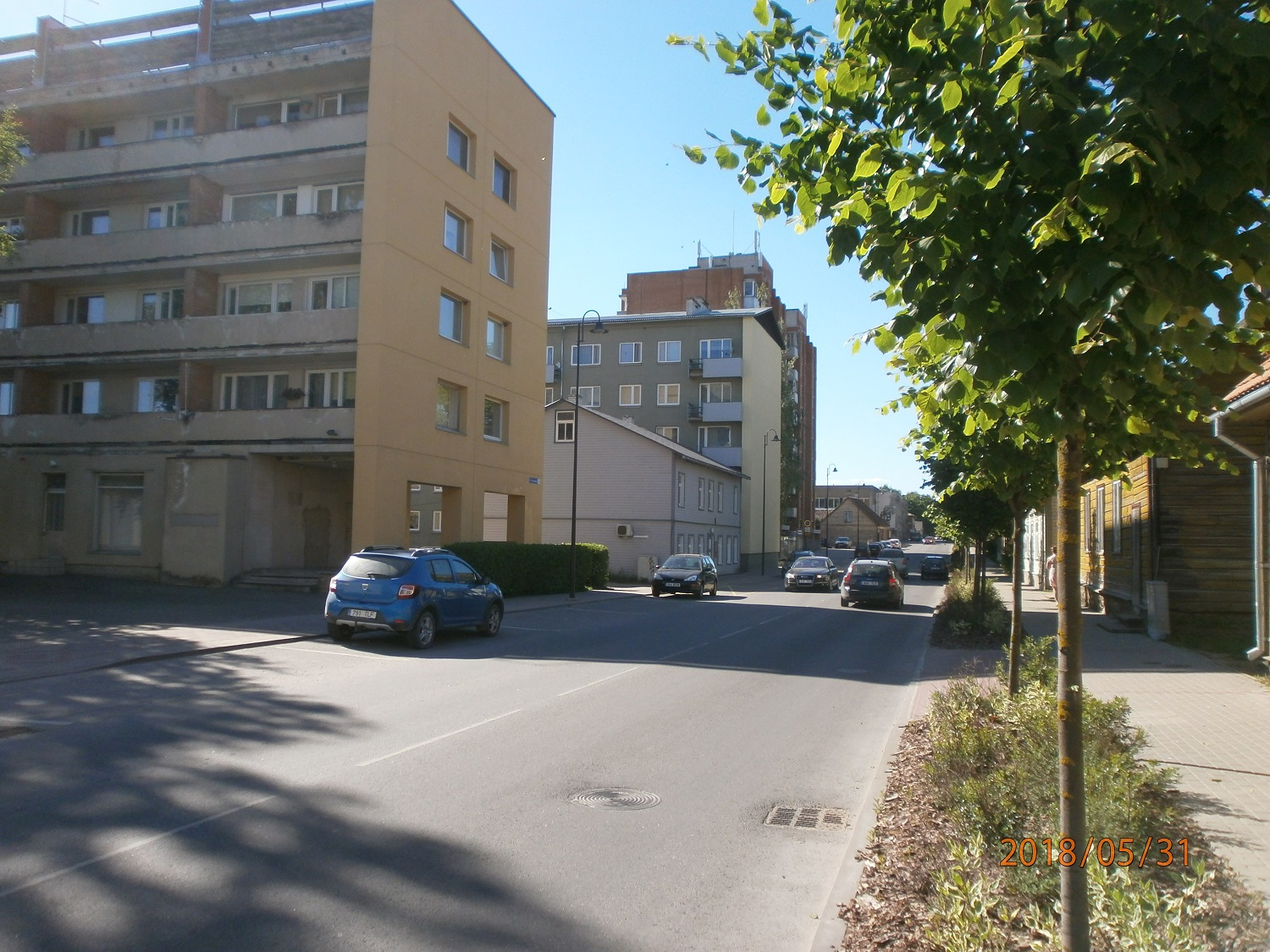
Võru town centre

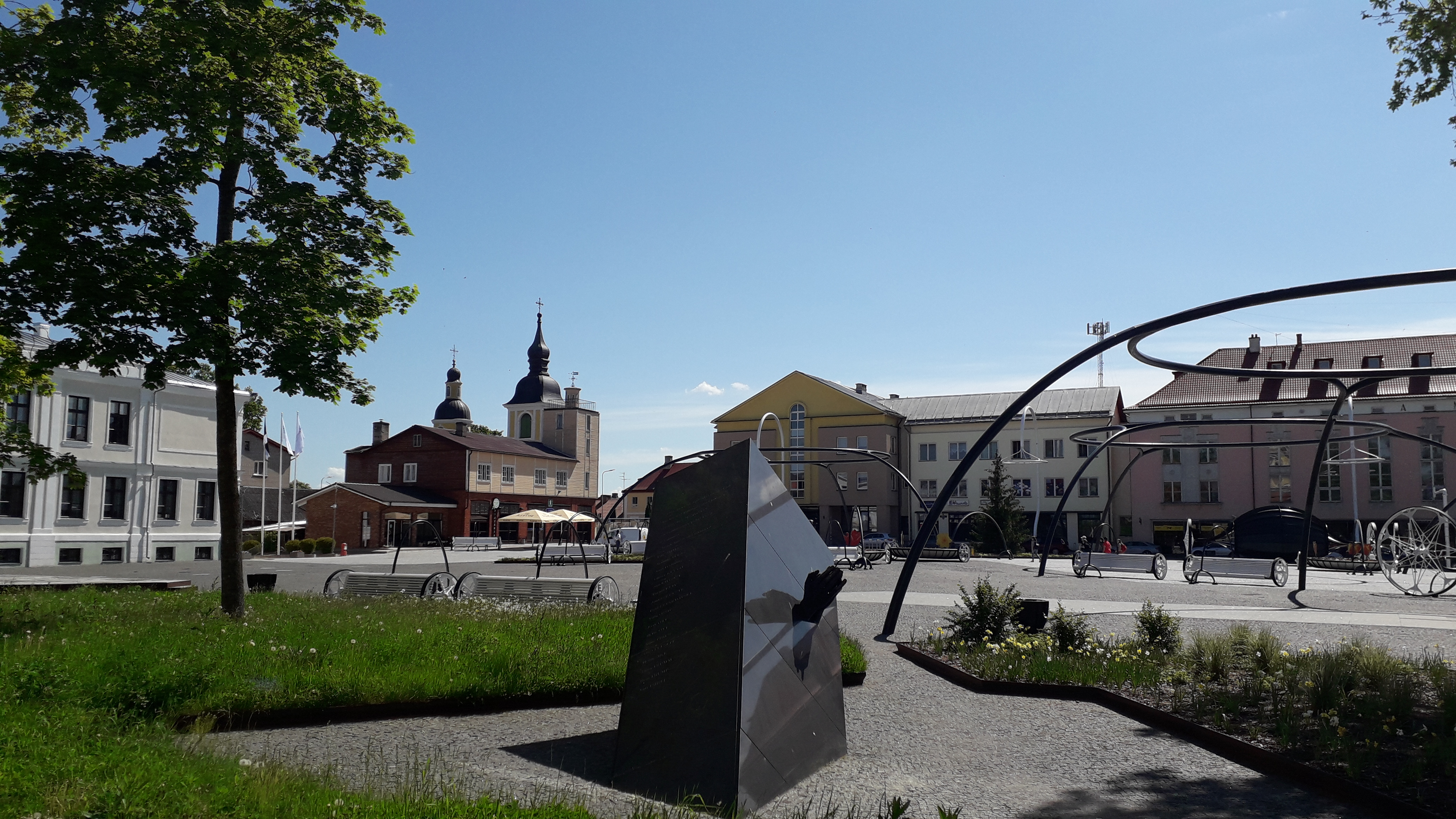
MS Estonia memorial on the central square

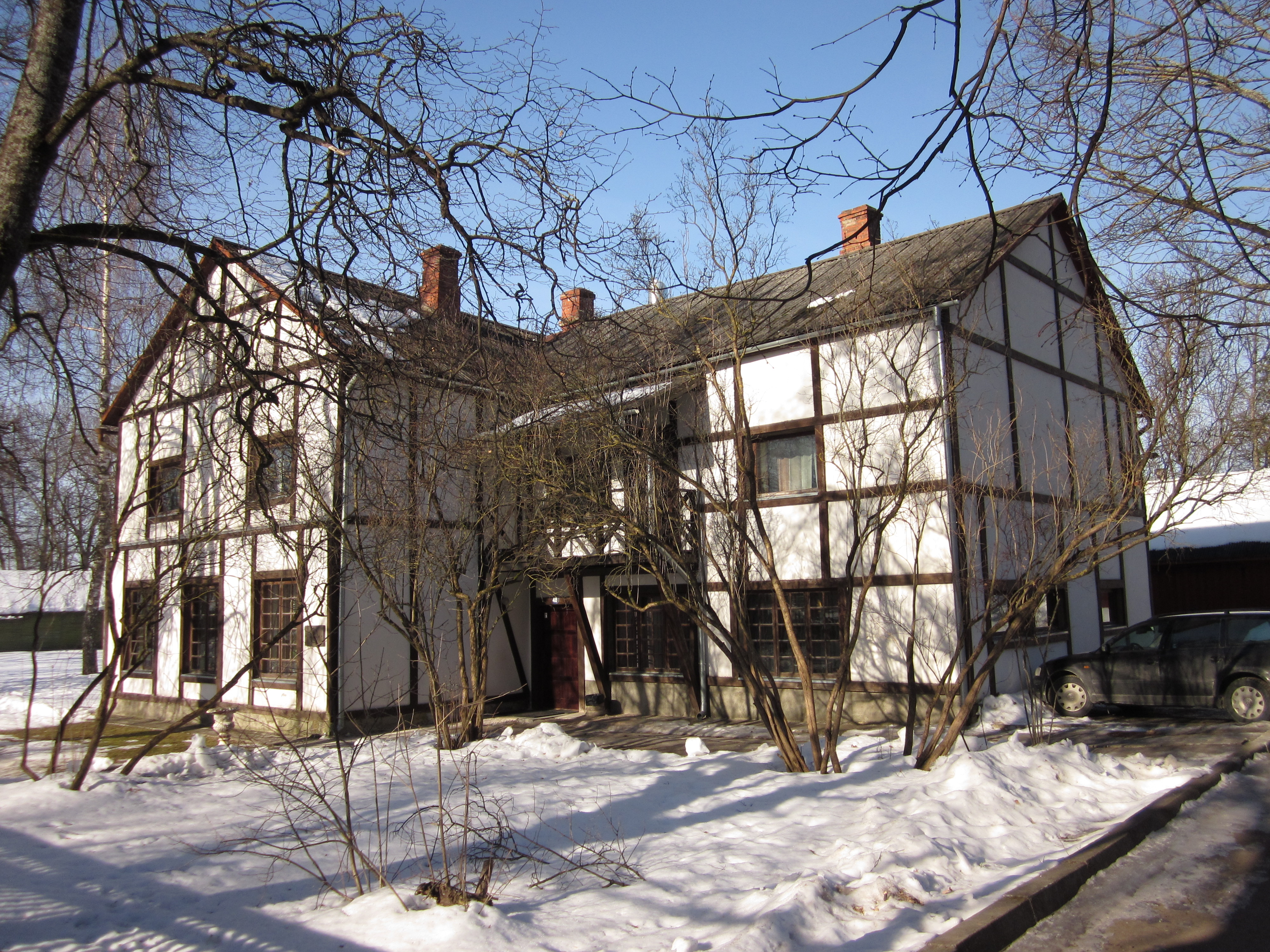
Võro Institute

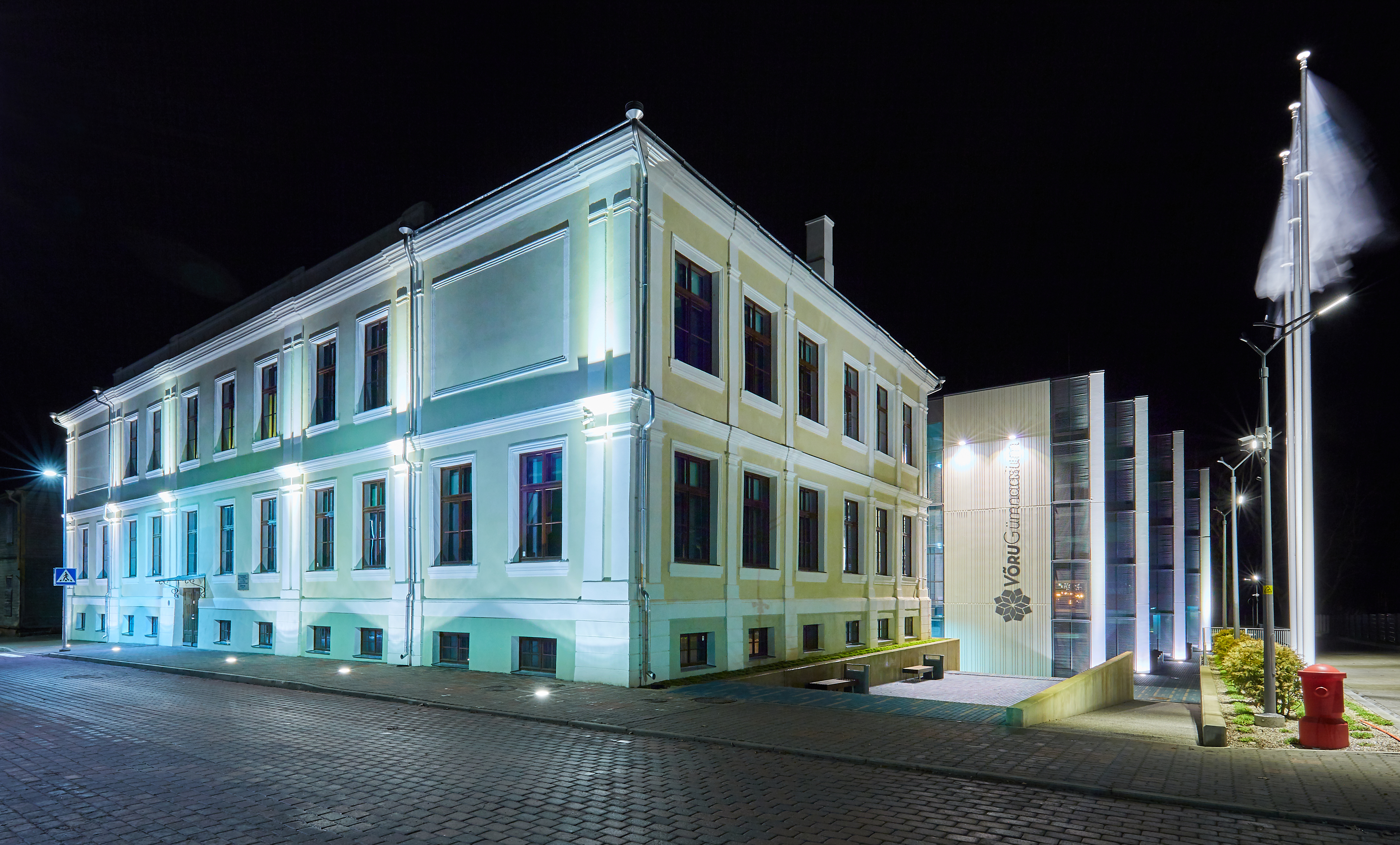
Võru Gymnasium

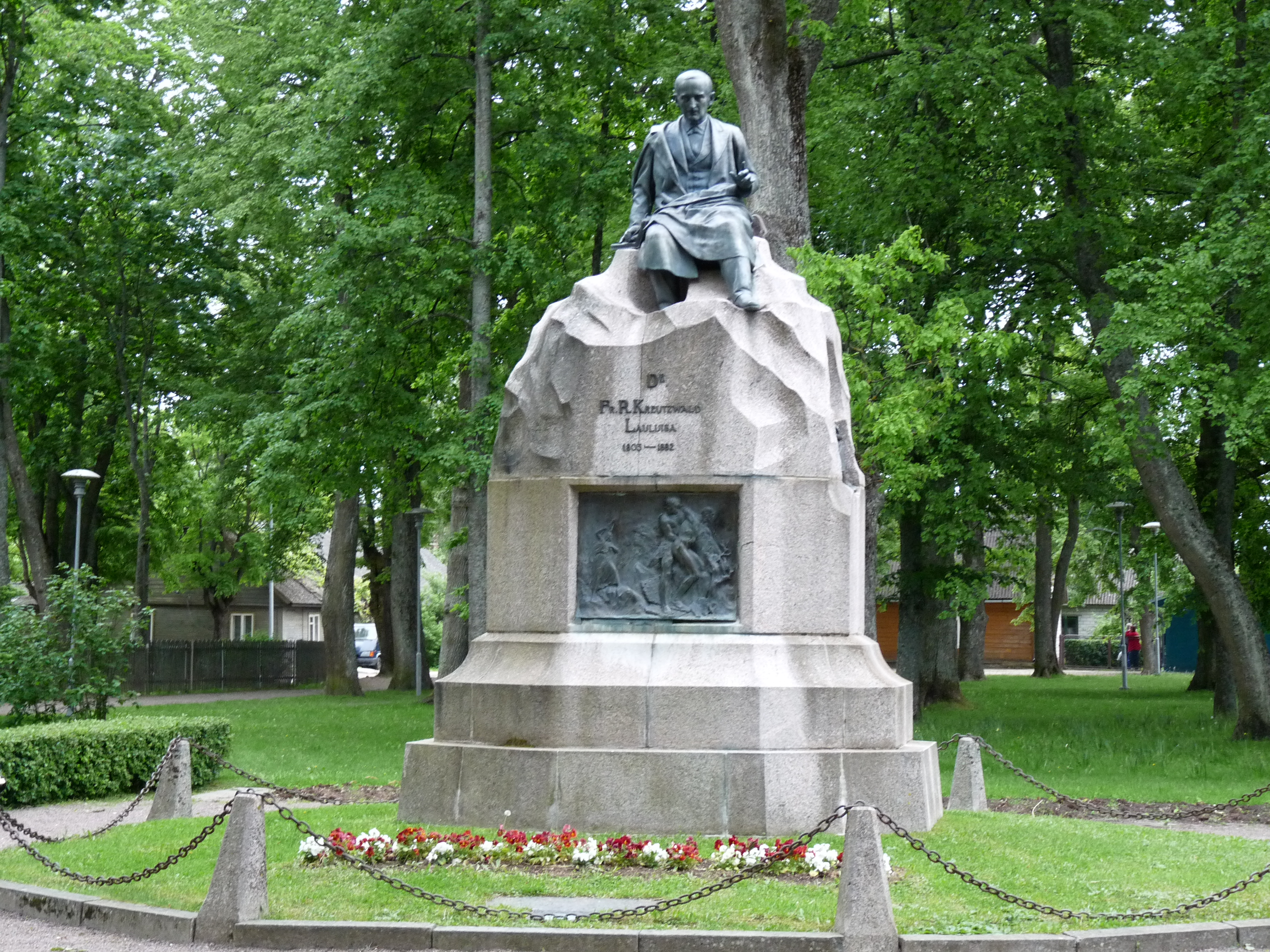
Monument to Friedrich Reinhold Kreutzwald

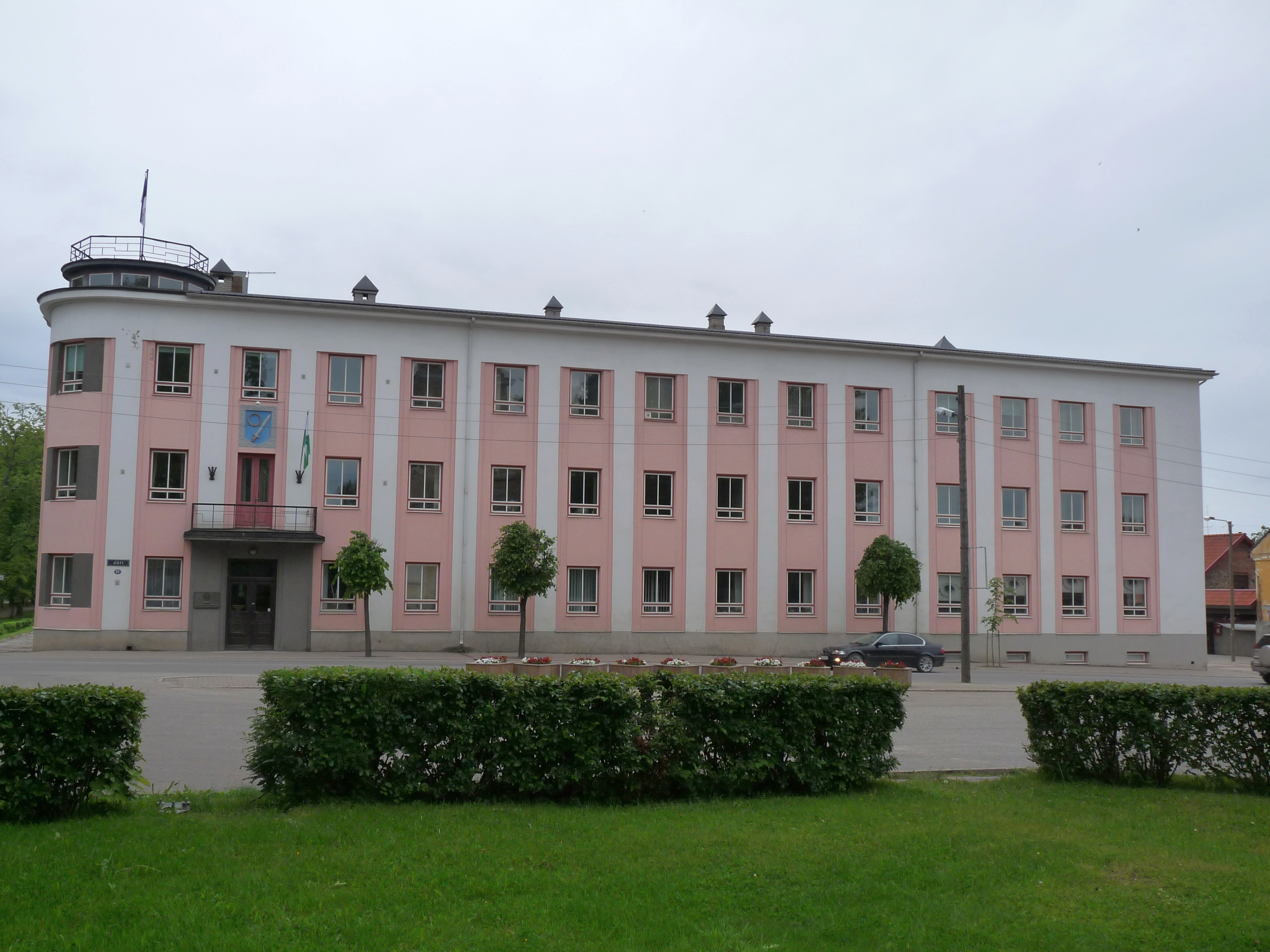
Võru county government building

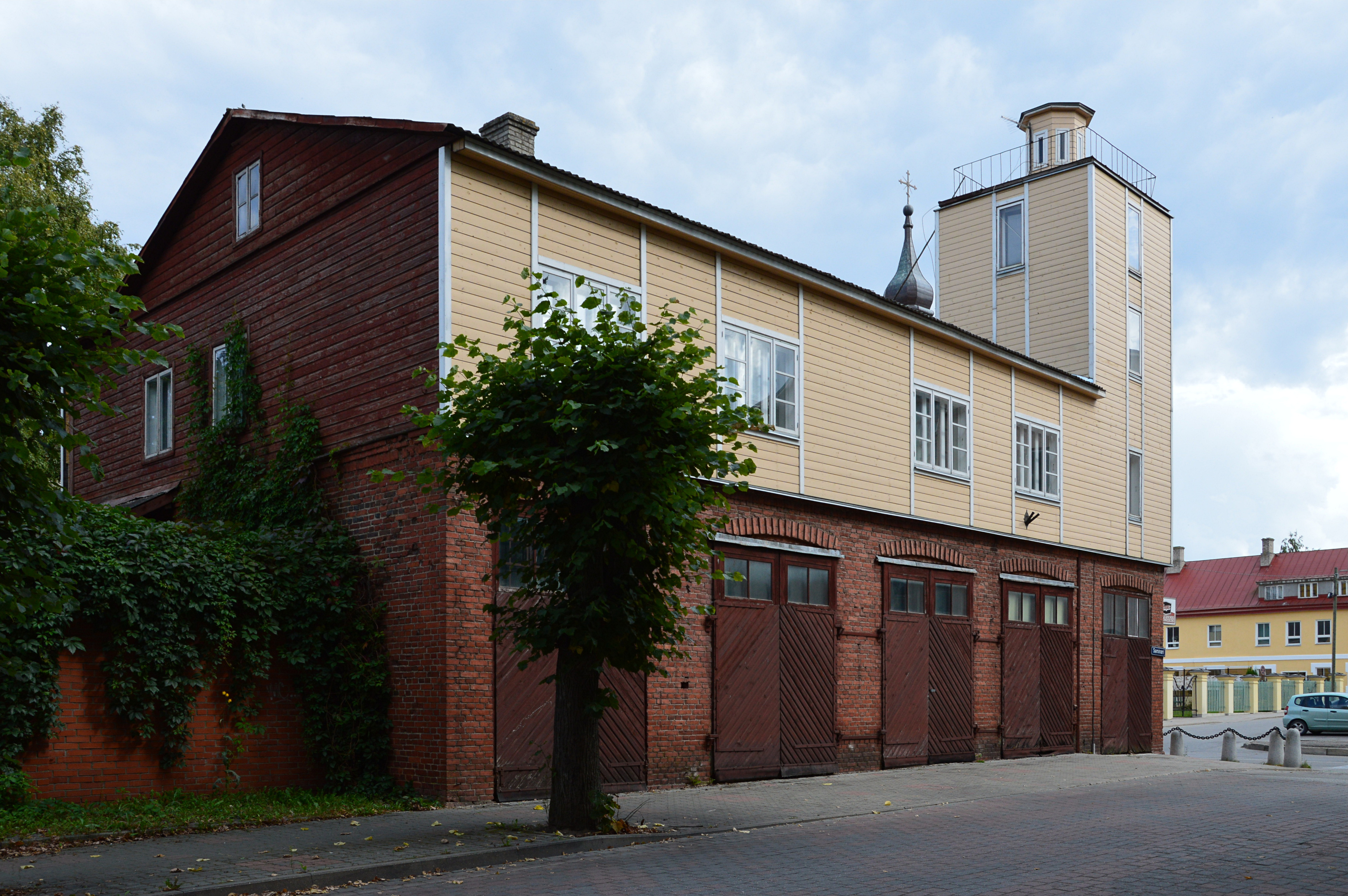
Old fire station

== See also ==
- Võro language
