= Võrumaa =

Estonian historical county

Võrumaa (German: Kreis Werro; Võro: Võromaa) was a historical county in Estonia. The historical Võrumaa includes the areas of the present counties of Võru, Põlva, Valga and Tartu.

== Ancient period ==
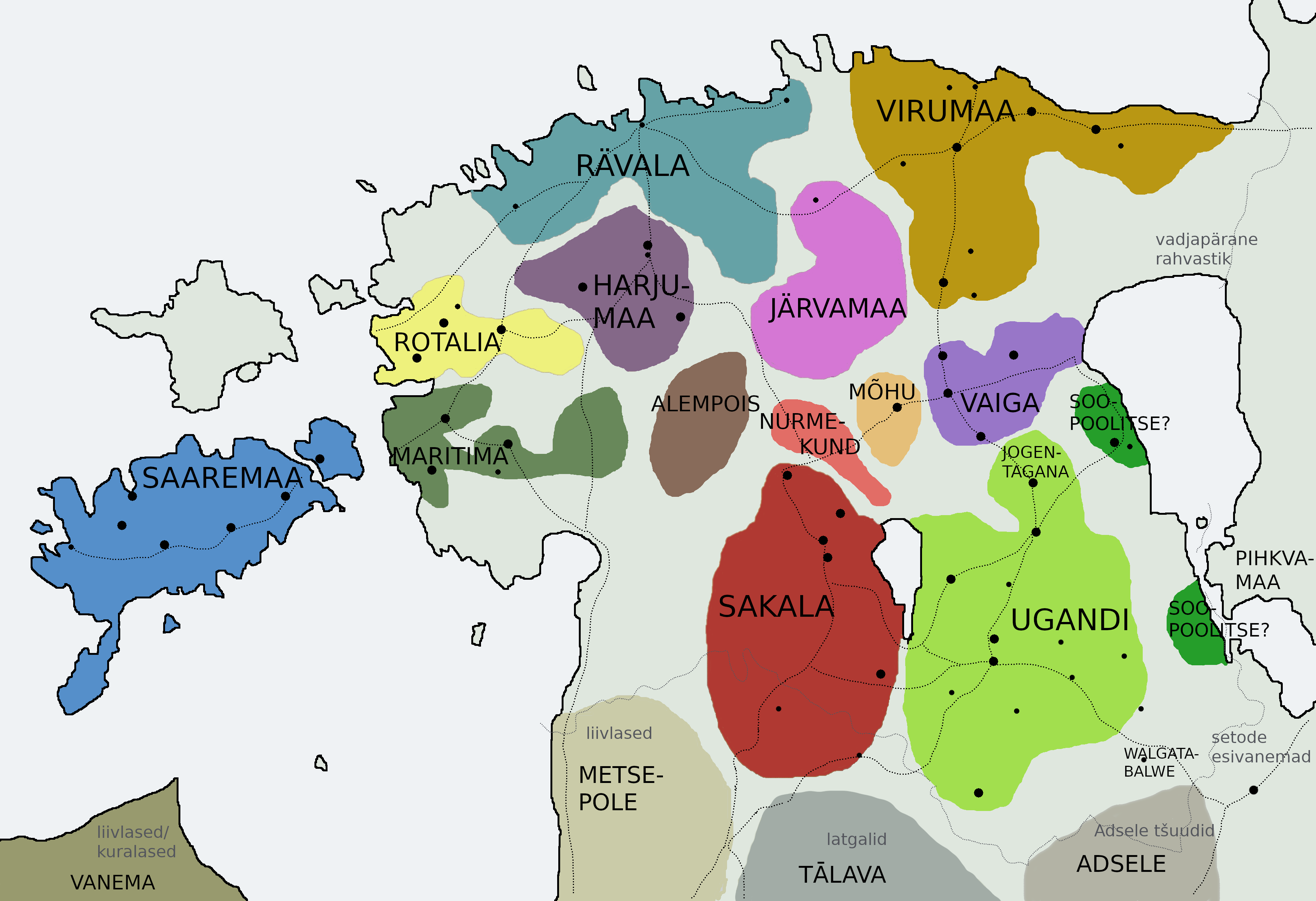
Ancient counties, fortresses and roads of Estonia and northern Latvia.

The center of the settlement of Võrumaa is the banks of the Võhandu river. The first settlements in Võrumaa were Kääpa and Villal on the shores of Lake Tamula, the oldest of which is Kääpa, where people lived as early as the first half of the third millennium BCE.

In the Middle and Early Iron Age, in southeastern Estonia Ugandi County was formed.

== Middle ages ==
In the 13th century, the Livonian Brothers of the Sword invaded the territories of Latvia and Estonia; The army defeated Ugandi in 1224. After the conquest, the Diocese of Dorpat was formed in Ugandi. During the diocese, the Kirumpää Episcopal Castle and Vastseliina fortress were built in the Võrumaa area for border protection against the Russians.

During the Livonian War, from 1558 to 1583, the area of Võrumaa was under the rule of the Grand Duchy of Moscow, but in 1582, Estonian Jam Zapolski remained under Polish rule.

== Russian empire ==
During the Great Northern War (1700–1721), Võrumaa came under the rule of the Tsardom of Russia in 1704.
