= List of former Estonian commanders =

This is a list of the former Estonian commanders, which also includes the Estonian officers who have served in the Imperial Russian Army, Wehrmacht, Waffen SS and the military commanders, who have retired since the restoration of the Republic of Estonia in 1991:

== Generals ==
Generals and Admirals

- Johan Laidoner
- Aleksander Einseln
- Ants Laaneots
- Riho Terras

Lieutenant Generals and Vice Admirals

- Paul Lill
- Nikolai Reek
- Gustav Jonson
- Johannes Kert
- Tarmo Kõuts (Merevägi)

Major Generals and Rear Admirals

- Ernst Põdder
- Aleksander Tõnisson
- Jaan Soots
- Otto Heinze
- Andres Larka
- Johannes Orasmaa
- Johannes Soodla
- Herbert Brede
- Aleksander Silberg
- Dimitri Lebedev
- Werner Zoege von Manteuffel
- Aleksander Paldrok
- Ludvig Puusepp
- Johan Unt
- Artur Lossmann
- Juhan Tõrvand
- Gustav Kunnos
- Gustav Jonson
- Tõnis Rotberg
- Ants Kurvits
- Rudolf Reimann
- Hans Leesment
- Jaan Kruus
- Aleksander Pulk
- Otto Sternbeck
- Voldemar Rieberg
- Hugo Kauler
- Martin Jervan
- Nikolai Helk
- August Traksmaa
- Aleksander Jaakson
- Richard Tomberg
- August Kasekamp
- Jaan Lukas
- Jaan Maide
- Ants Kurvits
- Hugo-Eduard Kauler
- Harry Hein
- Neeme Väli
- Meelis Kiili
- Veiko-Vello Palm
- Riho Ühtegi

- Johan Pitka (Merevägi)
- Hermann Salza (Merevägi)
- Igor Schvede (Merevägi)

- Teo Krüüner (Õhuvägi)
- Vello Loemaa (Õhuvägi)
- Valeri Saar (Õhuvägi)

Brigadier-Generals and Commodores

- Märt Tiru
- Alar Laneman
- Urmas Roosimägi
- Peeter Hoppe
- Jaak Tarien (Õhuvägi)

== Officers ==
- Karl Parts
- Viktor Puskar
- Alfons Rebane
- Jaan Usin
- Leo Kunnas
- Harald Riipalu
- Ain-Erwin Mere
- Paul Maitla
- Aleksander Warma; (Merevägi)

== Junior officers ==
- Anton Irv
- Harald Nugiseks
- Julius Kuperjanov
- Artur Sirk
- Jaan Mahlapuu (fighter pilot)

== See also ==
- Military of Estonia
- List of Estonian commanders
- Military of Latvia
- List of former Latvian commanders
- Military of Lithuania
- List of former Lithuanian commanders
