= List of Estonian generals =

This is a near-complete list of Estonian generals in the Estonian Defence Forces, past and present. The list includes senior officers who held the rank of general, lieutenant general, major general and brigadier general in the Estonian Land Forces or the Estonian Air Force and the rank of admiral, vice admiral, rear admiral and commodore in the Estonian Navy.

== List of generals ==
Rank	Name	Born	Died	Notes
Major General	Herbert Brede	1888	1942	VR I/2
General	Aleksander Einseln	1931	2017	Commander of the Estonian Defence Forces
Major General	Harry Hein	1945		
Major General	Otto Heinze	1877	1968	VR I/2, II/2
Major General	Nikolai Helk	1885	1941	
General	Martin Herem	1973		
Brigadier General	Peeter Hoppe	1960		
Major General	Aleksander Jaakson	1892	1942	VR I/3, II/3
Major General	Martin Jervan	1891	1942	VR I/2
Major General	Gustav Jonson	1880	1942	VR II/2, I/3
Brigadier General	Vahur Karus	1974		
Major General	August Kasekamp	1889	1942	VR II/3
Major General	Hugo Kauler	1893	1942	VR I/2
Lieutenant General	Johannes Kert	1959	2021	Commander of the Estonian Defence Forces
Major General	Meelis Kiili	1965		
Major General	Jaan Kruus	1884	1942	VR II/3
Major General	Teo Krüüner	1943		
Major General	Gustav Kunnos	1878	1926	
Major General	Ants Kurvits	1887	1943	VR I/2
Vice Admiral	Tarmo Kõuts	1953		Commander of the Estonian Defence Forces
General	Ants Laaneots	1948		Commander of the Estonian Defence Forces
General	Johan Laidoner	1884	1953	Commander of the Estonian Armed Forces, VR I/1, III/1
Brigadier General	Alar Laneman	1962		
Major General	Andres Larka	1879	1943	VR I/1
Major General	Dimitri Lebedev	1872	1935	
Major General	Hans Leesment	1873	1944	VR III/2
Lieutenant General	Paul Lill	1882	1943	VR I/2
Major General	Artur Lossmann	1877	1972	VR I/2
Major General	Vello Loemaa	1951		
Major General	Jaan Maide	1896	1945	Commander of the Estonian Armed Forces, VR II/3
Lieutenant General	Andrus Merilo	1973		Commander of the Estonian Defence Forces
Major General	Johannes Orasmaa	1890	1943	VR I/2, II/3
Major General	Aleksander Paldrok	1871	1944	VR I/2
Rear Admiral	Johan Pitka	1872	1944	VR I/1
Major General	Aleksander Pulk	1886	1941	VR I/2
Major General	Ludvig Puusepp	1875	1942	
Major General	Ernst Põdder	1879	1932	VR I/1
Lieutenant General	Nikolai Reek	1890	1942	VR I/2, II/2, II/3
Major General	Rudolf Reimann	1884	1946	VR I/1
Major General	Voldemar Rieberg	1886	1952	
Brigadier General	Urmas Roosimägi	1958		
Major General	Tõnis Rotberg	1882	1953	VR I/2
Major General	Valeri Saar	1955		
Commodore	Igor Schvede	1970		
Major General	Aleksander Silberg	1869	1926	
Major General	Indrek Sirel	1970		
Major General	Jaan Soots	1880	1942	VR I/1
Major General	Otto Sternbeck	1884	1941	VR I/2
General	Riho Terras	1967		Commander of the Estonian Defence Forces
Brigadier General	Artur Tiganik	1971		
Brigadier General	Märt Tiru	1947	2005	
Major General	Richard Tomberg	1897	1982	
Major General	August Traksmaa	1893	1942	VR I/3, II/3
Major General	Aleksander Tõnisson	1875	1941	VR I/1
Major General	Juhan Tõrvand	1883	1942	
Major General	Johan Unt	1876	1930	VR I/2, III/2
Major General	Werner Zoege von Manteuffel	1857	1926	VR I/2
Rear Admiral	Hermann von Salza	1885	1946	VR I/3
Major General	Neeme Väli	1965		

== See also ==
- Military of Estonia
- List of Estonian commanders
- List of former Estonian commanders
