= List of former Latvian commanders =

This is a list of the former Latvian commanders, which also includes the Latvian officers who have served in the Imperial Russian Army, Wehrmacht, Waffen SS and the military commanders, who have retired since the restoration of the Republic of Latvia in 1991:

== Superior officers ==
Generals and Admirals

- Andrejs Auzāns (1871-1953)
- Žanis Bahs (1885-1941)
- Jānis Balodis (1881-1965)
- Jezups Baško (1886-1946)
- Krišjānis Berķis (1884-1942)
- Ludvigs Bolšteins (1888-1940)
- Alberts Brambats (1881-1943)
- Andrejs Bubinduss (1891-1942)
- Hermanis Buks (1896-1942)
- Jānis Buivids (1864-1937)
- Arturs Dālbergs (1896-1941)
- Roberts Dambītis (1881-1957)
- Oskars Dankers (1883-1965)
- Arturs Dannebergs (1891-1941)
- Nikolajs Dūze (1891-1951)
- Jānis Ezeriņš (1894-1944)
- Jānis Francis (1877-1956)
- Oto Grosbarts (1895-1944)
- Mārtiņš Hartmanis (1882-1941)
- Jānis Teodors Indāns (1895-1941)
- Martiņš Jeske (1883-1941)
- Aleksandrs Kalējs (1876-1934)
- Bruno Kalniņš (1899-1990)
- Eduards Kalniņš (1876-1964)
- Roberts Klaviņš (1885-1941)
- Rūdolfs Klinsons (1889-1941)
- Andrejs Krustiņš (1884-1941)
- Jānis Kurelis (1882-1954)
- Arvīds Kurše (1896-1953)
- Jānis Lavenieks (1890-1969)
- Jānis Liepiņš (general) (1894-1942)
- Augusts Ernests Misiņš (1863-1940)
- Kārlis Prauls (1895-1941)
- Mārtiņš Peniķis (1874-1964)
- Hugo Rozenšteins (1892-1941)
- Voldemārs Johans Skaistlauks (1892-1972)
- Vilis Spandegs (1890-1941)
- Teodors Spāde (1891 - 1970)
- Verners Tepfers (1893-1958)
- Oto Ūdentiņš (1892-1988)
- Fricis Virsaitis (1892-1943)

Lieutenant Generals and Vice Admirals

- Rūdolfs Bangerskis (1878 - 1958)
- Raimonds Graube (1957-)
- Gaidis Zeibots (1945-)

Major Generals and Rear Admirals

- Juris Maklakovs (1964-)
- Juris Zeibārts (1959-)

Brigadier-Generals and Commodores

- Kārlis Krēsliņš (1945-)
- Juris Kiukucāns (1956-)
- Gundars Ābols (1964-)
- Juris Vectirāns (1953-)

== Senior officers ==
Colonels and Captens

- Kārlis Aperāts (1892 - 1944)
- Frīdrihs Briedis (1888 - 1918)
- Vilis Janums (1894 - 1981)
- Oskars Kalpaks (1882 – 1919)
- Kārlis Lobe (1895 - 1985)
- Voldemārs Ozols (1884 - 1949)
- Jorģis Zemitāns (1873 - 1928)

Lieutenant Colonels and Commanders

- Nikolajs Galdiņš (1902 - 1945)
- Voldemārs Veiss (1899 - 1944)

Majors and Lieutenant Commanders

- Voldemārs Reinholds (1903 - 1986)

== Junior Officers ==
Captens and Lieutenants

- Miervaldis Adamsons (1910 - 1946)
- Žanis Butkus (1906 - 1999)
- Roberts Ancāns (1919 - 1982)
- Roberts Gaigals (1913 - 1982)
- Oskars Perro (1918 - 2003)
- Aleksandrs Grīns (1895 - 1941)

== See also ==
- Military of Latvia
- List of Latvian commanders
- Military of Lithuania
- List of former Lithuanian commanders
- List of Lithuanian commanders
- Military of Estonia
- List of former Estonian commanders
- List of Estonian commanders

Notable fighter pilots
