= Cross of Liberty =

Cross of Liberty may refer to:

- Order of the Cross of Liberty (Finland)
- Cross of Liberty (Estonia)
