= Jaan Lepp =

Estonian track and field athlete and military Lieutenant Colonel

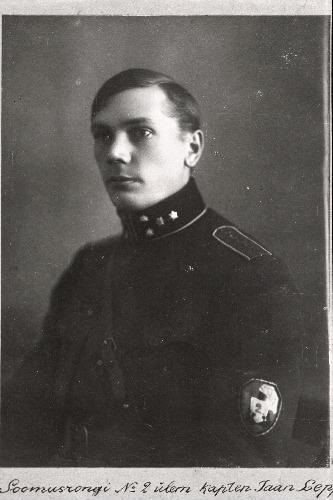
Jaan Lepp in 1920

Jaan Lepp (19 July 1895 Anija Parish, Kreis Harrien – 9 December 1941) was an Estonian track and field athlete, and military lieutenant colonel.

== Military and sports career ==
During World War I, Lepp was a soldier in the Imperial Russian Army. During the Estonian War of Independence, he was the commander of the armoured train No. 2. Lepp subsequently went on to make a career in the Estonian Defence Forces, eventually promoted to Lieutenant Colonel.

In 1918 and 1921 he won one gold and two silver medals at Estonian Athletics Championships (high jump and long jump without running, Estonian: paigalt kaugaushüpe). In 1918 he won the Estonian Bandy Championships.

== Arrest and execution ==
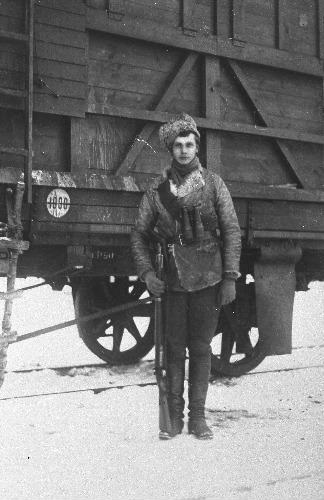
Captain Jaan Lepp, commander of armored train No. 2, during the War of Independence. February 1919

Following the Soviet occupation of Estonia, Jaan Lepp was arrested on 23 July 1940; his removal was personally overseen by communist politician Boris Kumm. Lepp was executed by gunshot in Kirov Oblast, Russian Soviet Federative Socialist Republic on 9 December 1941, aged 46.

== Legacy ==
Under the leadership of Anija Parish, a memorial was erected in 1995 on the grounds of Lepp's farm of Peningi on Lepp's 100th birthday. In 2005, to celebrate Lepp's 110th birthday, he was posthumously awarded the gold medal of the Estonian Football Association.

== Awards ==
- 1920: Cross of Liberty, VR II/3
- 1925: Cross of Liberty, VR II/2
- 1940: Military Order of the Cross of the Eagle, V Class
