= Johan Unt =

Estonian military personnel

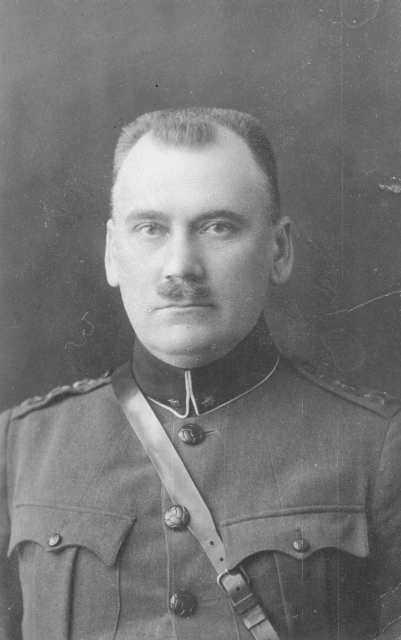
Johan Unt

Johan Unt (24 March 1876 Tarvastu Parish – 7 April 1930 Tallinn) was an Estonian military officer.

In 1901, he graduated from Vilnius Military School. He participated in World War I as part of the Russian Imperial Army. In 1918, during the German occupation, he organized the illegal Estonian Defence League. He participated in the Estonian War of Independence. In 1919–1920, he was the head of the Estonian Defence League. In 1920–1930, he was the commander of the Tallinn Garrison.

On April 4, 1930, an unknown person shot Unt in the back on Kreutzwaldi Street in Tallinn. Unt died from the injuries received at the Tallinn Defence Forces Central Hospital. Major General Johan Unt was buried in the Defence Forces Cemetery of Tallinn accompanied by national tributes. The killer remained undetected.

Awards:

- 1924: Cross of Liberty.
