= E-Arsenal =

Estonian Arms manufacturing company

Eesti Arsenal OÜ
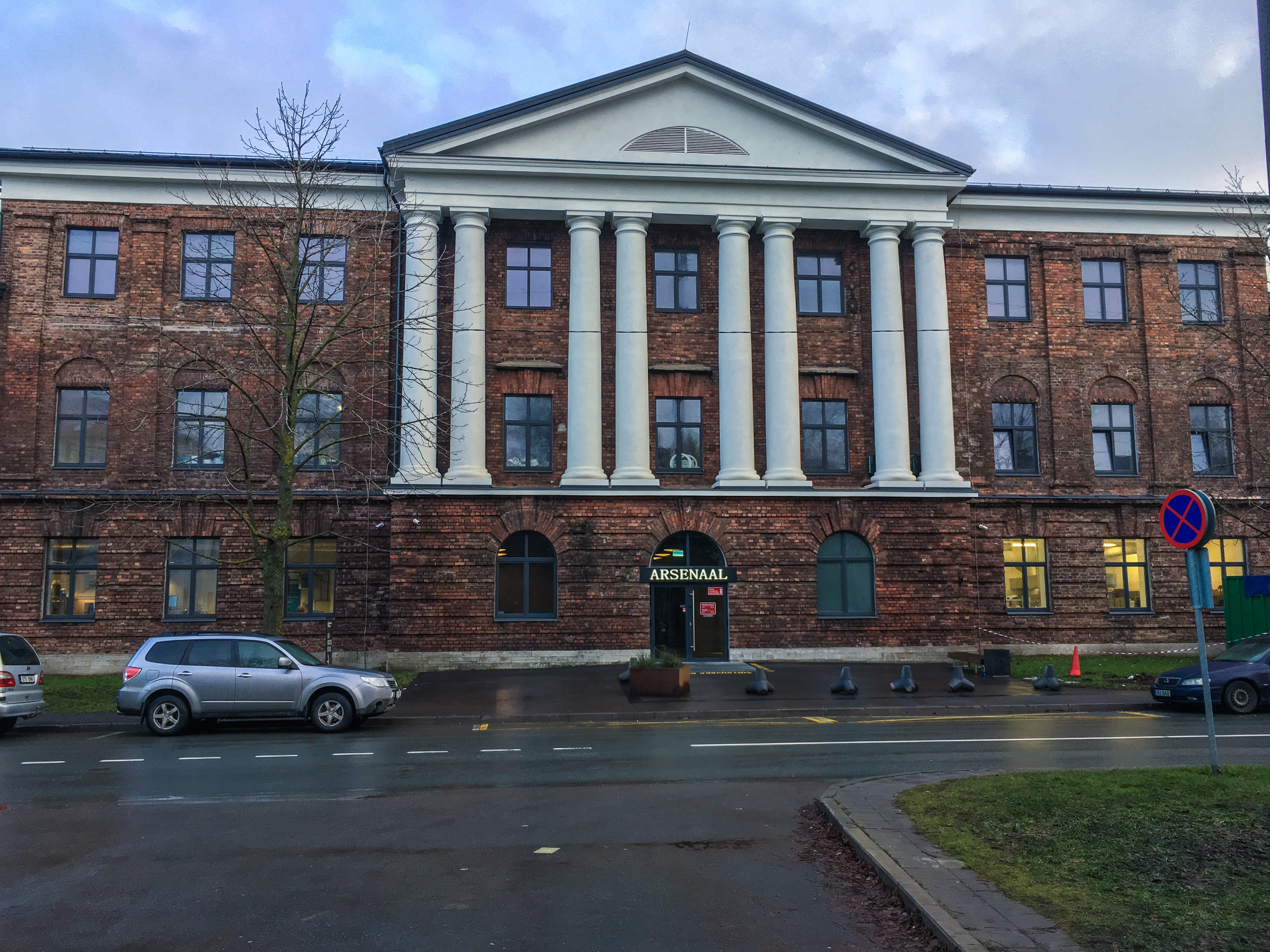
- The former building of Arsenal, Erika tänav 14
- Predecessor: Arsenal (1910 as 'Russian Admiralty Arsenal')
- Founded: 1910; 116 years ago 1994; 32 years ago (post-Soviet occupation)
- Defunct: 2012
- Fate: Liquidation
- Headquarters: Tallinn, Estonia
- Services: Arms Manufacturing
- Website: e-arsenal.ee

E-Arsenal was an Estonian arms manufacturing company operating in Tallinn from 1994 to 2012.

== History ==
In 1910, the electromechanic company Russian Admiralty Arsenal (Estonian: Vene Admiraliteedi Arsenal) was founded.

In 1920, the company was renamed to Arsenal. After the Second World War, Arsenal factories housed a Soviet weapons factory. Aleksander Silberg became the head of Arsenal until 1925.

In 1926, the Arsenal Submachine gun was designed and produced by Arsenal. The Arsenal Crossley (M 27/28) armored car was produced from 1926 to 1928, the engines being produced by Crossley Motors, and 13 being assembled in the Arsenal factory and used in the Estonian Army. Arsenal also had a prototype of the Arsenal Tallinn M1938, which never saw mass production due to the Soviet occupation of the Baltic states.

From 1994 to 2009, a new state-owned company was founded on the foundations of Arsenal, and the company was owned by the Ministry of Defense. In 2009, the company was renamed E-Arsenal.

In 2012, the Ministry of Defense liquidated E-Arsenal.

== Legacy ==
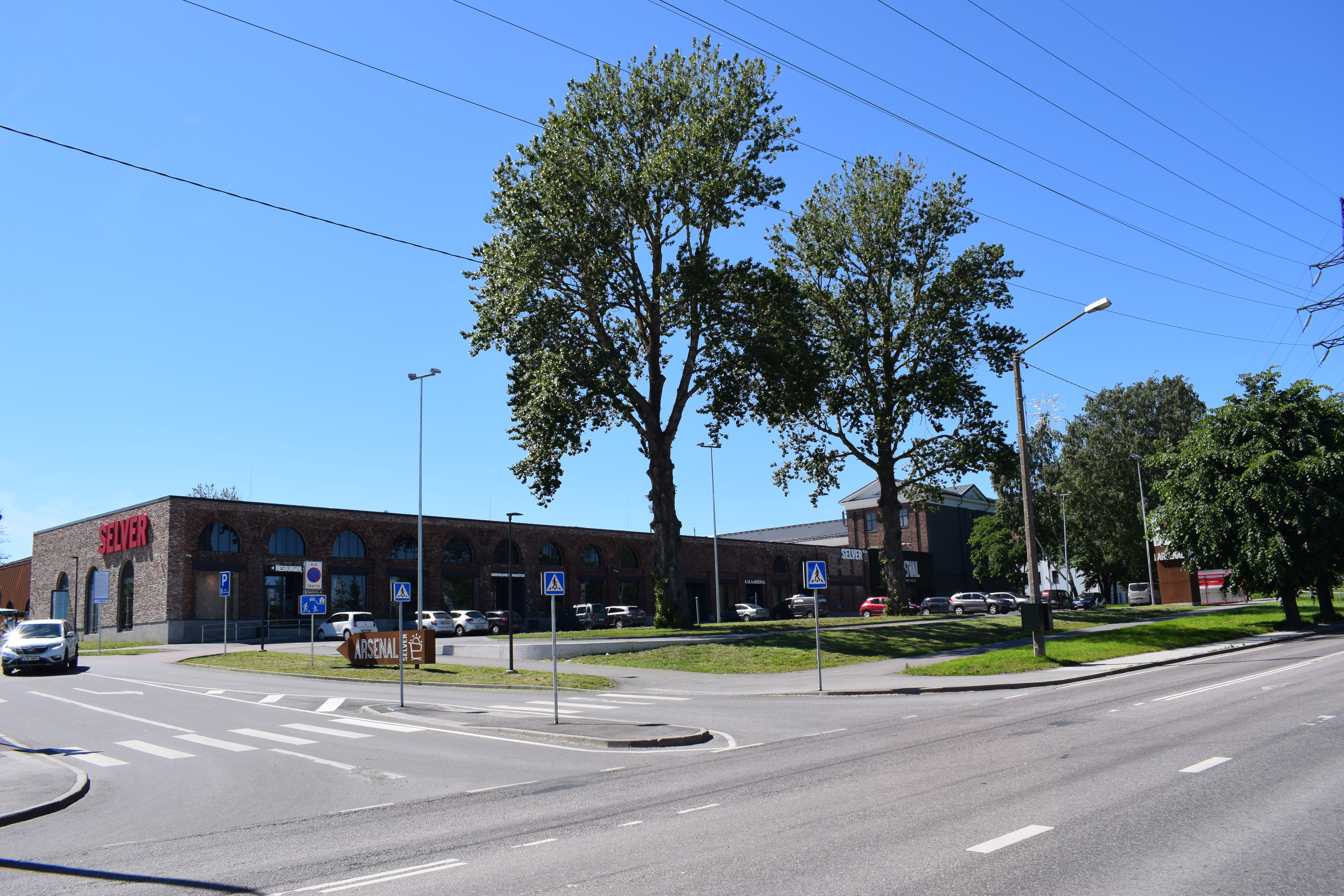
Arsenal Centre, Erika Street 14.

A shopping center, Arsenal Centre (Estonian: Arsenali Keskus), was opened in Põhja-Tallinn on Erika Street in 2016, in the former Arsenal building.
