= Jaan Usin =

Estonian military personnel

Jaan Usin VR II/3 (12 August 1887 – 19 August 1941) was an Estonian Navy commander.

Born in Kihelkonna Parish, Saare County, he later served during World War I in the Imperial Russian Navy as an ensign. During the war he commanded the 28-man crew of the gunboat Tartu. In 1918, he entered in the Estonian service and participated in the Estonian War of Liberation. Since 1920, Jaan Usin was commander of the Peipsi flotilla in Tartu. He rose in ranks and was finally, in 1940, promoted to captain, being then commander of one gunboat, one motorboat and 49 men. During the Soviet occupation he was prisoned for some time but after the outbreak of World War II he was engaged in the Soviet navy as steersman of the icebreaker Merikaru. He was sunk on board Merikaru in the Väinameri, the Muhu strait.
