= Arsenal Crossley =

Type of armored car produced in Estonia

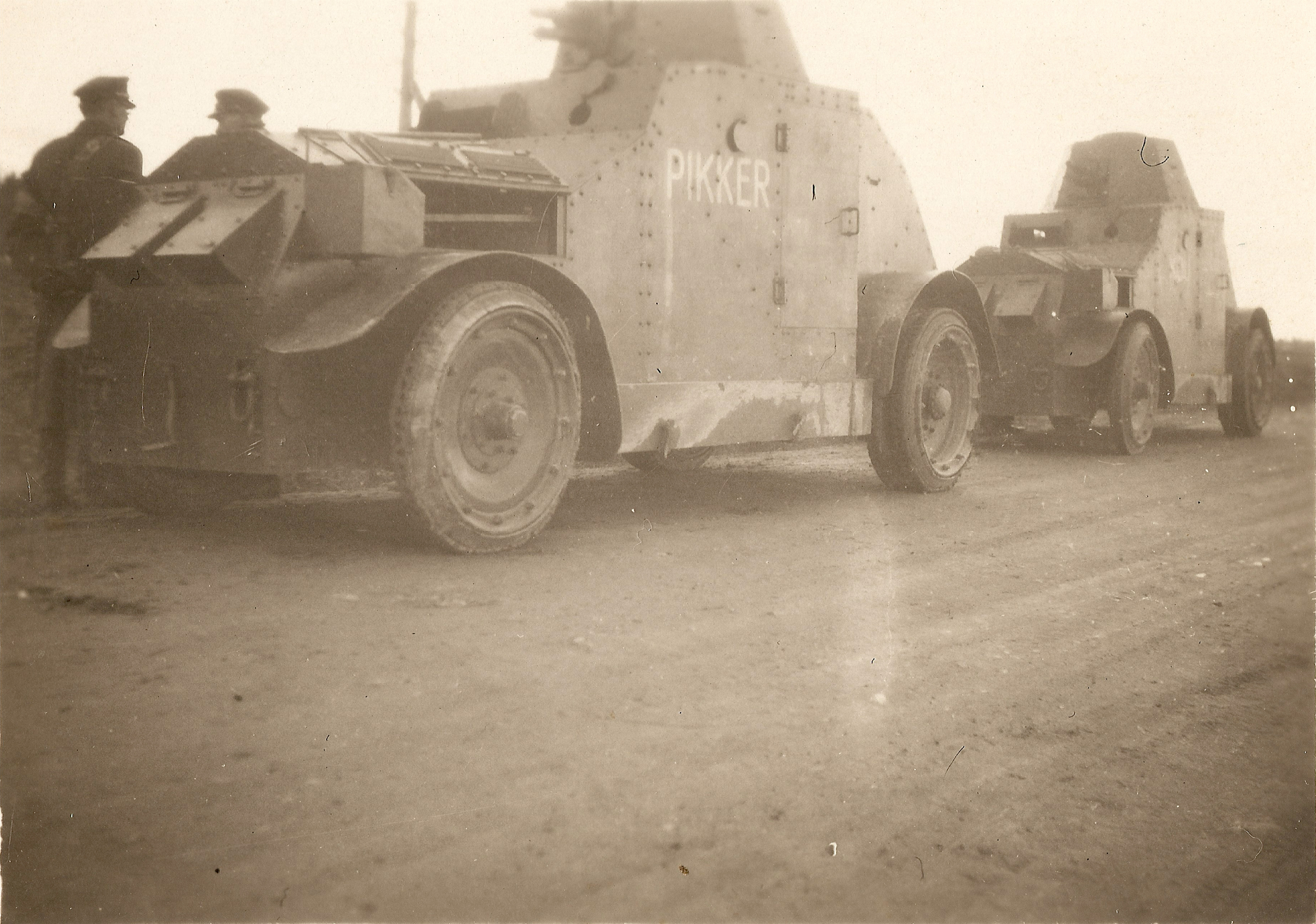
- Estonian armored car Arsenal Crossley.
- Type: Armored car
- Place of origin: Estonia

Service history
- In service: 1926–1940
- Used by: Estonia; Soviet Union
- Wars: World War II

Production history
- Designed: 1924
- Manufacturer: Arsenal
- Produced: 1926–1928
- No. built: 13

Specifications
- Mass: 5.5 tonnes
- Length: 4.87 m (16 ft 0 in)
- Width: 1.80 m (5 ft 11 in)
- Height: 2.43 m (8 ft 0 in)
- Crew: 4 (Commander, gunner, driver, driver)
- Armor: 3–7 mm
- Main armament: 6 with 37 mm Hotchkiss SA and 7 with 7.7mm Madsen machine gun
- Engine: Crossley Motors; 45 hp
- Operational range: 177 km (110 mi)
- Maximum speed: 60 km/h (37 mph)

Arsenal Crossley (also designated as M 27/28) was an Estonian armored car that was operated between 1926 and 1940. At the time it was introduced the Arsenal Crossley was one of the most modern armored vehicles in the Estonian Army. The vehicle's name is the combination of the two factories that contributed to its production. The car was manufactured in Estonia's Arsenal factory, while the engine was provided by the British company Crossley Motors Ltd and the armored plates were ordered from Sweden.

== Development and production ==
The plans for the Arsenal Crossley light armored car were developed in the Estonian War Ministry between 1924 and 1925. As Estonia lacked a car manufacturing industry, the chassis and engine were ordered from a British company, Crossley Motors Ltd, and the armored plates were ordered from Sweden. The cars were to be assembled in the Arsenal arms factory in Tallinn.

The cars were built in two batches: the first five cars were ordered on 25 November 1925, while another eight cars were ordered on 17 February 1927. A total of 13 cars were produced between 1926 and 1928. Seven cars were armed with 7.7 mm Madsen machine guns and six cars had the 37 mm Hotchkiss gun fitted. The armor, which was fitted on the front, sides and back, was 7 mm thick. A further 5 mm of armor was fitted on the top of the car, while 3 mm was attached on the bottom. To protect the crew from splinters caused by non-penetrating hits, the interior was covered with felt and sailcloth and the floor armor was covered with pine boards. The car had semi-pneumatic tires, so that it would not be immobilized if its tires were punctured. With a crew of four, the car weighed about 5.5 tonnes (5.4 long tons; 6.1 short tons) and was able to achieve a maximum speed of 60 km/h (37 mph).

== Operational history ==
Of the cars that were built, the vast majority (11) of them were issued to the Estonian Defence Forces and formed an armored car company with four platoons which was assigned to an Auto-tanki regiment. Each platoon had one car armed with a 37 mm gun and two cars with machine guns. As eight cars with machine guns were needed, one platoon used the War of Independence-era "Pisuhänd" armored car.

The remaining two cars were ordered by the Estonian Defence League and these were delivered in 1927. Both of these cars were armed with 37 mm cannons and were named "Kõu" and "Pikker" (Arsenal Crossley cars in the Estonian Defence Forces had no names). They were assigned to an armored car unit that was a part of the Malev of Tallinn. In 1930 the unit was named "Tallinna maleva üksik soomusautorühm" (single armored car platoon of the Malev of Tallinn) and it remained a part of the Defence League until 1940.

By the middle of 1930, the Estonian armored forces had good infrastructure and decent training but most of the vehicles were outdated. During a Defense Council meeting in 1935, Estonian Defence Forces chief of staff Major-General Nikolai Reek stated that the newly bought TKS tankettes and Arsenal Crossley cars were the only combat capable armored vehicles Estonia possessed (Estonia also had the French Renault FT and British Mark V tanks and some War of Independence-era armored cars). A modernisation program was launched in 1939–1940. All Arsenal Crossley cars were to be upgraded so that they would be armed with 37 mm semi-automatic machine guns along with a 7.7 mm Madsen machine gun which would be mounted next to the driver on the front panel. The crew would also be issued with a Suomi submachine gun and a personal revolver, but this idea was later dropped due to a lack of funds and it was subsequently planned to only re-arm the cars. Nevertheless, this plan never came to fruition as a lack of funds and the occupation of the country by the Soviets in 1940 resulted in it being cancelled.

After the Soviets occupied the country, the Estonian Defence Force was dissolved and most of the Arsenal Crossleys were given to the newly formed 22nd Territorial Rifle Corps. One vehicle (the ex-Defence League "Kõu") was sent to the 942nd Storage Depot in Dvinsk. The ultimate fate of the Arsenal Crossley cars is unknown, but one car can be seen burning alongside a road in a movie scene in a German war chronicle about the capture of Paldiski.

== See also ==
- BA-27 (vehicle of similar period and configuration)
- Samochód pancerny wz. 29 (vehicle of similar period and configuration)
