= Edward Ryan (Red Cross) =

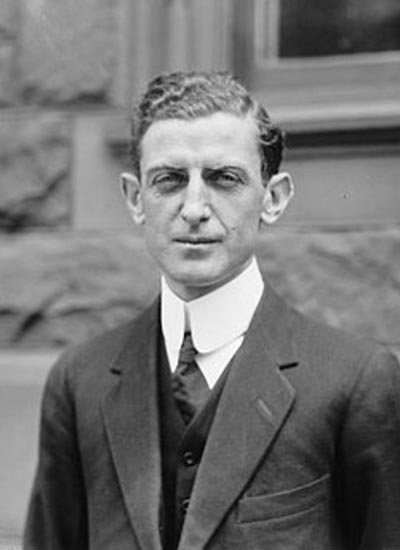
- Ryan around 1917
- Born: December 14, 1883; Scranton, Pennsylvania, U.S.
- Died: September 18, 1923 (aged 39); Tehran, Iran
- Education: Fordham University
- Occupation: Physician
- Employer: Red Cross
- Awards: Cross of Liberty (1920)

Edward W. Ryan (December 14, 1883 – September 18, 1923) was an American physician and Red Cross official, who devoted most of his life to combating epidemics worldwide.

Ryan joined the Red Cross in 1913 to help soldiers and civilians wounded during the Mexican Revolution. There, in Mexico, he was imprisoned and sentenced to death, but was eventually released. He then continued his work for Red Cross in Europe. While heading the American Red Cross mission in Belgrade in 1914–1916, he successfully fought an outbreak of typhus that killed thousands. He later helped containing similar epidemics in Latvia, Lithuania and Estonia in 1919–1922, and was awarded the Cross of Liberty in Estonia in 1920. In late 1922 he was sent to Iran, where he died of a heart disease in 1923.

== Biography ==
Ryan was born in Scranton, Pennsylvania, to a working-class family as the youngest of four children. His father Jeremy Ryan worked at a local factory. While attending public school in Scranton, Ryan worked at a tobacco shop and then at a local newspaper, The Republican. He stayed with ad and news agencies until 1908, when he moved to New York to study medicine at Fordham University. After graduating in 1912 he practiced at Saint Vincent's and Brooklyn County hospitals.

In 1913 Ryan volunteered to go to Mexico to help Americans caught up in the Mexican Revolution. While moving around Mexico, he was captured and imprisoned in Torreón by rebels, who declared him a spy and ordered his execution. The execution was delayed in turmoil, and Ryan was eventually released upon request of the American Embassy.

In August 1914, shortly after the outbreak of World War I, Ryan moved to Europe, arriving in Belgrade in September 1914. There he would drive around the city and rescue civilians wounded by artillery fire. He also helped protecting regular Serbians from military crimes, by hiding them in Red Cross buildings. In December 1914, Belgrade was captured by the Austrian Army. Ryan was imprisoned, but soon released. Later in March 1915, he united major Serbian hospitals to fight the outbreak of typhus, which killed thousands, but was eventually contained.

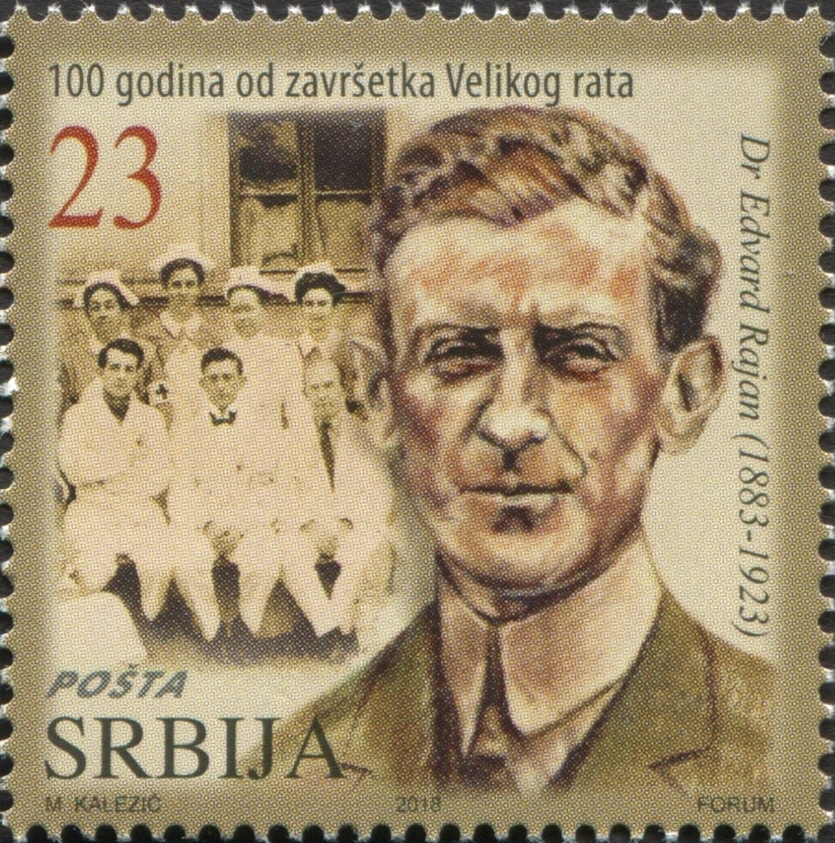
Ryan on a 2018 stamp of Serbia

Ryan was again imprisoned by the Austrians in October 1916, when he left Serbia. While he was traveling through Budapest, a suitcase with his war souvenir, an unexploded artillery shell, fell and exploded, damaging the Budapest train station. Ryan convinced the police that the accident occurred by negligence, and was released.

In March 1917, Ryan moved to France, to coordinate the work of several front-line hospitals. A month later, the United States entered the war, and Ryan was redirected to fight malaria in Greece. In November 1918, he was promoted to lieutenant-colonel, and sent to Berlin as a deputy head of the American Red Cross mission in Germany. From 1919 to 1922 he moved around Finland, Estonia, Latvia and Lithuania, bringing medical supplies, establishing Red Cross offices, and fighting new outbreaks of the typhus. For his efforts he was awarded the Cross of Liberty of the 1st degree in Estonia in 1920.

Ryan returned to the U.S. in August 1922, only to be summoned to Iran several months later. There he caught malaria, and died of a heart disease.
