= 182nd Rifle Division =

182nd Rifle Division (September 13, 1940 - July 1945)
- Active: 1940–1945
- Country: Soviet Union
- Branch: Red Army
- Type: Infantry
- Size: Division
- Engagements: Operation Barbarossa; Leningrad strategic defensive Demyansk Pocket; Demyansk Offensive (1943); Operation Polar Star; Leningrad–Novgorod offensive Staraya Russa-Novorzhev offensive Pskov-Ostrov offensive Baltic offensive Riga offensive (1944); Battle of Memel; East Prussian offensive Samland offensive
- Battle honours: Dno

Commanders
- Notable commanders: Maj. Gen. Jaan Kruus; Col. Mikhail Semyonovich Nazarov; Maj. Gen. Vladislav Vikentevich Korchits; Col. Vasilii Mitrofanovich Shatilov; Col. Mikhail Vladimirovich Fyodorov

The 182nd Rifle Division was formed as an infantry division of the Red Army, following the Soviet occupation of the Baltic states, based on the shtat (table of organization and equipment) of September 13, 1939, and utilizing the personnel of two divisions of the Estonian People's Army.

At the outbreak of war with Germany, it was still in Estonia, part of the 22nd Rifle Corps of Northwestern Front's (former Baltic Special Military District) 27th Army. It quickly lost strength, both due to combat losses and to the desertion of large numbers of ethnic Estonians from the ranks. The remainder concentrated near Porkhov by the beginning of July. During that month the 182nd, now under command of 11th Army, took part in the counterstroke at Soltsy against LVI Motorized Corps, and a further action near Staraya Russa in August, both of which slowed the advance of Army Group North toward Leningrad.

During 1942 and 1943, under 11th, 27th, and 34th Armies, the division would repeatedly attempt to regain Staraya Russa, while the battles for Demyansk went on to its east through most of this period. The evacuation of the Demyansk salient in February 1943 freed up German forces to reinforce a much shorter line, which stymied Marshal G. K. Zhukov's Operation Polar Star.

The front began to move again during the Leningrad-Novgorod Offensive in January/February 1944; Staraya Russa finally fell after holding out for over 30 months and near the end of February, the 182nd, now under command of 1st Shock Army in 2nd Baltic Front, won an honorific for its part in the liberation of Dno. At the start of the summer, offensive into the Baltic states, it was in 22nd Army, still in 2nd Baltic (although very briefly in 3rd Baltic Front). It was under these commands at it advanced through Latvia, and into northern Lithuania, before being transferred to 43rd Army of 1st Baltic Front in late September. It was almost immediately involved in this Army's rapid advance on Memel, which was reached on October 10.

It was impossible to take this heavily fortified city with the means at hand, so the 182nd went over to the defense on the border of East Prussia. When the winter offensive began, the division was soon involved in the fighting for Tilsit, and two of its rifle regiments would receive decorations. Following this, it pushed through to the Kurisches Haff, and began isolating the German forces in Königsberg. It played little part in the eventual capture of this city, but in April, as part of 2nd Guards Army, it was involved in the clearing of the Samland Peninsula. In the last days of the war, the 182nd returned to 43rd Army, now in 2nd Belorussian Front. It would be disbanded in July.

== Formation ==
The division was formed between August 29 and September 13, 1940, based on the 3rd and 4th Estonian Infantry Divisions of the Estonian People's Army (former Estonian Defence Forces). The personnel continued to wear Estonian uniforms, now with Soviet insignia, and the division was largely equipped with British imports. It was soon assigned to the 22nd Rifle Corps, which also contained the 180th Rifle Division, also of Estonians. Its order of battle on June 22, 1941, was as follows:

- 140th Rifle Regiment
- 171st Rifle Regiment
- 232nd Rifle Regiment
- 625th Artillery Regiment
- 626th Howitzer Artillery Regiment (until October 1, 1941)
- 14th Antitank Battalion (until October 1, 1941, then from September 20, 1942)
- 138th Antiaircraft Battalion (until October 1, 1941); 23rd Antiaircraft Battalion (October 10, 1941 - February 5, 1942); 23rd Antiaircraft Battery (February 5, 1942 - June 28, 1942); 322nd Antiaircraft Battery (June 28, 1942 - March 25, 1943)
- 108th Reconnaissance Company (later 108th Reconnaissance Battalion)
- 201st Sapper Battalion (later 493rd)
- 9th Signal Battalion (later 897th Signal Company)
- 1st Medical/Sanitation Battalion
- 181st Chemical Defense (Anti-gas) Company
- 382nd Motor Transport Company
- 354th Field Bakery
- 147th Divisional Veterinary Hospital
- 1452nd Field Postal Station
- 690th Field Office of the State Bank

Maj. Gen. Jaan Kruus, who had previously led the 2nd Estonian Infantry Division, was appointed to command, having been transferred to the Red Army in August. On June 3, 1941, he was dismissed from his post, being replaced by Col. Ivan Ignatevich Kuryshev. Kruus was arrested on July 17, and on April 22, 1942, he was condemned to death for "participation in a counter-revolutionary conspiratorial organization." The sentence was carried out by a firing squad on May 15 in Moscow. He would be posthumously rehabilitated on July 5, 1963. Kuryshev had previously led the 10th Airborne Brigade.

== Defense of Leningrad ==
As the 22nd Corps moved to its concentration area near Porkhov it was removed from 27th Army and came under direct command of the Front. By July 10 it had been subordinated to 11th Army of the same Front.

=== Counterstroke at Soltsy ===
At this time the LVI Motorized Corps of 4th Panzer Group, supported by infantry of the I Army Corps, was advancing along the Luga axis through Soltsy toward Novgorod. The 8th Panzer Division, in the vanguard, penetrated 30-40km along the Shimsk road, and reached the town of Soltsy late on July 13. Here it was halted by spirited resistance from the 177th Rifle Division and the 10th Mechanized Corps, skilfully exploiting the difficult terrain. By nightfall the panzers found themselves isolated from the 3rd Motorized Division to its left and the 3rd SS Totenkopf Division lagging in the rear.

Alert for opportunities to strike back, the STAVKA ordered a counterstroke against the overexposed German force. This was communicated to Marshal K. Ye. Voroshilov, who in turn directed 11th Army to attack along the Soltsy-Dno axis with two shock groups. The northern group consisted of the 10th Mechanized's 21st Tank Division and the two divisions of 16th Rifle Corps, with reinforcements. The southern group consisted of the 183rd, 182nd, and 180th Rifle Divisions, gathered together under 22nd Corps, and was to attack 8th Panzer from the east, with Kuryshev's men moving against the panzer's communication lines to the southwest. The assault, launched in oppressive 32 degree C summer heat and massive clouds of dust, caught 8th Panzer and 3rd Motorized totally by surprise. The two divisions were soon isolated from one another and 8th Panzer was forced to fight a costly battle in encirclement for four days. It also disrupted the German offensive plans by forcing 4th Panzer Group to divert 3rd SS from the Kingisepp and Luga axes to rescue the beleaguered panzer division. In his memoirs the commander of LVI Corps, Gen. E. von Manstein, wrote:

Our corps' position at that moment was hardly an enviable one, and we could not help wondering whether we had taken rather too great a risk this time... As matters stood, the only course open to us was to pull 8 Panzer Division back through [S]oltsy to escape the encirclement that now threatened... The next days proved critical, with the enemy straining every nerve to keep up his encirclement and throwing in, besides his rifle divisions, two armoured divisions enjoying strong artillery and air support. 8 Panzer Division nevertheless managed to break through [S]oltsy to the west and re-group, despite having to be temporarily supplied from the air.

The Soltsy counterstroke cost 8th Panzer 70 of its 150 tanks destroyed or damaged and represented the first, albeit temporary, success achieved by Soviet forces on the path to Leningrad. It also cost the German command a precious week to regroup and resume the advance. However, the cost to the Soviet forces was high. On July 17, Kuryshev left his command to return to the airborne forces, where he remained for the rest of the war, eventually being promoted to the rank of major general. Col. Mikhail Semyonovich Nazarov took over the 182nd.

=== Counterstroke at Staraya Russa ===
The STAVKA, as well as Marshal Voroshilov, now the commander of the Northwest Direction, were well aware that Army Group North would soon renew its advance. The STAVKA allocated reinforcements, and dictated a plan to Voroshilov, which stated in part:

2. Employ the 34th, 48th, and 11th Armies to conduct this operation...
4. Conduct your main attack with the 34th Army and a simultaneous attack by the 11th Army's left flank in the direction of Vzgliady and the 48th Army along the Utorgosh and Peski axis... The offensive by all armies will begin on the morning of 12 August.

The plan for the offensive, worked out by Lt. Gen. N. F. Vatutin, was overambitious. Northwestern Front's 48th, 34th, 27th, and 11th Armies were to launch simultaneous and concentric attacks on the X Army Corps of German 16th Army, which was defending at Staraya Russa. 11th Army, led by Lt. Gen. V. I. Morozov, along with 27th and 34th Armies were to strike westward south of Lake Ilmen. The overall objective was to cut off and destroy X Corps and subsequently recapture Soltsy, Dno, and Kholm.

While the attack was carefully prepared, the outcome was uneven, mostly due to the fact that the German formations themselves attacked toward Novgorod and eastward from Staraya Russa on August 10. This set 11th and 48th Armies back on the wrong foot, but the Front's offensive went ahead anyway on August 12, with mixed results. X Corps was indeed enveloped by 34th Army, but the frontal attack by 11th Army soon faltered. Manstein had the 3rd Motorized and Totenkopf restored to his command and on August 19 these launched a counterattack which restored communications to X Corps and by August 25 had driven the two Armies back to the line of the Lovat River. 11th Army lost roughly 30 percent of its personnel and perhaps 80 percent of its weapons. However, the venture had delayed the German advance on Leningrad by another 10 days. On August 23 Northwestern Front had come under command of Lt. Gen. P. A. Kurochkin.

== Demyansk Pocket ==
16th Army, which had a low priority for supplies and manpower, may have been well-advised to remain on the line of the Lovat, but a series of pinprick attacks from the Valdai Hills enticed it to continue its advance eastward. 34th Army was so weak that it could do little to contest the advance of II Army Corps and LVI Motorized toward Demyansk, although 11th and 27th Armies continued to hold positions on the flanks. In early September von Manstein's Corps took Demyansk, but it was now in the ludicrous position of being at the end of a single supply line consisting of a 90km dirt road from the railhead at Staraya Russa. The panzers were soon withdrawn to reinforce the upcoming advance on Moscow, and in early October the X and II Corps again tried to push east from Staraya Russa and Demyansk, but all they gained was more trackless wilderness that was difficult to defend. These efforts were finally halted as the first snow fell, and 16th Army ordered its troops to dig defenses for the winter. Over the next two months a stalemate settled over the front from Lake Ilmen to Lake Seliger. Northwestern Front, battered but not broken, was not immediately in a position to take the initiative. The headquarters of 22nd Rifle Corps was disbanded on September 22, but the 182nd had already come under direct command of 11th Army in August.

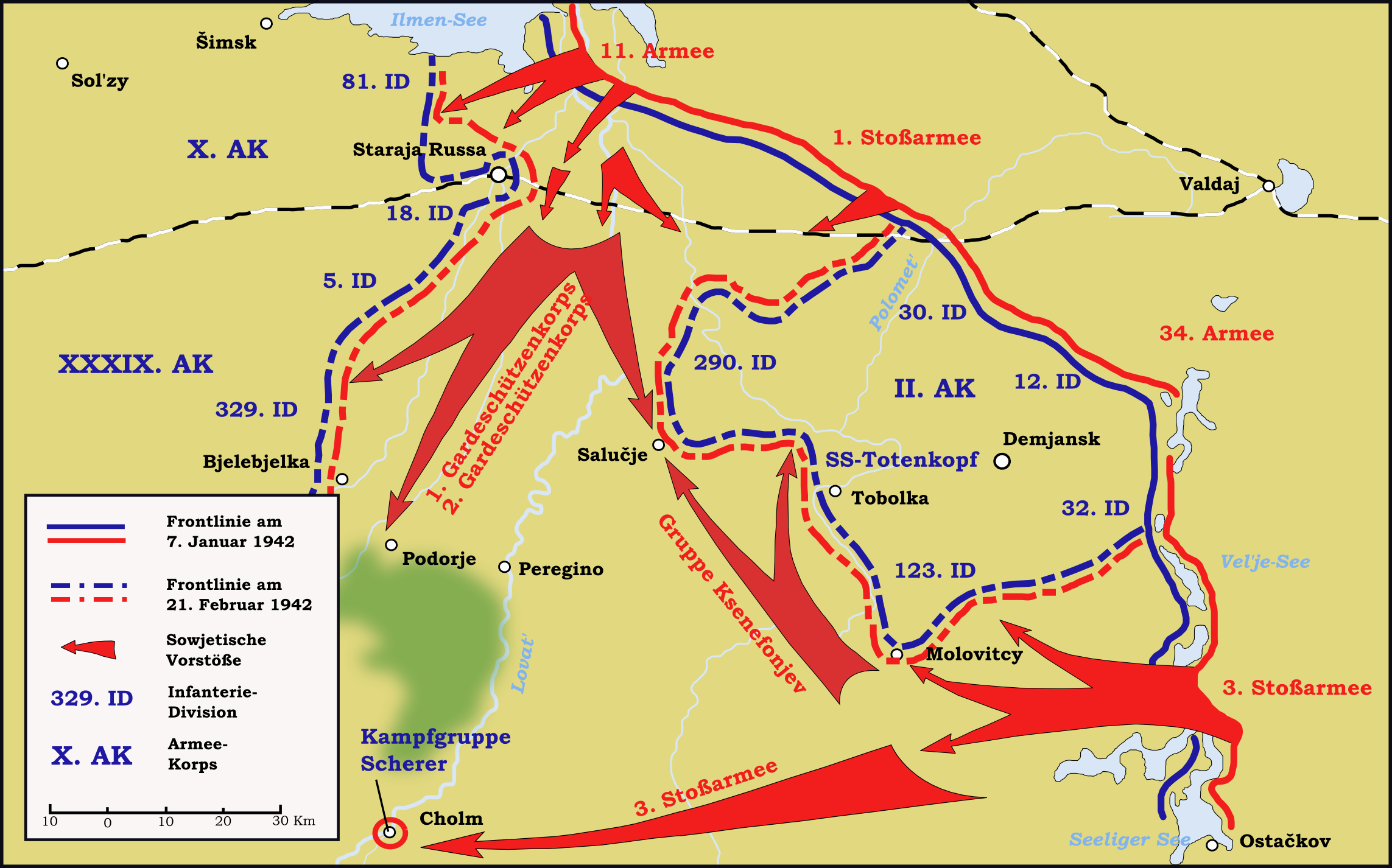
Northwestern Front's counteroffensive. Note positions of 11th Army in the north.

The Red Army's winter counteroffensive began in early December, and it soon became clear that 16th Army was in a precarious position. The weakest point was the boundary between Army Groups North and Center near Ostashkov. To the STAVKA it also seemed that the area south of Lake Ilmen could be used for cost-effective attacks to draw German reserves from Leningrad and Moscow. Kurochkin and his staff began planning on December 18 for a counteroffensive to begin on January 6-7, 1942. Morozov's Army had about 35,000 personnel in five rifle divisions (84th, 180th, 182nd, 188th and 254th), with very limited artillery, but was reinforced with about 90 tanks prior to the counteroffensive, including 15 KV-1s and 30 T-34s. As an example of the shortages, the riflemen of the 182nd received about 100 rounds of ammunition and two hand grenades each, only enough for the first day of fighting. Food was also in short supply. On the German side, the two German Corps relied on a series of strongpoints rather than a continuous line, especially around Demyansk. The weakest aspect was that the 123rd and 290th Infantry Divisions on the flanks had been assigned exceptionally long sectors without any tactical reserves.

11th Army began the northern part of the counteroffensive on January 7, before 3rd and 4th Shock Armies were ready to attack near Lake Seliger. The 290th Infantry had fortified the village of Vzvad near the mouth of the Lovat, as well as a series of observation posts along the river's west bank, anchored on a battalion-sized strongpoint at Tulitovo. This might have been adequate before the winter freeze, but Morozov's forces now had many more movement options, including Lake Ilmen itself. The Army's shock groups were based on the 180th and 188th Divisions. At 2120 hours one of the observation posts reported that Red Army ski troops were across the Lovat. There was no artillery preparation, and the infiltrating troops moved southwest down the valley of the Redya River, which was about 8km in length. By dawn over 4,000 had crossed the Lovat, bypassing the observation posts and heading toward Staraya Russa; by 1000 the garrison of Vzvad had been cut off by elements of the 182nd and 84th Divisions, before they moved on to threaten to envelop Staraya Russa from the north. Meanwhile, the badly depleted 18th Motorized Division, along with the reconnaissance battalion of Totenkopf were assigned to hold the town.

=== Battles for Staraya Russa ===
Overnight on January 10/11 the 188th Division cut the road from Demyansk to Staraya Russa and brought the latter's airstrip under fire. Morozov now had three divisions outside the town, facing a garrison of 6,500 troops holding a 31km-long perimeter, about 30 percent of which were construction or Air Force personnel. It was fairly well equipped with artillery, but was not prepared for an all-round defense. 11th Army began to invest the town on January 12. A shock group from 84th Division, including three ski battalions, circled around it before approaching the undefended northwest corner on the morning of January 13. This surprise move cut the main road to Shimsk and the rail line, and two battalions entered the town itself, but a violent counterattack by artillerymen and rear troops managed to drive them out with heavy losses. Nevertheless, the garrison was almost completely encircled and forced to rely on air supply. Morozov's next move was to bring up substantial artillery of his own, mostly 76mm field guns, and begin a heavy bombardment, including some 2,000-2,500 shells on January 17 alone. On January 25, Colonel Nazarov left the 182nd. Within weeks he was given command of the 163rd Rifle Division, but left this command a few months later, when he suffered a severe leg fracture. He remained in the training establishment for the duration, being promoted to the rank of major general on January 17, 1944. The new commander of the division was Col. Vladislav Vikentevich Korchits. This Polish officer had survived the Great Purge, and had previously led the 245th Rifle Division.

By the end of the month the 11th Army still had Staraya Russa in a fairly tight pocket, but the town was never completely enveloped. Morozov requested reinforcements from the STAVKA as he settled into siege operations. In order to show some success he ordered an attack to finish off the garrison at Vzvad, which was very near the end of its rope. On January 20, this force had been given permission to evacuate, and made a march of 17km in -50 degree C temperatures across Lake Ilmen to reach friendly positions near Staraya Russa.

The 32km-wide penetration down the Redya valley gave Morozov the opportunity to exploit to the south with the arriving 1st Guards Rifle Corps. This happened in piecemeal fashion with two rifle brigades on February 2, followed by the 7th Guards Rifle Division, all moving toward Davidovo. It was clear to both Morozov and Kurochkin that Staraya Russa was too well defended to take by storm, but there was now an excellent opportunity to surround II Corps at Demyansk. By February 8 the 1st Guards Corps had taken the village of Ramushevo on the Lovat, cutting the only road into Demyansk, forcing the near-encircled German force to rely entirely on airlift for supplies. Meanwhile the remainder of 11th Army, including the 182nd, maintained the near-encirclement of Staraya Russa. On February 12, the 1st Shock Army began arriving south of the town and began advancing westward toward the Polist River in an effort to complete its encirclement and liberation. During February 15-19 the arrival of 5th Jäger Division delayed this advance. On February 25 the encirclement of II Corps was completed.

Despite this, by mid-March it was apparent that Northwestern Front had run out of steam. 11th and 1st Shock Armies were still constrained by supply lines run mostly over frozen peat bogs all the way to Valdai, the closest railhead, 110km in the rear. In fact, the Front's troops were hardly in better shape for food and ammunition than the German forces they had fully or partially encircled. For Operation Brückenschlag, the attempt to break the encirclement of II Corps, which began on March 21, the X Corps provided 90 captured Vickers machine guns to the partly-equipped Corps Group Seydlitz, which had almost certainly been taken from 180th and 182nd Divisions. 11th Army transferred three divisions to the Lovat in an effort to prevent Seydlitz from breaking through, but this did not include the 182nd. Ground communications were finally restored on April 21, although II Corps would continue to require air supply over the following 11 months. From the start of Kurochkin's counteroffensive to the end of Brückenschlag his Front had taken 245,000 casualties, including 88,908 dead or missing, while the two German Corps had lost 63,000, of which 17,000 were dead or missing.

By the end of May the front lines of Northwestern Front finally settled, for the most part, along the Lovat River. During the remainder of 1942, four further efforts were made to retake Staraya Russia: May 3-20; July 17-24; August 10-21; and September 15-16. All of these involved the 182nd, and none of them achieved any real success, apart from tying down German 16th Army and preventing any transfer of reserves to aid 18th Army at Leningrad. During May the division returned to 27th Army, still in Northwestern Front. Colonel Korchits was promoted to the rank of major general on August 4, but on August 29 he left the division and was replaced by Col. Vasilii Mitrofanovich Shatilov. Korchits would be transferred to the Polish Army of the East in May 1944 and would end the war as chief of staff of that Army, with the rank of lieutenant general. Shatilov had been the chief of staff of the 200th Rifle Division. By the end of the year the 182nd had been reduced to a strength of just 2,000 personnel, and it was withdrawn to Parfino for rebuilding early in the new year.

=== Operation Polar Star ===
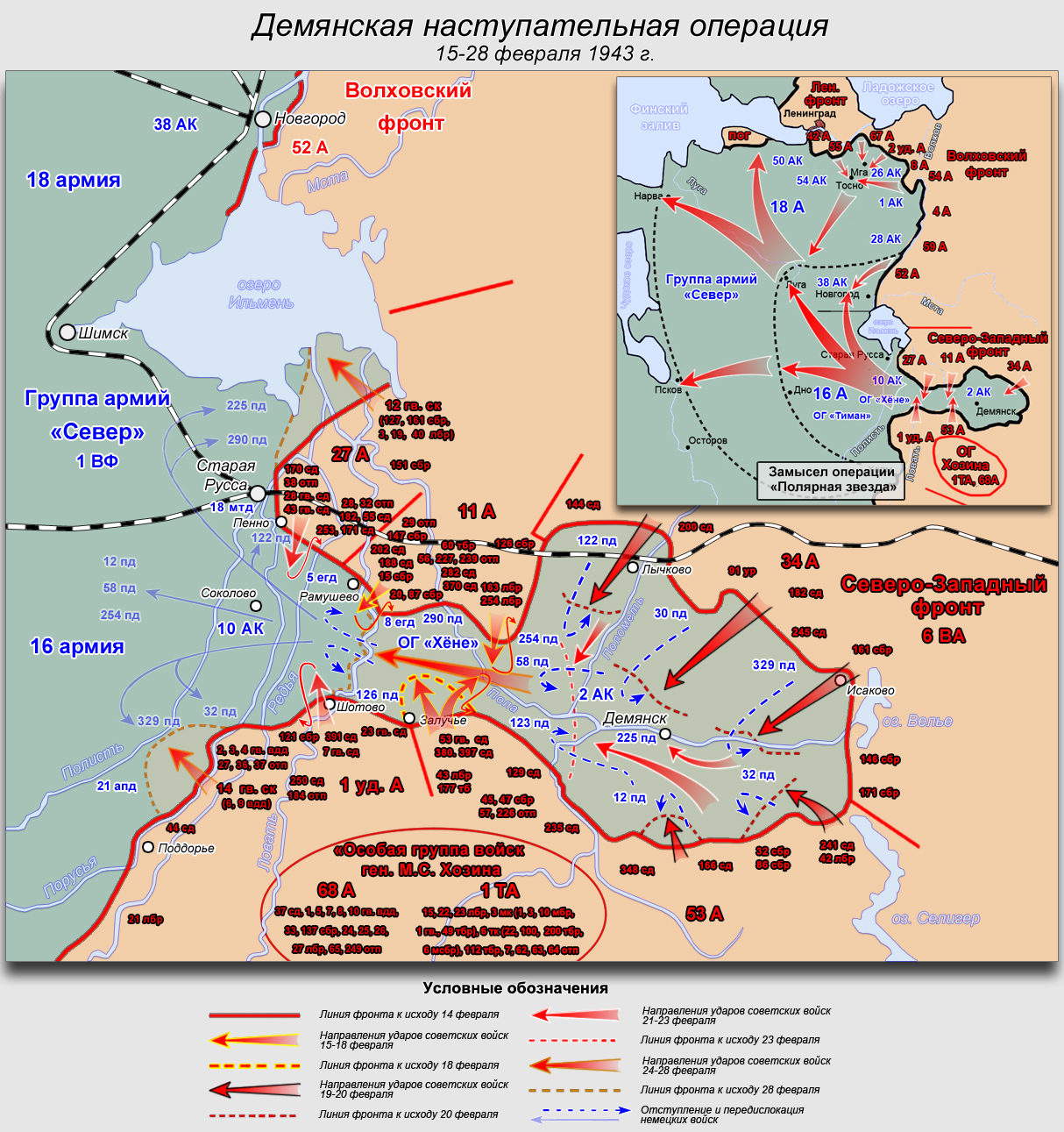
Soviet positions at Demyansk, February 1943. The 182nd was north of the entrance to the Ramushevo corridor.

While the division was rebuilding it was under command of 34th Army, but when it came back to the front on February 11, 1943, it returned to 27th Army. In the wake of Operation Iskra, which broke the German land blockade of Leningrad in January, Marshal G. K. Zhukov conceived a plan to encircle and destroy Army Group North: Operation Polar Star. The first phase of the overall operation would be yet another attempt to cut off and eliminate the Demyansk salient. Zhukov finalized his plan during the week preceding the intended attack date of February 15, and the 11th and 27th Armies together had nine rifle divisions, including the 182nd, plus 150 tanks, massed between Penno and Ramushevo against 5th Jäger Division. However, in light of the encirclement and upcoming surrender of 6th Army at Stalingrad, on January 31 Hitler had authorized the evacuation of II Corps. Operation Ziethen began on February 17 before the delayed Soviet attack could get fully underway, and effectively short-circuited Zhukov's entire plan; 27th Army would still be redeploying as late as the 21st. Demyansk was abandoned on February 21 and by February 26 most of the corridor was evacuated as well.

During this fighting, on February 23, Sen. Lt. Pyotr Ivanovich Shlyuykov distinguished himself sufficiently to be made a Hero of the Soviet Union. Serving as the deputy commander of the 171st Rifle Regiment's mortar company, he was the first man to enter a German trench, and led his men to take a strongpoint. While holding off counterattacks all his comrades were put out of action, but despite being injured himself he was able to repel the attacks until reinforcements arrived. On March 31 he would receive his Gold Star. His injuries forced him to leave the Red Army in 1944, after which he lived in Velikiye Luki. After the war he served in several Communist Party offices after graduating from a Party school in 1950. He died and was buried at Velikiye Luki on January 22, 1957, at the age of 34.

==== Further battles for Staraya Russa ====
Zhukov was determined that his plan was fundamentally sound, and so recommended to the STAVKA a modified version to be carried out in March. Northwestern Front was to begin its attack on March 4, with 27th and 1st Shock Armies directed to take Staraya Russa and reach the Polist. If successful, a group of four Armies, including 1st Tank Army, were to exploit toward Pskov and Narva. This effort proved as fruitless as those previous; the attack was delayed by 24 hours and made almost no progress at all. On March 7 the STAVKA ordered 1st Tank Army to the south in response to the German successes in the Third Battle of Kharkov, and the planned exploitation was abandoned. A week later, 27th Army again struck the defenses east of Staraya Russa, but this failed miserably with heavy losses. The STAVKA finally ordered the offensive shut down on March 17 and Zhukov was sent to the south to deal with the situation there. He was soon followed by some of Northwestern Front's best units, as the evacuation of Demyansk freed up Red Army forces as well as German. The 182nd remained on the defensive for the remainder of the year, returning to 34th Army on April 3 as 27th Army began moving south as well. On November 15 it was reassigned to 1st Shock Army, which was part of 2nd Baltic Front.

== Leningrad–Novgorod Offensive ==
In the planning for the January 1944 offensive against Army Group North the priority was on Leningrad and Volkhov Front's effort to drive 18th Army away from Leningrad and finally end the bombardment of the city. The initial task for 2nd Baltic was to pin down the forces of 16th Army, although two of its Armies were currently in pursuit of German forces north of Nevel, and 1st Shock, with a strength of 54,900 personnel, was intended to play an offensive role.

The main offensive began on January 14. On January 19 elements of 22nd Army captured a section of the railroad between Novosokolniki and Dno, cutting an important line of communications to Staraya Russa. On February 1 the STAVKA gave orders to transfer 1st Shock to Volkhov Front in order to strengthen that Front's drive toward Luga. The Front commander, Army Gen. K. A. Meretskov, chose to attempt to penetrate the German defenses south of Staraya Russa with 1st Shock while the main forces of the Front carried out an encirclement near Luga. The Army was to envelop and destroy the left-flank forces of 16th Army on cooperation with Soviet 8th Army. Initially, 1st Shock made little progress to its objective of cutting the road from Kholm to Staraya Russa, gaining only 4km from the 21st Luftwaffe Field Division. The Army was thinly spread, with just four rifle divisions and one brigade on a 100km-wide sector. The 182nd had by now been organized on a reduced shtat: each rifle company had its personnel cut from 160 to 103 with just two platoons. Each platoon, however, had six LMGs, so retained nearly the same firepower as previously.

21st Luftwaffe was reinforced on February 2 by elements of 30th Infantry Division, two batteries of assault guns the following day, and on February 8-9 by the 15th SS Division (1st Latvian). Meretzkov ordered 1st Shock to continue its offensive on February 5 but this gained just 4km by February 15 before stumbling to a halt from exhaustion. On February 14 the Army had returned to 2nd Baltic Front when Volkhov Front was disbanded, and within days the 182nd had become part of the 14th Guards Rifle Corps.

=== Battle for Dno ===
Despite the crawling pace of 1st Shock's advance, the position of 16th Army at Staraya Russa was clearly untenable and on February 17 Field Marshal W. Model, the new commander of Army Group North, ordered it be evacuated by its German garrison the next day. The town was finally liberated by elements of 1st Shock after two-and-a-half years of struggle. 1st Shock began a pursuit of X Corps which gained 25-45km by late on February 20, hooking up with Leningrad Front's 54th Army. The German withdrawal continued over the next few days, making temporary halts on previously prepared defensive positions. One of these was a north-south rail line from Dno to Nasvy. Dno was a vital point in the German defense, and Model concentrated 8th Jäger Division, a regiment of 21st Luftwaffe, and two security regiments within the city, with 30th Infantry to its south. The first converging attack by 14th Guards Corps and 111th Rifle Corps of 54th Army on February 23 was defeated by counterattacks, but the following day the 182nd, with the 137th Rifle Brigade and 37th Tank Regiment, plus two divisions of 111th Corps, assaulted the city and took it. In recognition, the division was awarded a battle honor:

DNO... 182nd Rifle Division (Colonel Shatilov, Vasilii Mitrofanovich)... The troops who participated in the liberation of Dno, by the order of the Supreme High Command of 24 February, 1944, and a commendation in Moscow, are given a salute of 12 artillery salvoes from 124 guns.

The Front exploited its successes on February 26. The 14th Guards Corps and the 208th Rifle Division of 54th Army forced the Shelon River northwest of Dedovichi, crushed German resistance on the river's west bank and advanced up to 12km, capturing the Logovino–Novyi Krivets sector of the road from Porkhov to Chikhachevo; the defending 30th Infantry and 21st Luftwaffe divisions were forced to pull back quickly to the west and Porkhov was liberated the same day. As the pursuit continued 1st Shock advanced up to 22km on February 27 and the key town of Pustoshka was taken. The STAVKA ordered 2nd Baltic to continue its advance without regrouping but the German VIII and XXXXIII Army Corps joined up and intensified their resistance opposite the 1st Shock and 22nd Armies and successfully withdrew their forces across the Velikaya River. Although 1st Shock advanced 40km by the end of the day on February 29 and cut the Pskov-Opochka rail line, in the first days of March it was forced to go over to the defense.

=== Against the Panther Line ===
The 182nd had now run into the defenses of the Panther Line. On March 3, the STAVKA representatives to 1st and 2nd Baltic Fronts put forward a plan to destroy the German forces between Ostrov and Idritsa, which included the following:

... 1st Shock Army will attack along the Pskov-Idritsa railroad toward Pushkinskiye Gory and Opochka with three rifle divisions and one rifle brigade.
Leave one rifle division and one rifle brigade to protect the Leningrad Front's left flank.

This plan was approved early the following morning, but with changes to apply pressure across a broader front. Specifically, 1st Shock was to "continue to attack along its present axis toward Shanino and Krasnogorodskoe while cooperating with the Leningrad Front's left wing."

A total of six armies under Leningrad and 2nd Baltic Fronts grappled, with few breaks, from early March until April 18 to break through the deep defenses manned by 16th and 18th Armies, but the few gains were at the cost of heavy casualties. There were many regroupings among the attacking forces, such as the 182nd's move to 90th Rifle Corps from April 7-20 before being reassigned to 12th Guards Rifle Corps, all while remaining in 1st Shock Army. Meanwhile, Colonel Shatilov had left the division on April 6. He would soon take command of the 150th Rifle Division, was promoted to the rank of major general on November 2, and became a Hero of the Soviet Union on May 29, 1945, after leading his division into the heart of Berlin. He would reach the rank of colonel general in 1963, before his retirement the following year. Col. Alfred Yurievich Kalnin took over command of the 182nd, but he, in turn, would be replaced on June 6 by Col. Mikhail Vladimirovich Fyodorov, who had previously led the 137th Rifle Brigade. This officer, apart from a few days in April 1945, would lead the division into the postwar.

== Baltic Offensive ==
As of the beginning of July the 182nd was under direct command of 1st Shock, but shortly after that Army was moved to 3rd Baltic Front the division returned to 90th Corps, which was now part of 22nd Army, still in 2nd Baltic Front. At the start of the summer offensive into the Baltic states in early July the 182nd was facing the Panther Line due south of Pskov. Once that city was liberated on July 23 the Line was broken and 22nd Army began to exploit to the west. By the beginning of August the division was near the town of Preiļi in Latvia. From August 11-20 it came under command of 3rd Shock Army, but returned to 90th Corps in 22nd Army by the start of September. As the advance continued, by the second week of the month it reached as far as Viesīte. Later in the month it was reassigned, with 90th Corps, to 43rd Army in 1st Baltic Front. By early October this Army was moving southwest and the 182nd was in the vicinity of Radviliškis in Lithuania.

=== Advance on Memel ===
43rd Army was under command of Lt. Gen. A. P. Beloborodov. The addition of 90th Corps brought it up to a strength of 12 rifle divisions in four corps. It late September it had been advancing on Riga where German forces were concentrating in an attempt to hold the city. Soviet intelligence had discovered that there were only four divisions available to defend on the axis from Šiauliai to Memel, and Beloborodov was ordered to make this 100-120km march in order to attack the latter place in mid-October. The advance was to begin on October 5, with six divisions in the first echelon. The objective, beyond Memel itself, was to reach the Baltic coast and take the city of Tilsit, which would sever communications from East Prussia to the German forces still holding out in Latvia and Lithuania.

90th Corps' task was to hold the Army's left flank, a 35km-wide sector. The attack, following a reconnaissance-in-force and a relatively brief artillery preparation, achieved immediate success, with some German troops fleeing in panic. By the end of the day the Army's shock group had advanced 14-15km. The next day a further 25km was gained, and on October 7, as it joined the advance, the 90th Corps covered 10km while the 1st and 19th Rifle Corps in the center pushed ahead up to 40km. In the first six days of attack and pursuit a total of 130km had been covered. The Minija River was crossed by troops of the Front, including 43rd Army, on October 9. This river line was heavily fortified with trenches, pillboxes, and minefields, and the depleted German forces, backed by the garrison of Memel, were finally able to put up notable resistance. Altogether there were 18 infantry battalions of various strengths, plus about 40 tanks and assault guns, under command of the headquarters of XXXX Panzer Corps. Memel itself was guarded by nine forts completed the previous March, each armed with a 310mm naval gun, plus the usual machine guns and lighter artillery. On October 10, Beloborodov's Army advanced another 8-18km while fighting off more than 10 counterattacks and closed up to the outer perimeter of the Memel fortifications, but it was impossible to take these from off the march. The following day, despite heavy fire from the forts, the 90th and 92nd Rifle Corps managed to advance on the flanks, while the 19th Corps attempted to reach the Baltic coast north and south of the city. At 1400 hours the 32nd Rifle Division cut the Memel–Tilsit road and was on the shoreline beyond.

While the offensive had been a significant success, finally isolating the elements of 16th and 18th Armies in the Courland Peninsula as well as the Memel garrison, it was soon clear that the latter place, with its forts, could not be taken until significant heavy artillery was brought up. On October 13 the 1st Baltic Front went over to the defense. 90th Corps was deployed along the Neman River, which formed the northern border of East Prussia.

== East Prussian Offensive ==
The STAVKA issued orders on December 6 to Army Gen. I. K. Bagramyan, commander of 1st Baltic Front, that he was to concentrate 4-5 rifle divisions on the left flank of 43rd Army by December 28 in order to assist 3rd Belorussian Front in defeating the German group of forces in and around Tilsit and then to roll up the defense along the Neman at the outset of the upcoming offensive into East Prussia. 90th Corps was to provide the larger part of this force. In the first days the Corps forced a crossing of the Neman and then advanced along the south bank, breaking into Tilsit during the latter half of January 19 and capturing it after a short battle. On February 19 the 140th and 171st Rifle Regiments would both be awarded the Order of the Red Banner for their roles in the taking of Tilsit as well as several nearby towns in East Prussia. Immediately after this the 43rd Army as a whole was transferred to 3rd Belorussian Front.

This Front now began a pursuit of the defeated German IX Army Corps with its right wing Armies; the German remnants were attempting to retreat behind the Alle and Deime Rivers. By the end of January 22 the 43rd Army had made a fighting advance of 23km and the 90th Corps' main force had reached the eastern shore of the Kurisches Haff as far as the Nemonin River while other elements of the Army had reached from the Nemonin to Agilla and to Kelladen. The German forces were hurriedly fortifying the approaches to Labiau and were trying to organize a defense along the east bank of the Deime, which was the last line of defense before Königsberg.

Combat operations continued overnight on January 22/23. At dawn the 43rd Army attacked Labiau following a short artillery preparation. The defenders, employing heavy machine gun and mortar fire, initially stopped the 103rd Rifle Corps' units at the river, but eventually its 115th Rifle Division and 54th Corps' 263rd Rifle Division forced a crossing and outflanked the town from north and south, while the 319th Rifle Division broke in from the east. Labiau, with most of its garrison, was in Soviet hands by the end of the day and the Army was directed to continue its advance to the west. By the end of January 26 it had reached a line from Postnikken to Zelweten. From here it developed its attack along the seacoast, pursuing the remnants of two German infantry divisions and reaching the line Stombeck–Norgenen. With Königsberg cut off the Front now focused on eliminating the German forces southwest of the city in the Preußisch Eylau–Landsberg–Bartenstein area, but this did not directly involve the 43rd Army, which was transferred to 1st Baltic Front on February 9. On February 19 the 182nd was transferred to 13th Guards Rifle Corps, still in 43rd Army. On February 21, the STAVKA redesignated this Front as the Zemland Group of Forces, effective February 24.

=== Samland Offensive ===
By the beginning of April, just prior to the final assault on Königsberg, the 182nd had been transferred to 103rd Corps, which was now part of 2nd Guards Army, also in the Zemland Group. As the Group's right wing army the 2nd Guards was not directly involved in this attack, but instead was directed to clear the remaining German positions in the Samland Peninsula, particularly the port of Pillau. This objective was heavily bombed on April 8, but the 2nd Guards made little progress until it was joined on April 13 by additional forces freed up after the fall of Königsberg. It was assigned an attack sector 20km wide on the north flank, and was to attack in the direction of Gross Hubniken, with a supporting attack toward Germau. On the first day the Army broke the defense in two places, advanced 2.5km, and took 1,017 prisoners. The next day the remaining German forces began to retreat to the west and 2nd Guards gained another 15km, while capturing another 2,500 men and a large amount of equipment. On April 15 the Army reached the Baltic, having cleared the northwestern sector of the peninsula. What remained of the German forces pulled into the heavily-fortified Pillau area, which was not taken until April 25. During this fighting, Colonel Fyodorov handed his command to Col. Aleksandr Aleksandrovich Shchennikov on April 17, but returned on April 23.

== Postwar ==
The 182nd ended the war in 103rd Corps of 43rd Army, which was now in 2nd Belorussian Front. On May 28 the 232nd Rifle Regiment was awarded the Order of Kutuzov, 3rd Degree, and the 14th Antitank Battalion was given the Order of Alexander Nevsky, both for their roles in the battle for Pillau. The next day the STAVKA issued Order No. 11097. Under part 8, the 182nd is listed as one of the rifle divisions to be "disbanded in place". The division was disbanded in July.
