= Artur Lossmann =

Estonian military officer (1877–1972)

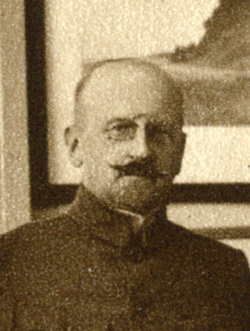
- Lossmann in 1920.
- Born: 5 October 1877; Vana-Vändra Parish, Pärnu County
- Died: 1 August 1972 (aged 94); London
- Military career
- Allegiance: Russian Empire; Estonia
- Commands: 1st Military Hospital
- Awards: Cross of Liberty, 1st Class 2nd Rank; Order of the Cross of the Eagle, 1st Class; Order of the Estonian Red Cross

Artur Lossmann (also Arthur Lossmann; 5 October 1877 – 1 August 1972) was an Estonian Major-General and doctor of medicine. He served as Chief Physician of the 1st Military Hospital in Tallinn during the Estonian War of Independence.

In 1904, he graduated from S. M. Kirov Military Medical Academy. From 1907 until 1914, he worked as a military physician in St. Petersburg. He participated on Russo-Japanese War, and in World War I as a soldier of the Russian Empire. Lossmann returned to Estonia and from 1918 until 1920, (during Estonian War of Independence) he was the chief physician of Tallinn 1st Military Hospital. From 1920 until 1935, he was the chief of the Healthcare Administration of the Military (Estonian: sõjaväe tervishoiuvalitsus). In 1935, he retired. In 1944, following the Soviet occupation of Estonia, he fled to Germany, and in 1947, he emigrated to the United Kingdom, where he died in 1972.

In 1998, Lossmann's body was reinterred at the Defence Forces Cemetery of Tallinn, at the initiative of his daughter Nora Vanda Morley-Fletcher.
