= Teodors Spāde =

Teodors Spāde (7 March 1891 – 25 July 1970) was a Latvian naval officer. A World War I and Russian Civil War veteran, he held commanding positions in the Latvian navy from 1931 to 1940. After the Soviet occupation of Latvia, Spāde was deported from the country. He died in exile in the Kazakh SSR and was reburied to his homeland in 1990.

== Early career ==
Spāde was born into a fisherman's family in Ventspils, then part of the Russian Empire, in 1891. He was trained as a mechanical engineer at the Riga Polytechnic Institute, which he graduated in 1914. He was drafted in the Imperial Russian Baltic Fleet at the outset of World War I. He advanced from a position of michman to that of a torpedo boat commander and ended up as a commanding officer at the Black Sea Navy Brigade Headquarters in Batumi, where he married a Georgian woman in 1917. After the fall of the Russian Empire, he joined the navy of the People's Republic of Ukraine in early 1918 and, following a peace treaty between Ukraine and the Central Powers, pledged his loyalty to the Democratic Republic of Georgia. In Georgian service Spāde commanded a detachment of cutters in Batumi. In June 1918, the Ottoman troops took control of Batumi and made the town's garrison, including Spāde, captive. Released in October 1918, Spāde joined the ranks of the Armed Forces of South Russia, a White party to the Russian Civil War. He was promoted to Senior Lieutenant and put in charge of the Sevastopol port. In March 1920, Spāde, together with the defeated White forces, was evacuated to Constantinople, where he accepted Latvian citizenship and returned to Latvia with his wife.

== Latvia and exile ==
Spāde joined the Latvian military in 1926 and received training at the French Naval Academy in 1928. In 1931, as a Captain 2nd Rank, he was placed in command of the Latvian Coast Guard squadron. He was promoted to Captain 1st Rank in 1933 and admiral in 1938. That same year, he was appointed the chief of the Latvian navy. After the Soviet occupation in 1940, Spāde was released of his command and in less than a year he was deported to Siberia. Having spent several years in labour camps, Spāde was freed in 1954, but was still prohibited from returning in Latvia. The former admiral worked as an accountant at a hospital in Temirtau in Kazakhstan, where he died in 1970. His remains were reburied to Latvia in 1990.
