= Juhan Tõrvand =

Estonian military personnel

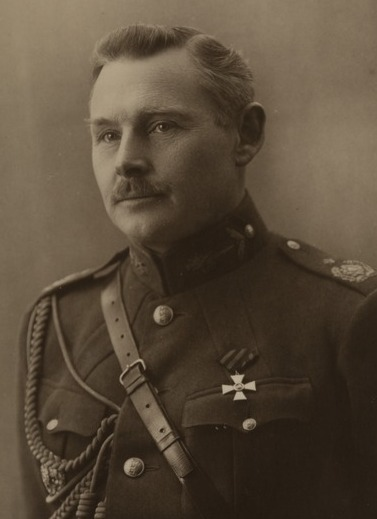
Juhan Tõrvand

Juhan Tõrvand (25 November 1883 Laatre Parish (now Mulgi Parish), Kreis Wolmar – 12 May 1942 Verkhnekamsky District, Kirov Oblast, Russian SFSR) was an Estonian military Major General and sportsman.

In 1906, he graduated from Vilnius Military School, from which he proceeded to the General Staff Academy. He participated in World War I and the Russian Civil War in the White Army. In 1920 he returned to Estonia. In 1925, he became Chief of Staff of the Headquarters of the Estonian Defence Forces.

He was also active in Estonian sporting life. From 1927 until 1935, he was the head of the Estonian Sports Association Kalev.

== Death ==
Following the Soviet occupation of Estonia, Tõrvand and his family were arrested during the June deportations on 14 June 1941. Tõrvand was convicted by a tribunal and placed within the gulag camp system. He died of pneumonia on 12 May 1942 in Vyatlag camp in Kirov Oblast.

== Awards ==
- 1933: Order of the Cross of the Eagle, Class I.
