= Rudolf Reimann =

Estonian military personnel

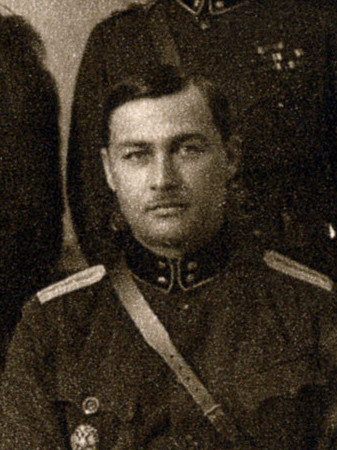
Rudolf Reimann in 1920

Rudolf Johannes Reimann (18 January 1884 Tartu – 16 September 1946 Tallinn) was an Estonian military Major General. He is considered to be the founder of Estonia's military logistics.

In 1907 he graduated from Vilnius Military School, and in 1914 from the military academy in St. Petersburg. He participated in World War I. In 1917 he joined with Estonian national regiments. He participated in the Estonian War of Independence. During the war he was Chief of Army Supplies. From 1920 to 1923 he was retired, but in 1923 he was recalled. From 1923 to 1929 he was again Chief of Army Supplies. From 1934 to 1940 he was the standing member of the Ministry of War Council.

Awards:

- 1920: Cross of Liberty, I class I rank
