= Richard Tomberg =

Estonian military officer (1897–1982)

- Born: September 6, 1897; Mõisamaa, Salla Parish, Russian Empire
- Died: May 25, 1982 (aged 84) Tallinn, then part of Estonian SSR, Soviet Union
- Allegiance: Russian Empire; Estonia; Soviet Union
- Branch: Imperial Russian Army; Estonian Air Force; Soviet Army
- Service years: 1915–1944
- Rank: Major General
- Commands: Chief of Staff, Estonian Air Force (1928–1930); Commander, Estonian Air Force (1930–1940)
- Conflicts: World War I; Estonian War of Independence
- Awards: Order of the Cross of the Eagle, II Class (1938)

Richard Tomberg (6 September 1897 – 25 May 1982) was an Estonian military Major General. He was the only Estonian higher military personnel who survived Soviet times in the 1940s.

== Early life and education ==
Tomberg was born on 6 September 1897 in Mõisamaa, Salla Parish.

In 1915, he entered voluntarily into the Tsarist Army. In 1916, he graduated from Vilnius Military School.

== Military career ==
He served in the Imperial Russian Army during World War I. In 1917, he joined the Estonian national regiments. He participated in the Estonian War of Independence. 1928–1930, he was the chief of staff of the Estonian Air Force. 1930–1940, he was the chief of the Estonian Air Force.

In 1940, he transferred to the Soviet Army. In 1944, he was arrested by the NKVD, but in 1956 he was released and rehabilitated and retired.

== Death ==
He died on 25 May 1982 in Tallinn.

== Awards ==
- 1938: Order of the Cross of the Eagle, II Class.
