= Viktor Puskar =

Estonian military commander

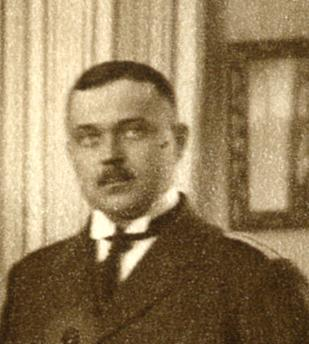
- Viktor Puskar in 1920
- Born: May 7 [O.S. April 25] 1889; Viljandi, Governorate of Estonia, Russian Empire
- Died: April 12, 1943; Tartu, Estonia
- Education: Vilnius Military School
- Military career
- Rank: Colonel
- Conflicts: World War I Estonian War of Independence

Viktor Puskar VR I/1 (7 May [O.S. 25 April] 1889 in Viljandi – 12 April 1943 in Tartu) was an Estonian military commander (Colonel) during the Estonian War of Independence.

In 1911 he graduated from Vilnius Military Academy. Puskar participated in World War I, joining the Estonian national units in 1917. At the beginning of the Estonian War of Independence in 1918, Puskar was leader of the Järvamaa Defence League. In December he became commander of the 2nd Division. During the war he successfully defended South Estonia, expelled the Red Army from North Latvia and captured Pskov.

Puskar retired in 1920 and became a farmer. He was one of the leaders of the Vaps Movement and was in jail from 1936 to 1937, accused of underground activity.

Puskar went to Germany in 1941, returning to Estonia after the Red Army had been driven out. He died in Tartu in 1943.

== See also ==
- Estonian War of Independence
