= Dmitri Lebedev (general) =

Estonian-Russian military personnel (1872–1935)

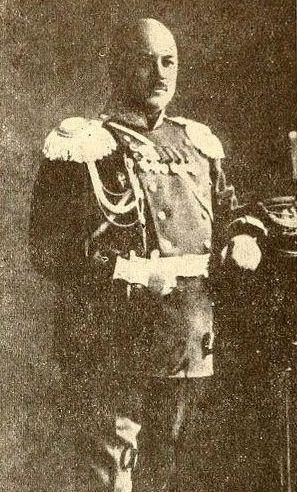
Dmitri Lebedev

Dmitri Lebedev (in Estonian sources Dimitri Lebedev; 28 July 1872 Pärnu County – 8 January 1935 Tallinn) was a Russian military personnel (since 1917 Major-General).

In 1895 he was graduated from Vilnius Military School, and in 1904 General Staff Academy. He participated in the Russo-Japanese War. He participated also in World War I.

In 1921 he moved to Estonia. He was a lector at Estonian Military Academy. In 1927 he retired.
