= Valeri Saar =

Estonian military personnel

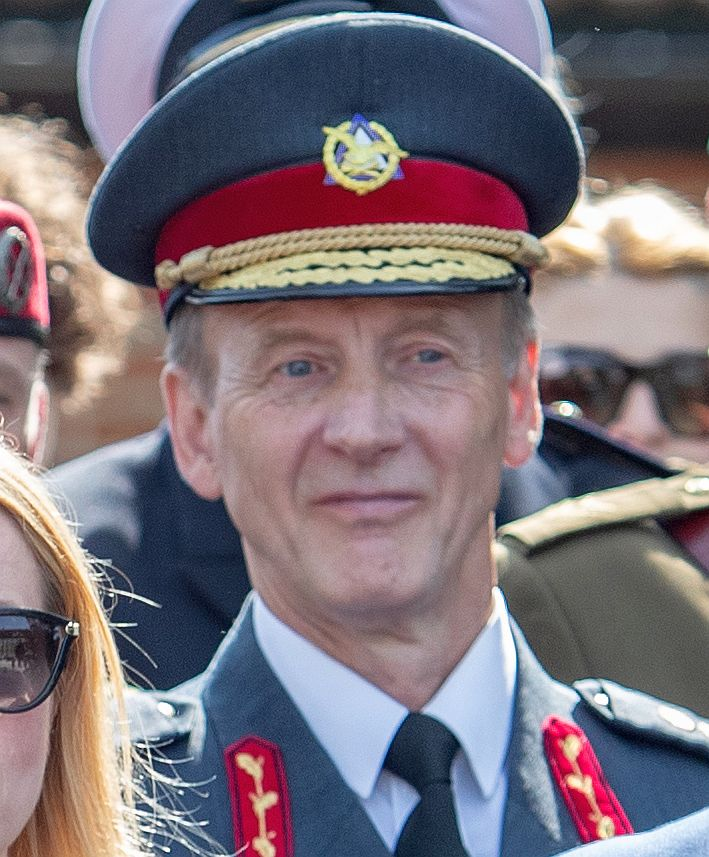
Valeri Saar in 2023

Valeri Saar (born 28 June 1955 in Valga) is an Estonian military personnel (Major General).

In 1976, he graduated from the Higher Air Defense Radio Electronic Military College in Zhitomir, Ukraine.

He started his military career in 1976, being an engineer and the Chief of Radar Station in the Air Defense unit. Between the years of 2007 to 2012, he was the Commander of Estonian Air Force. Since 2012, he has been the Military Representative of Estonia to NATO and EU Military Committees.

In 2005, he was awarded with Order of the Cross of the Eagle, III class.
