= Nikolai Helk =

Estonian general

Nikolai Helk (25 February 1886 in Laiuse Kirikuküla, Jõgeva Parish, Kreis Dorpat – 14 May 1941 in Tallinn) was an Estonian Major General Judge Advocate and President of the Supreme Military Tribunal between 1935 and 1940. He was executed by the Soviet occupation forces on 14 May 1941.
