= Martin Jervan =

Estonian military personnel and military doctor

Martin Volmer Jervan
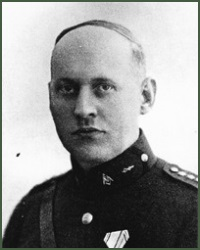
- Born: May 13, 1891; Reval, Governorate of Estonia, Russian Empire
- Died: October 15, 1942 (aged 51) Chelyabinsk Prison Camp, Chelyabinsk, Soviet Union
- Allegiance: Estonian Defence Forces; Red Army

Martin Volmer Jervan (May 13, 1891 Tallinn – October 15, 1942, Chelyabinsk) was an Estonian major general and medical doctor. He served as head of the Estonian Army medical service from 1935 until the Soviet occupation in 1940. After Estonia was incorporated into the Soviet Union on August 6, 1940, as the Estonian SSR and the Estonian Army was reorganized as the 22nd Estonian Territorial Rifle Corps of the Red Army, Jervan served as the chief of the medical service of the 22nd Rifle Corps.

On March 8, 1941, Jervan was arrested, deported, and subsequently executed in Chelyabinsk prison camp.
