= August Kasekamp =

Estonian military personnel

August Kasekamp (21 January 1889 – 3 October 1942) was an Estonian military personnel (Major-General).

August Kasekamp participated in the Estonian War of Independence as the commander of the Järva County Defence League, later as the commander of the 7th company of the 9th Infantry Regiment. From 1930 until 1933, he was the commander of Estonian Military Academy. From 1933 until 1934 he was the commanding officer of 7th Regiment. From 1934 until 1936 and from 1939 until 1940, he was deputy chief of General Staff. In 1940, he was transferred to Soviet Army. In 1941 he was arrested by the NKVD and died in the Gulag camp system in Saratov Oblast in the Russian Soviet Federative Socialist Republic.

Kasekamp's son Päivo Kasekamp was the pastor of the Tartu Methodist Congregation, and his grandson Andres Kasekamp is a professor of Baltic politics at the Chair of International Relations at the University of Tartu.

== Awards ==
- 1935: Order of the Cross of the Eagle, III class.
