= Hermann Salza =

Baltic German and Estonian military personnel

Hermann von Salza
- Born: April 16, 1885; Haapsalu, Russian Empire
- Died: January 23, 1946 (aged 60); Moscow, USSR
- Military career
- Allegiance: Russian Empire; Estonia
- Branch: Estonian Navy
- Service years: 1907–1932
- Rank: Rear admiral
- Conflicts: World War I; Estonian War of Independence
- Awards: Order of the Cross of the Eagle (II class)

Herman(n) Alexander von Salza (16 April 1885 Haapsalu, – 23 January 1946 Moscow) was an Estonian rear admiral of Baltic-German descent.

In 1907, he graduated from a military marine school in St. Petersburg. He participated in WW I. In 1917, he was appointed to the commander of Russian battleship Petropavlovsk. In 1918, he moved to Estonia and joined the Estonian Defence Forces, becoming the chief of the Estonian Navy 1925–1932.

In 1934, he was awarded the Order of the Cross of the Eagle, II class.

In 1939, Salza left Estonia for Germany. In Germany, he was also given the rank of Rear Admiral, but did not enter the Kriegsmarine for actual military service. When World War II came to an end, Hermann Salza remained in the occupied territory of the Red Army because he did not want to leave his sick mother. He was arrested in April 1945 and taken to the USSR, where he died in the Butyrka prison in 1946.
