= Jaan Kruus =

Estonian military personnel

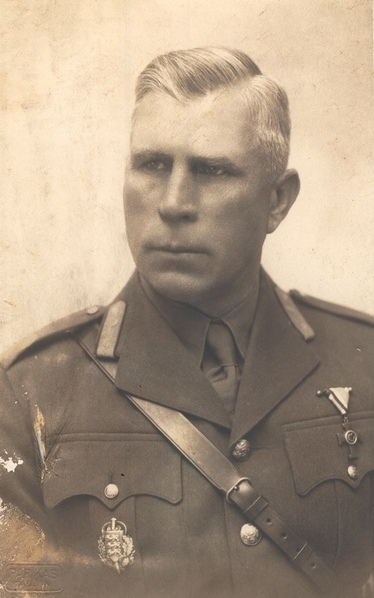
Kruus in 1920

Jaan Kruus (26 February 1884 – 15 May 1942) was an Estonian general.

Jaan Kruus was born in Sooniste Parish, Wiek County (now Märjamaa Parish, Rapla County). He fought in the Estonian War of Independence and afterwards pursued a military career. He was promoted to major-general in 1936. In 1940, during the Soviet occupation of Estonia, he was transferred to the Red Army and was a commander in the 182nd Rifle Division, part of the 27th Army. However, he was later arrested and executed in Moscow in 1942.
