= Johannes Orasmaa =

Estonian general and politician

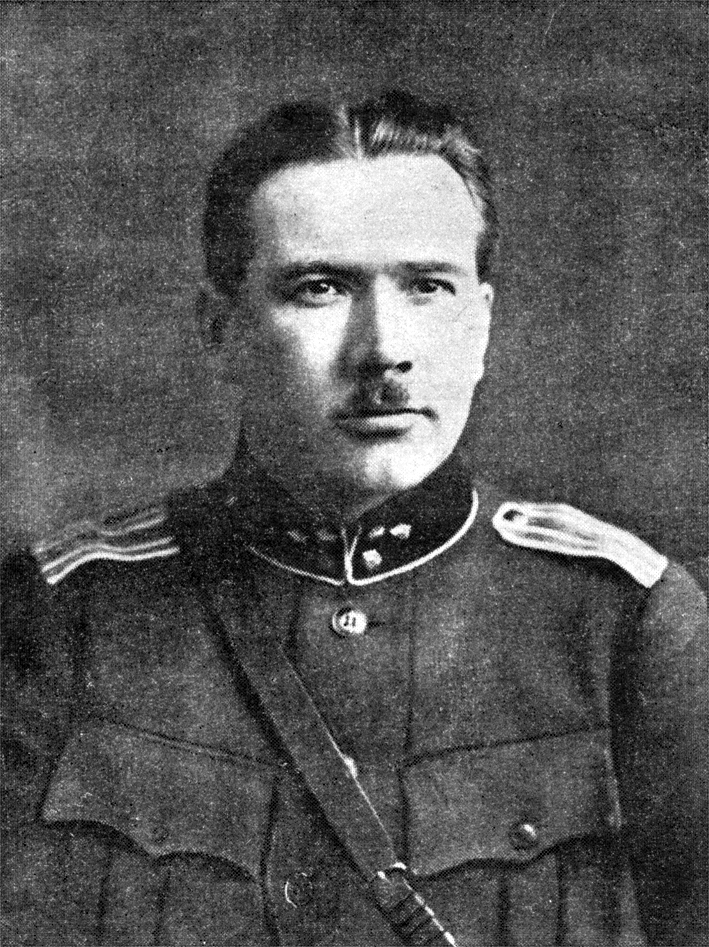
Johannes Orasmaa

Johannes Orasmaa, until 1935 Johannes Roska (3 December 1890 – 24 May 1943) was an Estonian general.

Johannes Orasmaa was born in the village of Joala, which then was part of the Governorate of Estonia but which now is included within the city limits of Narva. He fought in World War I as an officer of the Imperial Russian Army, then in the Estonian War of Independence, and then pursued a military career. He was promoted to the rank of major general in 1928 and was commander of the Estonian Defence League between 1925 and 1940. He was awarded the Estonian Cross of Liberty and also the Order of the White Rose of Finland and the Polish Gold Cross of Merit. During the Soviet occupation of Estonia, he was arrested and sent to a labour camp by the Soviet authorities, where he died in 1943.
