= Harry Hein =

Estonian military Major General (born 1945)

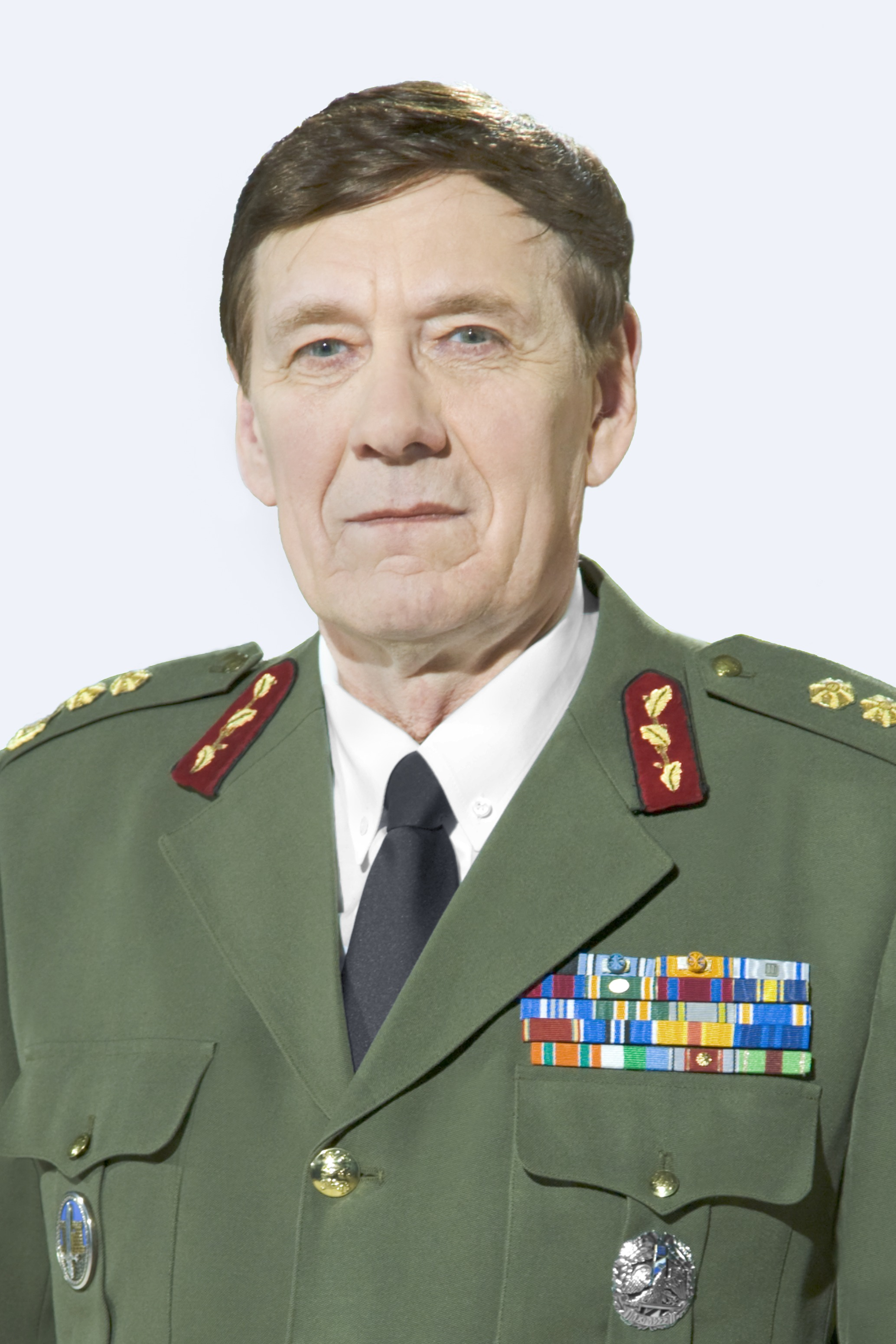
Harry Hein

Harry Hein (born 1945 in Valga) is an Estonian military Major General. From 1991 he has been the chief director of Estonian Rescue Board. In 2000s he was the Director General of Estonian Border Guard.
