= Aleksander Pulk =

Estonian military personnel

Aleksander-Voldemar Pulk (29 September 1886 – 20 August 1941) was an Estonian military personnel (Major-General).

1919-1934 he was the commanding officer of 1st Infantry Regiment. 1934-1936 he was the commanding officer of Pärnu-Viljandi Military District. 1936-1940 he was the commander of 1st Division.

Awards:

- 1938: Order of the Cross of the Eagle, II class.
