= Urmas Roosimägi =

Estonian military commander

Urmas Roosimägi (born in 1958) is a member of the Estonian military.

Roosimägi was born in Tallinn. He has studied at the Higher Anti-Aircraft College of Kiev, and at Finnish National Defence University.

Since 1995, he was the Commander of the Anti-Aircraft Division. In 1999, he was appointed as the Acting Commander of the Estonian Defence Forces.

In 2001, he was awarded the Order of the Cross of the Eagle, IV Class.
