= Otto Heinze =

Estonian military commander (1877–1968)

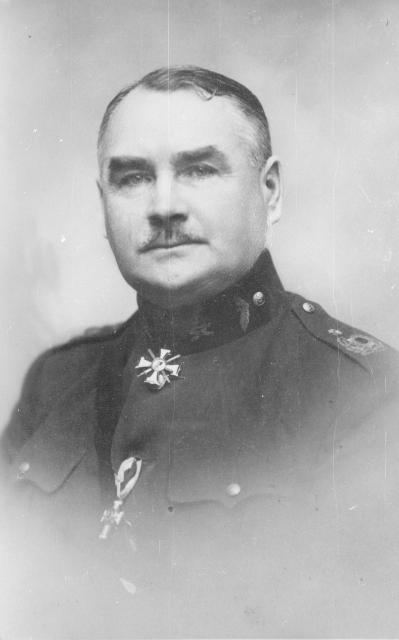
Otto Heinze

Otto Heinze VR I/2, VR II/3 (March 11, 1877 in Kotly, Saint Petersburg Governorate – June 8, 1968 in Bad Windsheim, West Germany) was an Estonian military commander during the Estonian War of Independence.

Heinze joined the Russian army voluntarily in 1905 after graduating from the Oranienbaum Military School. In World War I Heinze fought on the Russian side on the eastern front in East Prussia, the Carpathians and Lithuania, and on the South-West Front.

In the Estonian War of Independence, Heinze became commander of the 1st Infantry Regiment. In 1919 he became aide to the commander of the 1st Division and later was commander of the division himself. In 1920 he achieved the rank of Major General.

After the war Heinze worked in the Ministry of Defence and was twice commander of 1st Division. He retired in 1936. In 1941 he moved to Germany (his wife had German ancestry) to avoid Soviet repressions. He died in Bad Windsheim at the age of 91. Heinze is a recipient of the Latvian military Order of Lāčplēsis, 2nd class.

== See also ==
- Estonian War of Independence
