= Gustav Kunnos =

Estonian military personnel

Gustav Kunnos (11 July 1878 Kapera, Kreis Werro – 17 August 1926 Tallinn) was an Estonian military personnel (since 1926 Major-General).

1922–1926 he was the chairman of the Military Tribunal.

He died on 17 August 1926, because of cancer.
