= Aleksander Paldrok =

Estonian medical scientist

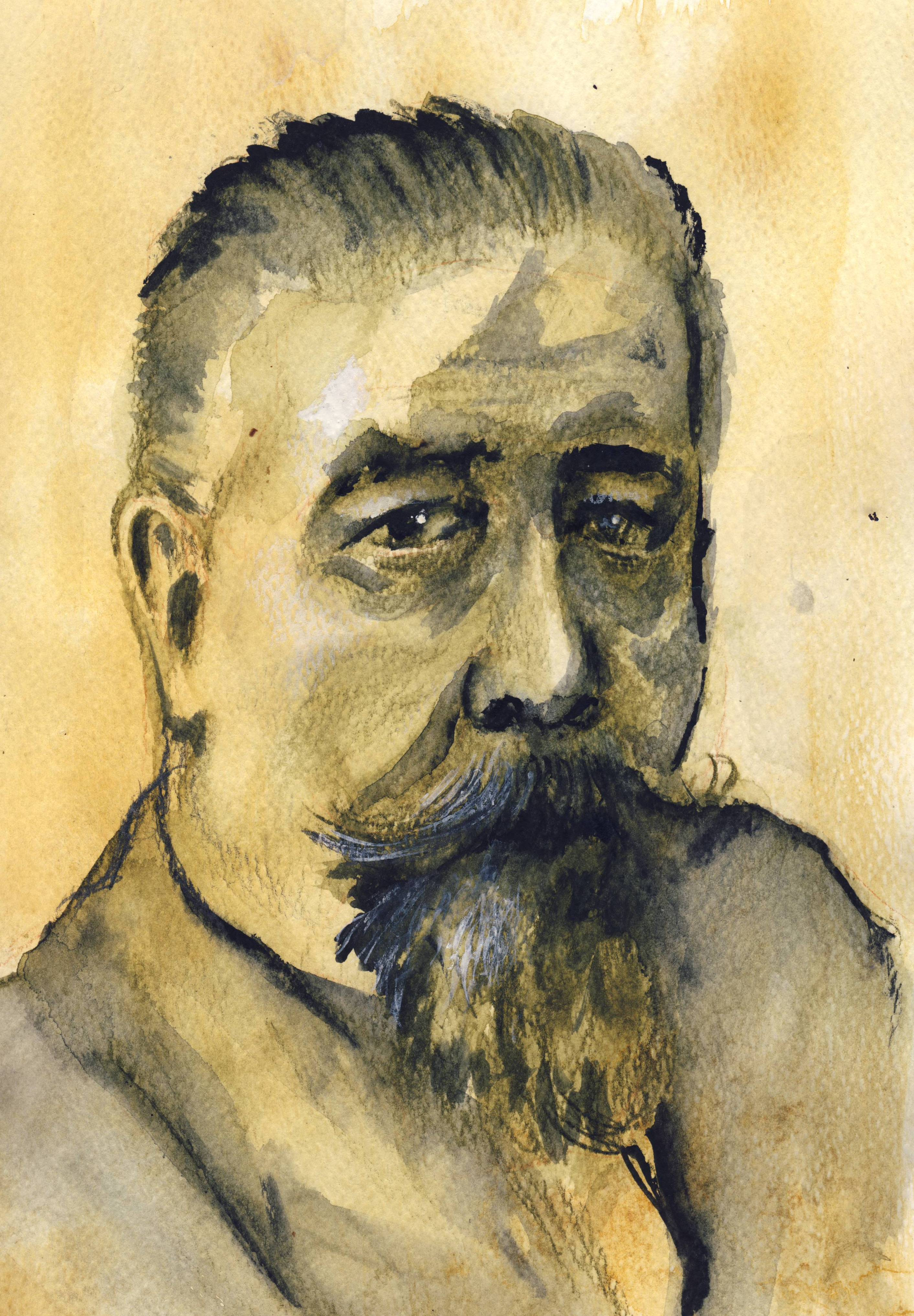
Aleksander Paldrok

Aleksander Paldrok (until 1936 Paldrock; 16 May 1871 – 1 July 1944 Kuressaare) was an Estonian medical scientist and military personnel (Major-General).

In 1896 he graduated from Tartu University in medicine.

On his initiative, on 7 September 1919 the department of dermatovenerology was opened at Tartu University.

He was specialized on skin and venereal diseases. Especially acclaimed was his publications about leprosy. In total he published over 100 scientific publications.

Awards:

- 1938: Order of the White Star, II class.
