= Otto Sternbeck =

Estonian military personnel and politician

Otto Sternbeck (24 December 1884 – 23 June 1941 Tallinn) was an Estonian military personnel and politician.

1933-1937 he was Minister of Communications.
