= Hugo Kauler =

Estonian general

Hugo Eduard Kauler
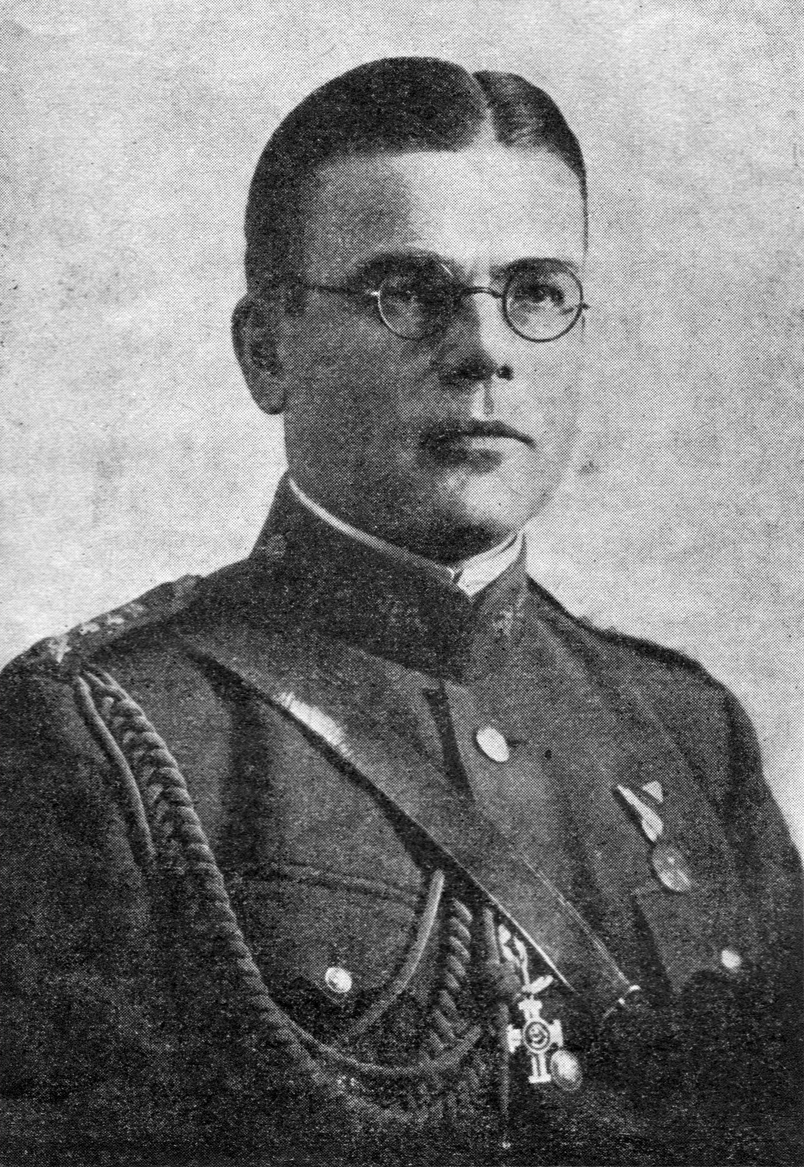
- Born: 2 October 1893; Väinjärve, Kreis Jerwen, Governorate of Estonia, Russian Empire
- Died: 22 September 1942 (aged 48) Norillag, Krasnoyarsk Krai, Russian SFSR, Soviet Union
- Cause of death: Execution
- Rank: General
- Awards: Cross of Liberty for Military Leadership 2nd class

Hugo Eduard Kauler (2 October 1893 – 22 September 1942) was an Estonian General.

Kauler was born in Väinjärve (now Järva Parish) in Kreis Jerwen, Governorate of Estonia. He became a lieutenant in the artillery during the Estonian War of Independence and was named commander of the 1st Artillery Battalion on 28 December 1918. Between 1924 and 1928 and again between 1930 and 1939 he was the inspector of the artillery. He was promoted to Major-General in 1939. Following the Soviet occupation of Estonia and the incorporation of Estonia into the Soviet Union of 6 August 1940 as the Estonian SSR, the Estonian Army was reorganized as the 22nd Estonian Territorial Rifle Corps, to which most of Estonian military personnel were transferred. Kauler became the commanding officer of the artillery of the 182nd Rifle Division of the 22nd Rifle Corps, part of the 27th Army. He was arrested by the NKVD on 28 June 1941, sent to a prison camp in Krasnoyarsk Krai and executed on 23 September 1942.

He was awarded the Cross of Liberty for Military Leadership (Second class) in 1921.
