= Vilnius Military School =

Coordinates: 54°40′57″N 25°15′36″E

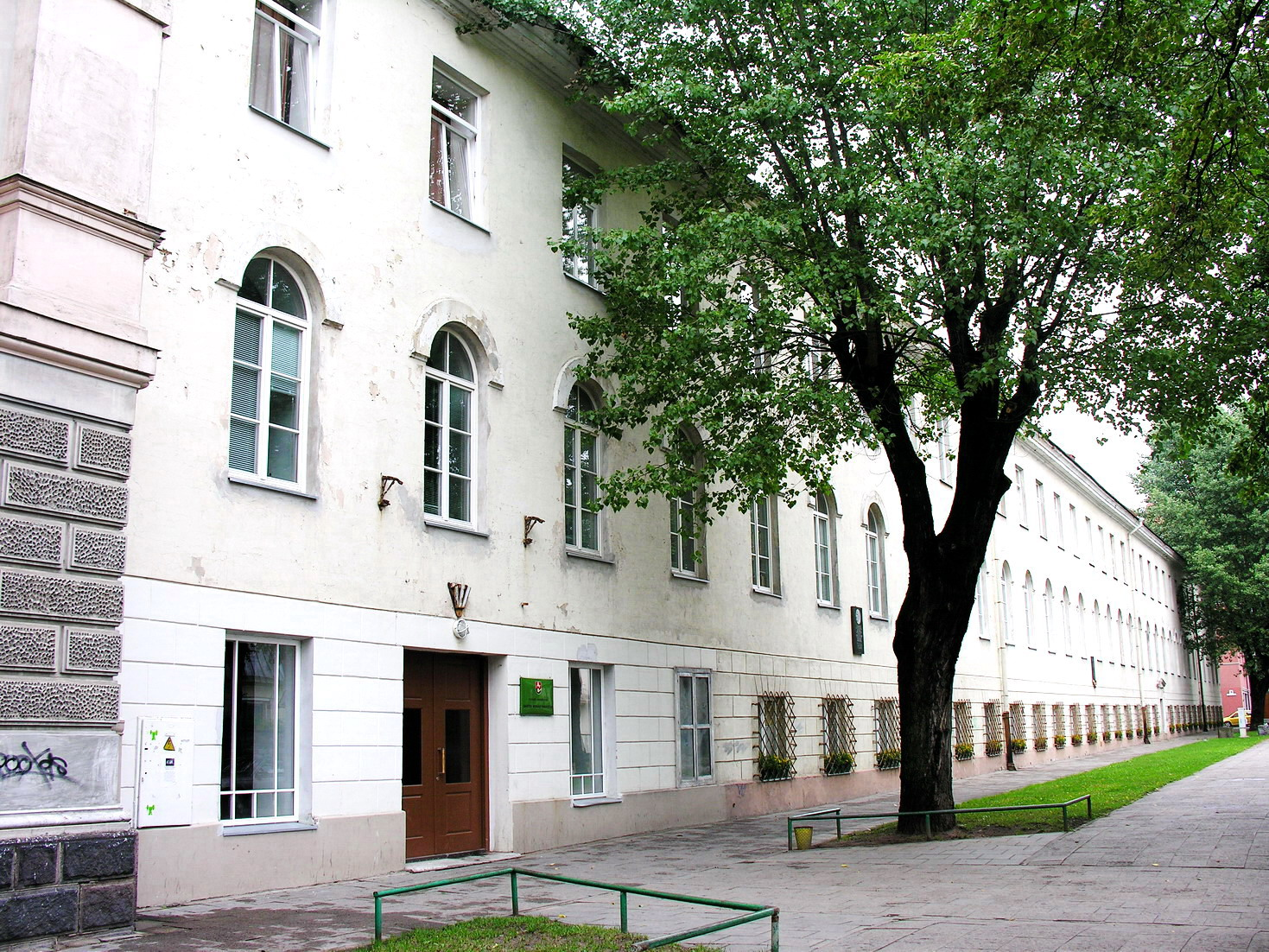
Former building of the military school (present-day Faculty of Chemistry and Geology of Vilnius University)

Vilnius Military School (Russian: Виленское военное училище), also known as the Vilnius Junker Infantry School, (Russian: Виленское пехотное юнкерское училище) was a military school for the non-commissioned officers (NCO) and junior officers of the Imperial Russian Army, operating from 1864 to 1915 in Vilnius. Up to 1910, the school prepared 4,371 podpraporshchiks and junior officers. During World War I, it relocated to Poltava and operated there in 1915–1918. In total, about 10,500 men graduated from the school, many becoming prominent military leaders and commanders in the post-war Eastern Europe.

== History ==
The poor preparation of the Russian army became evident during the Crimean War (1853–1856) and Count Dmitry Milyutin, Minister of War, introduced wide-ranging reforms to modernize the army. He established military districts and each district established a cadet school. Completion of a cadet school became mandatory for recruits and, from 1875, for drafted men if they wanted to be promoted to officers.

The Vilnius Junker Infantry School was officially established on 29 October 1864 by the command of the Vilnius Military District. The school took over premises of a military hospital. Initially, it was a two-year school that had about 200 junkers (cadets). From 1868, the school had a special section to train Cossack officers. About 35 cadets were organized into a special equestrian platoon. When the section was closed in 1885, the students were sent to cavalry schools in Yelisavetgrad and Novocherkassk.

In 1874, the number of cadets increased to 300. Since many applicants had poor knowledge of basic subjects, the school had a preparatory class from 1877 to 1885. In 1881, the school constructed barracks and an Eastern Orthodox church named after Saints Cosmas and Damian. During the Russo-Turkish War (1877–1878), the studies were accelerated. In 1901, it became a three-year school. In 1904, the school expanded to 400 students. At the same time, graduates would be promoted to junior officers rather than to podpraporshchiks. In 1912, the school published a booklet on its ten alumni that were awarded the Order of St. George.

At the outbreak of World War I, the school introduced a four-month accelerated training course and increased the number of students to 900 cadets. On 15 July 1915, the school was evacuated to Poltava. Officially, the school was liquidated on 2 January 1918.

== Badges ==
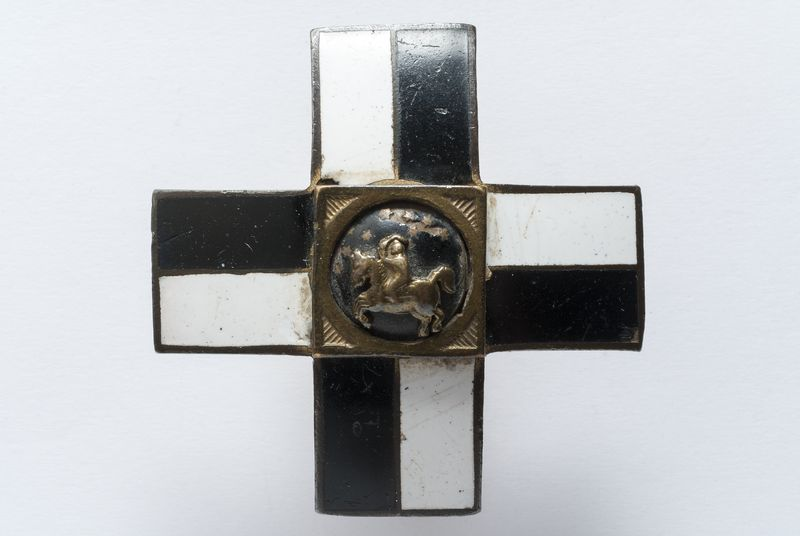
Graduation insignia, 1910

The school had two badges – one for cadets and the other for graduates.

The cadet badge was established in 1910. The averse depicted coat of arms of Russia (eagle) in a circle of rays on top of the larger silver coat of arms of Lithuania (armed knight) on red enamel. The knight was surrounded by a Russian slogan on blue enamel proclaiming that even if he is alone on the field, a Vilnius graduate is a warrior (Russian: Виленецъ одинъ въ поле и тотъ воинъ). The reverse depicted the same Russian eagle on top of rays shooting from a star down to the seven silver stars forming the Big Dipper on blue enamel. The slogan reads Know the true way to nobility and light (Russian: К высокому и светлому знай верный путь).

The graduate badge was established in 1915. Depending on available funds, it was either silver or bronze. It is a Greek cross 41 by 41 millimetres (1.6 in × 1.6 in) in size. The cross is covered in black and white enamel. The top arm depicts royal monograms of Tsars Alexander II and Nicholas II of Russia. The center depicted the Lithuanian knight under the rays shooting down to the Big Dipper (i.e. a combination of both averse and reserve of the cadet badge). After the February Revolution, the royal monograms were removed and the Big Dipper was replaced by two stars. Both of school mottoes were recorded in the edges of the badge.

== Notable alumni ==
In 53 years, the school educated 68 classes of about 10,500 officers. About 340 men were awarded the Order of St. George and about 230 were promoted to generals. After World War I, 21 alumni became Ministers of Defense or commanders of the national armies of the newly independent states of Lithuania, Latvia, Estonia, and Poland.

Prominent alumni include:

- Jonas Acus-Acukas (1885–1976)
- Jānis Balodis (1881–1965)
- Krišjānis Berķis (1884–1942)
- Roberts Dambītis (1881–1957)
- Oskars Dankers (1883–1965)
- Kārlis Goppers (1876–1941)
- Petras Kubiliūnas (1894–1946)
- Kazys Ladiga (1893–1941)
- Johan Laidoner (1884–1953)
- Andres Larka (1879–1943)
- Aleksandar Mišić (1891–1941)
- Ignacy Oziewicz (1887–1966)
- Voldemārs Ozols (1884–1949)
- Gustaw Paszkiewicz (1892–1955)
- Ernst Põdder (1879–1932)
- Viktor Puskar (1889–1943)
- Rudolf Reimann (1884–1946)
- Tõnis Rotberg (1882–1953)
- Volodymyr Salsky (1885–1940)
- Jaan Soots (1880–1942)
- Aleksander Tõnisson (1875–1941)
- Jorģis Zemitāns (1873–1928)
- Silvestras Žukauskas (1860–1937)
