= Meelis Kiili =

Estonian Major General (born 1965)

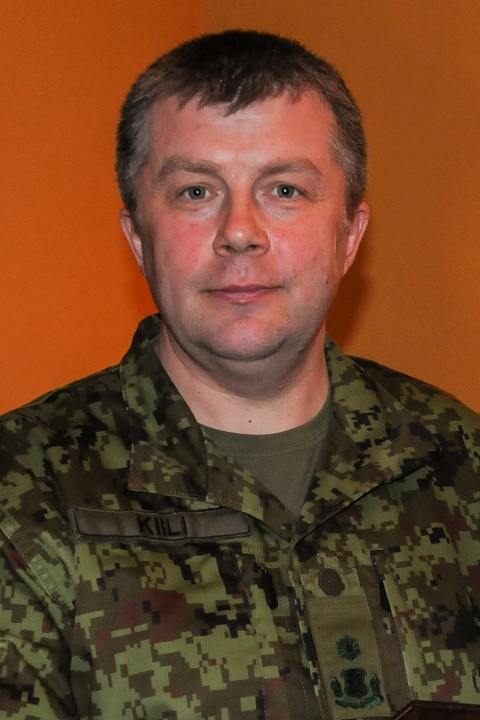
- Kiili in 2013
- Born: 20 March 1965 (age 61)
- Occupation: Commander of the Estonian Defence League

Meelis Kiili (born 20 March 1965) is an Estonian Major General. From December 2012 to July 2019, he was the commander of the Estonian Defence League.

== Military career ==
=== Estonian Defence Forces ===
Meelis Kiili joined the Estonia Defence Forces at its reconstruction in the 1990s. From 2005 to 2006 he was the Chief of Staff of the Army, and from 2006 to 2007 he was the deputy Chief of Staff of the Armed Forces. From 2008 to 2010 he was a military attaché in the United States and Canada. In 2009, he was promoted to Colonel, and in October 2010 he was promoted to Brigadier General.

=== Paramilitary organisations ===
Two months after his promotion to the rank of Brigadier General, Kiili was appointed to the commandant of the Baltic Defence College. After retiring from this position in December 2012, he became the Commander of the Estonian Defence League until July 2019.

== Personal life ==
Kiili is married with two daughters. Before his military career he studied at the Estonian University of Life Sciences, from 1984 to 1991.

In May 2015, Kiili was added to the Russian list of sanctioned individuals, blocking him from entering Russia.
