= Tõnis Rotberg =

Estonian general (1882–1953)

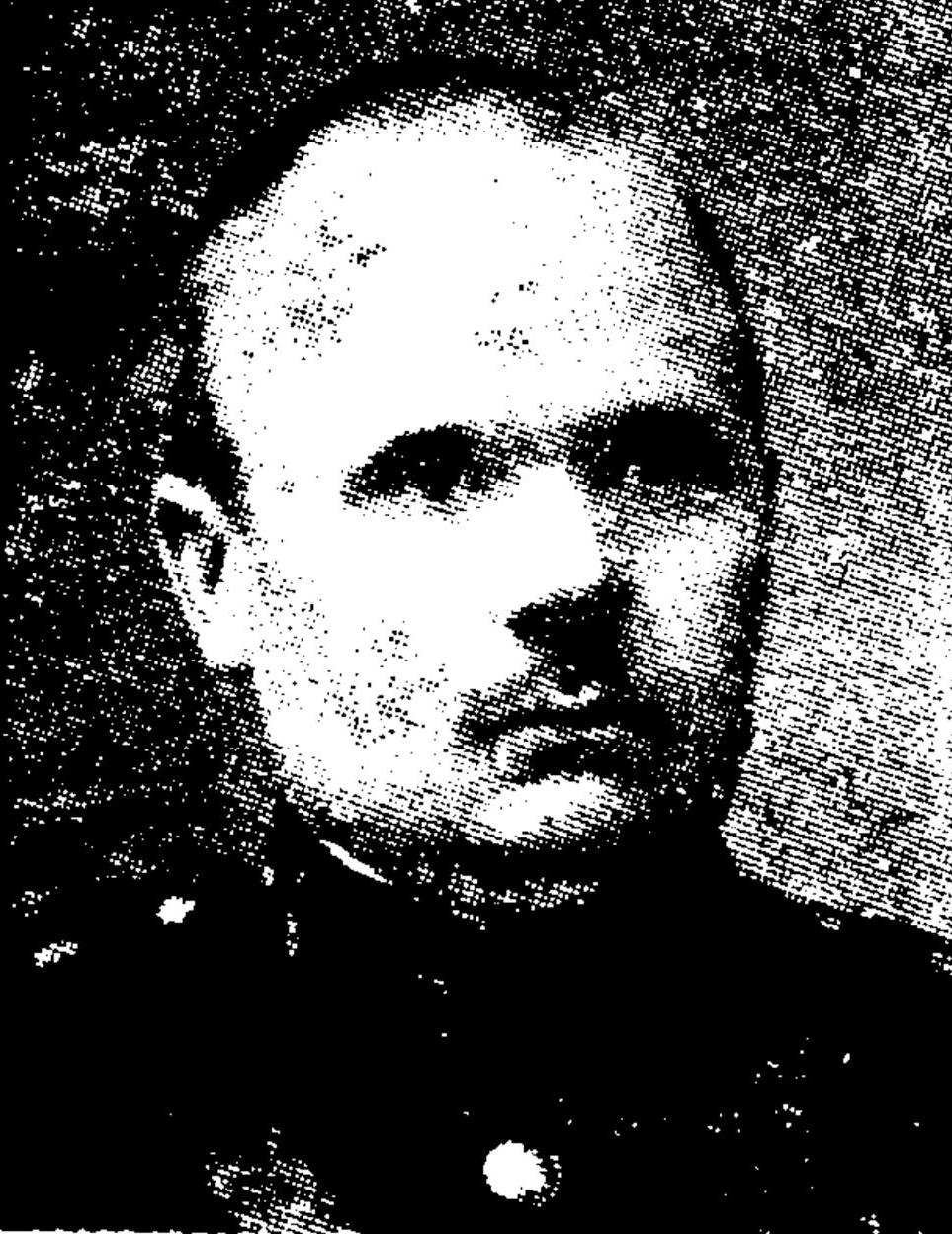
Tõnis Rotberg.

Tõnis Rotberg (9 September 1882 in Viljandi Parish, Kreis Fellin, Governorate of Livonia – 24 July 1953 in Tayshet, Russian SFSR) was an Estonian general.

== Biography ==
Rotberg was born in Viljandi and attended Vilnius military school to become an officer in the Imperial Russian Army, as Estonia at the time was part of the Russian Empire. He became a lieutenant in 1909. During the Estonian War of Independence, Rotberg became a lieutenant colonel in the Estonian Army and was the Head of Army Supplies between 1918 and 1938. In 1928, he was promoted to the rank of Major-General.

In 1938–1940, Rotberg was Deputy Minister of War. On 21 June 1940, he was appointed Minister of War in Johannes Vares' cabinet after the occupation of the Baltic states by the Soviet Union. He held this position until the cabinet was replaced by the Council of People's Commissars of the Estonian SSR on 25 August 1940.

Rotberg was then transferred to the Red Army and fought in the Great Patriotic War. He was taken prisoner by Wehrmacht forces near the town of Porkhov in July 1941, but released in July 1942 after promising not to take up arms against the Germans.

After the Soviet Union re-occupied the Baltic states in September 1944, Rotberg was arrested by the NKVD in Tallinn. He was accused of participating in hostilities against the Red Army in 1919, of surrender to the Wehrmacht without resistance in 1941, and of living in German-occupied Estonia without taking up arms against the occupiers after his release from captivity. On 19 October 1951, he was sentenced to 25 years in prison. Rotberg died on 24 July 1953 in prison in Tayshet. He was posthumously rehabilitated on 31 October 1957.

He was awarded the Cross of Liberty for Military Leadership (Second class) in 1921 and the Order of Polonia Restituta (Fourth class) in 1925.
