= Vello Loemaa =

Estonian military personnel (born 1951)

Major General Vello Loemaa (born 18 January 1951) was an Estonian military figure. He graduated in 1973 as a fighter pilot from the Yeysk Higher Military Aviation School of the Soviet Air Forces. In 1982, he graduated from Gagarin Air Force Academy in Monino.

In 1992, he began working in Estonian Defence Forces. From 1998–2002, he was Military Representative of Estonia to NATO. He has also been Defence Attaché of Estonia. In 2001, he was awarded with Order of the Cross of the Eagle, IV class.
