= Voldemārs Ozols =

Voldemārs Ozols (17 October 1884, Vidreja, Vitebsk Governorate – 12 July 1949) was a Latvian military commander, lieutenant colonel, honored with the Order of Lāčplēsis, one of the Latvian Riflemen, a military theorist, and a right wing politician.

On 15 December 1932, he founded a right-wing organization, The Society of the Cavaliers of the Order of Lāčplēsis and Freedom Fighters "Legion" (Lāčplēša kara ordeņa kavalieru un brīvības cīnītāju biedrība "Leģions"), known simply as the Legion. It was a rather small organization, primarily of World War I and Latvian War of Independence veterans.

In 1934, in the declaration of the martial law by Kārlis Ulmanis, the Legion was the only organization mentioned by name as a threat to the state. Ozols was arrested and accused of the preparation of a coup.
