= Roberts Dambītis =

Latvian politician

General Roberts Dambītis (May 2, 1881 – March 27, 1957 in Trikāta parish near Strenči, Latvia) was a Latvian military officer and politician.

A founder of the National Soldiers' Union as a Latvian Rifleman in World War I, Dambītis formally became the first soldier in the Latvian Army by placing volunteer units under the command of the People's Council of Latvia when it proclaimed Latvia's independence on November 18, 1918. He was subsequently appointed Deputy Minister of Defense during the Independence War. After the war he served in various high-ranking posts in military supply and administration, culminating in his appointment as Deputy Chief of the General Staff in 1935 and his retirement in 1939.

In 1940, during the first year of Soviet Rule of Latvia, Dambītis joined the puppet government as Minister of War and oversaw the conversion of the Latvian Army to a Red Army Corps. He remained in Latvia after the retreat of the Red Army in 1941, was arrested by the Gestapo and interned in the Sachsenhausen concentration camp until 1945. After the war he returned to Trikāta, where he spent the remainder of his life.

== See also ==
- List of Latvian Army generals
