= Aleksander Silberg =

Estonian-Russian military personnel

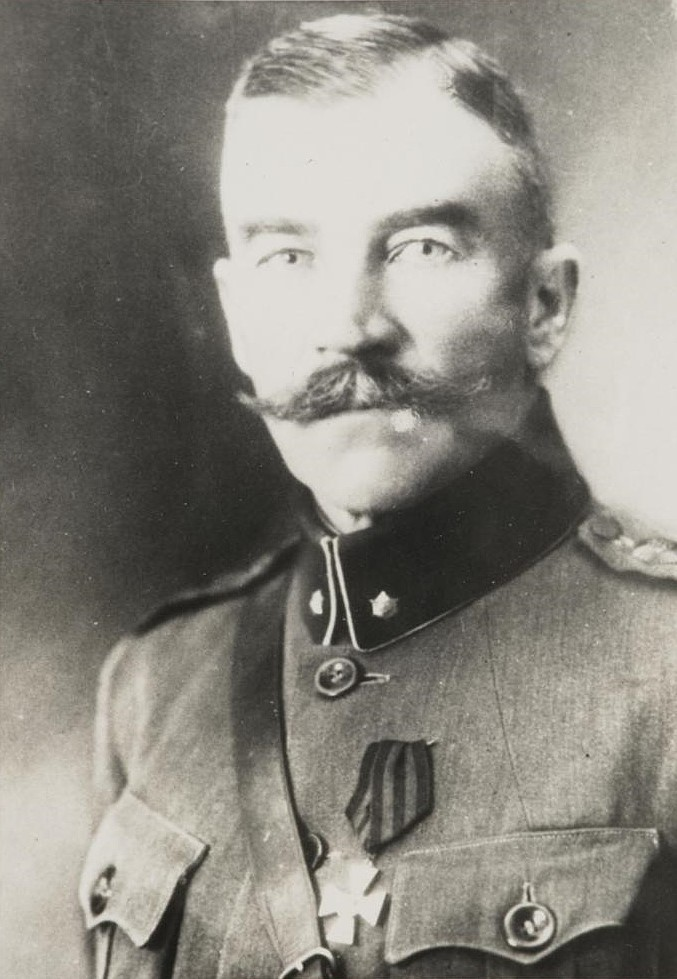
Silberg in the 1920s

Aleksander-Heinrich-Johann Silberg (30 April 1869 Narva – 24 January 1926 Tallinn) was a Russian and Estonian military personnel (Major-General).

After graduating from a commerce school in St. Petersburg, he conscripted himself to the Semyonov military unit (Estonian: Semjonovi kaardiväepolk).

He participated in World War I. In 1917 he has promoted to Major-General. During the war he joined to Nikolai Yudenich's Northwestern Army. In 1920 he moved to Estonia. He became the chief of Military Technology School (Estonian: sõjaväe Tehnikakool). Later he become the head of the military company Arsenal. In 1925 he retired. Silberg was buried in Kopli cemetery in the Tallinn suburb of Kopli.

Awards:

- 1916: Order of St. George
