= Voldemar Rieberg =

Estonian military personnel

Voldemar-Viktor Rieberg (before 1935 Riiberg; 12 May 1886 – 21 September 1952 Baden-Baden, Germany) was an Estonian military personnel (Major-General).

In 1911 he graduated from Tbilisi Military School. He participated in the Estonian War of Independence. During the war he was the commander of Engineering Battalion (Estonian: Inseneripataljon). From 1924 to 1939, he was on different posts at the Engineering Military Unit (Estonian: Insenerivägi).

Awards:

- 1939: Order of the Cross of the Eagle, II class.
