= Märt Tiru =

Estonian military officer (1947–2005)

Märt Tiru (10 October 1947 Tallinn – 18 October 2005) was an Estonian military officer (Brigadier General).

In 2000, he was appointed to the acting commander of the Estonian Defence Forces. In 2000s, he was also Military Attaché of Estonia to the United States.

In 2001, he was awarded by the Order of the Cross of the Eagle, III class.
