= Hans Leesment =

Estonian general (1873–1944)

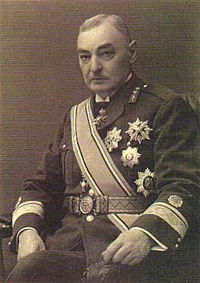
Hans Leesment

Hans Leesment (13 February 1873 – 26 August 1944 in Tallinn) was an Estonian general. From 1919 up until 1940, he was a founder, and the president, of the Estonian Red Cross. On 24 February 1933 he was promoted to the rank of major general.
