= Herbert Brede =

Estonian general

Herbert Lorentz Bred
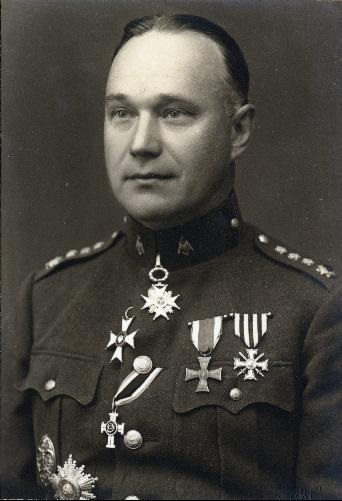
- Brede, c. 1930.
- Born: 25 April 1888; Püssi, Kreis Wierland, Governorate of Estonia, Russian Empire
- Died: 6 October 1942 (aged 54); Norilsk, Krasnoyarsk Krai, Russian SFSR, Soviet Union
- Military career
- Allegiance: Russian Empire
- Branch: Imperial Russian Army
- Conflicts: First World War; Estonian War of Independence

Herbert Lorentz Brede (25 April 1888 in Püssi – 6 October 1942 in Norilsk) was an Estonian soldier and general.

Brede fought in World War I as an officer of the Imperial Russian Army against the Central Powers. After World War I he fought against the Red Army in the Estonian War of Independence.

After Estonia was occupied by the Soviet Union, he was transferred to the Soviet Army. When Germany invaded Estonia in June 1941, he was arrested by NKVD and sent to Norillag prison camp, where he was executed the next year.
