= Cross of Liberty (Estonia) =

Military decoration of Estonia

Estonian Cross of Liberty
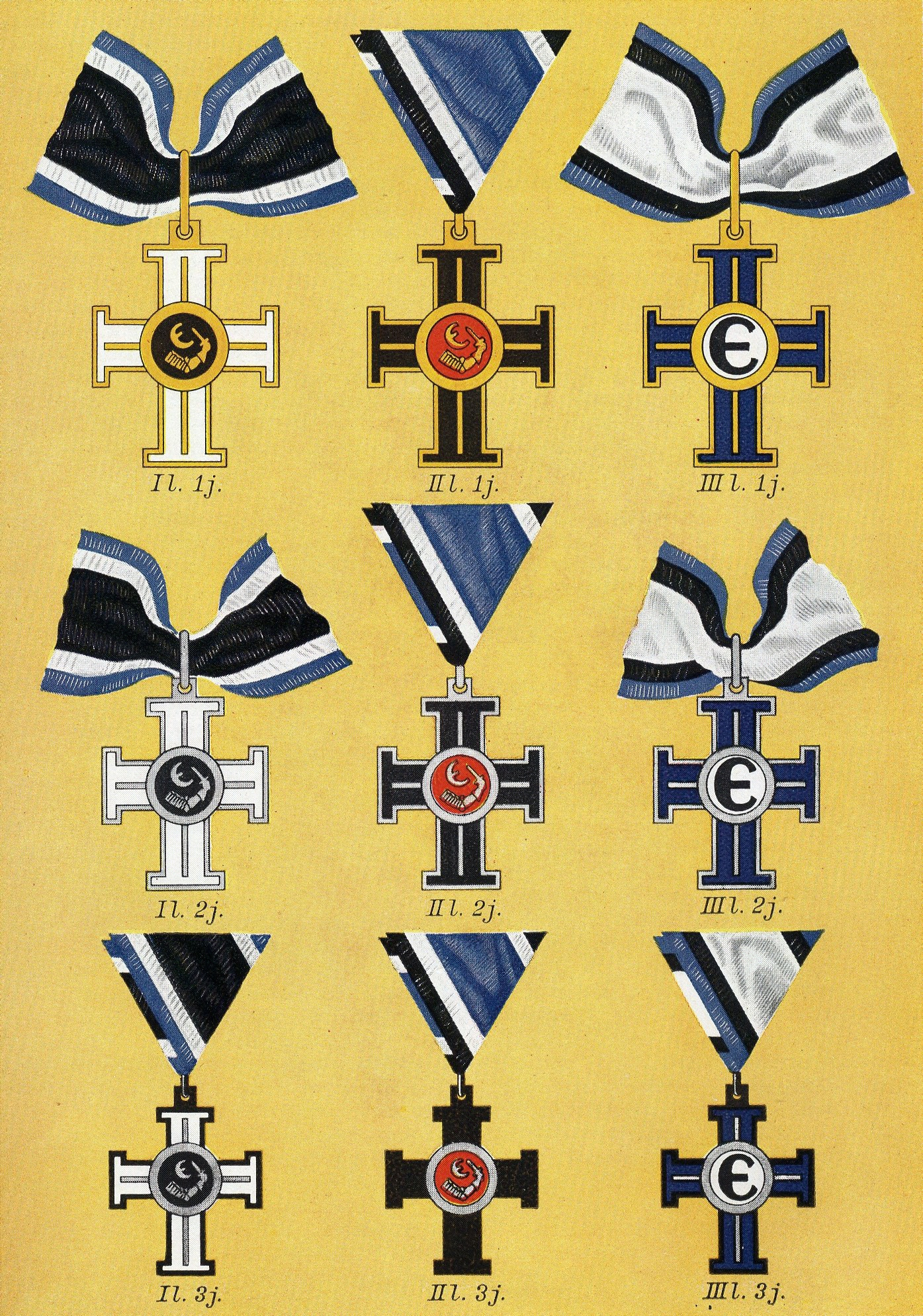
- Illustration of the three divisions of the Estonian Cross of Liberty with each in three classes
- Type: Military decoration
- Awarded for: Recognition for services during the Estonian War of Independence
- Presented by: Estonia
- Post-nominals: VR I/1 VR I/2 VR I/3; Military Leadership; VR II/1 VR II/2 VR II/3; Personal Courage; VR III/1 VR III/2 VR III/3; Civilian Services
- Status: No longer awarded
- Established: Estonian War of Independence
- First award: 24 February 1919
- Final award: 19 June 1925

Highlights
- Total: 3156
- Cross of Liberty for Military Leadership, Division I Cross of Liberty for Personal Courage, Division II Cross of Liberty for Civilian Service, Division III

Precedence
- Next (higher): None
- Equivalent: Order of the National Coat of Arms
- Next (lower): Order of the Cross of Terra Mariana

The Estonian Cross of Liberty (Estonian: Vabadusrist) is a military decoration established by the Prime Minister of Estonia, Konstantin Päts, on 24 February 1919 to honor the people for their services during the Estonian War of Independence. The Estonian Cross of Liberty has three divisions, each in three classes. Division I was granted for military leadership, division II for personal courage and division III for civilian services. The division and class of the Estonian Cross of Liberty is usually added to the name of the recipient in the form of post-nominal letters. The 1st class of the II division of the Estonian Cross of Liberty was never granted. Although still mentioned in the list of Estonian state decorations by the president of the republic, the bestowal of the Estonian Cross of Liberty was terminated on 19 June 1925.

The last surviving recipient of the Estonian Cross of Liberty was Karl Jaanus VR II/3, who died on 6 October 2000. The bestowal may be resumed in the case of a future war.

The Estonian War of Independence Victory Column in Tallinn, unveiled in 2009, is modelled according to the Estonian Cross of Liberty.

== Design ==
The designer of the Estonian Cross of Liberty was a famous Estonian artist Peet Aren. He used the Grand Master of the Teutonic Order (hochmeister's) cross as the basis for the shape of the Estonian Cross of Liberty.

== Notable recipients of the Estonian Cross of Liberty ==
- The British Unknown Warrior VR I/1
- The French Unknown Soldier VR I/1
- The Italian Unknown Soldier VR I/1
- The city of Verdun VR I/1
- Carl Aejemelaeus VR III/2
- Eduard Ahman VR I/3
- Albert I of Belgium VR I/1
- Edwyn Alexander-Sinclair VR I/1
- Jānis Balodis VR I/1
- David Beatty, 1st Earl Beatty VR I/1
- Stanley Baldwin, 1st Earl Baldwin of Bewdley VR III/1
- Arthur Balfour, 1st Earl of Balfour VR III/1
- Krišjānis Berķis VR I/2
- Richard Gustav Borgelin, VR I/2 and II/3
- Herbert Brede VR I/2
- Aristide Briand VR III/1
- William Clive Bridgeman, 1st Viscount Bridgeman VR III/1
- Rudolph Lambart, 10th Earl of Cavan VR I/1
- Robert Cecil, 1st Viscount Cecil of Chelwood VR III/1
- Sir Austen Chamberlain VR III/1
- Christian X of Denmark VR I/1
- Sir Winston Churchill VR I/1
- Georges Clemenceau VR III/1
- Walter Cowan VR I/1
- Armando Diaz, 1st Duke of the Victory VR I/1
- Józef Dowbor-Muśnicki VR I/2
- Gaston Doumergue VR III/1
- Eric Drummond, 16th Earl of Perth VR III/1
- Martin Ekström VR I/1 and VR II/3
- Carl Enckell VR III/1
- Rafael Erich VR III/1
- The Rt. Hon. Herbert Fisher VR III/1
- Ferdinand Foch VR I/1
- Pietro Gasparri VR III/1
- George V of the United Kingdom VR I/1
- Sir Hubert Gough VR I/1
- Gustaf V of Sweden VR III/1
- Douglas Haig, 1st Earl Haig VR I/1
- Józef Haller VR I/2
- Sir John Hanbury-Williams VR III/1
- Charles Hardinge, 1st Baron Hardinge of Penshurst VR III/1
- Otto Heinze VR I/2, VR II/3
- Miklós Horthy VR III/1
- Esme Howard, 1st Baron Howard of Penrith VR III/1
- Anton Irv VR I/2, VR II/2 and VR II/3
- Karl Jaanus VR II/3
- Gustav Jonson I/3 and II/2
- Kyösti Kallio VR III/1 and I/2
- Hans Kalm VR I/1 and VR II/3
- Hugo Kauler VR I/2
- Max Kennedy Horton VR I/2
- Lauri Kettunen VR III/2
- Julius Kuperjanov VR I/2, VR II/2 and II/3
- Friedrich Kurg, VR II/3
- Ants Kurvits VR I/2
- Johan Laidoner VR I/1 and III/1
- Andres Larka VR I/1
- Jaan Lepp VR II/2 and VR II/3
- Eduards Kalniņš I/2
- Hans Leesment VR III/2
- David Lloyd George, 1st Earl Lloyd George of Dwyfor VR III/1
- Karl Menning VR III/2
- Harri Moora VR II/3
- Benito Mussolini VR III/1
- Johannes Orasmaa VR I/2 and II/3
- Anton Õunapuu VR II/3
- Konstantin Päts VR I/1 and III/1
- Voldemar Päts VR III/2
- Paul Painlevé VR III/1
- Karl Parts VR I/1, II/2 and II/3
- Philippe Pétain VR I/1
- Józef Piłsudski VR I/1 and III/1
- Johan Pitka VR I/1
- Jaan Poska VR III/1
- Ernst Põdder VR I/1
- Konstantin Päts VR I/1 and III/1
- Viktor Puskar VR I/1
- Nikolai Reek VR I/2, II/2 and II/3
- August Rei VR III/1
- Rudolf Riives VR II/3
- Tõnis Rotberg VR I/2
- Theodor Rõuk VR I/2
- Count Tadeusz Rozwadowski VR I/2
- Edward Ryan VR I/2
- Conte Carlo Sforza VR III/1
- Władysław Sikorski VR III/1
- Karl-Johannes Soonpää VR II/3
- Jaan Soots VR I/1
- Kazimierz Sosnkowski VR I/2
- Otto Strandman VR III/1
- Stanisław Szeptycki VR I/2
- Otto Tief VR II/3
- Aleksander Tõnisson VR I/2
- William George Tyrrell, 1st Baron Tyrrell VR III/1
- Kārlis Ulmanis VR III/1
- Victor Emmanuel III of Italy VR III/1
- Aleksander Warma VR I/3
- Rosslyn Erskine-Wemyss, 1st Baron Wester Wemyss VR I/1
- Maxime Weygand VR I/1
- Werner Zoege von Manteuffel VR I/2
