= Põllküla =

Village in Estonia

- Village
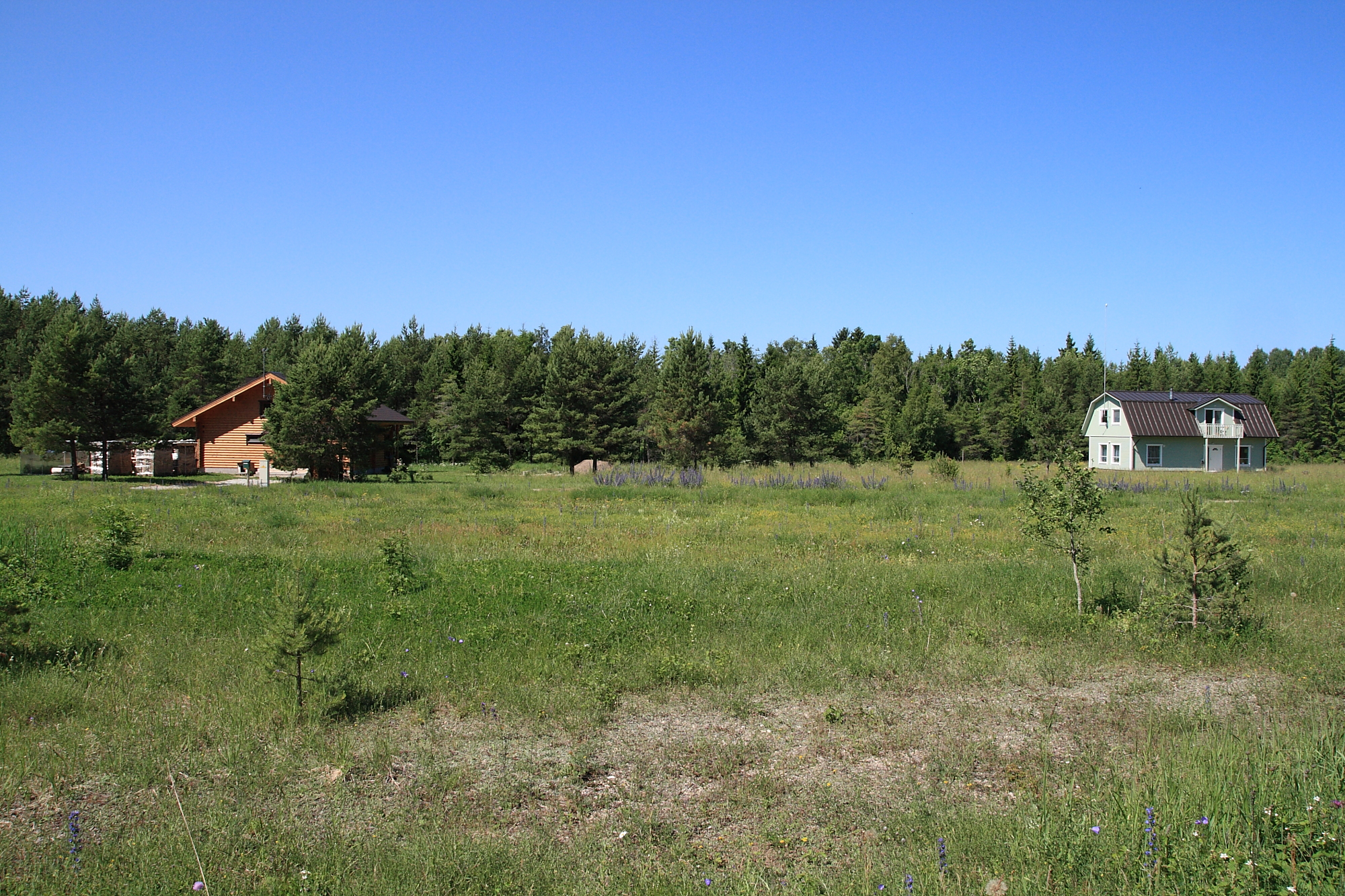

- Location within Estonia
- Coordinates: 59.3206°N 24.1808°E
- Country: Estonia
- County: Harju County
- Parish: Lääne-Harju Parish
- Time zone: UTC+2 (EET)
  - Summer (DST): UTC+3 (EEST)

Põllküla is a village in Lääne-Harju Parish in Harju County in northern Estonia. It had a population of 38 (1 January 2004).

Põllküla has a station on the Elron western route.

Vasalemma river borders Põllküla to the south.

A small portion of the eastern part of Põllküla's territory is covered by Klooga training area of the Estonian Defence Forces.

From 1942 to 1944 there was a quarantine camp of war refugees located in Põllküla. The refugees were mainly Finns from Ingria, but also other minorities (Estonians, Latvians, Russians) living in then German-occupied Leningrad oblast. Similar evacuation camps were also in nearby Klooga and Paldiski. The refugees who died in the camp waiting for further evacuation were buried in unidentified mass graves in and around Põllküla. Now there is a memorial for those who died in the camp. In the summer of 2018 a memorial tablet was opened in honor of the leader of the evacuation of the Finns, professor Pentti Kaitera.

== Gallery ==
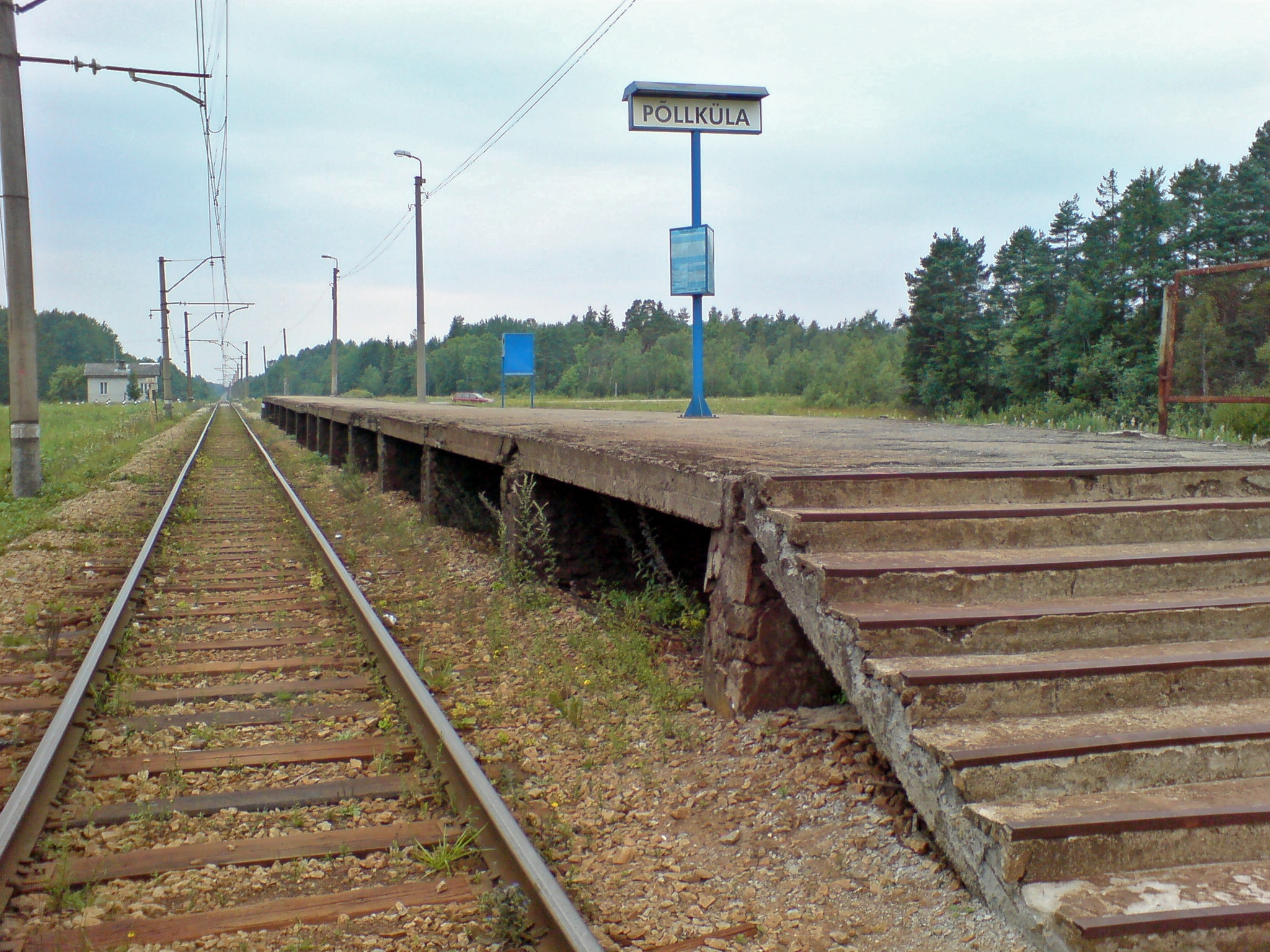
Station before renovation in 2007

Station after renovation in 2011

Põllküla station is one of the smallest on the westward Elektriraudtee line.

Preceding station	Elron	Following station
Klooga-Aedlinn towards Tallinn	Tallinn–Turba/Paldiski	Laoküla towards Paldiski
