= Klooga =

Klooga may refer to:

- Klooga, Estonia, a borough in Harju County, Estonia
- Lake Klooga, a lake in Klooga, Estonia
- Klooga concentration camp, a Nazi concentration camp (1943–1944)
- Klooga training area, Estonian Defence Forces training area (2008–present)
