= Armorial of Estonia =

The coats of arms of the 15 counties of Estonia are presented below.

== National ==
Estonia

== Military ==
Headquarters of the Estonian Defence Forces

Estonian Land Forces

Estonian Navy

Estonian Air Force

Estonian Special Operations Force

Estonian Defence League

=== Estonian Land Forces ===
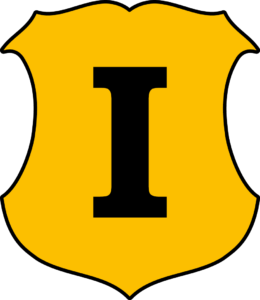
Estonian Division

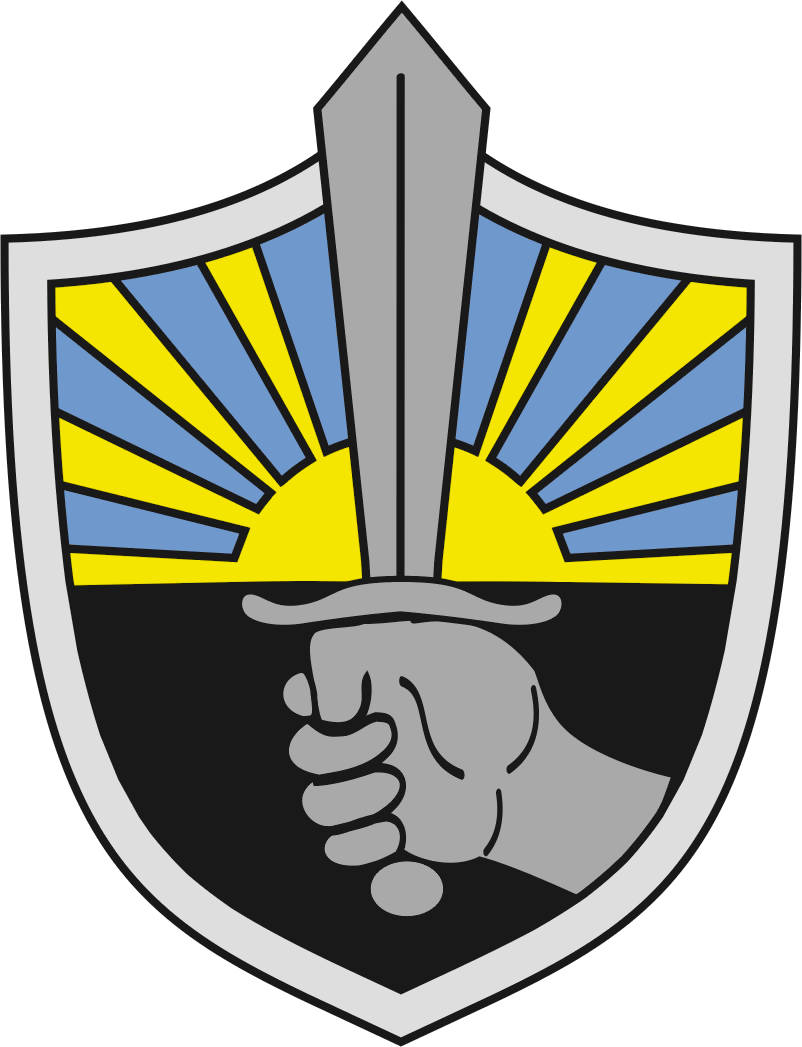
1st Infantry Brigade

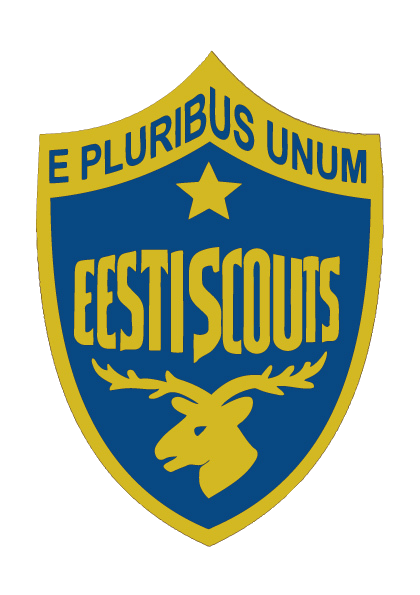
Scouts Battalion

Kalev Infantry Battalion

Viru Infantry Battalion

Artillery Regiment, Estonian Division

Air Defence Battalion

Engineer Battalion

Combat Service Support Battalion, 1st Infantry Brigade

2nd Infantry Brigade

Kuperjanov Infantry Battalion

Artillery Battalion, 2nd Infantry Brigade

Combat Service Support Battalion, 2nd Infantry Brigade

Military Police

Guard Battalion

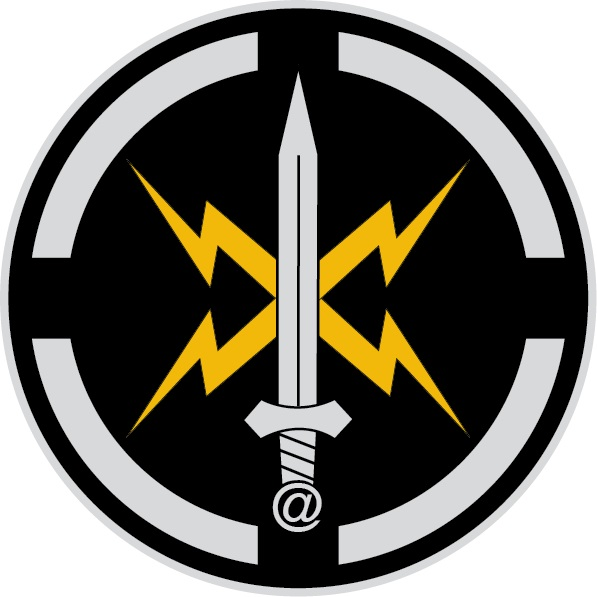
Cyber Command

Headquarters and Signal Battalion

Support Command

Logistics Battalion

=== Estonian Navy ===
Estonian Mineships Division

=== Estonian Air Force ===
Air Surveillance Wing

Ämari Air Base

Staff of Estonian Air Force

== Counties ==
Harju County

Hiiu County

Ida-Viru County

Jõgeva County

Järva County

Lääne County

Lääne-Viru County

Põlva County

Pärnu County

Rapla County

Saare County

Tartu County

Valga County

Viljandi County

Võru County

=== Harju County ===
Tallinn

Keila

Maardu

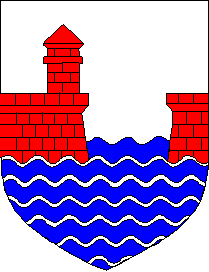
Paldiski

Anija Parish

Harku Parish

Jõelähtme Parish

Kiili Parish

Kose Parish

Kuusalu Parish

Loksa

Lääne-Harju Parish

Raasiku Parish

Rae Parish

Saku Parish

Saue Parish

Viimsi Parish

=== Hiiu County ===
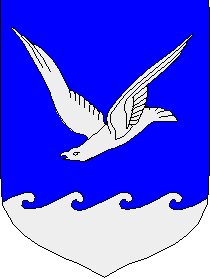
Kärdla

Emmaste Parish

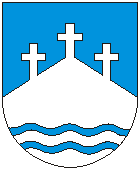
Kõrgessaare Parish

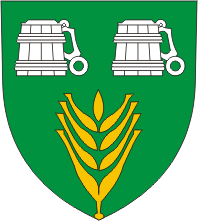
Käina Parish

Pühalepa Parish

=== Ida-Viru County ===
Kohtla-Järve

Narva

Sillamäe

Alutaguse Parish

Jõhvi Parish

Lüganuse Parish

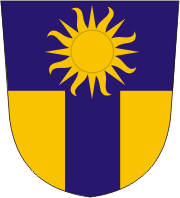
Narva-Jõesuu

Toila Parish

=== Jõgeva County ===
Jõgeva Parish

Mustvee Parish

Põltsamaa Parish

=== Järva County ===
Järva Parish

Paide

Türi Parish

=== Lääne County ===
Haapsalu

Lääne-Nigula Parish

Vormsi Parish

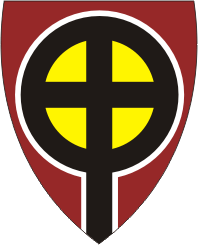
Ridala Parish

=== Lääne-Viru County ===
Rakvere

Haljala Parish

Kadrina Parish

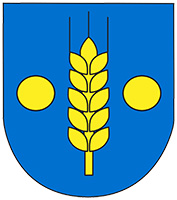
Rakvere Parish

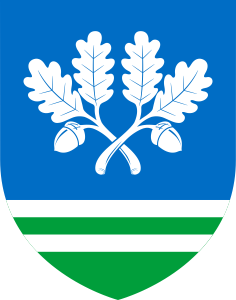
Tapa Parish

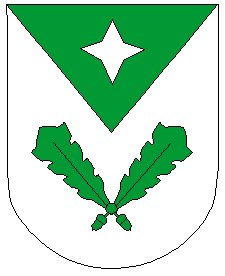
Vinni Parish

Viru-Nigula Parish

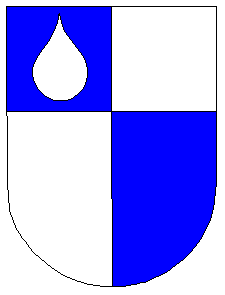
Väike-Maarja Parish

=== Põlva County ===
Kanepi Parish

Põlva Parish

Räpina Parish

=== Pärnu County ===
Pärnu

Häädemeeste Parish

Kihnu Parish

Lääneranna Parish

Põhja-Pärnumaa Parish

Saarde Parish

Tori Parish

=== Rapla County ===
Kehtna Parish

Kohila Parish

Märjamaa Parish

Rapla Parish

=== Saare County ===
Muhu Parish

Ruhnu Parish

Saaremaa Parish

=== Tartu County ===
Tartu

Elva Parish

Kambja Parish

Kastre Parish

Luunja Parish

Nõo Parish

Peipsiääre Parish

Tartu Parish

=== Valga County ===
Otepää Parish

Tõrva Parish

Valga Parish

=== Viljandi County ===
Viljandi

Mulgi Parish

Põhja-Sakala Parish

Viljandi Parish

=== Võru County ===
Võru

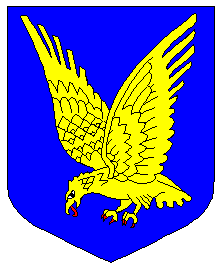
Antsla Parish

Rõuge Parish

Setomaa Parish

Võru Parish

== Historical Arms ==
Livonian Brothers of the Sword

Denmark

Bishopric of Ösel–Wiek

State of the Teutonic Order

Livonian Confederation

Kalmar Union

Kalmar Union

Kalmar Union

Denmark–Norway

Denmark–Norway

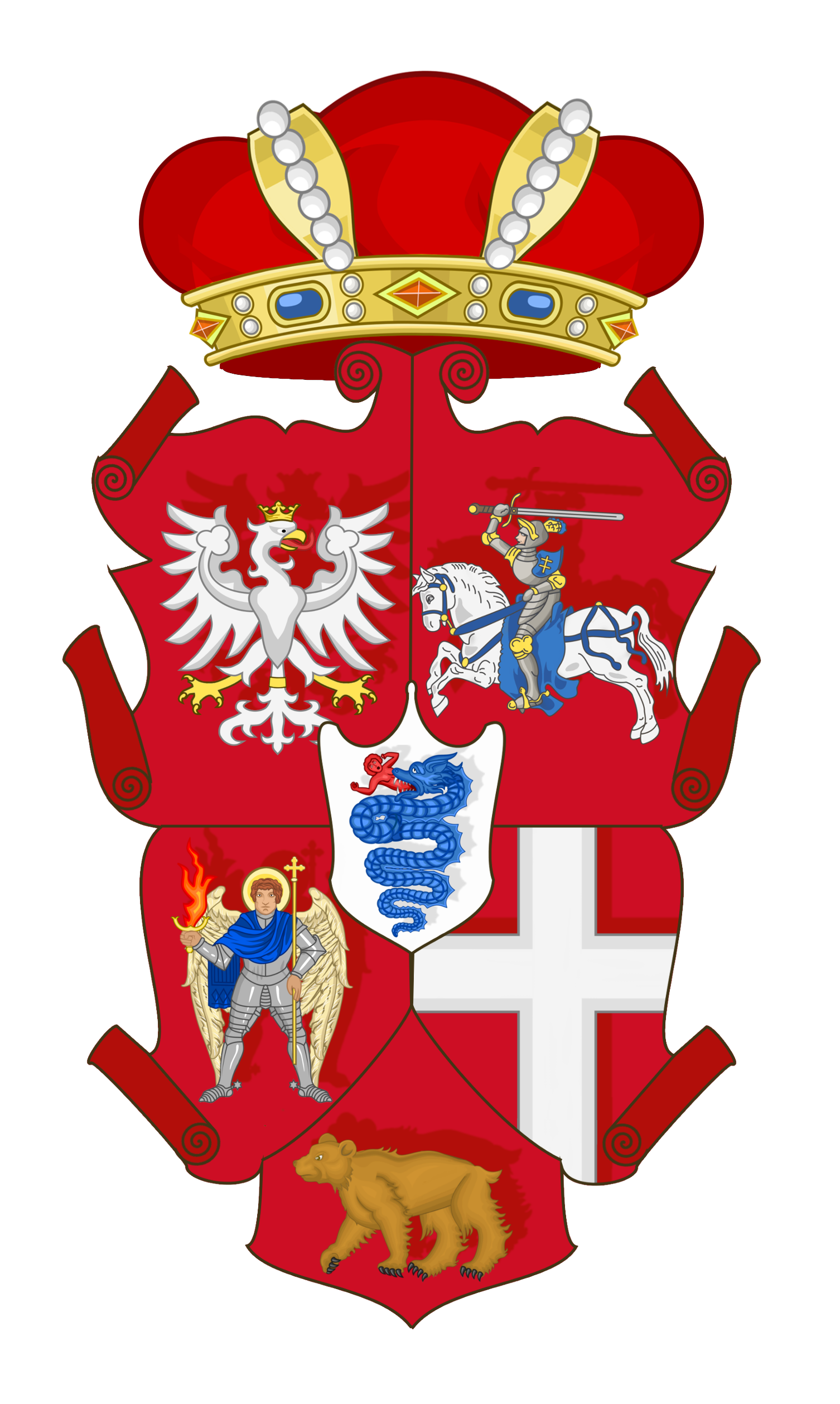
Poland–Lithuania

Poland–Lithuania

Poland–Lithuania

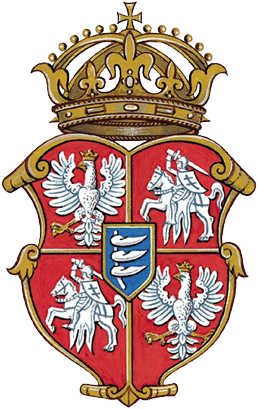
Poland–Lithuania

Duchy of Livonia

Kingdom of Livonia

Sweden

Sweden

Sweden and Poland–Lithuania

Sweden

Sweden

Swedish Estonia

Tsardom of Russia

Russian Empire

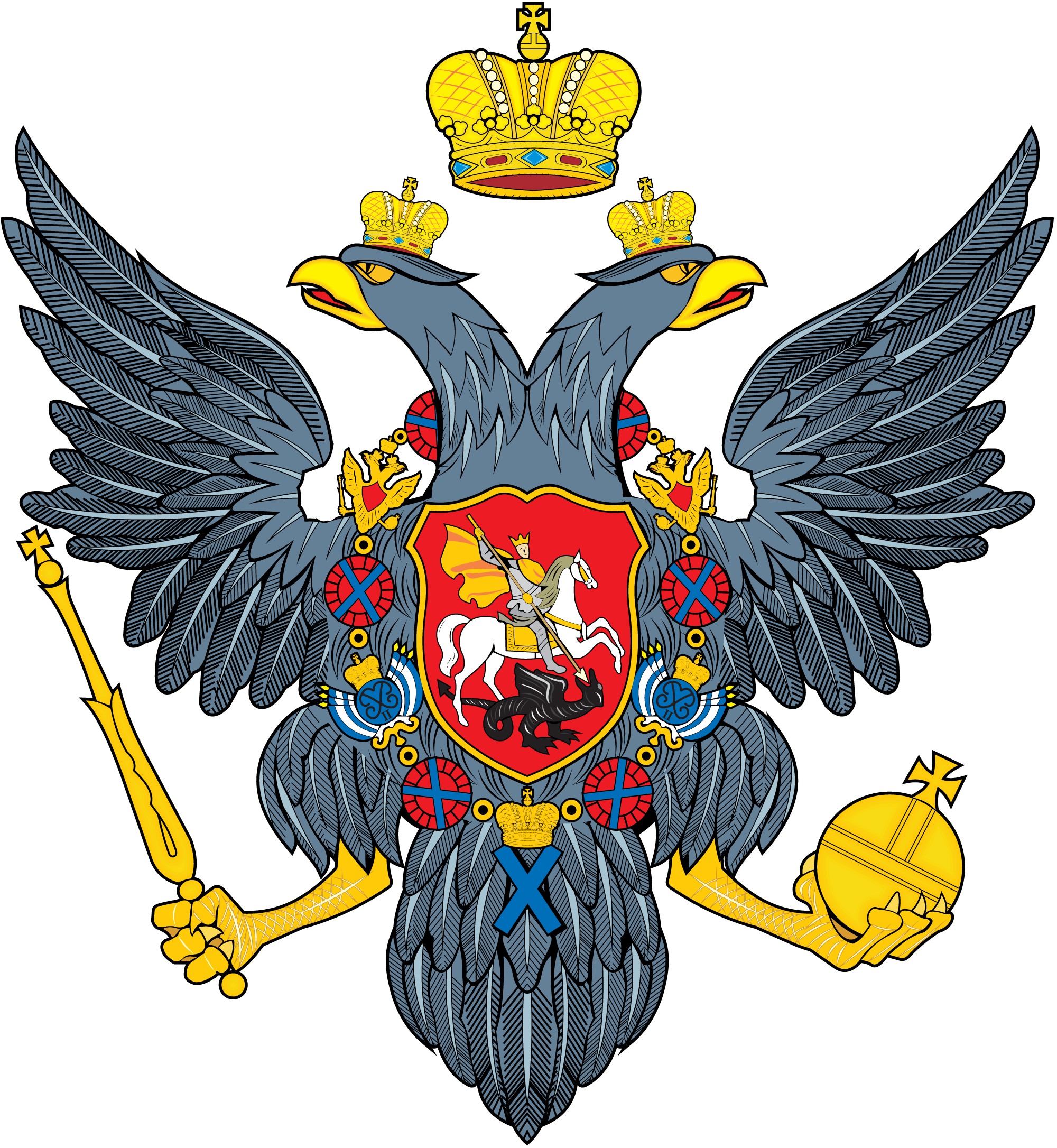
Russian Empire

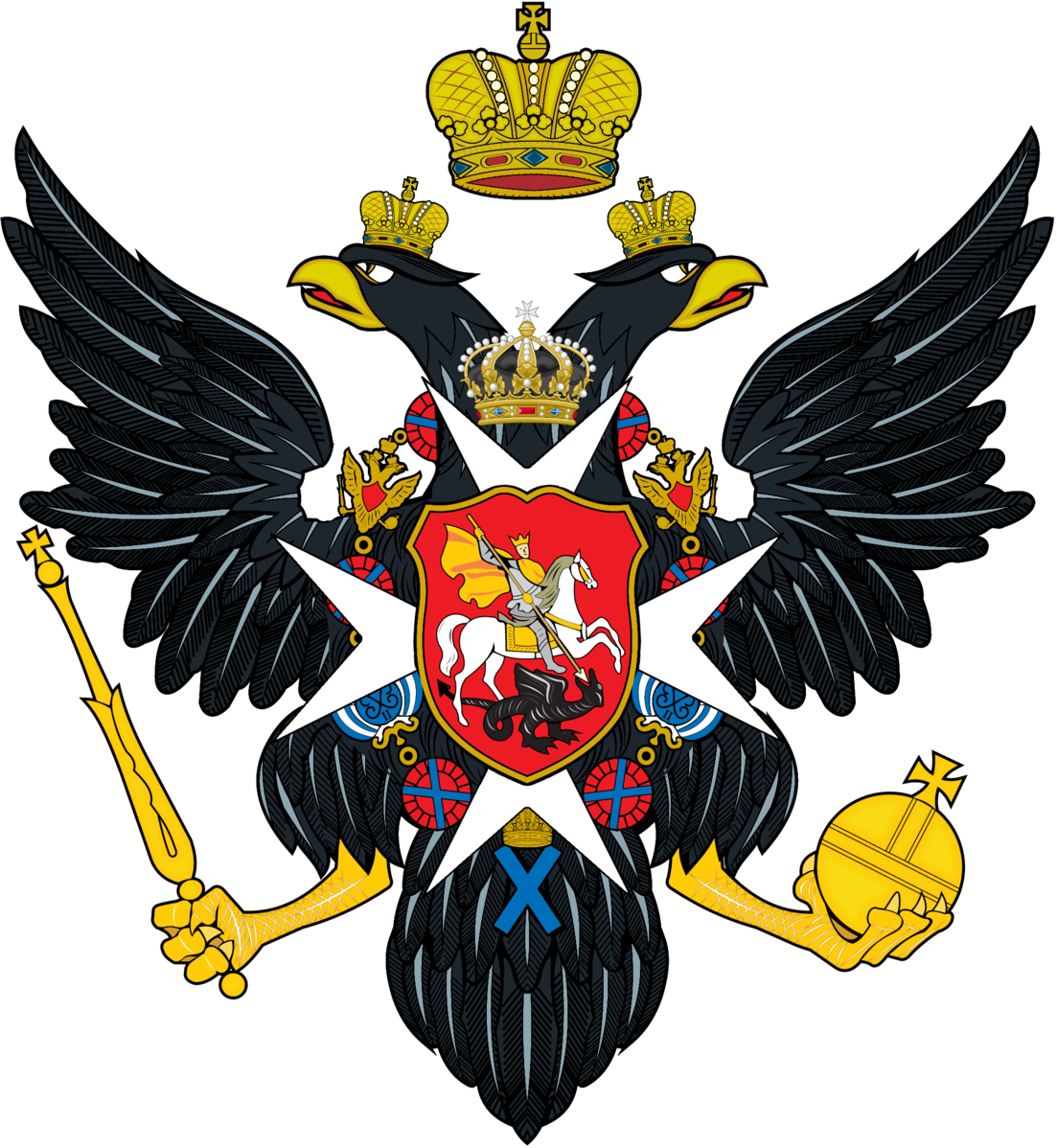
Russian Empire

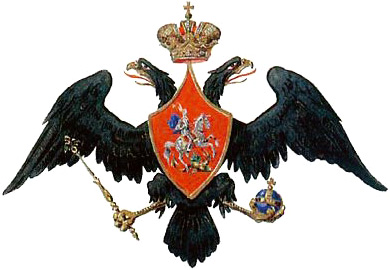
Russian Empire

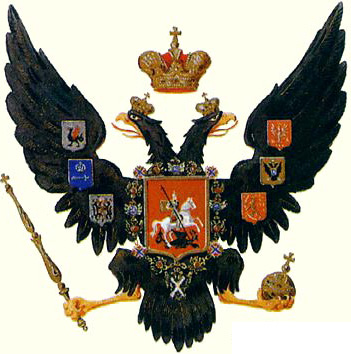
Russian Empire

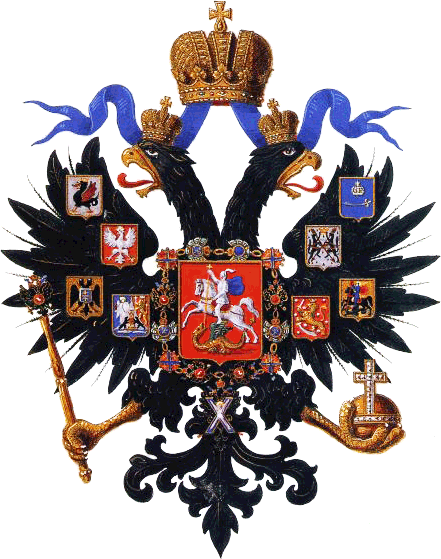
Russian Empire

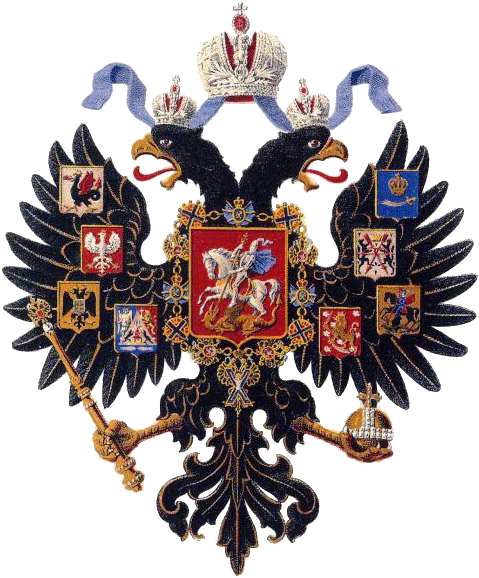
Russian Empire

Russian Empire

Russian Estonia

Russian Livonia

German Empire

Estonian Soviet Socialist Republic

== Colleges ==
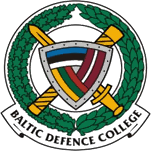
Baltic Defence College

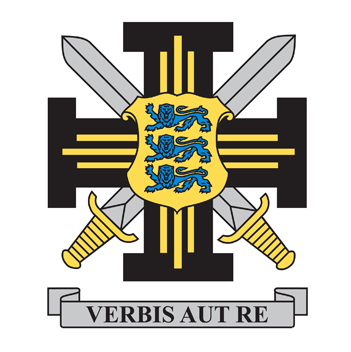
Estonian Academy of Security Sciences

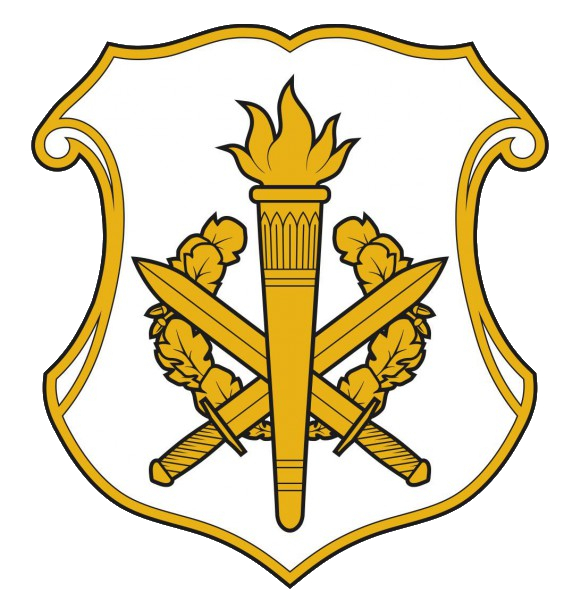
Estonian Military Academy

== See also ==
- Flags of Estonian counties
