= Maeru =

Village in Estonia

Coordinates: 59°15′N 24°17′E

- Village
- Interactive map of Maeru
- Country: Estonia
- County: Harju County
- Parish: Lääne-Harju Parish
- Time zone: UTC+2 (EET)
  - Summer (DST): UTC+3 (EEST)

Maeru is a village in Lääne-Harju Parish, Harju County in northern Estonia.

Vasalemma river passes through Maeru.

A small portion of the northwestern part of Maeru's territory is covered by Klooga training area of the Estonian Defence Forces.
