= Headquarters and Signal Battalion =

Estonian military unit

- Staabi- ja sidepataljon
- Insignia of the Headquarters and Signal Battalion
- Active: 1918–1940; 1993–present
- Country: Estonia
- Branch: Estonian Land Forces
- Type: Signal corps
- Role: Military communications
- Size: Battalion
- Part of: Estonian Division
- Garrison/HQ: Ämari Air Base
- Anniversaries: 21 November 1918
- Engagements: Estonian War of Independence; Soviet occupation of Estonia (1940)

Commanders
- Current commander: Lieutenant colonel Veiko Raaper

The Headquarters and Signal Battalion (Estonian: Staabi- ja sidepataljon) is a battalion sized signal unit of the Estonian Land Forces. It is a part of the Cyber Command and its primary task is to ensure communication between the different units of the Estonian Defence Forces, Estonian Defence League and to train reserve signal officers. The battalion must also ensure the strategic signalling and information technology support for the Defence Forces and realise development projects in the area of defence, information technology and electronic warfare.

The battalion is currently based at Ämari Air Base and is commanded by Lieutenant colonel Veiko Raaper.

== History ==
The predecessor of the battalion was established on 21 November 1918 at the beginning of the Estonian War of Independence. Even though the unit changed its name multiple times during the conflict, it still maintained its original mission to ensure communications between headquarters and fronts.

After the war in 1924, various radio and telegraph units were merged into a battalion sized unit, the Signal Battalion (Estonian: Sidepataljon). By 1940, the battalion had become a modern signal corps with proper equipment and training.

=== Battle of Raua Street ===
When the Soviet Union occupied Estonia in June 1940, the Signal Battalion was ordered to relocate from its garrison to a building of a local Tallinn high school (school Number 21) and surrender its weaponry. When the communists also came for the signallers' personal items, they were kicked out of the building. By the time they came back with Red Army soldiers, the signallers had already armed themselves and a shootout broke out between the opposing sides. The building was attacked by 6 armoured cars and heavy machine guns. By the end of the battle, the Estonians had suffered 1 killed and 3 wounded, and the Red Army had suffered at least 10 dead. It was the only armed act of resistance from the Estonian Defence Forces against the occupying Soviets.

After these events, the Signal Battalion was merged into the Red Army's 22nd Rifle Corps which was destroyed during the Baltic Operation in 1941.

=== 1993-present ===
On 29 October 1993, the battalion was re-established as the Detached Signal Battalion (Estonian: Üksik-sidepataljon) and the unit returned to its old garrison in Juhkentali, Tallinn which they had to leave from in 1940.

In 2011, the battalion adopted its current name.

In 2021, the battalion relocated to Ämari Air Base.

== Current structure ==
Headquarters and Signal Battalion:

- Battalion Headquarters
  - Signal School
  - HQ Company
  - Signal Company
  - HQ Defence Service

== See also ==
- Cyber Command
- Electronic warfare
- Cyberwarfare
