= Klooga training area =

Military training area in Estonia

Klooga harjutusväli Klooga training area
- Near Keila and Paldiski in Estonia

Site information
- Type: military training area
- Operator: Estonian Defence Forces
- Status: active

Location
- Coordinates: 59°19′N 24°12′E
- Area: 989.9 ha (2,446 acres)

Site history
- In use: 2008

Klooga training area is one of the six military training fields used by the Estonian Defence Forces. It is located in lääne-Harju Parish, Harju County. Most of its territory of 990 ha (2,400 acres) is within the borders of Klooga small borough while small portions of Põllküla and Maeru village territories are also included.

== History ==
During the Soviet occupation of Estonia, Klooga training area was one of the Soviet Army motorized rifle divisions military campus with the area of 1373 ha. It appears that the 36th Guards Motor Rifle Division was based there in the late 1950s.

=== Establishment ===
Klooga training area was established on 24 July 2008, with the Government Order No. 334 "Establishment of the Defense Forces Klooga training area."

== See also ==
- Keskpolügoon
