= Klooga, Estonia =

Borough in Estonia

Klooga
- Small borough
- Location within Estonia
- Coordinates: 59°19.2′N 24°12.84′E
- Country: Estonia
- County: Harju County
- Municipality: Lääne-Harju Parish

Klooga is a small borough (Estonian: alevik) in Lääne-Harju Parish in Harju County in northern Estonia. At the 2011 Census, the settlement's population was 1,203, of whom 642 (53.4%) were Estonians .

During the German occupation in World War II, Klooga concentration camp, a Nazi labor camp, was situated there as a satellite camp of Vaivara concentration camp. On 19 September 1944, about 2,000 inmates of the Klooga camp were executed and the corpses burned on pyres.

During the Soviet occupation of Estonia, large parts of the borough were reserved for Soviet military use. In 1949, Red Army forces were allocated an area of 1,513 hectares between the Vasalemma River, Lake Klooga and Tallinn–Paldiski Railway. Until 1994, the 144th Guards Motor Rifle Division of the Baltic Military District was located in the Klooga area: 488th Rifle Regiment, 450th Mobile Artillery Regiment, 1082nd Anti-aircraft Missile Regiment, 148th Single Reconnaissance Battalion (on Tond and Klooga), 1281st Separate Anti-Tank Divizion, 771st fire and rescue command and the weapons depots and untouchable reserve depots of the Klooga garrison.

In 1966, the 3rd Separate Tank Battalion was transferred from Dejevo on Saaremaa, near Lake Karujärv to Klooga, where it operated until 1980.

The Klooga military camp was located in the Klooga manor located near Lake Klooga. In addition to the manor house used as headquarters, there were two barracks, a canteen, and other buildings. After the departure of the Soviet troops, most of the buildings in the military camp fell into disrepair and were demolished, except for the Klooga officers' house.

In the twenty-first century, a large area of the settlement is covered by the Estonian Defence Forces' military Klooga training area.

Klooga has rail stations Klooga and Klooga-Aedlinn on the Elron western route.

== Gallery ==
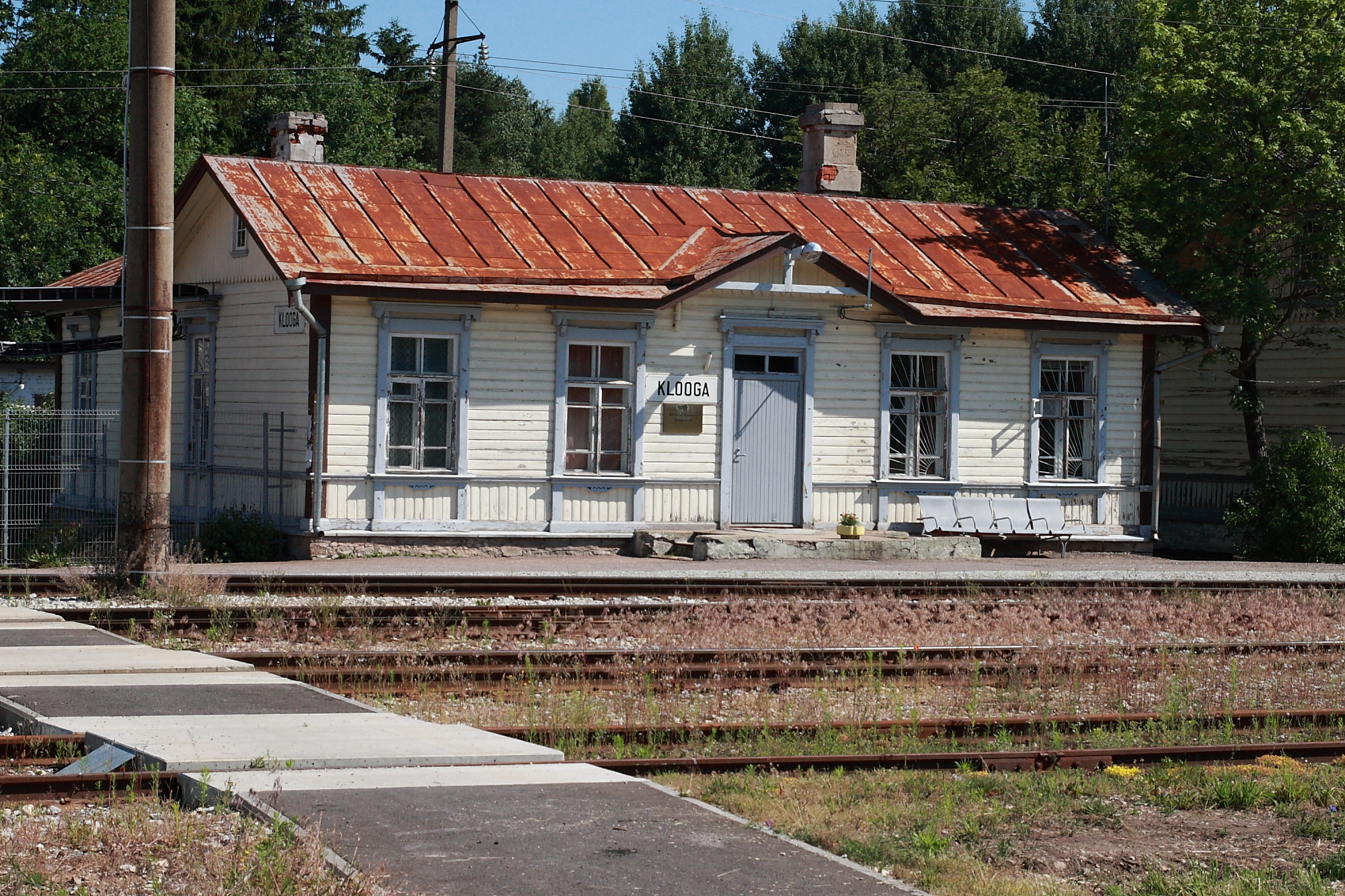
Klooga railway station

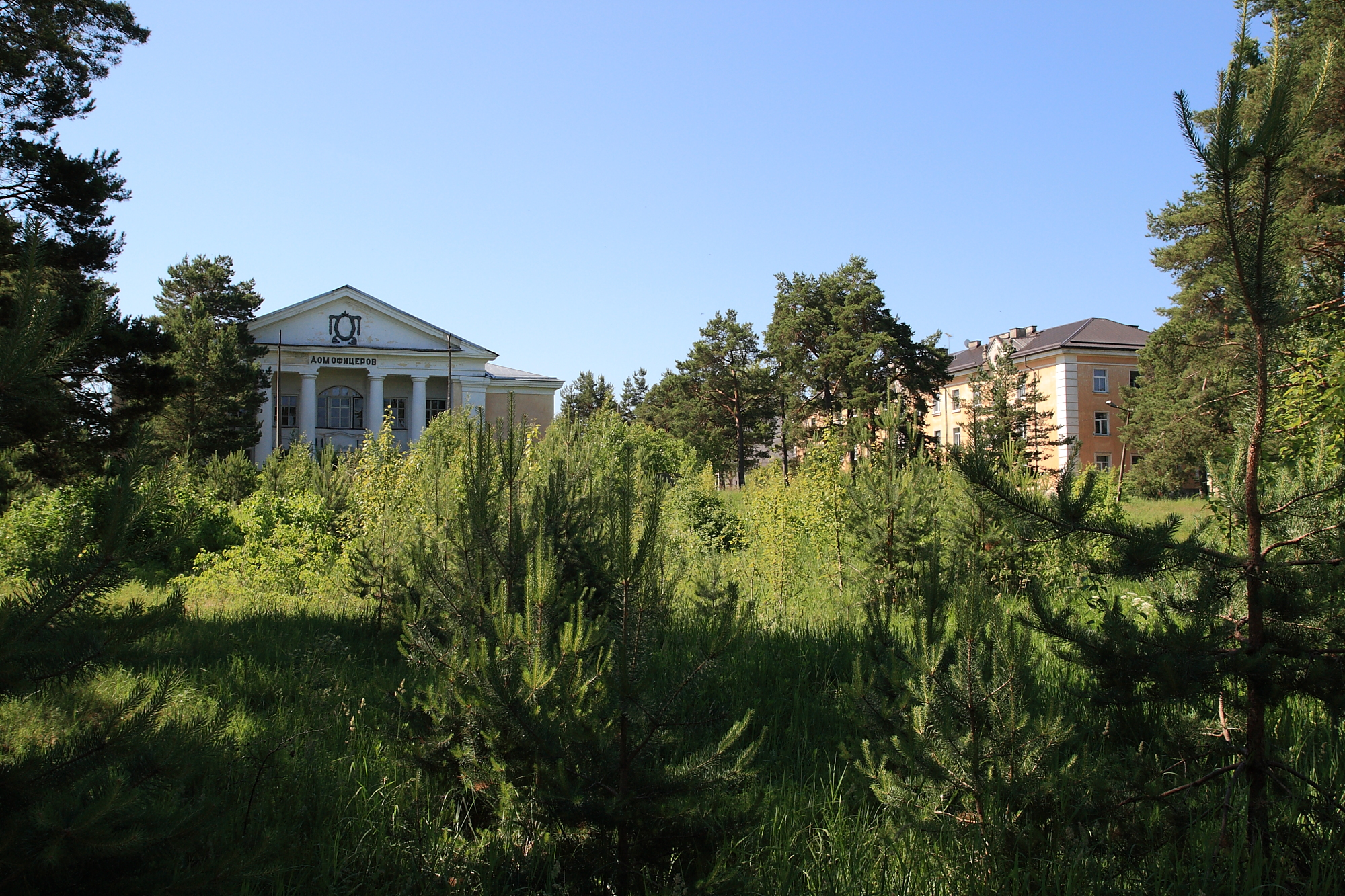
Former Soviet Army buildings

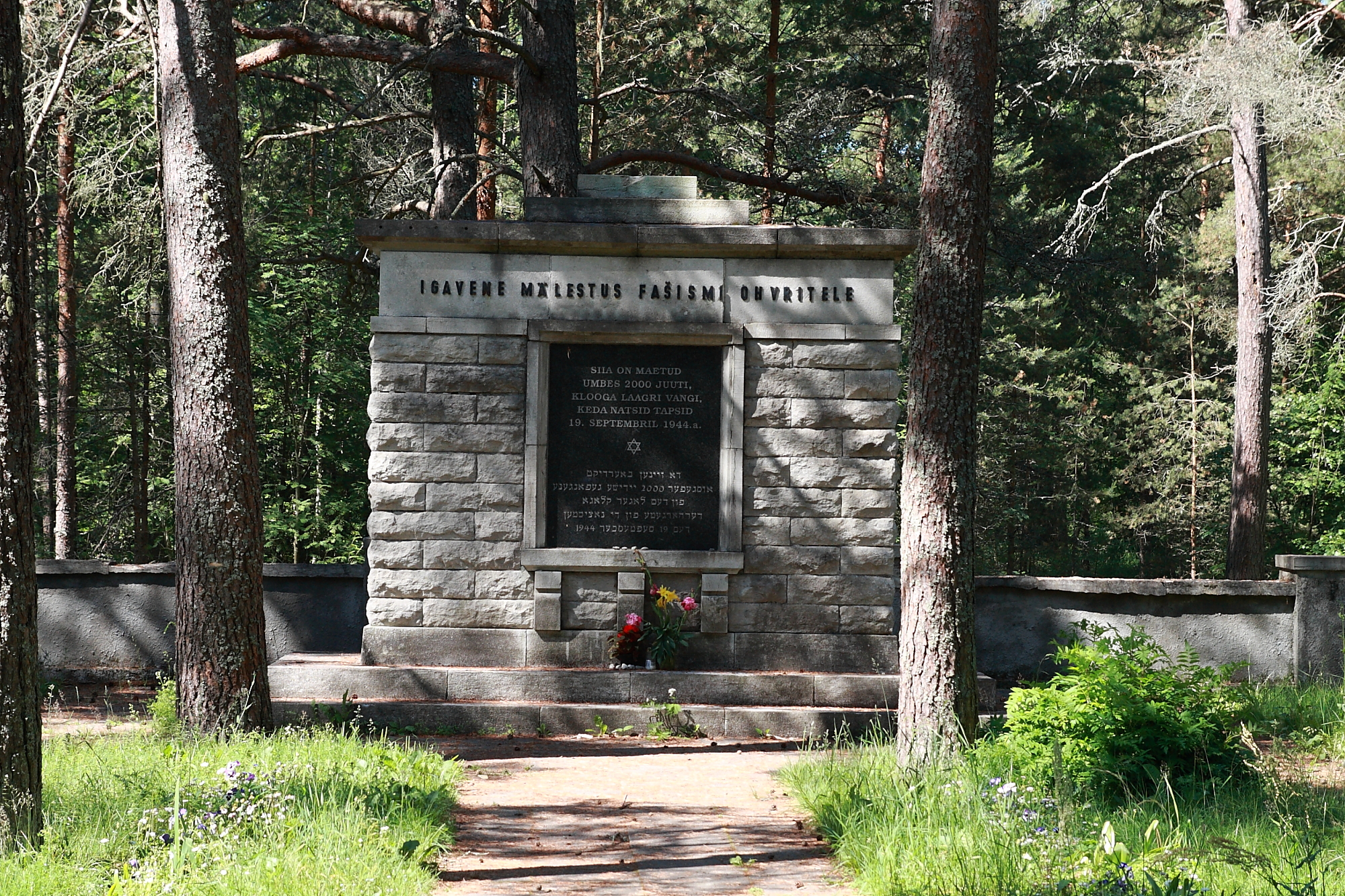
Grave of Holocaust victims at Klooga cemetery

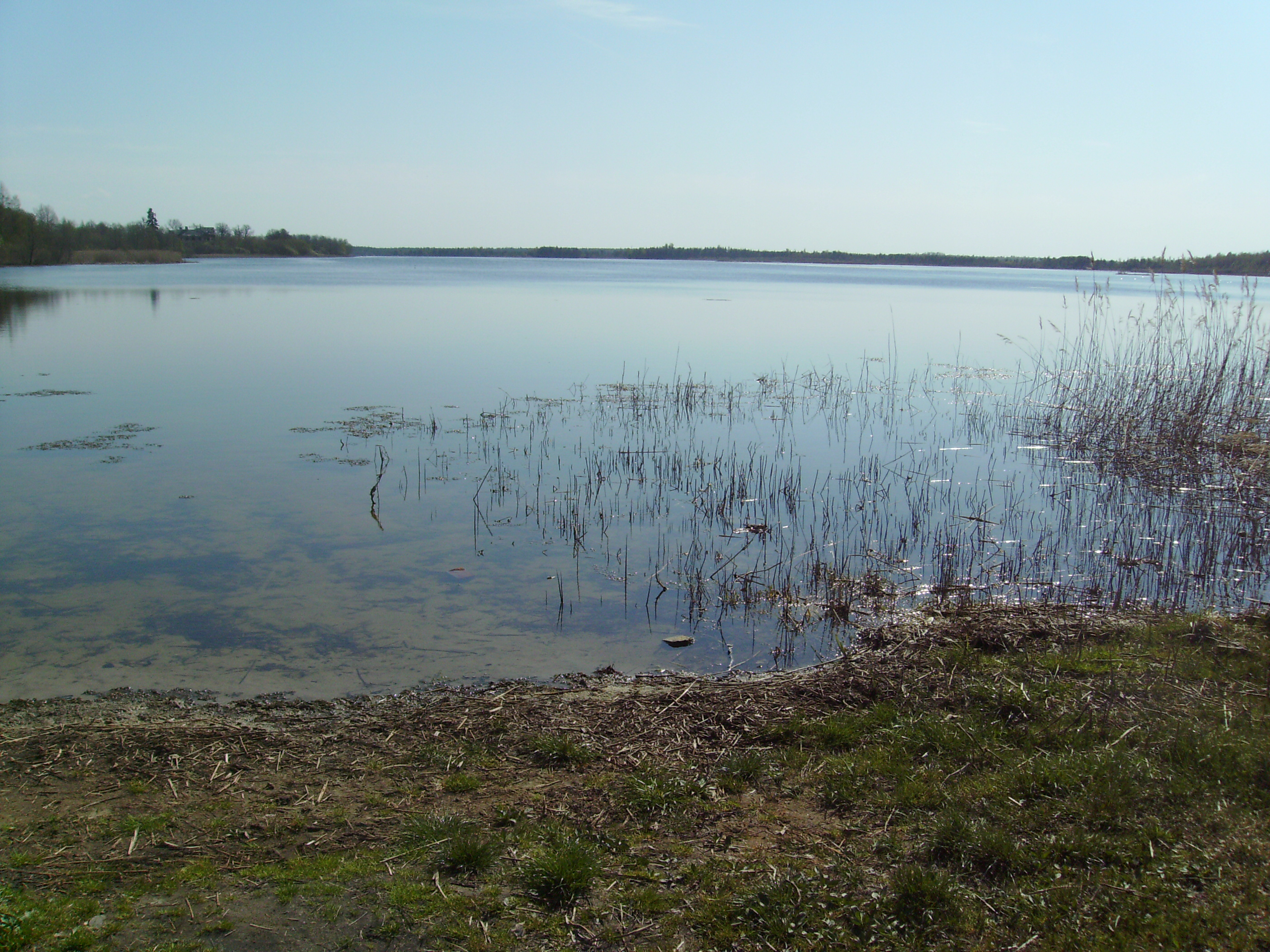
Lake Klooga

== See also ==
- Kloogaranna

Preceding station	Elron	Following station
Niitvälja towards Tallinn	Tallinn–Turba/Paldiski	Klooga-Aedlinn towards Paldiski
Niitvälja towards Tallinn	Tallinn–Turba/Paldiski	Kloogaranna Terminus
