= Military ranks of Estonia =

Present Estonian system of rank insignia is a direct descendant of various systems used in the past in the Estonian Defence Forces. Some of the grades trace their name back to the period of World Wars, for instance, the rank of aspirant literally means an officer in training in military academies or voluntaries, serving as temporary officers.

Most of the Estonian Army ranks were established during the Estonian War of Independence and in the 1920s. These include the rank of kapral, which is a derivate of Italian caporale – much like the English equivalent of corporal. After the Soviet occupation ended in 1991, a new rank was established, creating for the first time a brigadier general rank in the armed forces of Estonia. In Estonia, rank insignia is worn on the chest. Estonian Junior NCOs are considered as a rank of a conscript NCO or NCO in reserve. In full-time service, junior sergeants and petty officers 3rd class are filling in various soldier positions, and naval ratings and are not taken as NCOs.

== Commissioned officer ranks ==
The rank insignia of commissioned officers.

NATO code	OF-10	OF-9	OF-8	OF-7	OF-6	OF-5	OF-4	OF-3	OF-2	OF-1
Estonian Land Forces
Estonian Land Forces		Kindral	Kindralleitnant	Kindralmajor	Brigaadikindral	Kolonel	Kolonelleitnant	Major	Kapten	Leitnant	Nooremleitnant	Lipnik
Estonian Navy
Estonian Navy		Admiral	Viitseadmiral	Kontradmiral	Kommodoor	Mereväekapten	Kaptenleitnant	Kaptenmajor	Vanemleitnant	Leitnant	Nooremleitnant	Lipnik
Estonian Air Force
Estonian Air Force		Kindral	Kindralleitnant	Kindralmajor	Brigaadikindral	Kolonel	Kolonelleitnant	Major	Kapten	Leitnant	Nooremleitnant	Lipnik
NATO code	OF-10	OF-9	OF-8	OF-7	OF-6	OF-5	OF-4	OF-3	OF-2	OF-1

=== Student officer ranks ===
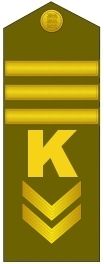
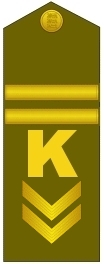
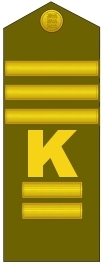
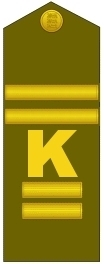
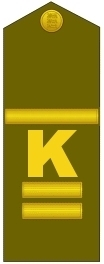
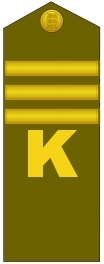
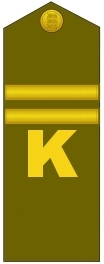
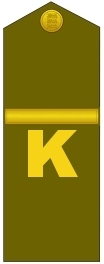
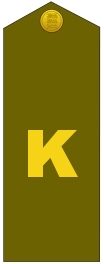
Rank group	Officer candidates					Student officers
	3. õppeaasta kadett-veebel	2. õppeaasta kadett-veebel	3. õppeaasta kadett-seersant	2. õppeaasta kadett-seersant	1. õppeaasta kadett-seersant	3. õppeaasta kadett	2. õppeaasta kadett	1. õppeaasta kadett	1. semestri noorkadett

== Other ranks ==
The rank insignia of non-commissioned officers and enlisted personnel.

NATO code	OR-9		OR-8	OR-7	OR-6	OR-5	OR-4		OR-3	OR-2	OR-1
Estonian Land Forces
Estonian Land Forces	Ülemveebel	Staabiveebel	Vanemveebel	Veebel	Nooremveebel	Vanemseersant	Seersant	Nooremseersant		Kapral	Reamees
Estonian Navy
Estonian Navy	Ülemveebel	Staabiveebel	Vanemveebel	Veebel	Nooremveebel	Vanemmaat	Maat	Nooremmaat		Vanemmadrus	Madrus
Estonian Air Force
Estonian Air Force	Ülemveebel	Staabiveebel	Vanemveebel	Veebel	Nooremveebel	Vanemseersant	Seersant	Nooremseersant		Kapral	Reamees
NATO code	OR-9		OR-8	OR-7	OR-6	OR-5	OR-4		OR-3	OR-2	OR-1

=== Reserve ranks ===
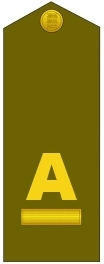
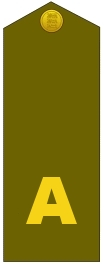
Rank group	Reserve
	Ajateenijate reservrühmaülema kursuse lõpetanu	Ajateenijate reservrühmaülema kursusel õppija

== Historical Estonian Defence League insignia ==
The separate rank system used for the Estonian Defence League was officially abolished in 2013, and it now uses ranks and insignia identical to the Land Forces.

Rank group	Higher and staff positions			Senior field positions				Junior field positions
Estonian Defence League
Estonian Defence League	Kaitseliidu ülem	Kaitseliidu Peastaabi ülem	Kaitseliidu maleva pealik	Maleva vaneminstruktor	Malevkonna pealik	Kompanii pealik	Rühma pealik	Rühmapealik eriüksustes	Rühmapealiku abi	Jaopealik	Jaopealiku abi
Positions	Commander	Chief of Staff	Chief of Malev	Senior instructor	Chief of Malevkond	Chief of Company	Platoon commander	Platoon commander in special forces	Assistant platoon commander	Section commander	Assistant section commander

== Historic ranks ==
=== Commissioned officer ranks ===
The rank insignia of commissioned officers.

Rank group	General / flag officers			Senior officers			Junior officers
Estonian Land Forces (1936–1940)
Estonian Land Forces (1936–1940)	Kindral	Kindralleitnant	Kindralmajor	Kolonel	Kolonelleitnant	Major	Kapten	Leitnant	Nooremleitnant	Lipnik

== See also ==
- Estonian Defence Forces
