= Estonian Defence Forces =

Unified military force of Estonia

- Eesti Kaitsevägi
- Emblem of the Estonian Defence Forces

- Flag of the Estonian Defence Forces
- Founded: 12 November 1918; 108 years ago
- Current form: 3 September 1991; 35 years ago
- Service branches: Estonian Land Forces; Estonian Navy; Estonian Air Force; Supported by: Estonian Defence League
- Headquarters: Headquarters of the Estonian Defence Forces, Tallinn
- Website: mil.ee/en

Leadership
- President: Ülle Madise
- Prime Minister: Kristen Michal
- Minister of Defence: Martin Herem
- Commander of the Defence Forces: Lieutenant General Andrus Merilo
- Deputy Commander of Defence Forces: Major General Viktor Kalnitski
- Command Sergeant Major: CSM Andreas Rebane

Personnel
- Military age: 18
- Conscription: 8 or 11 months (12 months from 2027 on)
- Active personnel: 8,200 (4,000 conscripts)
- Reserve personnel: 230,000 (38,800 in rapid response readiness, 80,000 have received training)
- Deployed personnel: 141

Expenditure
- Budget: €2.402 billion (2026)
- Percent of GDP: 5.43% (2026)

Related articles
- History: Estonian War of Independence; World War II; Kosovo Force; Iraq War; War in Afghanistan; Mali War; Operation Aspides
- Ranks: Military ranks of Estonia

The Estonian Defence Forces (EDF; Estonian: Eesti Kaitsevägi), is the unified military force of the Republic of Estonia. The EDF consists of the Estonian Land Forces, the Estonian Navy and Estonian Air Force, while supported by the paramilitary Estonian Defence League. The national defence policy aims to guarantee the preservation of the independence and sovereignty of the state and maintain the integrity of its land area, territorial waters, airspace, and constitutional order. Its main goals remain the development and maintenance of a credible capability to defend the nation's vital interests and of the defence forces in a way that ensures their interoperability with the armed forces of NATO and European Union member states in order to participate in the full range of missions for these military alliances.

== History ==
The Estonian Defence Forces has its origins linked to the Estonian War of Independence. After the first phase of the German Revolution in November 1918 ended the German occupation in Estonia, the representatives of Germany formally handed over political and military power to the Government of Estonia. A few days later, Estonia was invaded by Soviet Russian military forces, marking the beginning of the Estonian War of Independence. The small, poorly armed Estonian military, also known as the Peoples Force (Estonian: Rahvavägi), was initially pushed back by the Red Army into the vicinity of the capital city of Estonia - Tallinn. A mere 34 kilometers separated Tallinn and the front line. The Red Army were stopped, in part, because of the timely arrival of a shipment of arms brought by a British naval squadron.

In January 1919, the Estonian armed forces launched a counteroffensive, the May Offensive, under Commander-in-Chief Johan Laidoner. The Ground Forces were supported by the U.K. Royal Navy as well as Finnish, Swedish, and Danish volunteers. By the end of February 1919, the Red Army had been expelled from all of Estonia's territory. On 2 February 1920, the Peace Treaty of Tartu was signed by the Republic of Estonia and the Russian Soviet Federative Socialist Republic. After winning the Estonian Liberation War against the USSR and German Freikorps volunteers, Estonia maintained its independence for twenty-two years.

In August 1939, just prior to the start of World War II, Stalin and Hitler agreed to divide Eastern Europe into "spheres of special interest", as outlined by the Molotov–Ribbentrop Pact in its Secret Additional Protocol. According to this treaty, Estonia was to be occupied by the Soviet Union. The Estonian government decided to give their assent to an agreement which allowed the USSR to establish military bases and station 25,000 troops on Estonian soil for "mutual defence". On 12 June 1940, the order for a total military blockade of Estonia was given to the Soviet Baltic Fleet. Given the overwhelming Soviet force, in order to avoid the bloodshed of entering a futile and hopeless war, on 17 June 1940 the Estonian government decided not to resist. The military occupation of Estonia was complete by 21 June 1940. The armed forces of Estonia were disarmed in July 1940 by the Red Army according to Soviet orders. Only the Signal Battalion, stationed in Tallinn at Raua Street in front of the Tallinn School No. 21, continued to resist. As the Red Army brought in additional reinforcements supported by armoured fighting vehicles, the battle lasted several hours until sundown. In the end, there was one dead and several wounded on the Estonian side and about 10 killed and more wounded on the Soviet side. Military resistance ended with negotiations. Signal Battalion surrendered and was disarmed.

In the Second World War, many Estonians joined Nazi Germany's Wehrmacht auxiliary units, as well as eventually contributing volunteers and conscripts for the 20th Waffen Grenadier Division of the SS, which fought against the Allies' USSR.

The Estonian Defence Forces was restored on 3 September 1991, by the Supreme Council of the Republic of Estonia. Since its reformation in 1991, the armed forces of Estonia have re-opened and restored more than 30 old and new units, as well as several army branches.

Since 2011, the Commander of the Estonian Defence Forces has been appointed by and is responsible to the Government of Estonia through the Ministry of Defence, rather than to the Riigikogu, as it had been before. This was due to constitutional amendments proposed by then-President of Estonia, Toomas Hendrik Ilves.

Following the Russian invasion of Ukraine, the Estonian Division was formed in December 2022. On 30 July 2025 Minister of Defence Hanno Pevkur announced the investment of ten billion euros into the Defense Forces for 2026 through 2029. Under the plan, the Estonia Defense Force will create the country's first air defense brigade, alongside the creation of an artillery regiment, a military base in Narva, and defensive infrastructure under the Baltic Defence Line.

== Organization ==
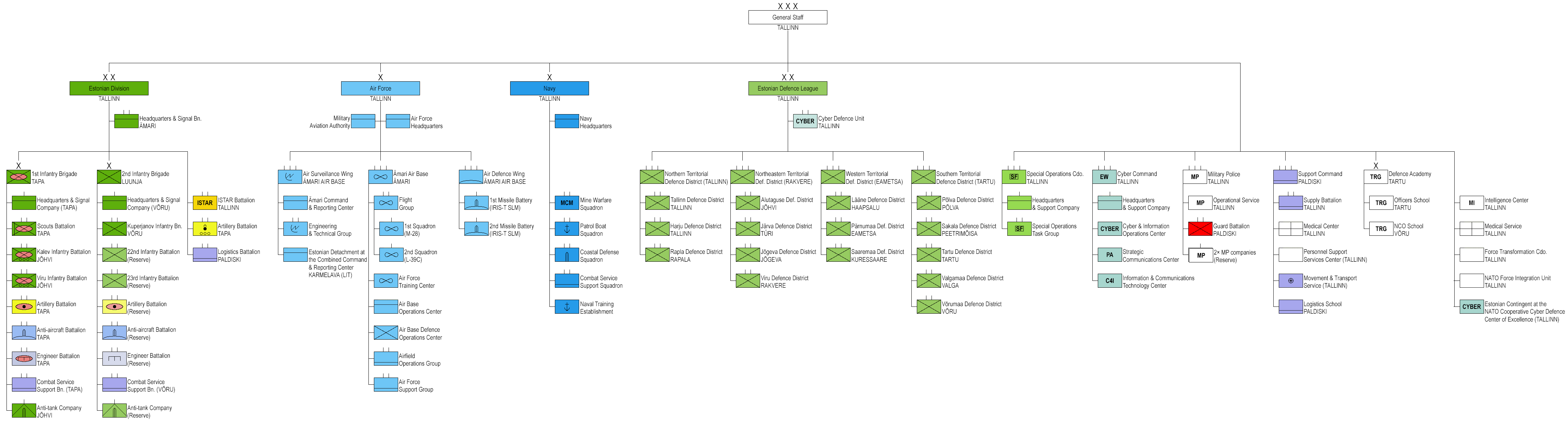
Estonian Defence Forces organization as of April 2026 (click to enlarge)

Other units of the Defence Forces:

- Future Capability and Innovation Command
- Cyber Command
- Support Command
  - Supply Battalion
- Military Police
  - Guard Battalion
- Estonian Special Operations Force

In peacetime, the main tasks of the EDF are to monitor and maintain control over territorial borders and airspace, maintain combat readiness, train conscripts, develop reserve units, participate in NATO and UN-led international missions, and to provide assistance to civilian authorities in case of a national emergency.

In crises, the main tasks of the EDF are to increase the readiness levels of units as required, prepare for transition to wartime structure and begin mobilization as ordered, integrate units from other ministries, and prepare for assistance from and reception of friendly forces.

In wartime, the main tasks of the EDF are to defend the territorial integrity of the state, to facilitate the arrival and deployment of forces from other countries and co-operate with them, to maintain control over national airspace, and to facilitate the air defence of strategic assets in co-operation with forces from other countries.

=== Leadership of the National Defence ===
The national defence of Estonia is conducted on the principles of civilian control, being inherently bound with the democratic organization of the state. Democratically elected and appointed executive institutions make decisions on the use of the defence forces, determine their respective objectives, allocate necessary resources, and monitor the attainment of the objectives. The implementation of the principles of civilian control is guaranteed by defence-related rights, obligations, and responsibilities legislated by parliament, the President, and the government of the republic. The highest leader of the national defence is the President, who is advised in national defence matters by the National Defence Council. The council is composed of the chairman of the Parliament, the Prime Minister, the Chief of the Defence Forces (Commander-in-Chief of the Defence Forces in wartime), the Defence Minister, the Minister of Internal Affairs, the Minister of Foreign Affairs, and the Chairman of the Parliamentary National Defence Committee. The federal government holds executive power in the leadership of the national defence.

=== Headquarters ===
In peacetime, the Estonian Defence Forces and the national defence organisations, including the Defence League, are led by the Commander of the Estonian Defence Forces. In wartime, all these components are commanded by the commander-in-chief of the defence forces. The Chief of the Defence Forces and the Commander-in-Chief of the Defence Forces are both appointed and released from office by the Ministry of Defence and the Cabinet on the proposal of the President of the Republic of Estonia.

The Headquarters of the Estonian Defence Forces is the headquarters of the military of Estonia, and acts as the working body of the Commander of the Estonian Defence Forces. The General Staff is a joint staff, engaged with operational leadership, training, and development of the defence forces. Operational leadership is implemented by the Operational Staff, which plans and controls operations, ensuring defence readiness and mobilisation. The departments for training and development are responsible for long-term and mid-term planning, resource planning, organisation, and control over the implementation of national defence activities. The General Staff of the Defence Forces is headed by the Chief of the Headquarters of the Estonian Defence Forces.

=== Land Forces ===
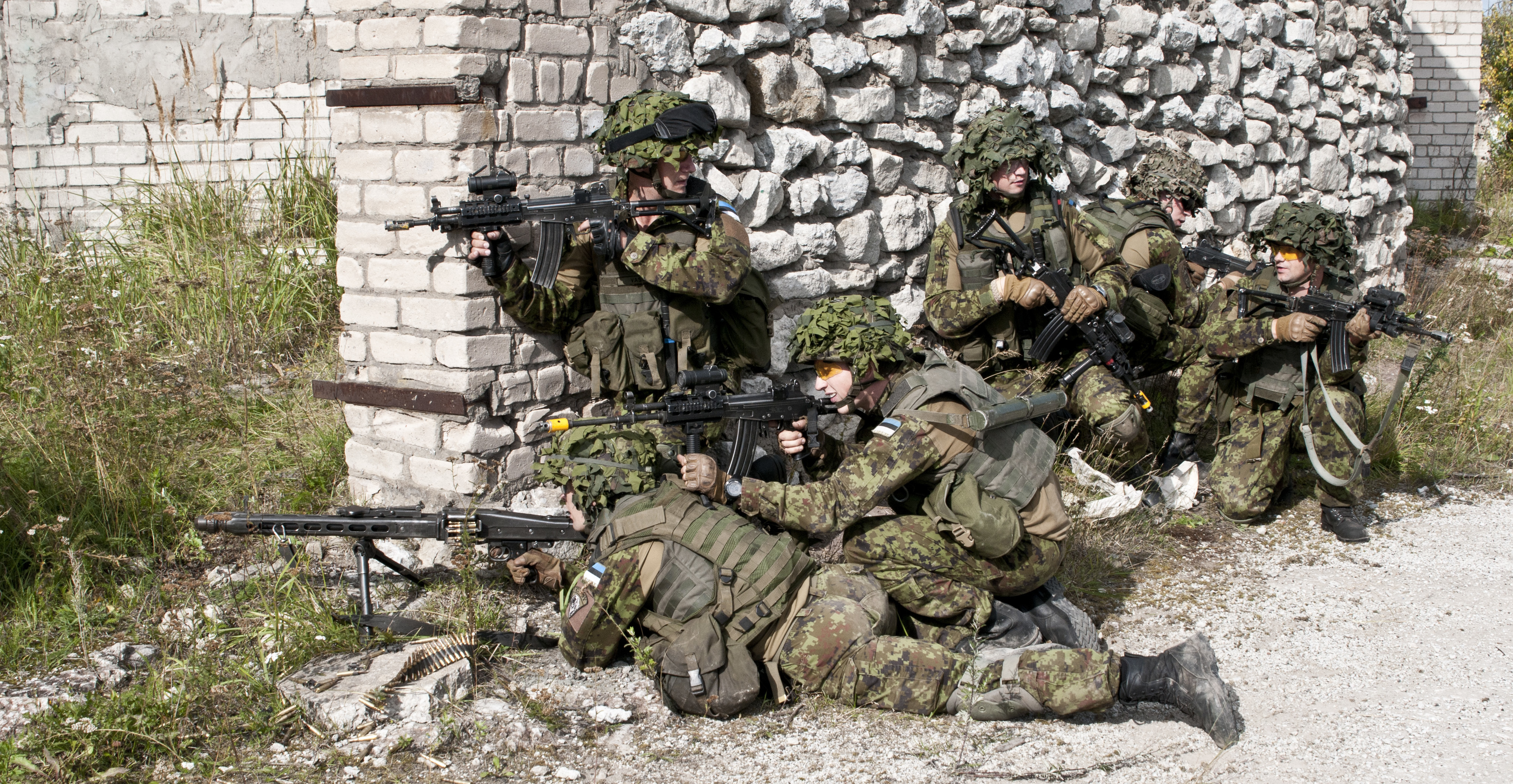
Estonian soldiers on exercise Operation Steadfast Javelin II 2014

The Estonian Land Forces (Estonian: Maavägi) is the main arm of the defence forces. The average size of the military formation in peacetime is about 6,700, about 3,200 of whom being conscripts. The Army component of the operational structure consists of the Estonian Division, which includes the 1st and 2nd Infantry Brigades, as well as an artillery battalion and support units.

Both infantry brigades act as training and support frames for deployable units. The Land Force's development priorities are the capability to participate in missions outside the national territory and the capability to perform operations to protect the territory of Estonia, also in co-operation with allied forces.

=== Navy ===
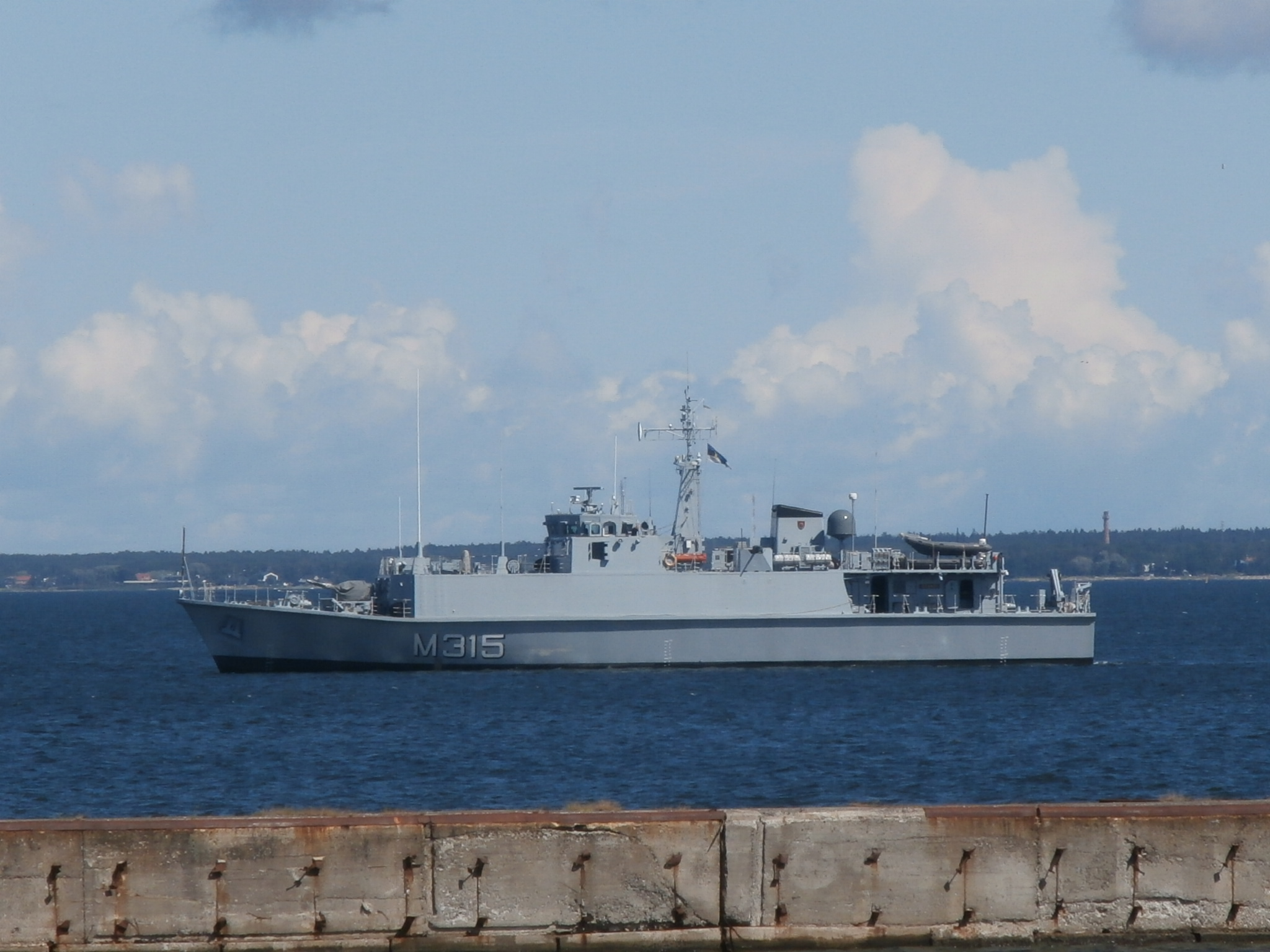
EML Ugandi at sea

The Estonian Navy (Estonian: Merevägi) is responsible for all naval operations and protecting of Estonia's territorial water. The main functions of the naval force are the defence of the territorial waters and coast line, ensuring maritime security, maintaining and managing communications and sea traffic, and co-operation with NATO and the navies of other friendly countries. In case of a crisis situation, the Merevägi must be ready to defend sea access points, harbour areas, maritime lines of communication, and to co-operate with coalition units. The Merevägi includes units of patrol ships, minesweepers, a frigate, and coast guard units. This equipment is necessary to ensure the security of maritime communications lines and to establish and clear mine barriers. The majority of the naval forces are situated at the Miinisadam Naval Base. Its current structure operates the Mineships Division which also includes a diving group. In addition, there is the Naval Academy and the Naval Headquarters which are situated in Tallinn. Since 1995, numerous mine clearance operations have been carried out in Estonian waters in close co-operation with other navies of the Baltic region in order to find and dispose ordnances and contribute to safe seagoing. In 2007 the Merevägi mineships fleet was modernized and equipped with Sandown class minehunters. In 2010, in accordance with the long-term defence development plan, it was announced that the Merevägi will receive some new capabilities. Of those new warfare capabilities, the procurement of multirole fast patrol boats was the priority. The benefits of the vehicles to operations are the increased defence of territorial waters and improvement of maritime surveillance. In addition to the current capabilities, the command and control and shore-to-vessel communications were also to be improved further.

=== Air Force ===
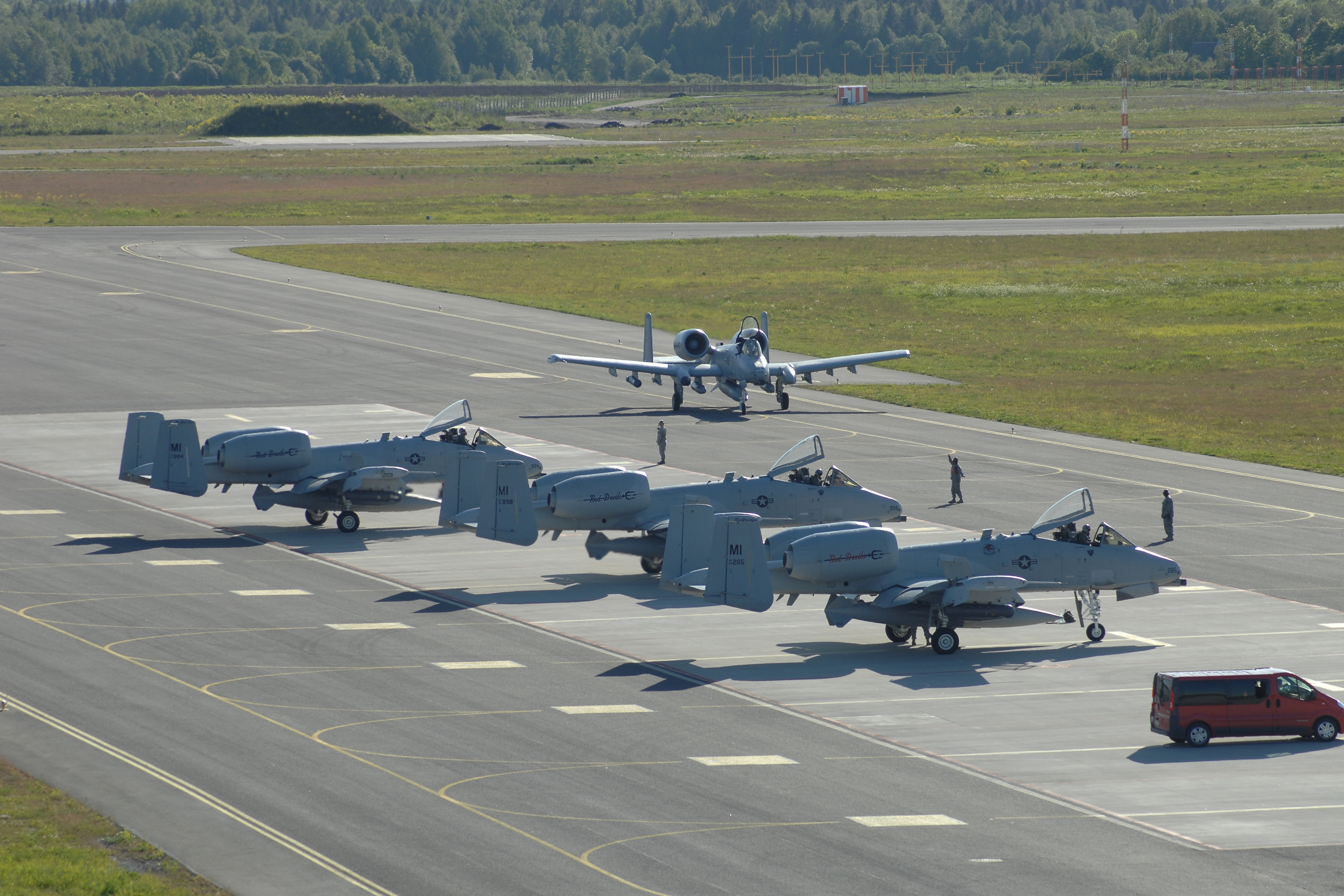
A-10 ground attack aircraft from Michigan Air National Guard at Ämari Air Base

The Estonian Air Force (Estonian: Õhuvägi) is the main arm of the Estonian aviation forces. The roots of the current organization date back to 1918, when August Roos organized the first Estonian aviation unit. The Independence War gave great impetus to the development of the Estonian Air Force, which had, by the middle of the 1930s, more than 130 modern aircraft. The organization consisted of the Naval Aviation Group, Flight School, Air Base, and Air Defence Artillery Group. Estonian engineers designed and constructed the fighter aircraft, which displayed outstanding performance. The Estonian Air Force was re-established in 1991, with the objectives of controlling Estonian airspace and the air defence of strategic objects.

The Estonian Air Force was slow to reform due to the severely damaged infrastructure left behind by the Soviet Air Force and air defence units. The Estonian Air Force was restored on 13 April 1994. From 1993 to 1995, Estonia received two Let L-410 UVP transport aircraft, three Mil Mi-2, and four Mil Mi-8 helicopters. The service branch received old Soviet radar and AAA equipment.

The majority of Estonian Air Force units are currently stationed at the Ämari Air Base, where renovation was completed in 2012. The airfield and garrison at Ämari are focused on preparing for and facilitating cooperation with NATO and allied air forces. It enables the supply of standardized airfield and aircraft services necessary for host nation support.

=== Estonian Special Operations Force ===
Estonian Special Operations Force (ESTSOF) is the special operations command of the Estonian Defence Forces. Its tasks include special reconnaissance and surveillance, military support, and direct action. The primary objective of the Special Operations Force is the development of capabilities for unconventional warfare.

=== Military Police of the Estonian Defence Forces ===
The Military Police of the Estonian Defence Forces is the military police unit of the Estonian Defence Forces. The tasks of the military police include: investigation of serious disciplinary cases and some armed service- related crimes, supervision of military discipline within the Forces, military traffic control and various security tasks. The MP reserves are regularly trained in Guard Battalion, which also conducts ceremonial duties.

=== Cyber Command ===
The Estonian Defence Forces Cyber Command is responsible for conducting cyber operations that support the Ministry of Defence's area of responsibility. Its tasks include ensuring the operation of IT services and conducting defensive and offensive cyberwarfare. It consists of the Headquarters Support and Signal Battalion, the Information and Communication Technology Center, and the Cyber Information Operations Center and Strategic Communications Center.

==== Cyber security ====
The Military of Estonia has been introducing new 21st century based cyber warfare and defence formations in order to protect the vital infrastructure and e-infrastructure of Estonia. One of the leading state organizations in Estonian cyber defence is the CERT (the Computer Emergency Response Team of Estonia), established in 2006, responsible for responding to security incidents in .ee computer networks. Its task is to assist Estonian internet users in the implementation of preventive measures, in order to reduce possible damage from security incidents, and to help them in responding to security threats. The unit deals with security incidents that occur in Estonian networks, are started there, or which they have been notified of by citizens or institutions in Estonia or abroad. On 25 June 2007, Estonian president Toomas Hendrik Ilves met with the president of United States, George W. Bush. Among the topics discussed were the attacks on Estonian e-infrastructure. The attacks triggered a number of military organisations around the world to reconsider the importance of network security in modern military doctrine. On 14 June 2007, defence ministers of NATO members held a meeting in Brussels, issuing a joint communiqué promising immediate action. The first public results were estimated to arrive by the autumn 2007. In the aftermath of the Cyberattacks on Estonia in 2007, plans to combine network defence with Estonian military doctrine, and related NATO plans to create a Cybernetic Defence Centre in Estonia, were nicknamed the "Tiger's Defence" (Estonian: Tiigrikaitse), in reference to Tiigrihüpe.

=== Territorial Defence ===
The Territorial Defence is a reserve force, which is based on the Estonian Defence League- a voluntary military organisation- which acts in the area of responsibility of the Ministry of Defence. It consists of four territorial districts. It is tasked with planning and conducting military operations with the units under its command.

The Defence League possesses arms and engages in military exercises. The main goal of the Defence League is, on the basis of the citizens' free will and initiative, to enhance the readiness of the nation to defend its independence and constitutional order, including in the event of military threat. It plays an important role in supporting the civil structures. Its members aid in putting out wildfires, volunteer as assistant police members, and ensure safety at various public events. Units, consisting of voluntary members of the Defence League, also participate in international peace support operations such as in the Balkan states. The Defence League and its affiliated organizations have positive relations with partner organizations in the Nordic countries, the United States, and the United Kingdom.

== Personnel ==
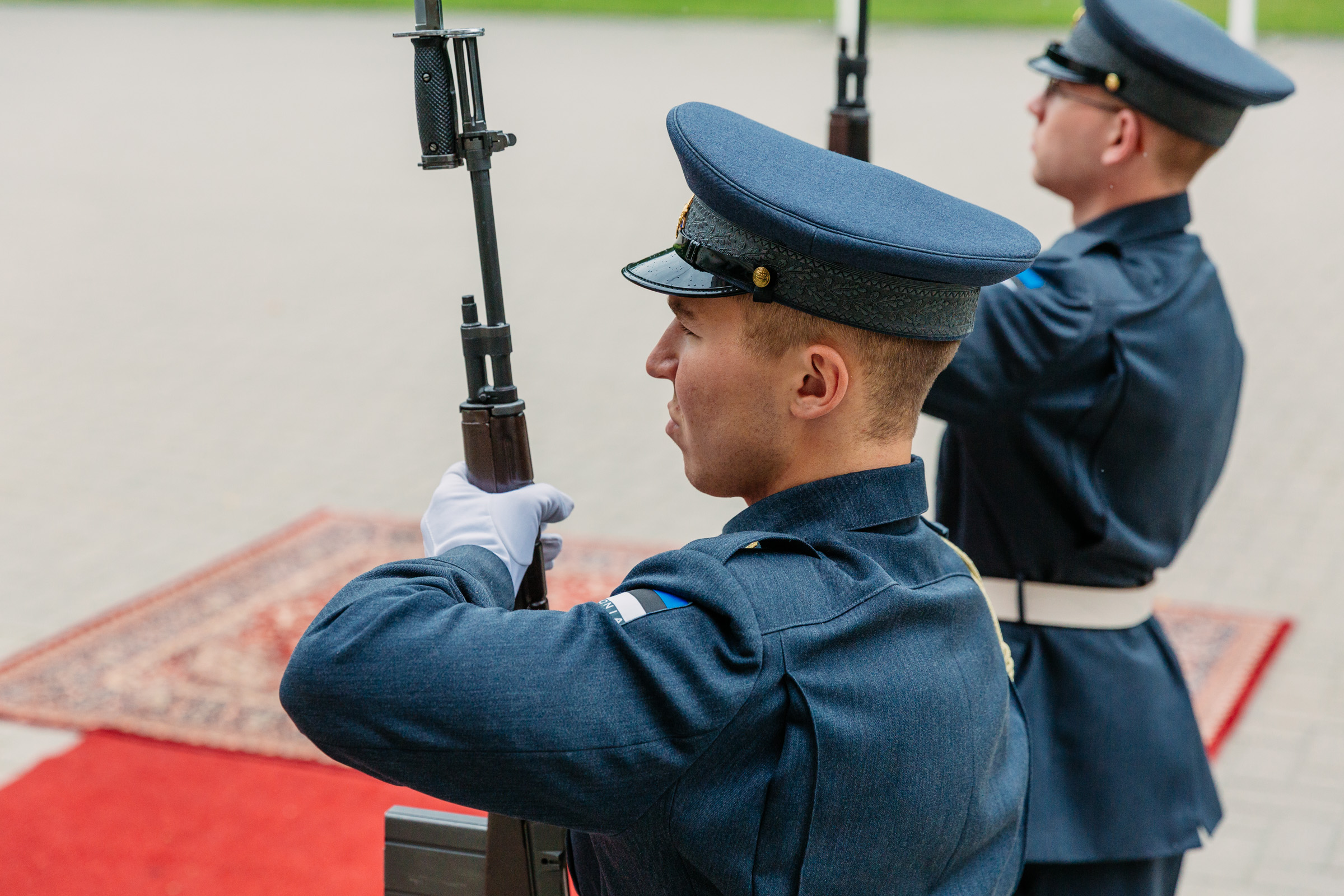
An Estonian soldier presenting arms

The Defence Forces consist of basic military units totaling 6,500 officers and conscripts. The planned operational wartime size as of 2017 was 21,000 personnel, which is to be increased to over 24,400 by 2026. The Estonian Army is structured according to the principle of a reserve forces, which means that the majority of state defence forces are reserve units.

In peacetime, the reservists conduct periodic training, and the state purchases equipment and weapons. In wartime the reservists are mobilized into military units. The reserve units are formed on the territorial principle, (i.e. conscripts from one area are called into a singular unit) and after service are sent to the reserve as one unit. The Estonian Army is always in a state of constant defence readiness in co-operation with the other services.

=== Conscription ===
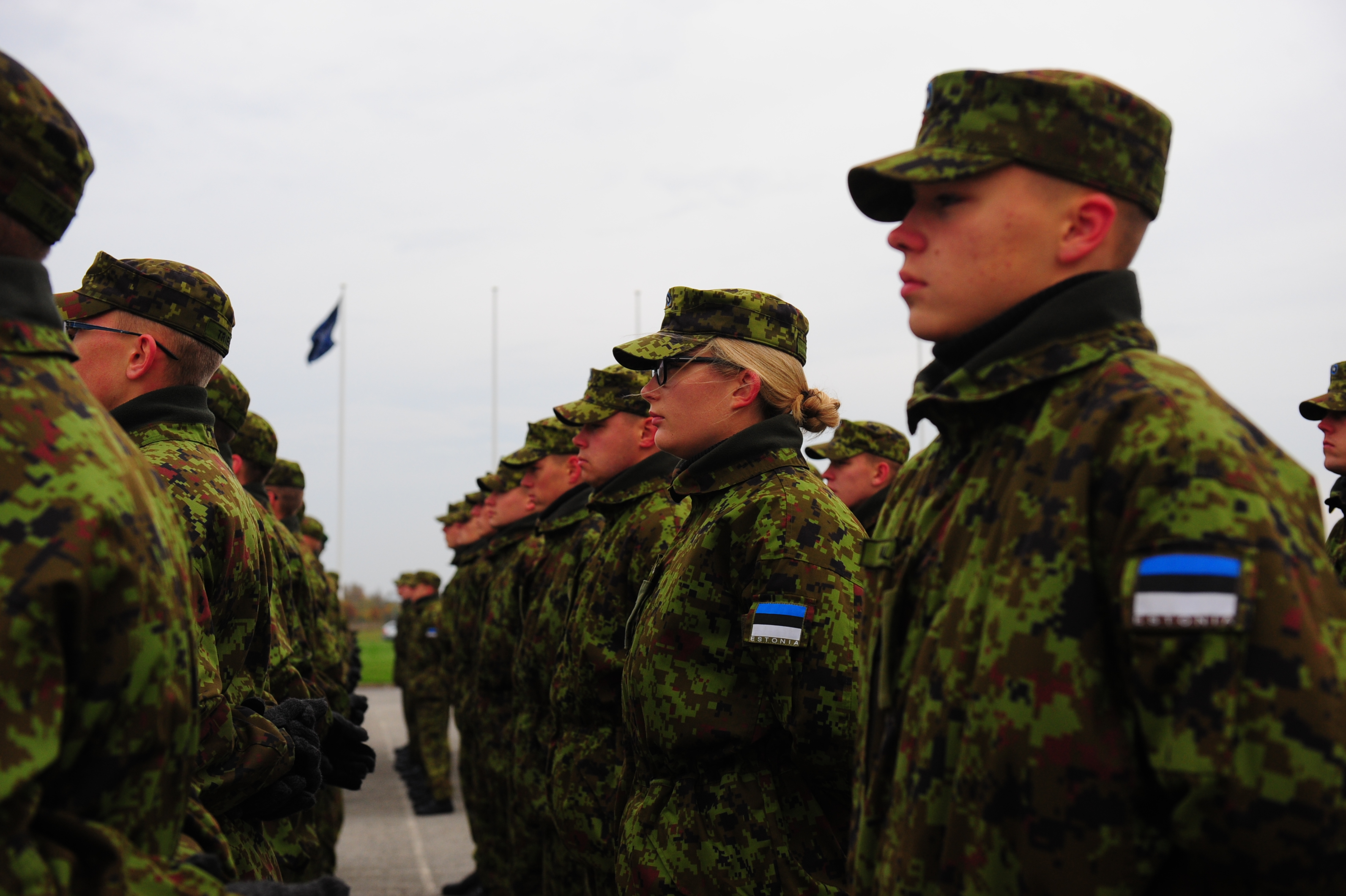
Estonian conscripts in formation

Estonia instituted compulsory military service in late 1991. Up to 4,100 conscripts, including a small number of women, enter military units of the Estonian Defence Forces every year. The service is 11 months long for those trained as junior NCOs, drivers, military policemen and specialists. Other soldiers serve 8 months. Conscripts are serving in infantry, artillery, air defence, engineering, communications, naval, and combat service support units as well as antitank, recce, mortar, and military police subunits. In 2023, the Estonian Minister of Defence proposed extending the maximum term of compulsory service to 12 months for certain specialties.

According to the National Defence Development Plan, the annual number of conscripts should reach 4,000 by 2022 after a revision of medical and physical requirements. Increasing the number of soldiers would require more barracks, weapons and other infrastructure.

== Equipment ==
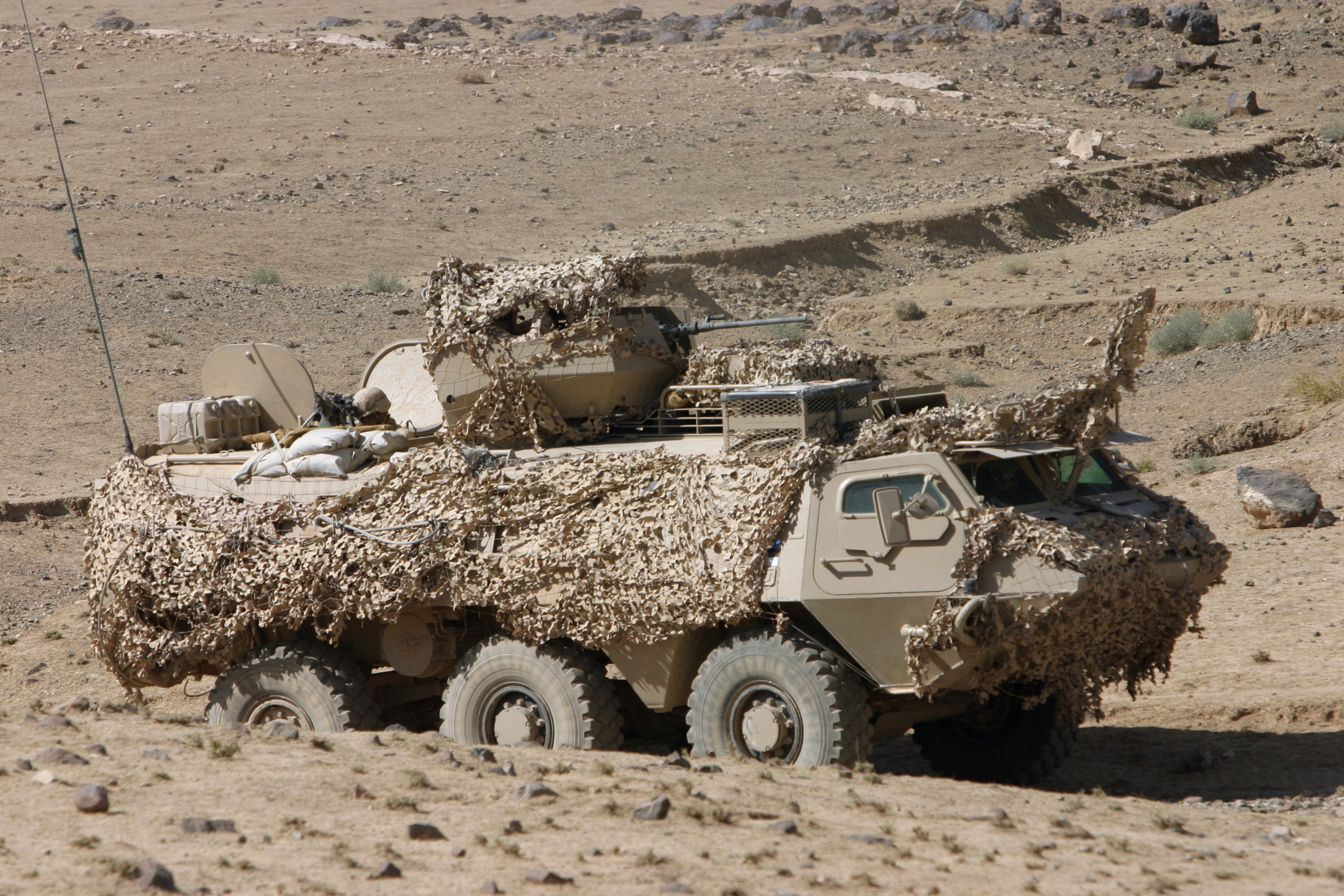
Patria XA-180

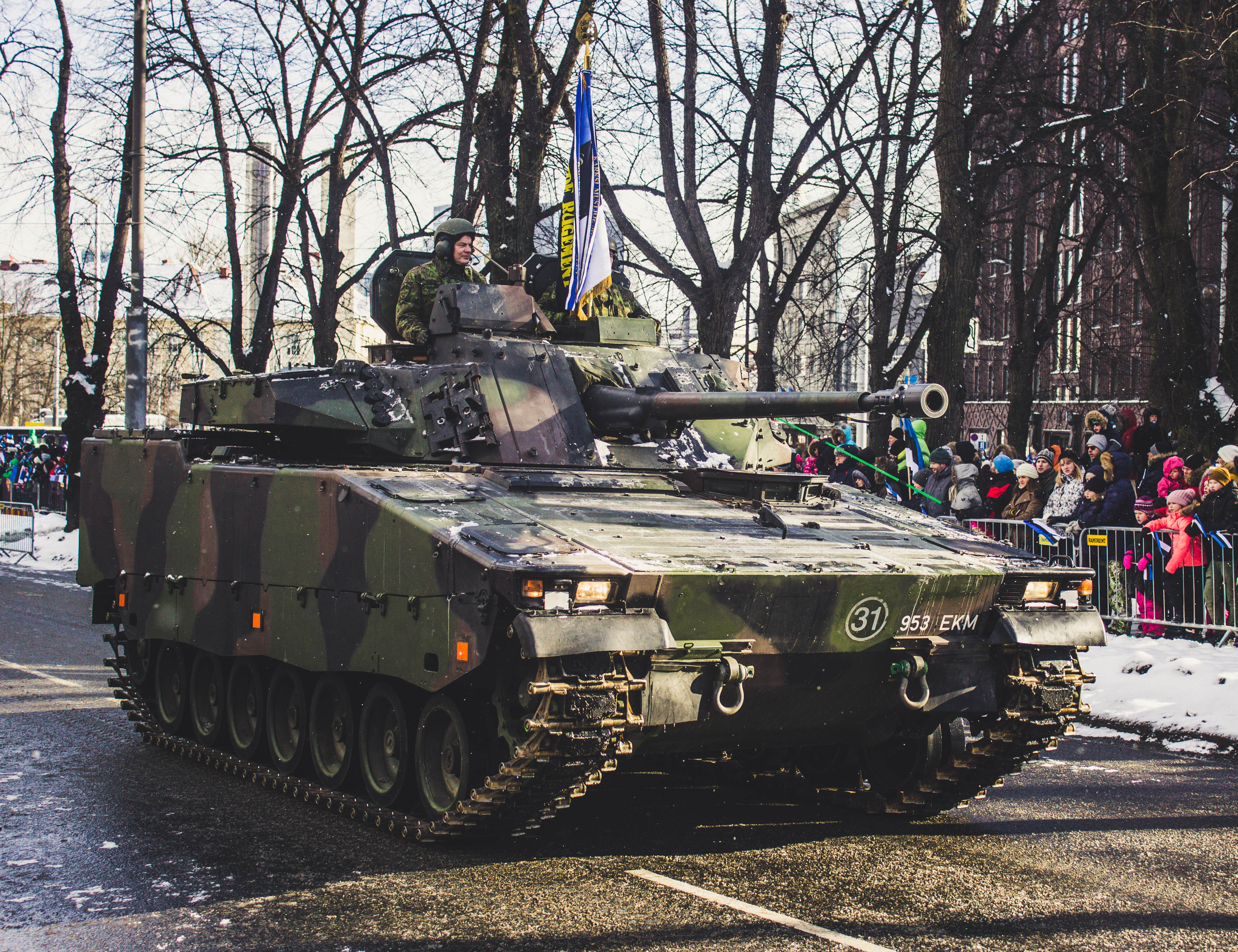
CV90

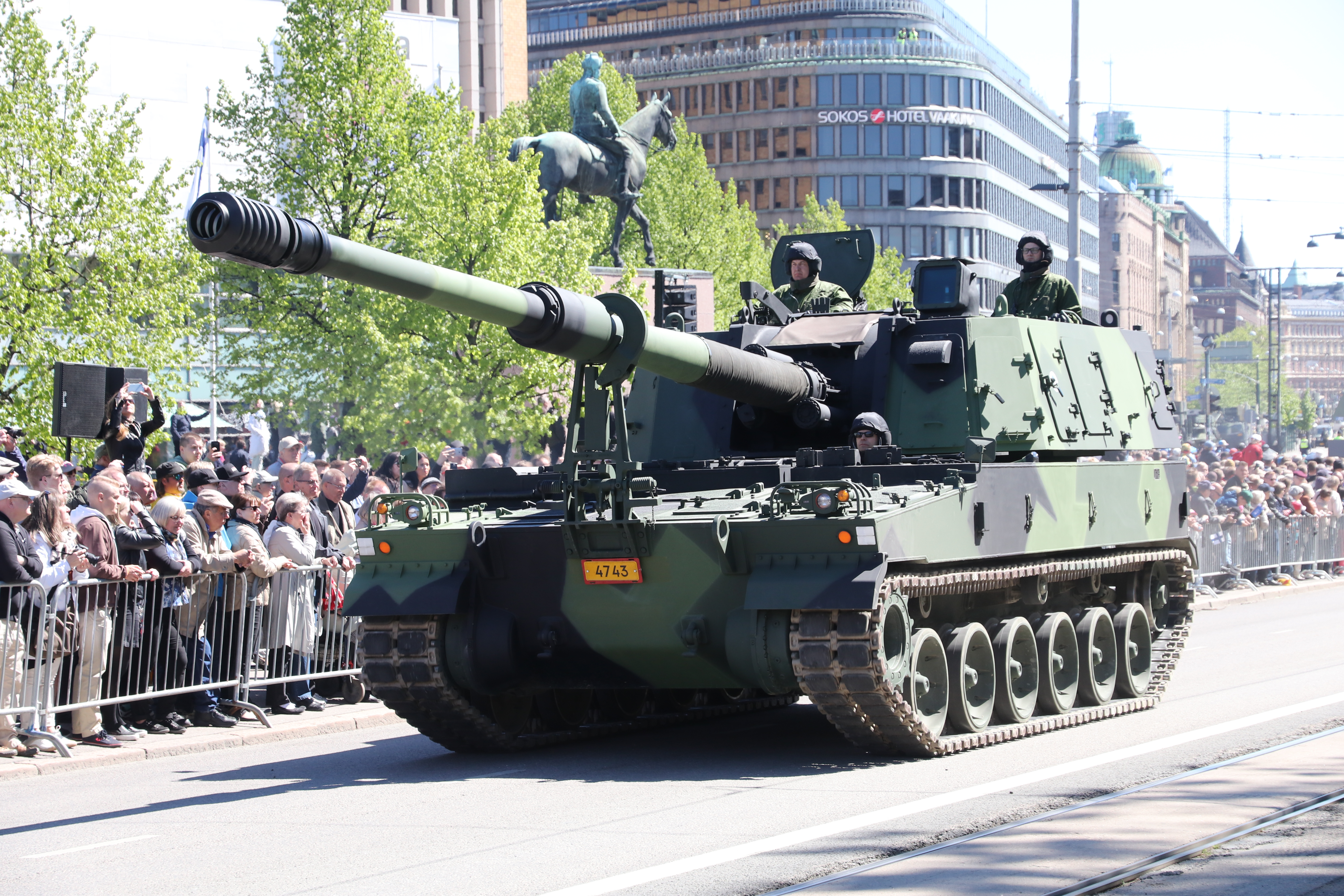
K9 Thunder

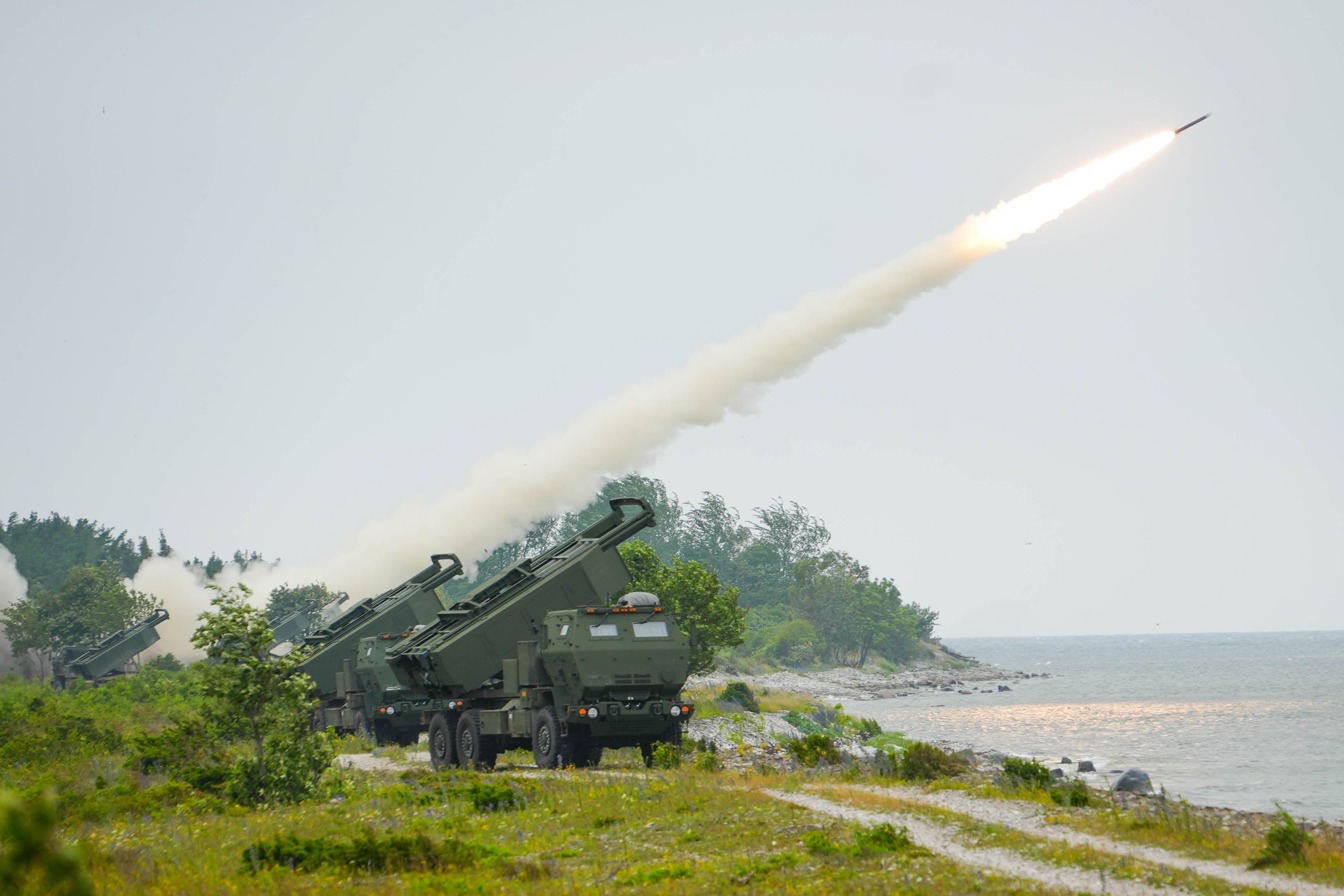
M142 HIMARS

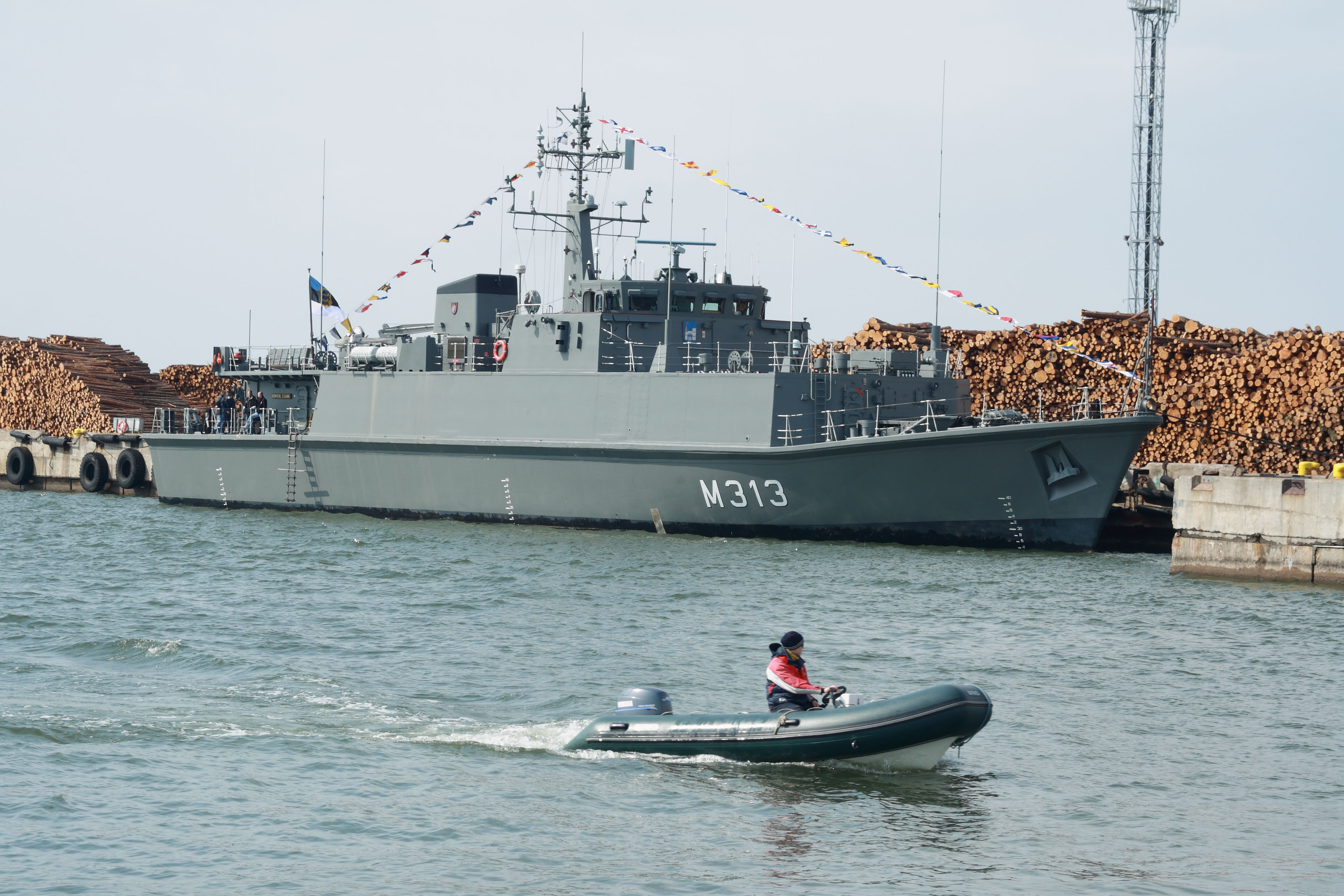
EML Admiral Cowan

== Operations ==
=== International cooperation ===
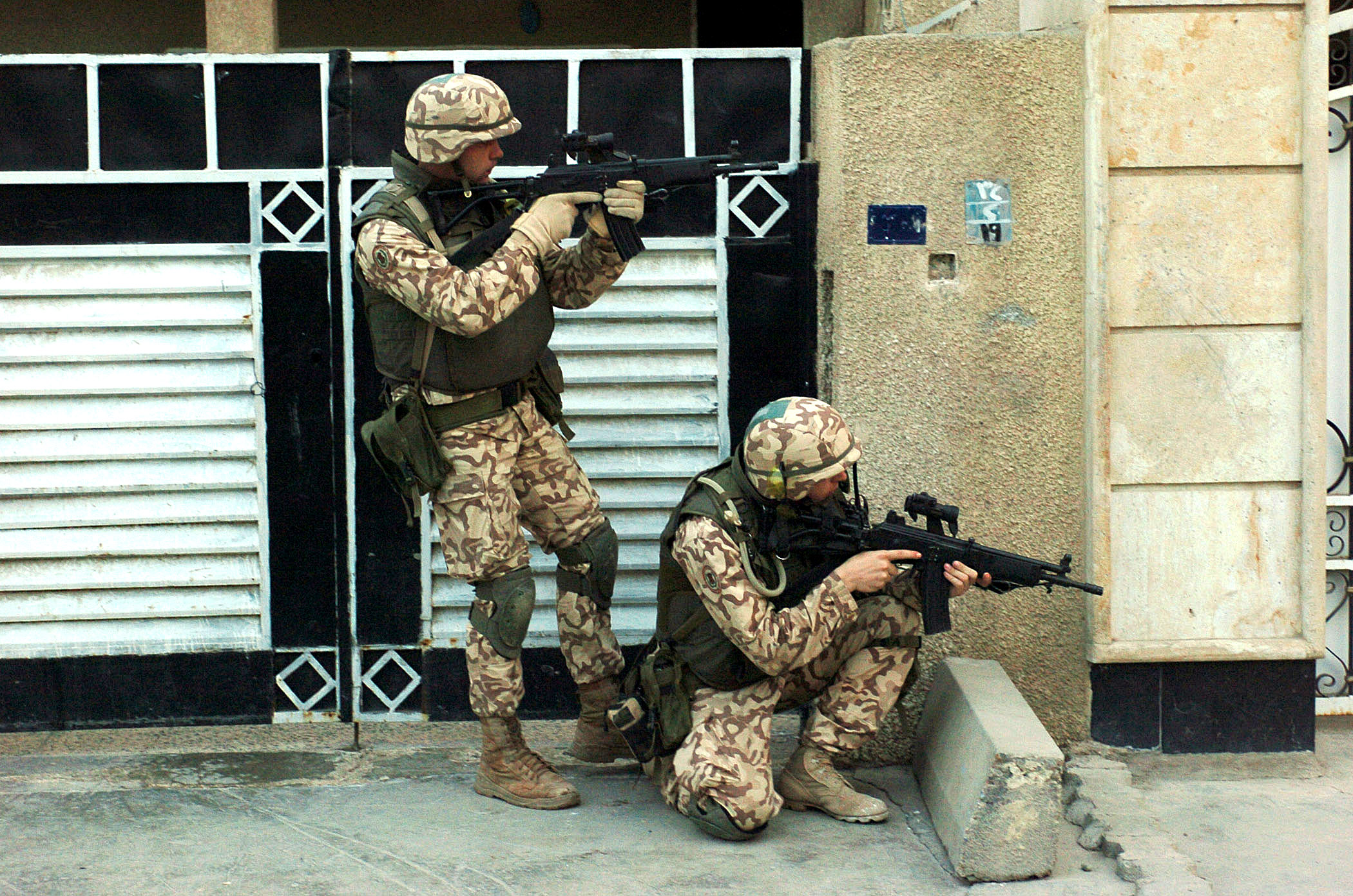
Estonian soldiers in Iraq armed with IMI Galil rifles (2005)

Since 2004, Estonia has been a full member of NATO; membership had become one of its foremost priorities after the restoration of independence. The United States is among the countries with which Estonia has very close cooperation in the defence and security fields. Currently, Estonia participates in the NATO Response Force and contributes to the NTM-I (NATO Training Mission - Iraq). Until 2009, Estonia had 40 soldiers fighting alongside American Forces in the Iraq War and 150 soldiers, or about 3% of its total active military force, fighting alongside British Forces during the War in Afghanistan. Estonian forces have since been withdrawn from Iraq. In both cases, the units were regularly rotated. Estonia also provides peacekeepers for international missions in both Bosnia and Kosovo within the framework of the KFOR, contributes to EU battlegroups and NATO Response Force rotations, and participates in the EU's anti-piracy operations off the coast of Somalia. The Estonian military employs STANAG (NATO interoperable) weapons and equipment acquired from Finland, Sweden, Germany, Denmark, Great Britain, the United States and Israel.

== Military industry ==
Estonia has been developing its military industry since the Russian invasion of Ukraine. Among the development projects is the establishment of 3 defence industry parks in Ida-Viru County (Põhja-Kiviõli), Ämari, and Pärnu (a.k.a. Tõstamaa or Ermistu). In Ämari, the Estonian company Nitrotol has started the production of military explosives and mines. Nitrotol is also planning to expand their production by also building a plant at the Pärnu park. Frankenburg Technologies is planning to manufacture air defence missiles en masse in Pärnu park. Infinitum Strike is planning missile booster (solid rocket) production at Pärnu, and Thor Industries Ltd, from UK, is to produce plastic explosives in Pärnu. The South Korean company Hanwha Aerospace is investing about €100 million in Estonian defence industry as part of the Estonian order of K9 howitzers and Chunmoo artillery missile systems from Hanwha. One receiver of investment from Hanwha is a project to establish 40mm ammunition production unit in Estonia. Another investment target is the establishment of a maintenance facility for Hanwha's K9 and Chunmoo weapons systems in Estonia. Turkish company ARCA Defense plans to start producing artillery and mortar shells and artillery rockets (155mm shells, mortar bombs of various sizes, and 122mm rockets) in Ida-Viru County at the Põhja-Kiviõli Defense Industrial Park. The investment in ammunition production facility is valued at about 300 million euros with production scheduled to begin in 2028.

Also, Estonian Baltic Workboats (BWB) in Saaremaa is building (as of 2025) a new kind of semi-autonomous warship.

The Estonian company Milrem Robotics builds unmanned ground vehicles (UGVs).

== See also ==
- Military of Latvia
- Military of Lithuania
- Military of Poland
- Defence Force

== Bibliography ==
- International Institute for Strategic Studies (2022). The Military Balance 2022. Routledge. ISBN 978-1-032-27900-8.
