= Viktor Kalnitski =

Estonian army officer (born 1975)

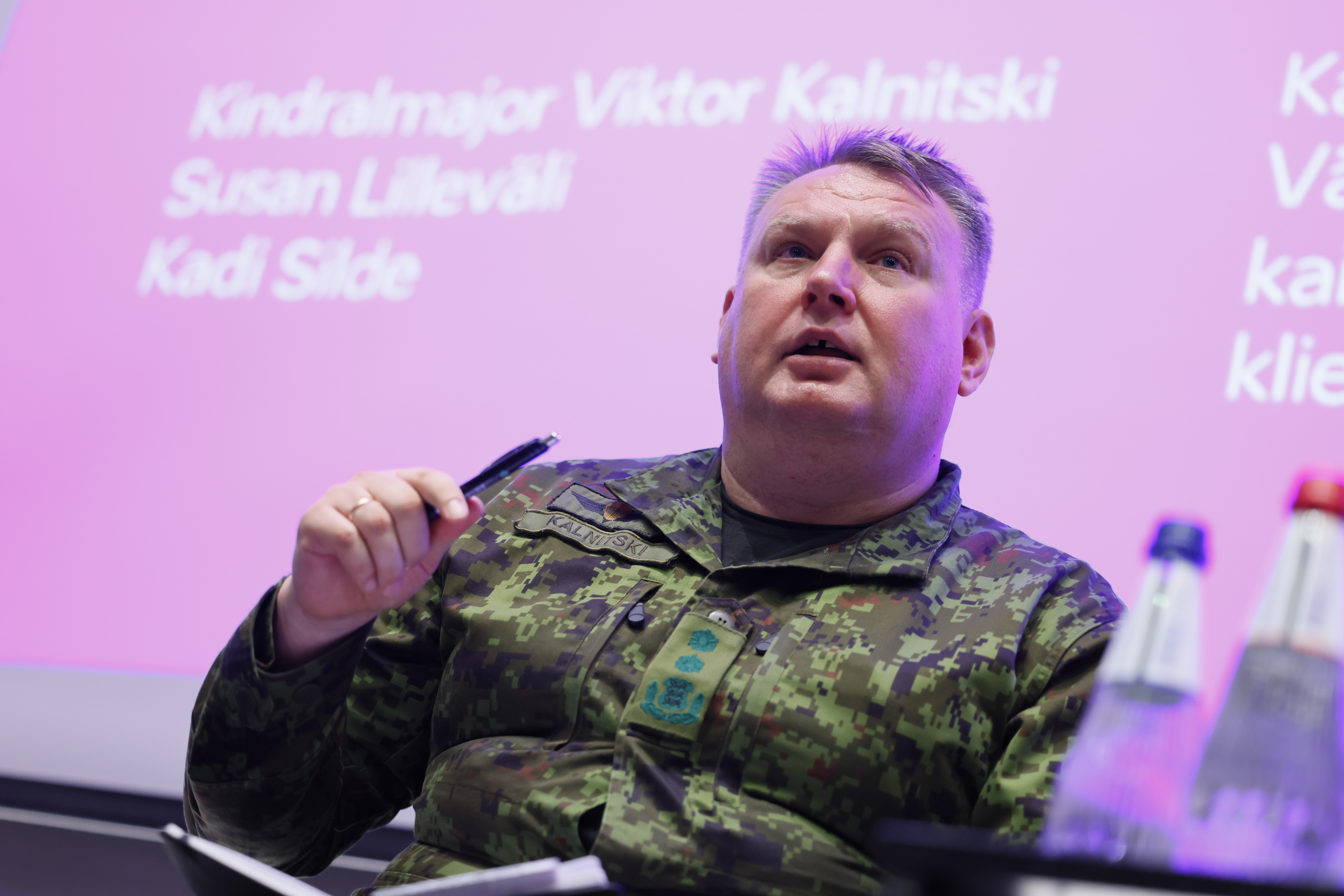

Deputy Commander of the Estonian Defence Forces
- Incumbent
- Assumed office 1 September 2025
- President: Alar Karis
- Commander: Andrus Merilo
- Preceded by: Rauno Sirk

Personal details
- Born: 1 February 1975 (age 51) Tallinn, then part of Estonian SSR, Soviet Union

Military service
- Allegiance: Estonia
- Branch/service: Estonian Land Forces
- Years of service: 1994–present
- Rank: Major general
- Commands: Estonian Military Academy

Major General Viktor Kalnitski (born 1 February 1975) is an Estonian general who is the current Deputy Commander of the Estonian Defence Forces.

== Early life and education ==
Viktor Kalnitski was born on 1 February 1975, in the city of Tallinn, then part of the Estonian Soviet Socialist Republic. He is an ethnic Russian. After completing his military service, he completed the infantry senior noncommissioned officer course at the Estonian Defence Forces Battle College in 1994. In 1995, he completed the infantry officer course at the Finnish Reserve Officers' School. From 1998 to 2002, he studied at the Finnish National Defence University (MPKK), where he specialized in artillery and graduated with a master's degree. From 2008 to 2009, he completed the Senior Staff Officers Course at the MPKK and in 2019, he graduated from the General Staff Officers' Course.

== Military service ==
Kalnitski began his military service in 1994 as a conscript in the Northern Single Infantry Company, where he also served as a platoon leader and platoon commander after completing the senior noncommissioned officer course. From 1996 to 1998, he served as the commander of the reconnaissance group of the Guard Battalion. In 2002, he continued his service in the Artillery Regiment, Estonian Division, where he served as a battery commander and battalion commander of the 2nd Battery. In 2007, he was assigned to the G35 Department of the Army Headquarters, where he served first as a staff officer and then as an artillery inspector. From 2013 to 2016, he served as a policy staff officer at Headquarters, Multinational Corps Northeast. In 2016, he served for one year as the Chief of the Operations Department in the General Staff of the Estonian Defence League, and then for two years as the Commander of the Northeastern Territorial Defence Region. He has served three deployments to Afghanistan, including the International Security Assistance Force and the Resolute Support Mission. In 2008, he served as the National Contingent Fire Support Officer in Helmand Province and from 2010 to 2011 as the National Contingent Commander. In 2014–2015, he served as the Staff Officer at ISAF and Resolute Support Headquarters in Afghanistan.

He has also served as the Chief of Staff and Commander of the Viru District and the Northeastern Regional Defense District of the EDF, and headed both the Personnel Department and the Training Department of the General Staff of the Estonian Defence Forces. On June 19, 2024, Viktor Kalnitski was promoted to Brigadier General. One day later, he was appointed as the Commander of the Estonian Military Academy. Since 1 September 2025, he has been Deputy Commander of the Estonian Defence Forces. As part of the Estonian Independence Day celebrations, he was promoted to Major General on February 23, 2026.

== Effective dates of promotion ==
Promotions
Insignia	Rank	Date
	Brigadier General	18 June 2024
	Major General	23 February 2026

== Personal life ==
Kalnitski is married to Jelena and they have an adult son, Aleksandr. In addition to Estonian, he speaks English, Russian, and Finnish. He also has basic knowledge of Polish and Ukrainian.
