= National Defence Council (Estonia) =

The National Defense Council (Estonian: Riigikaitsenõukogu) is a consultative body of the Government of Estonia on matters of national security, foreign policy, and defence strategy.

== Composition ==
The chair is Kristen Michal (Prime Minister of Estonia). Statuary members are:

- President of the Riigikogu
- Chairman of the Riigikogu National Defence Committee
- Chairman of the Riigikogu Foreign Affairs Committee
- Minister of Foreign Affairs
- Minister of Defence
- Minister of Finance
- Minister of the Interior
- Minister of Justice
- Minister of Economic Affairs and Infrastructure
- Commander of the Estonian Defence Forces

The President may appoint additional participants when appropriate.
