= Support Command (Estonia) =

- Active: c. 1918 (as Varustusvalitsus); 2002–2014 (as Logistics Centre); 2014–present (as Support Command)
- Country: Estonia
- Type: Military logistics service
- Role: Supply and transportation Vehicle maintenance Medical support
- Part of: Estonian Defence Forces
- Garrison/HQ: Paldiski garrison
- Anniversaries: Formed: 21 November 1918; Restored: 22 May 2002
- Engagements: Estonian War of Independence

Commanders
- Current commander: Colonel Erki Soo
- Command Sergeant Major: Sergeant Major Hanno Pärnaste
- Notable commanders: Rudolf Reimann

The Support Command, formerly the Logistics Centre of the Estonian Defence Forces until 2014, is the military logistics branch of the Estonian Defence Forces.

The unit is under joint command of the defence forces, meaning it supports every combat arm, acts as a "fourth branch" to the Estonian Land Forces, Navy, and Air Force.

== History ==
=== Estonian War of Independence ===
The Varustusvalitsus (supply administration) was founded in November 1918, by then–colonel Rudolf Reimann, an experienced Estonian army quartermaster.

During the Estonian War of Independence, the unit was responsible for standardizing service requests and inventory reports.

By 1919, the Varustusvalitsus was also responsible for the upkeep, repair, and distribution of captured German weaponry and vehicles from occupation forces and the Baltic Landwehr. Clothing, winter equipment, and footwear, all of which were in short supply, were also procured from German stashes.

Throughout the war, the Varustusvalitsus also operated its own workshops and shoe factories. Employees of these posts worked 24–hour shifts, and dealt with consistent and demanding quotas. One night, 200 pairs of boots were requested for a frontline unit, to be delivered by the next day. At the time, it took one shoemaker 1.5 days to produce a single pair.

In addition to uniform items and shoes, revolvers, rifles, cannons, firewood, sugar, salt, meat, vegetables, and other various items were frequently procured and delivered to frontline units.

=== Later history ===
Presumably disbanded after the war, the service was reactivated in 2002 as the Logistics Centre of the Estonian Defence Force. In 2014, it was renamed to the Support Command.

== List of commanders ==
- Colonel Rudolf Reimann (1918–1920)
- Major general Tõnis Rotberg (1920–1938)
- Colonel Johannes Martins (1938–1940)
- Lieutenant Raivo Ott (2002–2004)
- Lieutenant Ilmar Lepik (2004–2005)
- Major Paul Vaha (2005–2007)
- Captain Rudolf Jeeser (2007–2009)
- Colonel German Kesa (2009–2012)
- Lieutenant colonel Kalev Koidumäe (2012–2016)
- Captain lieutenant Roman Lukas (2016–2017)
- Colonel Toomas Susi (2017–2022)
- Colonel Taivo Rõkk (2022–2023
- Lieutenant colonel Valdo Veski (2023–2024)
- Colonel Erki Soo (2024–present)

== Organization ==
As of 2026, the Support Command was led by Colonel Erki Soo and Sergeant Major Hanno Pärnaste, and composed of the following units:

Headquarters

- Logistics School
- Movement and Transport Service
- Supply Battalion
- Personnel Support Services Centre
- Medical Centre

=== Supply Battalion ===
Of all the units of the Support Command, the Supply Battalion is the only one that receives conscripts. The battalion offers occupational specialties including tow truck driver, mechanic, forklift operator, and inventory manager.

=== Medical Centre ===
The Medical Centre is the primary source of paramedics and doctors for the Estonian Defence Force, and is comparatively larger in structure than other units in the Support Command. It includes a dentistry centre, an operating room (OR), and a centralized pharmacy, as well as military health facilities in Paldiski, Tallinn, Ämari Air Base, and Miinisadam Naval Base.
