= Frankenburg Technologies =

Frankenburg Technologies is a defence technology startup from Estonia, founded in 2024, that develops missiles to intercept drones – Mark I and Mark II. In March 2026, the company signed an agreement with PGZ to build an anti-drone defence plant in Poland.
