= Lake Klooga =

Lake in Estonia

- Klooga järv (Estonian)
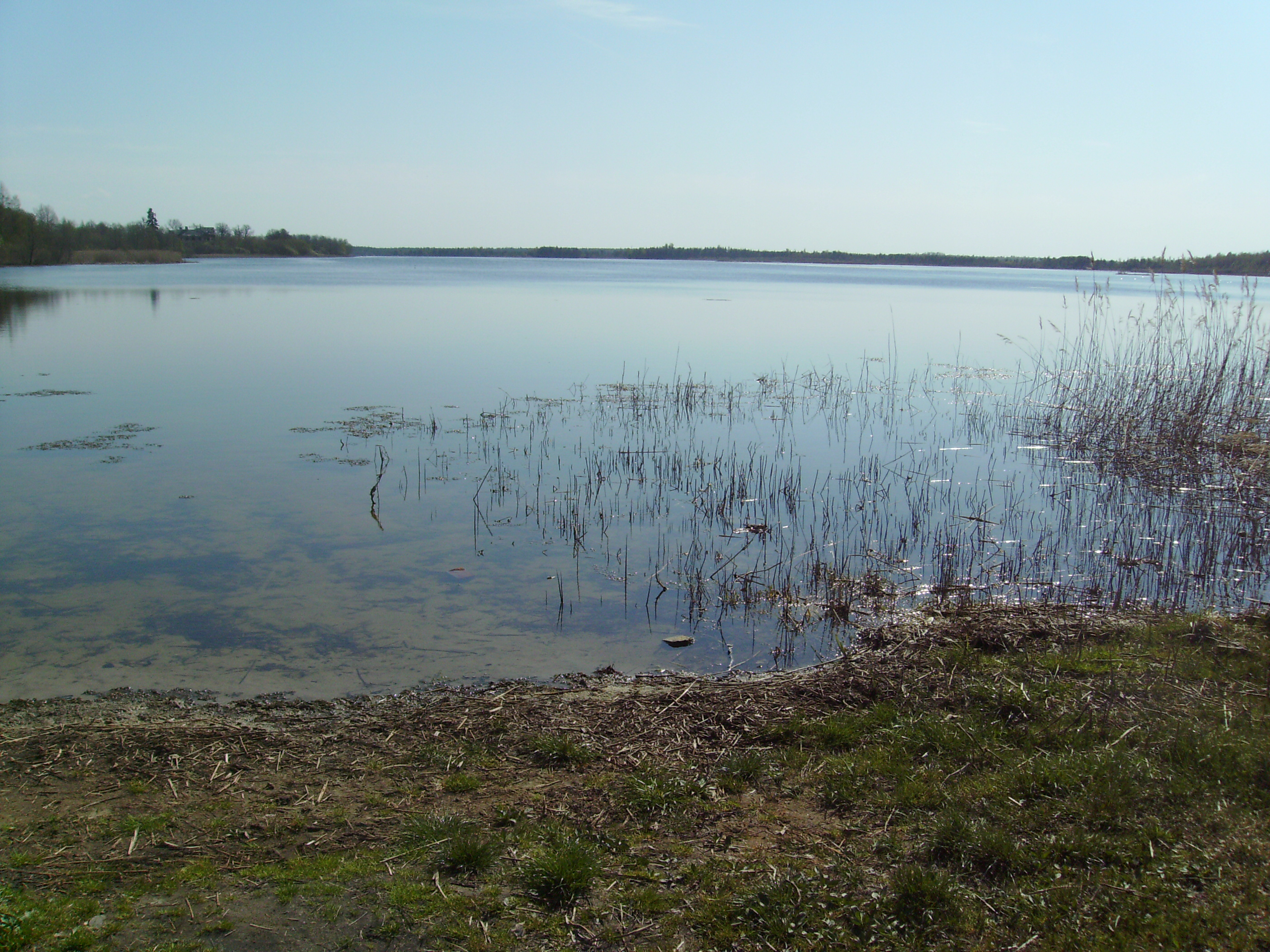

- Location within Estonia
- Location: Lääne-Harju Parish, Harju County, Estonia
- Coordinates: 59°18′30″N 24°14′10″E
- Basin countries: Estonia
- Max. length: 2,970 meters (9,740 ft)
- Max. width: 800 meters (2,600 ft)
- Surface area: 133.2 hectares (329 acres)
- Average depth: 0.8 meters (2 ft 7 in)
- Max. depth: 3.3 meters (11 ft)
- Water volume: 1,079,000 cubic meters (38,100,000 cu ft)
- Shore length^{1}: 8,270 meters (27,130 ft)
- Surface elevation: 11.8 meters (39 ft)
- Islands: 3
- ^{1} Shore length is not a well-defined measure.

Lake Klooga (Estonian: Klooga järv, also Lodijärv) is a shallow drainage lake in northern Estonia. It is located in the settlement of Klooga in Lääne-Harju Parish in Harju County.

== Physical description ==
The lake has an area of 133.2 hectares (329 acres), and it has three islands with a combined area of 0.2 hectares (0.49 acres). The lake has an average depth of 0.8 meters (2 ft 7 in) and a maximum depth of 3.3 meters (11 ft). It is 2,970 meters (9,740 ft) long, and its shoreline measures 8,270 meters (27,130 ft). It has a volume of 1,079,000 cubic meters (38,100,000 cu ft).

== See also ==
- List of lakes of Estonia
