= Cyber Command (Estonia) =

Estonian cyber operations unit

- Küberväejuhatus
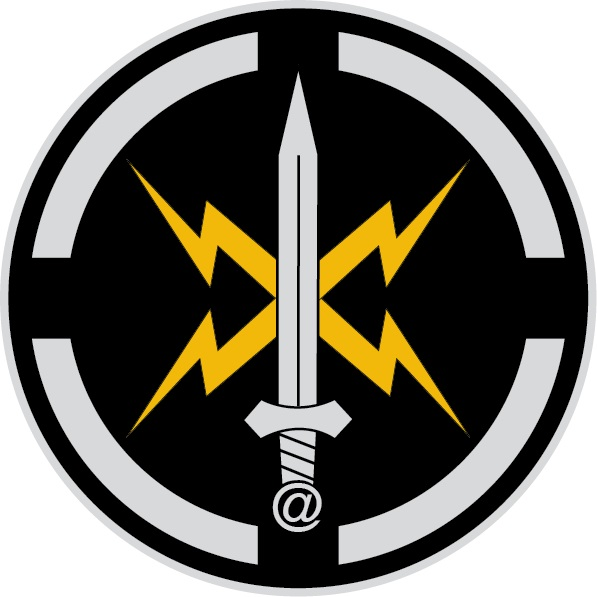
- Insignia of the Cyber Command
- Active: 2018–present
- Country: Estonia
- Type: Cyber force
- Role: Cyberwarfare
- Part of: Estonian Defence Forces
- Garrison/HQ: Juhkentali 58, 15007, Tallinn
- Anniversaries: 1 August 2018
- Website: kubervaejuhatus.ee

Commanders
- Current commander: Colonel René Innos

The Estonian Defence Forces Cyber Command (Estonian: Küberväejuhatus) is an Estonian Military command that is responsible for conducting cyber operations that support the Ministry of Defence's area of responsibility. Its tasks include ensuring the operation of IT services and conducting defensive and offensive cyberwarfare.

== History ==
The Command was established on August 1, 2018.

The planned size of the command is approximately 300 soldiers.

== Structure ==
The following units are:

- Headquarters and Support Company
- Information and Communication Technology Centre
- Cyber and Information Operations Center
- Strategic Communications Center
- Signal School

== See also ==
- List of cyber warfare forces
- Cooperative Cyber Defence Centre of Excellence (NATO)
- Estonian Defence League's Cyber Unit
- 2007 cyberattacks on Estonia
