= Vasalemma (river) =

River in Estonia

Vasalemma River
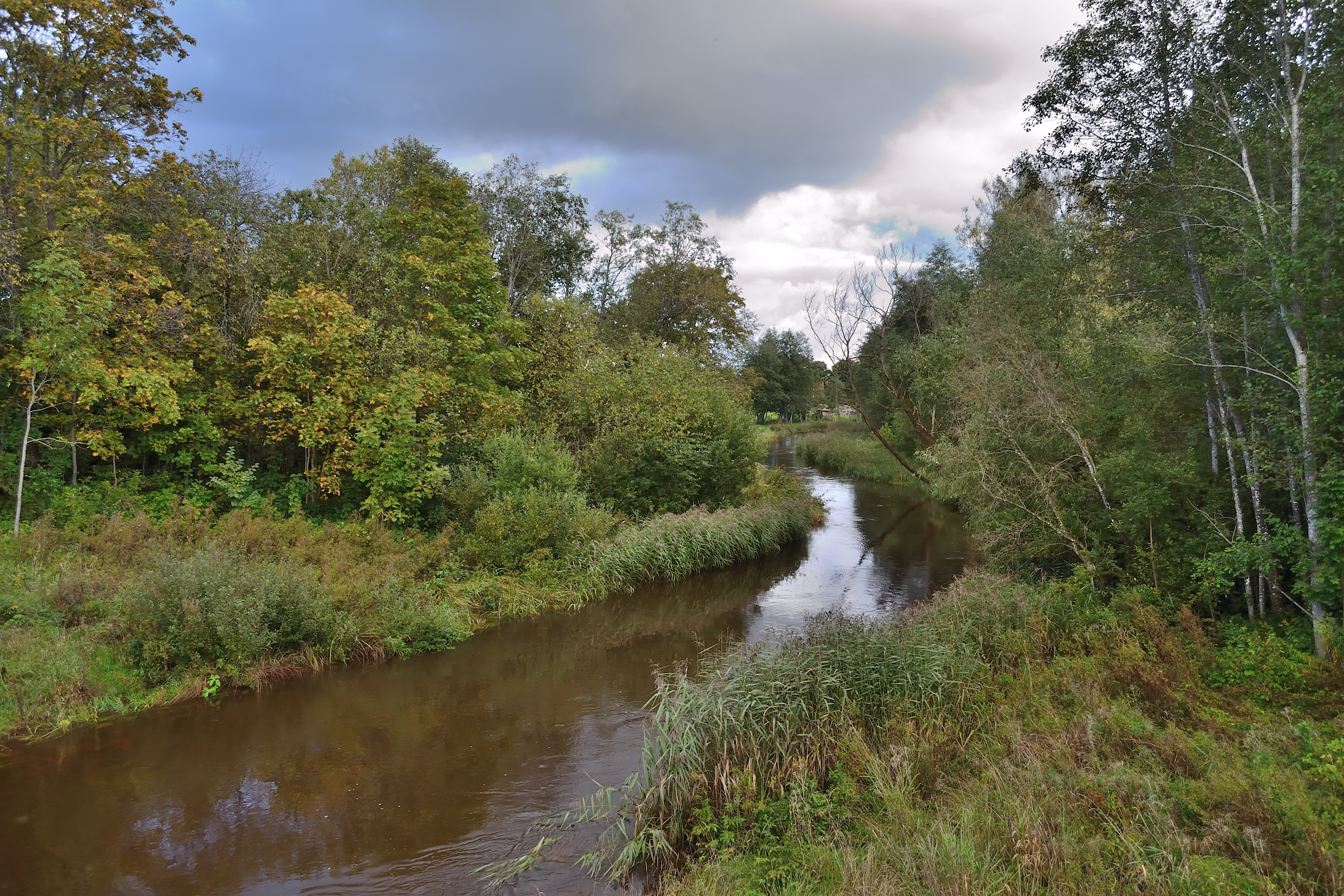

Location
- Country: Estonia

Physical characteristics
- Mouth: Gulf of Finland
  - coordinates: 59°18′17″N 24°06′59″E
- Length: 63.5 km (39.5 mi)
- Basin size: 395.6 km^{2} (152.7 sq mi)

Vasalemma River is a river in Harju County, Estonia. The river is 63.5 km long and basin size is 395.6 km^{2}. It runs into Gulf of Finland.

Trout and grayling live in the river.
