= Commander of the Air Forces (Estonia) =

The Commander of the Air Forces (Estonian: Õhuvägede ülemjuhataja) is the service chief of the Estonian Air Force. They are the principal military advisor to the Commander of the Estonian Defence Forces on matter pertaining to the Air Force. The commander is typically the highest-ranking officer in the Air Force. The current commander is Brigadier General Riivo Valge.

== Air Force commanders since 1994 ==
Nr	Start	End	Name
1	7 February 1994	1 January 1996	Colonel Vello Loemaa
Acting	1 January 1996	17 February 1997	Colonel Teo Krüüner
Acting	17 February 1997	20 February 1998	Colonel Vello Loemaa
Acting	20 February 1998	21 May 1998	Colonel Teo Krüüner
2	21 May 1998	25 August 1999	Colonel Teo Krüüner
Acting	25 August 1999	5 February 2000	Colonel Valeri Saar
2	5 February 2000	2 July 2004	Major General Teo Krüüner
Acting	24 July 2004	2 May 2005	Captain Mart Vendla
Acting	3 May 2005	20 August 2006	Colonel Valeri Saar
Acting	21 August 2006	12 March 2007	Major Rauno Sirk
3	13 March 2007	14 August 2012	Brigadier General Valeri Saar
4	15 August 2012	20 July 2018	Colonel Jaak Tarien
5	20 July 2018	19 July 2019	Colonel Riivo Valge
6	19 July 2019	20 July 2022	Brigadier General Rauno Sirk
7	20 July 2022	18 June 2025	Brigadier General Toomas Susi
8	18 June 2025	Present	Brigadier General Riivo Valge
