= Teo Krüüner =

Estonian military personnel

- Born: 8 July 1943 (age 83); Antsla, Estonia
- Military career
- Allegiance: Estonia
- Branch: Estonian Air Force
- Rank: Major General
- Commands: Commander of the Estonian Air Force (1996–2004)
- Awards: Order of the Cross of the Eagle, III class

Teo Krüüner (born 8 July 1943 in Antsla) is an Estonian Major General and former Commander of the Estonian Air Force.

Krüüner served in the Soviet Air Force from 1966 to 1991, reaching the rank of colonel. He graduated cum laude from the Chernihiv Military Aviation School of Pilots as a fighter pilot-engineer.

He studied at the Norwegian Defence College in 1992, Royal Danish Defence College in 1997 and the NATO Defense College Senior Officers' Advanced Course in Rome in 1999–2000. Until 1995, he worked as a chief specialist in the Estonian Air Force. From 1995 to 1996, he was the Chief of the Operations Department of the Air Force Staff. From 1996 until 2004, he was the Commander of the Estonian Air Force. On 14 February 2003, he was promoted to Brigadier General and on 20 July 2004, to Major General. In 2000, he was awarded with Order of the Cross of the Eagle, III class.
