= Altosaar =

Family name

Origin
- Language: Estonian
- Region of origin: Estonia

Other names
- Variant form: Altsaar

Altosaar is an Estonian surname.

As of 1 January 2021, 44 men and 42 women have the surname Altosaar. In terms of the distribution of surnames in Estonia, Altosaar ranks 2,438th for men and 2,879th for women. The surname Altosaar is most commonly found in Valga County, where there are 7.86 per 10,000 inhabitants of the county bear the name.

Notable people with the surname Altosaar include:

- Aimar Altosaar (born 1959), Estonian sociologist, journalist and politician
- Enn Altosaar (1929–1986), Estonian technical scientist
- Erich Altosaar (1908–1941), Estonian basketball player
