= Air Defence Wing (Estonia) =

Estonian military unit

- Õhukaitsedivisjon
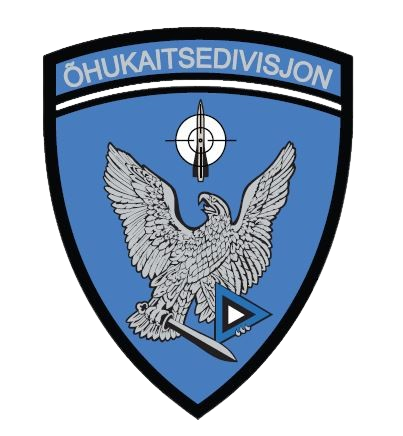
- Insignia of the Air Defence Wing
- Active: 2023–present
- Country: Estonia
- Branch: Estonian Air Force
- Type: Air defence
- Size: 3 batteries
- Part of: Estonian Defence Forces
- Garrison/HQ: Ämari Air Base
- Anniversaries: 1 July

Commanders
- Current commander: Major Kaarel Piirisalu
- Current First Sergeant: Senior Master Sergeant Argo Habakuk

The Air Defence Wing is the main air defence unit of the Estonian Air Force. It was established in 2023 for ensuring the integrity of the airspace of Estonia by planning and executing active air defense operations.

The new unit is permanently located in Ämari Air Base and it will be equipped with newly bought IRIS-T systems. Other Estonian air defence weapon systems than the IRIS-T systems are operated by Air Defence Battalion of the Estonian Land Forces.

== Structure ==
Air Defence Wing

- Headquarters
- 1st Missile battery
- (2nd Missile battery)
- (3rd Missile battery)

== Equipment ==
=== Air-defence equipment ===
Model	Image	Origin	Type	Variant	Number	Notes
IRIS-T SLM		Germany	Medium range air defense system	SLM	1 battery (+2 batteries on order)	In May 2023, Estonia and Latvia made a decision to jointly procure medium-range IRIS-T SLM. First system was delivered on the 22nd june of 2026.

=== Other equipment ===
Model	Image	Origin	Type	Variant	Number	Notes
Scania G410		Sweden	Logistical vehicle	XT	Unknown	Used as logistical vehicles as part of logistical platoons.
MAN SX44		Germany	IRIS-T platform vehicle	SX	Unknown	Used as a platform truck for IRIS-T radar, operations center and launcher.
