= Rauno Sirk =

Estonian military personnel

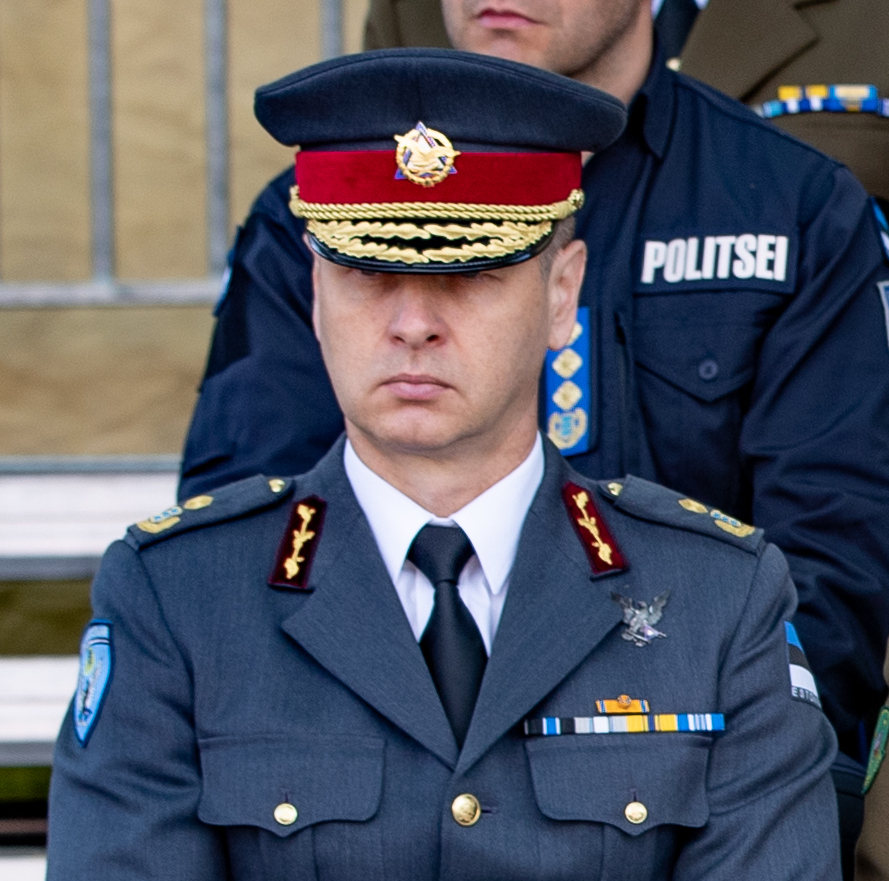
Rauno Sirk at the 2022 Victory Day parade

Rauno Sirk (born 27 June 1975 in Viljandi) is an Estonian Major General and the former Commander of the Estonian Air Force (since 2019). From 2007-2009, he served as the commander of Estonian Air Force's Headquarters. Since 2012, he is the commander of Ämari Air Base. In 2008, he was awarded with Order of the Cross of the Eagle, IV class.
