= Air Surveillance Wing (Estonia) =

Military unit of Estonia

- Õhuseiredivisjon
- Active: 1 January 1998−Present
- Country: Estonia
- Branch: Air Force
- Role: Surveillance
- Website: http://www.mil.ee/en/air_force
- Air Surveillance Wing Commander: Tõnis Pärn

Aircraft flown
- Reconnaissance: 2 Aero L-39 Albatross

The Air Surveillance Wing (Estonian: Õhuseiredivisjon (ÕSD)) is one of the three wings of the Estonian Air Force, and specializes in air surveillance.

== Structure ==
The Air Surveillance Wing is made up of three groups: the Engineering and Technical Group, which controls Estonia's five land based radars, the Ämari Command and Reporting Centre, which runs the day-to-day air policing, and the Combined Command Reporting Centre, centred in Lithuania, which controls the Baltic Air Surveillance Network, along with Lithuania and Latvia.

== Service history ==
The Air Surveillance Wing was founded on 1 January 1998, and based at Ämari Air Base, in Ämari, Estonia. The Air Surveillance Wing has worked alongside the United States Air Force and Danish Air Force on Air Policing in Iceland. From 8 to 29 March 2010, the Air Surveillance Wing provided two ground-based intercept controllers to assist four Danish F-16 Fighting Falcons during their Air Policing Patrol.

== Inventory ==
Currently the Air Surveillance Wing has 2 Aero L-39 Albatross.
