= Rumbula Air Base =

Airfield in Latvia

- IATA: none; ICAO: EVRC

Summary
- Airport type: Military
- Location: Riga, Latvia
- Elevation AMSL: 26 ft / 8 m
- Coordinates: 56°53′00″N 024°13′36″E
- Interactive map of Rumbula Air Base

Runways
Direction	Length		Surface
Direction	m	ft	Surface
	2,000	6,562	Concrete

Rumbula Air Base (ICAO: EVRC) is an air base located 11 kilometres (7 mi) southeast of Riga city centre in Latvia. The airfield was used for military purposes in the 1950s and 1960s. In the 1960s it was used as temporary passenger airport for bigger planes until the new Riga International Airport was opened in 1973. At least since 2001 there has been no military or commercial aviation based in Rumbula. Now it is mainly used as the biggest auto market in Latvia, and only about five small general aviation planes are based here. The runway is in very poor condition. It has many potholes and concrete blocks are often used to learn how to drive a car, or for "test drives" of cars to be sold at the market. It is difficult to find a continuous stretch of road without obstacles longer than 3,000 metres (9,800 ft). There are also a few "bomb-proof" camouflaged military hangars (one example is located at 56°53'08.39" N / 24°13'33.93" E). The hangars are mainly used as storage or general purpose facilities; they are not obvious on satellite images and are not freely accessible on the ground.

However, lately, mainly on weekends, motorized paragliders and ultra-light planes are using the runway. Airsport enthusiasts are taking control of the runway and stop students from driving cars so that they will not interfere with gliders and planes.

The air traffic from Rumbula can be seen flying mainly southward over Rumbula and along the Daugava river at heights of up to 300 metres (980 ft).

== History ==
The airfield was used by the USSR Air Force before and during World War II. On June 22, 1941, the 46th dive bomber aviation regiment was based at the airfield.

From 1945 to 1953, the 265th Fighter Aviation Regiment 336th Fighter Aviation Division was based at the airfield, using Yak-9U and MiG-15 aircraft. In 1953 the regiment relocated to the Poduzheme airfield in Kemsky district, Karelian Autonomous Soviet Socialist Republic.

From December 14, 1944, to February 1946, the 33rd Fighter Aviation Regiment 106th Fighter Aviation Division of the Air Defense was based at the aerodrome. The regiment covered the city of Riga from enemy air raids. In February 1946, the regiment relocated to the airfield in the city Kaunas Lithuanian SSR.

From March 2, 1946, the Romanian 164th Fighter Aviation Galatsky Red Banner Order of Suvorov Regiment was included in the 336th Fighter Aviation Division on airplanes Yak-9U, which was based at the aerodrome until April 1, 1947, after which it disbanded.

From September 1953 to 1980, the 899th Orshansky Red Banner Order of Suvorov. E. Dzerzhinsky Fighter Aviation Regiment was based at the airfield. In November 1975, the regiment took part in the suppression of the mutiny aboard the Soviet frigate Storozhevoy. In spring 1980, the regiment, part of the 1st Guards Stalingradsko-Berlinskaya Red Banner Fighter Aviation Division, 15th Air Army, moved from Riga-Rumbula to Lielvārde airfield.

In October 1965, to welcome airplanes like the Ilyushin Il-18 while Riga International Airport wasn't around yet, Rumbula Airport became the international airport of Riga for civil air traffic. It was Aeroflot Latvia's base until 1974 when it was closed because Riga International Airport had finished construction. The old airstairs of the Ilyushin Il-18s are still present in the passenger parking lot.

Currently, the airfield is used as a car market, which is the largest in Latvia, as well as for the home base of small aircraft.

== Bibliography ==
- Анохин, В. А.; Быков, М. Ю. (2014). Все истребительные авиаполки Сталина. Первая полная энциклопедия (in Russian). Moscow: Яуза-пресс. ISBN 978-5-9955-0707-9.
