= Valge =

Family name

Origin
- Language: Estonian
- Meaning: "white"
- Region of origin: Estonia

Valge is an Estonian surname meaning "white". As of 1 January 2021, 292 men and 315 women in Estonia have the surname Valge. Valge is ranked as the 154th most common surname for men in Estonia, and 159th for women. The surname Valge is the most common in Võru County, where 13.58 per 10,000 inhabitants of the county bear the surname.

Notable people bearing the Valge surname include:

- Allan Valge (1979–2015), mountaineer
- Anne Valge (1954–2013), actress
- Jaak Valge (born 1955), historian and politician
- Jüri Valge (born 1948), linguist
- Robert Valge (born 1997), basketball player
- Riivo Valge (born 1975), military colonel
- Voldemar Valge (1909–2002), singer
