= Neubrandenburg Airport =

German airport

Neubrandenburg Airport Flughafen Neubrandenburg
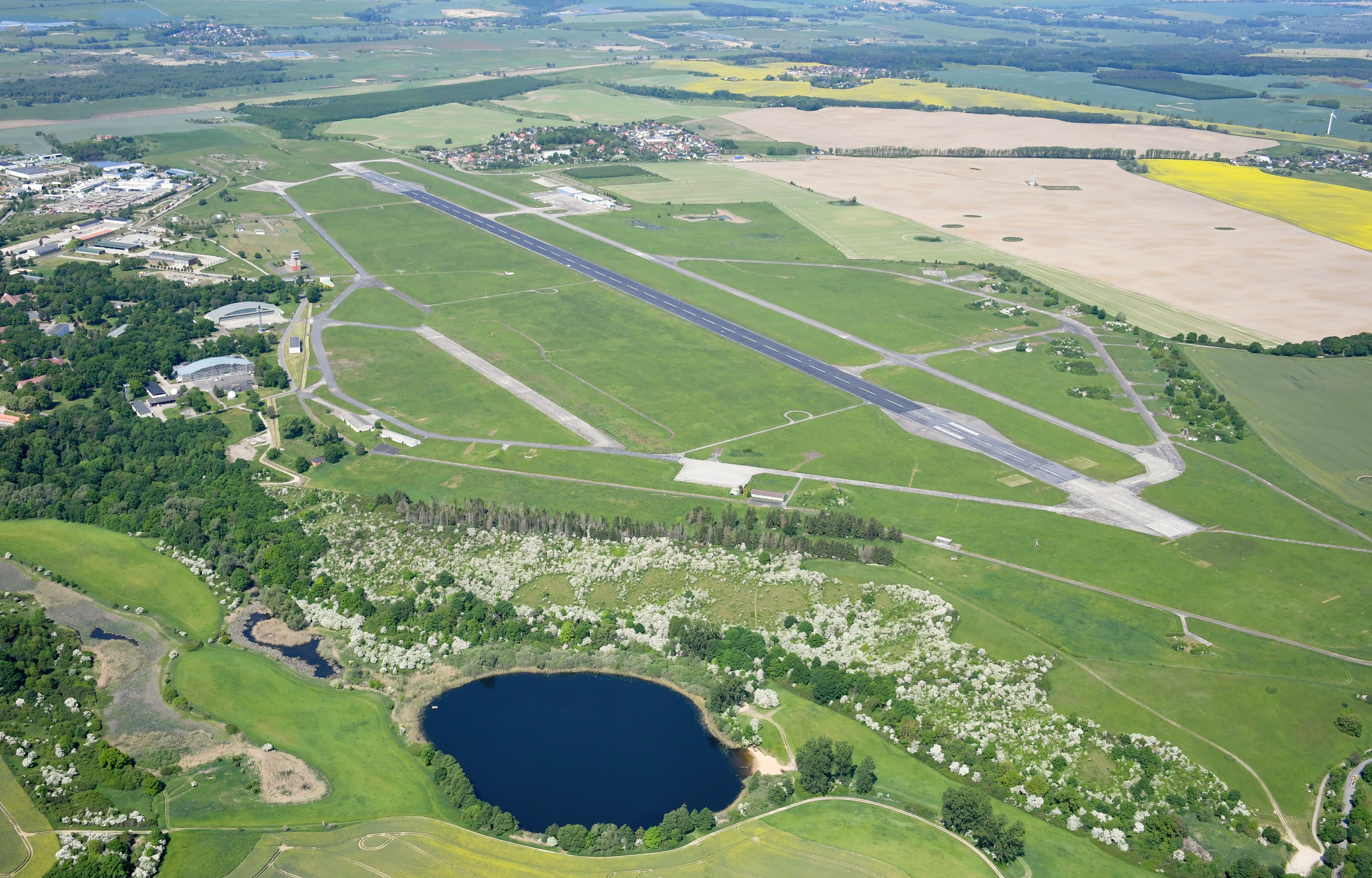
- IATA: FNB; ICAO: EDBN

Summary
- Airport type: Public
- Operator: Flughafen Neubrandenburg–Trollenhagen GmbH
- Serves: Neubrandenburg, Germany
- Location: Trollenhagen
- Built: 1934
- Elevation AMSL: 226 ft (69 m)
- Coordinates: 53°36′7.8″N 13°18′21.6″E
- Website: flughafen-neubrandenburg.de

Map
- Location of airport in Germany

Runways
Direction	Length		Surface
Direction	ft	m	Surface
09/27	7,523	2,293	Concrete
- AIP at German air traffic control.

Neubrandenburg Airport (IATA: FNB, ICAO: EDBN) is a public, general aviation airport and former military airbase located 6 km (3.7 miles) north-east of Neubrandenburg in Trollenhagen, Mecklenburg-Vorpommern, Germany.

== History ==
From 1949 to 1953 the Soviet 899th Fighter Aviation Regiment was located at the airbase.

== See also ==
- Transport in Germany
- List of airports in Germany
