= 899th Assault Aviation Regiment =

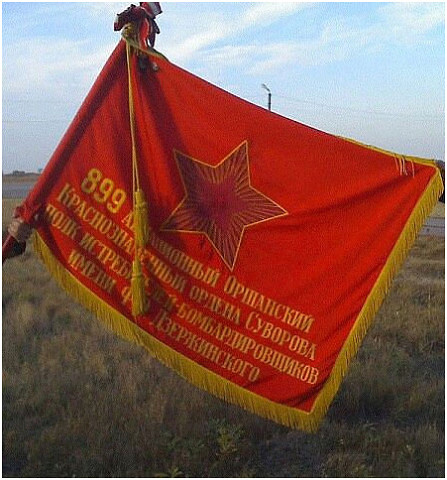
Regimental battle flag of the 899th Guards Orshansky Twice Red Banner Order of Suvorov Assault Aviation Regiment named for F.E. Dzerzhinsky

The 899th "Orsha Red Banner Order of Suvorov Regiment named after F.E. Dzerzhinsky" Assault Aviation Regiment was a regiment of the Russian Air Force, active from 1949 - 2009. In its last years it was an attack aircraft unit located at Buturlinovka in Voronezh Oblast flying the Sukhoi Su-25 "Frogfoot."

It traced its history to a corps aviation detachment, 3-й корпусной авиационный отряд originally established in June 1914.

== Regiment names ==
- 3rd Corps Aviation Detachment (06/01/1914);
- Squadron of Red Military Pilots (04/01/1919);
- 2nd Fighter Battalion (10/01/1919);
- Separate Fighter Squadron (06/05/1921);
- Separate fighter squadron named after Dzerzhinsky (03.07.1925);
- 7th separate air squadron named after Dzerzhinsky (12.1926);
- 106th Fighter Squadron named after Dzerzhinsky (05/25/1935);
- 15th Fighter Aviation Regiment named after F. E. Dzerzhinsky
- 15th Fighter Aviation Orsha Regiment named after Dzerzhinsky (07/06/1944);
- 15th Fighter Aviation Orsha Red Banner Regiment named after Dzerzhinsky (07/25/1944);
- 15th Fighter Aviation Orsha Red Banner Order of Suvorov Regiment named after Dzerzhinsky (05/28/1945);
- 899th Fighter Aviation Orsha Red Banner Order of Suvorov Regiment named after Dzerzhinsky (20.02.1949);
- 899th Aviation Orsha Red Banner Order of Suvorov Regiment of Fighter-Bombers named after Dzerzhinsky (07/01/1981);
- 899th Assault Aviation Orsha Red Banner Order of Suvorov Regiment named after Dzerzhinsky (07/01/1993);
- 899th Guards Assault Aviation Orsha Twice Red Banner Order of Suvorov Regiment named after Dzerzhinsky (05/01/1998).

== History ==
The regiment was formed on June 2, 1938, through the reorganization of the 106th Fighter Aviation Squadron (05/25/1935), and has a very long history.

On June 18, 1914, at Lida (airfield) the 3rd Corps Aviation Detachment was formed, which in April 1919 was reorganized into the Aviation Detachment of Red Military Pilots in October 1919, referred to as the 2nd Fighter Aviation Divizion (a battalion-sized unit). Since June 1921, the division has been referred to as the Separate Fighter Squadron of the Separate Air Squadron, in July 1925 it receives the honorary title and becomes the Separate Fighter Squadron Dzerzhinsky. Since December 1926, the unit has been referred to as the 7th Separate Aviation Squadron Dzerzhinsky. On May 25, 1935, the squadron received the number 106.

At the beginning of Operation Barbarossa, the German invasion of the Soviet Union, on June 22, 1941, the regiment was either part of the 7th or 8th Composite Aviation Division of the Northwestern Front.

From 1949 to 1953 the regiment was at Trollenhagen, at what is now Neubrandenburg Airport, in East Germany with the 263rd Fighter Aviation Division.

In spring 1980, the 899th Fighter Aviation Regiment, part of the 1st Guards Stalingradsko-Berlinskaya Red Banner Fighter Aviation Division, 15th Air Army, moved from Riga-Rumbula also in Latvia to Lielvārde airfield. In July 1981 the regiment was redesignated as a Fighter-Bomber Aviation Regiment, and shifted to the 39th Fighter-Bomber Aviation Division, still within the Air Forces, but now within the Air Forces of the Baltic Military District, as they had become in 1981. The 899th Regiment was withdrawn to Buturlinovka, Voronezh Oblast, in June–July 1993.
