= Trollenhagen =

- Municipality
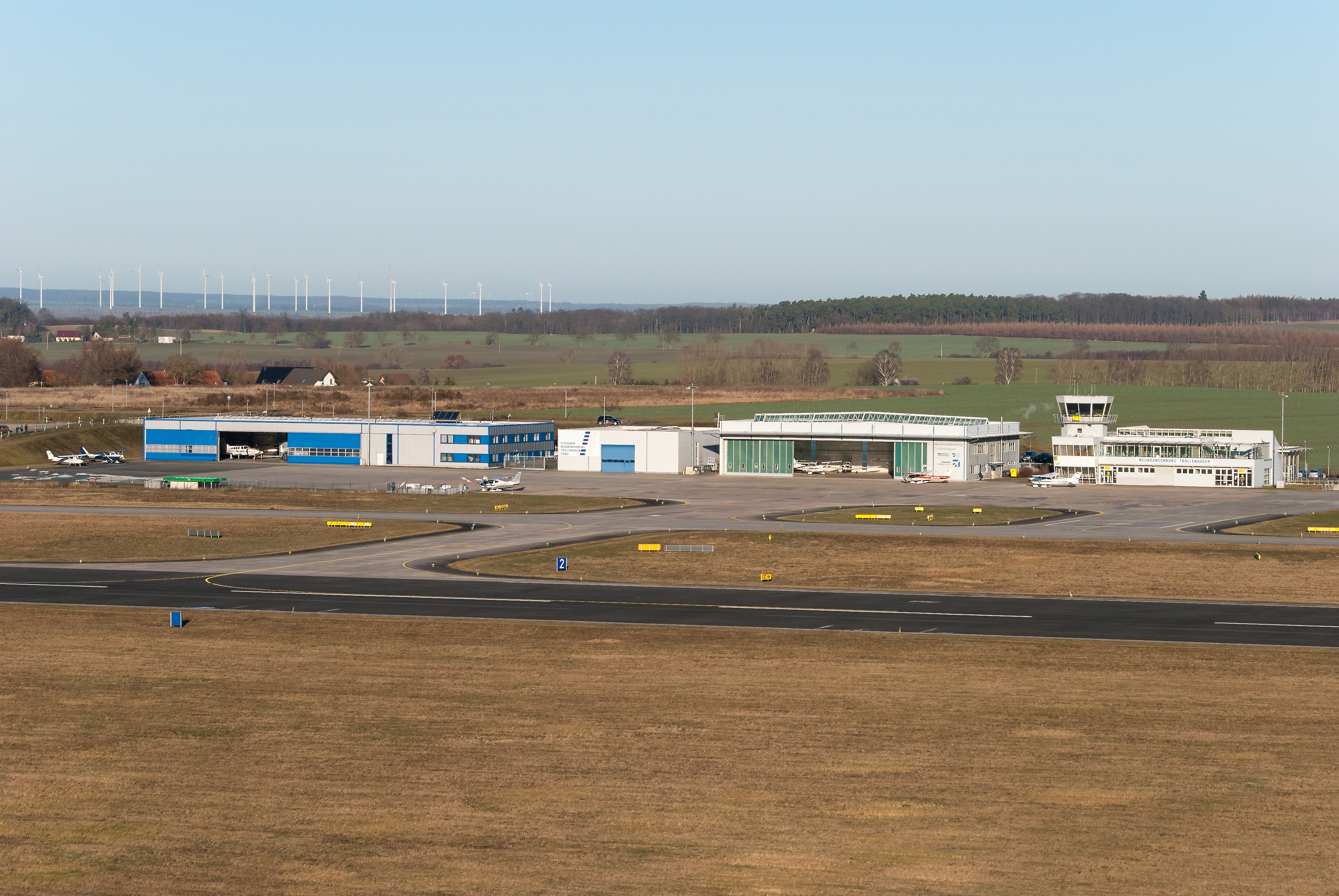
- Neubrandenburg Airport in Trollenhagen

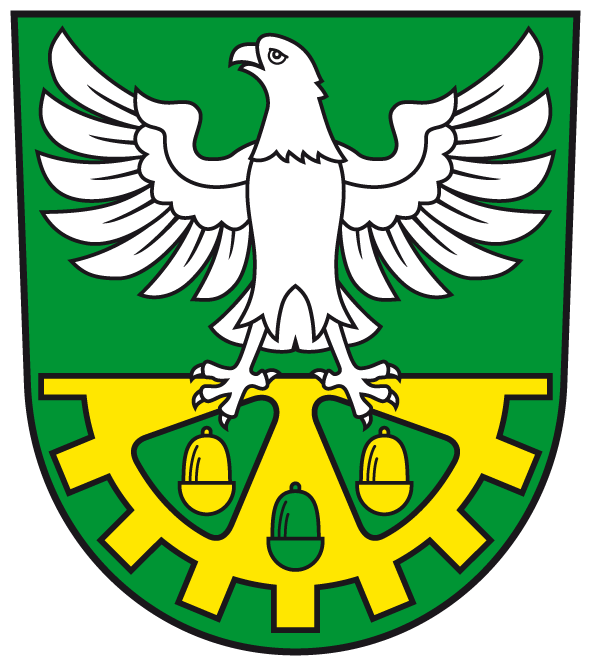
- Coat of arms

- Location of Trollenhagen within Mecklenburgische Seenplatte district
- Interactive map of Trollenhagen
- Location within Germany Location within Mecklenburg-Vorpommern
- Coordinates: 53°35′N 13°17′E
- Country: Germany
- State: Mecklenburg-Vorpommern
- District: Mecklenburgische Seenplatte
- Municipal assoc.: Neverin

Government
  - Mayor: Dr. Emil Ressin

Area
  - Total: 17.81 km^{2} (6.88 sq mi)
- Elevation: 63 m (207 ft)

Population (2025-12-31)
  - Total: 917
  - Density: 51.5/km^{2} (133/sq mi)
- Time zone: UTC+01:00 (CET)
  - Summer (DST): UTC+02:00 (CEST)
- Postal codes: 17039
- Dialling codes: 0395
- Vehicle registration: MST
- Website: www.amt-neverin.de

Trollenhagen is a municipality in the district Mecklenburgische Seenplatte, in Mecklenburg-Vorpommern, in north-eastern Germany. Formerly the home of an East German Air Force base.

== History ==
During World War II, the Nazis operated a forced labour subcamp of the prison in Dreibergen.

From 1949 to 1953 the Soviet 899th Fighter Aviation Regiment was located at the airbase.
