= Baltic Air Defence =

NATO air defence mission

Coordinates: 55.8939°N 23.3950°E

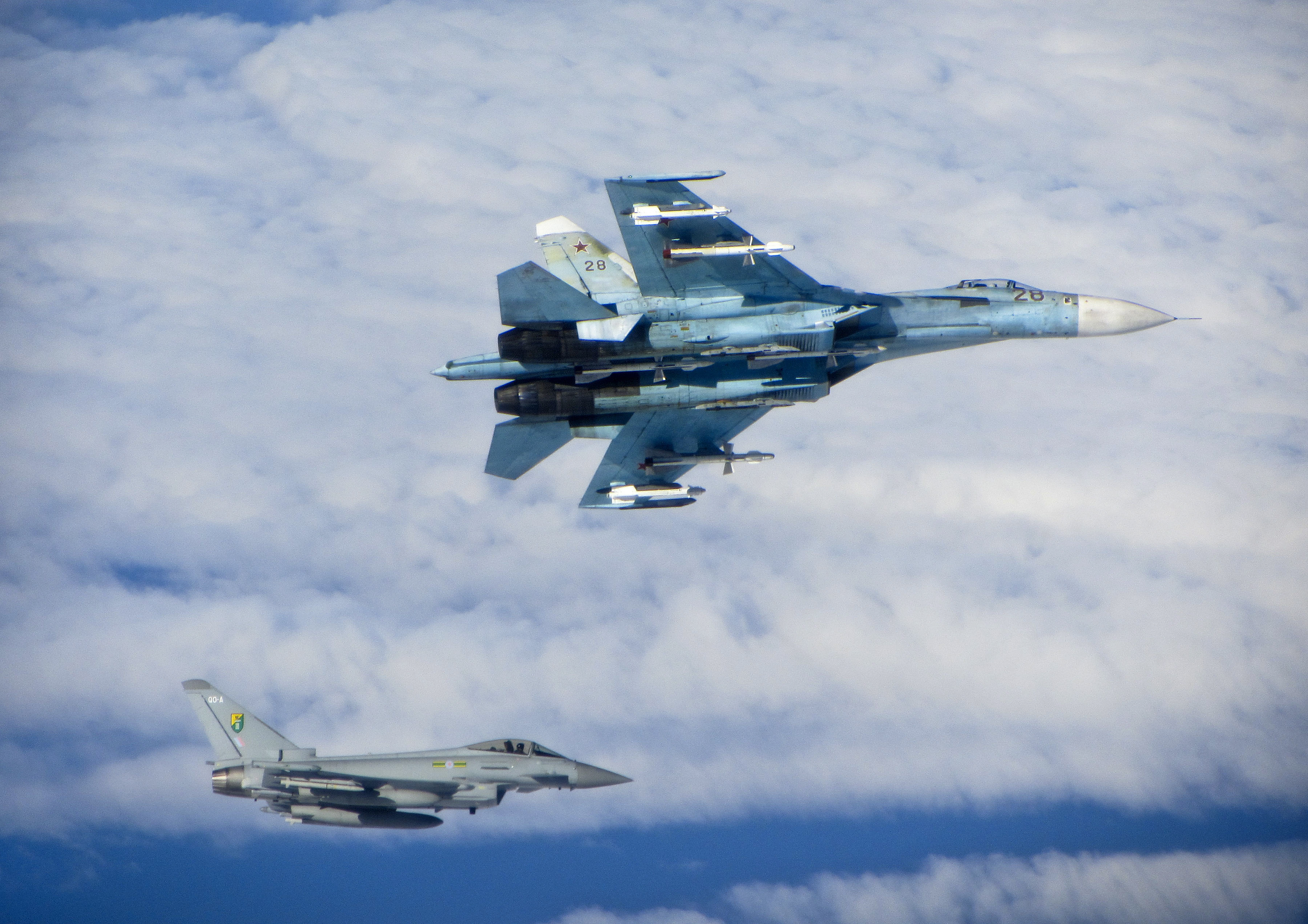
- Royal Air Force Eurofighter Typhoon (bottom) escorts Russian Air Force Su-27 Flanker (top) over the Baltic Sea in June 2014
- Location: Estonia, Latvia and Lithuania
- Date: 30 March 2004 – present
- Executed by: NATO
- Outcome: Ongoing

The Baltic Air Defence mission (formerly, Baltic Air Policing) is a NATO Quick Reaction Alert (QRA) and air defence deployment that protects the airspace of the Baltic states (Estonia, Latvia and Lithuania).

== Mission ==
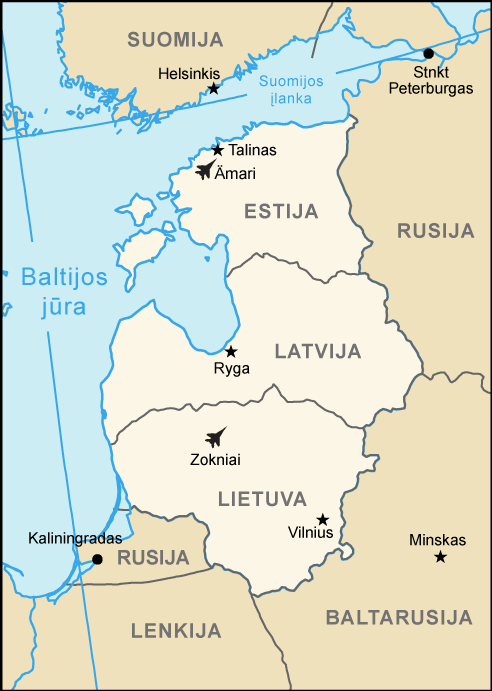
Location of the Ämari Air Base and Šiauliai Air Base (Zokniai) in the Baltic states.

Within the Alliance, preserving airspace integrity is conducted as a collective task jointly and collectively using fighter aircraft for air policing. Air policing is a purely defensive mission. Since the 1970s, NATO has established a comprehensive system of air surveillance and airspace management means, as well as Quick Reaction Alert (QRA) assets for intercepts (QRA(I)) provided by its member nations.

By means of radar sites, remote data transmission, Control and Reporting Centres (CRCs) and Combined Air Operations Centres (CAOCs) the Alliance ensures constant surveillance and control of its assigned airspace 24 hours a day and 365 days a year. NATO exploits these facilities to react within seconds to air traffic incidents in the Allies’ airspace. This structure of weapon systems, control centres and procedures is referred to as the NATO Integrated Air Defence System (NATINADS). NATINADS has been and remains one cornerstone of Alliance solidarity and cohesion.

The responsible Allied Air Headquarters are at Izmir, Turkey, and Ramstein, Germany. The dividing line is the Alps. The Headquarters Allied Air Command Ramstein’s air area of responsibility is divided into two Implementation Areas controlled each controlled by a CAOC.

NATO members without their own Air Policing assets are assisted by other NATO members. Luxembourg is covered by interceptors from Belgium, Slovenia is covered by the Italian Air Force and Albania is covered by Italian aircraft.

Since March 2004, when the Baltic States joined NATO, the 24/7 task of policing the airspace of the Baltic States was conducted on a three-month rotation from Zokniai Air Base in Lithuania and, starting from 2014, at the Ämari Air Base in Harju County, Estonia. Starting with the Turkish deployment, rotations changed to a four-month basis. Usual deployments consist of four fighter aircraft with between 50 and 100 support personnel.

To ensure Air Policing performance is conducted in a safe and professional way, adequate training was and still is required, as NATO member nations deploy their assets to Šiauliai Air Base, Lithuania, on a rotational basis. To standardize training across nations, Headquarters Allied Air Command Ramstein introduced a series of training events formerly called Baltic Region Training Events, now referred to as Ramstein Alloy to capitalize on experienced aircrews deployed to Šiauliai and to offer superior training for Estonian, Latvian and Lithuanian air forces and control facilities. The three host nations contributed €2.2 million in 2011 to cover the deployment expenses and are supposed to contribute €3.5 million yearly by 2015. In 2012, the Alliance allocated €7 million for Šiauliai airfield modernisation from the Security Investment Programme.

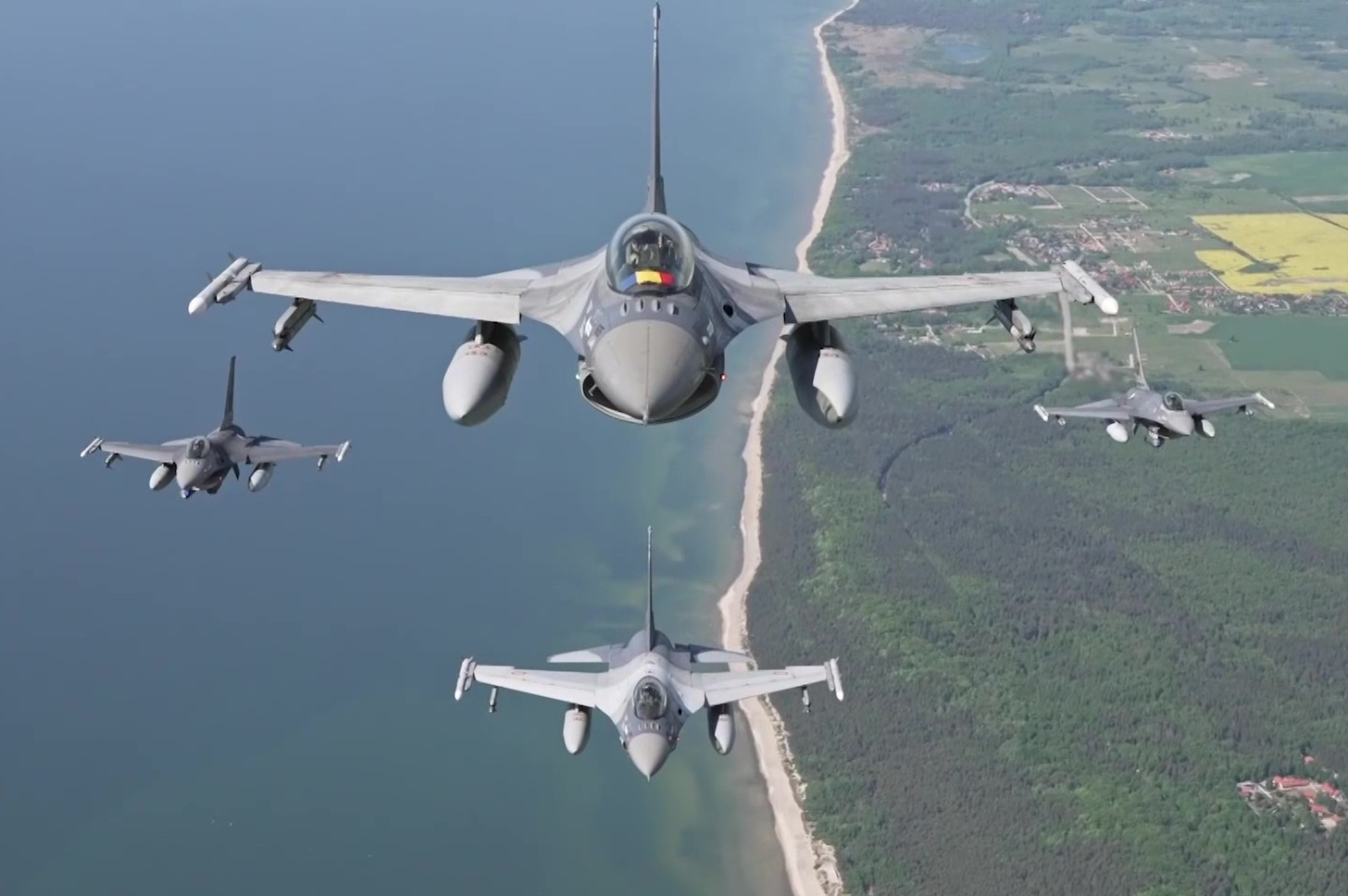
Romanian and Portuguese F-16s flying over Lithuania (May 2023)

French Rafale intercepts Russian An-30 (June 2026)

Hungary performed the mission for the first time in 2015. Italy carried out the mission in January–April 2015, with 14 members having participated in Baltic Air Policing so far.

In 2013, the Baltic patrol was called in when the Swedish Air Force was unable to respond to a simulated attack by Russian bombers against Stockholm.

During the annexation of Crimea by the Russian Federation, the U.S. Air Force deployed six F-15C Eagle fighter jets from US-run Lakenheath air base in eastern England to the Lithuanian Air Force Base near Šiauliai. These aircraft will augment the present mission comprising four U.S. F-15C Eagle aircraft. The U.S. heightened its NATO presence to increase the strength of the Baltic Air Policing mission. Another two U.S. KC-135 aerial refuelling aircraft brought aircraft service personnel.

In May 2014, NATO established its second air base in Estonia's Ämari near Tallinn, beginning with a Danish deployment. In May 2014, Polish Air Force units at Malbork Air Base were reinforced by the French Air Force.

In January 2022, due to the massing of Russian military forces along its border with Ukraine; American and Danish fighter jets were deployed to the NATO Baltic Air Policing detachments in Estonia and Lithuania, respectively, to provide enhanced air policing (eAP) over the Baltic States.

According to a former staff member of the National Defence University of Finland, the Baltic air bases are untenable in a war scenario as they lack hardened aircraft shelters, which make them vulnerable to attack. Also, Russia operates long-range SAMs in Kaliningrad, Pskov and Leningrad Oblast, which might severely hamper or stop air operations from the area.

In May 2023, the Latvian Minister of Defence, Ināra Mūrniece, announced that NATO fighter jets will be temporarily stationed at Lielvārde Air Base during the spring to autumn of 2024 whilst Ämari Air Base undergoes reconstruction work.

On 19 September 2025 three Russian Mikoyan-Gurevich MiG-31 aircraft entered into Estonian airspace and remained there for approximately twelve minutes, before they were forced to exit by Italian F-35.

Following the 2026 Ankara NATO summit, the Baltic Air Policing mission was redesignated as the Baltic Air Defence. The main changes occurred within NATO's internal decision-making process, giving the Supreme Allied Commander Europe more flexibility to respond to changes in the security environment and to protect NATO territory against a broader range of threats across all operational domains. This change will also speed up the process of engaging objects that threaten the population, such as drones.

== Combat history ==
On 19 May 2026, a Ukrainian drone was shot down over Estonia by a Romanian F-16. The drone had entered Estonian airspace from Russia under conditions of heavy Russian electronic warfare and was shot down by orders of the Combined Air Operations Center Uedem to "minimise the impact on the civilian population and infrastructure".

On 8 June 2026, another drone was shot down by a French Dassault Rafale over Latvia. According to the Latvian army, the drone entered its airspace from Russia as a result of Russian electronic warfare. The drone was identified as a Ukrainian Maya decoy drone. Another drone was shot down over Latvia by an Italian Eurofighter Typhoon on 14 August 2026.

On 15 September 2026, an Italian Eurofighter Typhoon shot down a drone that entered Lithuanian airspace from Belarus. Italian Eurofighter jets responded to a drone incursion into Lithuania again on 11 November 2026. One missile was shot but failed to hit the drone. A second attempt to engage the drone was made but the fighter experienced technical difficulties and returned to base.

== Deployments ==
NATO Baltic Air Policing medal bar

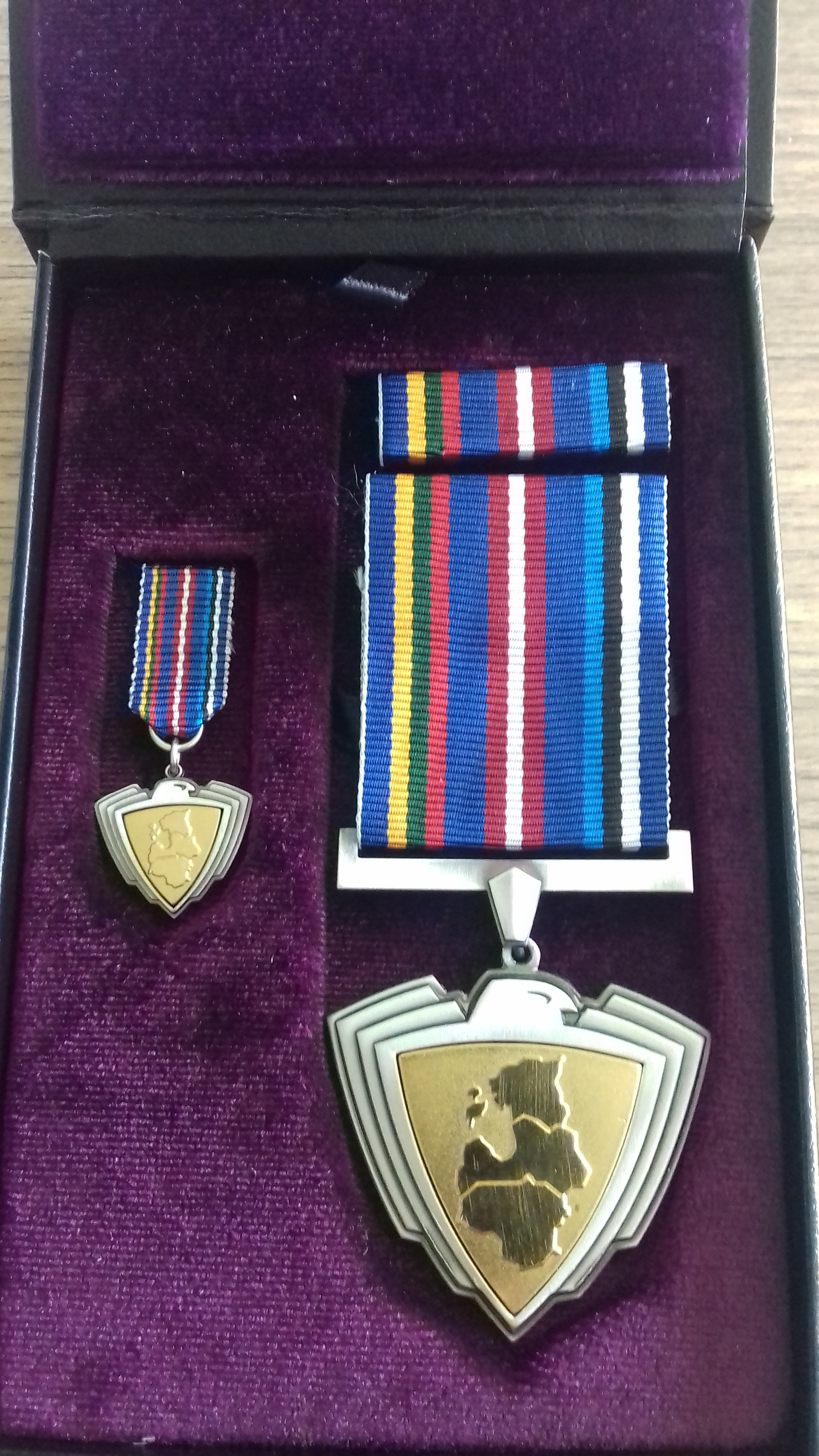
NATO Baltic Air Policing Medal

Starting date	Country	Air force	Aircraft	Based in	Reference
30 March 2004	Belgium	(Belgium) Belgian Air Component	4 x F-16AM Fighting Falcon	Šiauliai, Lithuania	
1 July 2004	Denmark	Royal Danish Air Force	4 x F-16AM Fighting Falcon	Šiauliai, Lithuania	
30 October 2004	United Kingdom	Royal Air Force	4 x Panavia Tornado F.3	Šiauliai, Lithuania	
1 January 2005	Norway	Royal Norwegian Air Force	4 x F-16AM Fighting Falcon	Šiauliai, Lithuania	
30 March 2005	Netherlands	Royal Netherlands Air Force	4x F-16AM Fighting Falcon	Šiauliai, Lithuania	
30 June 2005	Germany	German Air Force	4 x F-4F Phantom II	Šiauliai, Lithuania	
12 October 2005	United States	United States Air Force	4 x F-16CJ Fighting Falcon	Šiauliai, Lithuania	
1 January 2006	Poland	Polish Air Force	4 x MiG-29A	Šiauliai, Lithuania	
31 March 2006	Turkey	Turkish Air Force	4 x F-16C Fighting Falcon	Šiauliai, Lithuania	
1 August 2006	Spain	Spanish Air Force	3 x Mirage F1M	Šiauliai, Lithuania	
1 December 2006	Belgium	(Belgium) Belgian Air Component	4 x F-16AM Fighting Falcon	Šiauliai, Lithuania	
1 April 2007	France	French Air Force	4 x Mirage 2000C	Šiauliai, Lithuania	
1 August 2007	Romania	Romanian Air Force	4 x MiG-21 Lancer 'C'	Šiauliai, Lithuania	
1 November 2007	Portugal	Portuguese Air Force	4 x F-16AM Fighting Falcon	Šiauliai, Lithuania	
16 December 2007	Norway	Royal Norwegian Air Force	4 x F-16AM Fighting Falcon	Šiauliai, Lithuania	
15 March 2008	Poland	Polish Air Force	4 x MiG-29A	Šiauliai, Lithuania	
30 June 2008	Germany	German Air Force	4 x F-4F Phantom II	Šiauliai, Lithuania	
30 September 2008	United States	United States Air Force	4 x F-15C Eagle	Šiauliai, Lithuania	
2 January 2009	Denmark	Royal Danish Air Force	4 x F-16AM Fighting Falcon	Šiauliai, Lithuania	
1 May 2009	Czech Republic	Czech Air Force	4 x JAS 39C Gripen	Šiauliai, Lithuania	
1 September 2009	Germany	German Air Force	4 x Eurofighter Typhoon	Šiauliai, Lithuania	
3 November 2009	Germany	German Air Force	4 x F-4F Phantom II	Šiauliai, Lithuania	
4 January 2010	France	French Air Force	4 x Mirage 2000C	Šiauliai, Lithuania	
1 May 2010	Poland	Polish Air Force	4 x MiG-29A	Šiauliai, Lithuania	
1 September 2010	United States	United States Air Force	4 x F-15C Eagle	Šiauliai, Lithuania	
5 January 2011	Germany	German Air Force	6 x F-4F Phantom II	Šiauliai, Lithuania	
28 April 2011	France	French Air Force	4 x Mirage 2000C	Šiauliai, Lithuania	
2 September 2011	Denmark	Royal Danish Air Force	4 x F-16AM Fighting Falcon	Šiauliai, Lithuania	
4 January 2012	Germany	German Air Force	6 x F-4F Phantom II	Šiauliai, Lithuania	
26 April 2012	Poland	Polish Air Force	4 x MiG-29A	Šiauliai, Lithuania	
1 September 2012	Czech Republic	Czech Air Force	4 x JAS 39C Gripen	Šiauliai, Lithuania	
3 January 2013	Denmark	Royal Danish Air Force	4 x F-16AM Fighting Falcon	Šiauliai, Lithuania	
30 April 2013	France	French Air Force	4 x Mirage F1CR	Šiauliai, Lithuania	
3 September 2013	Belgium	(Belgium) Belgian Air Component	4 x F-16AM Fighting Falcon	Šiauliai, Lithuania	
3 January 2014	United States	United States Air Force	4 x F-15C Eagle	Šiauliai, Lithuania	
1 May 2014	Poland	Polish Air Force	4 x MiG-29A	Šiauliai, Lithuania	
1 May 2014	United Kingdom	Royal Air Force	4 x Eurofighter Typhoon	Šiauliai, Lithuania	
1 May 2014	Denmark	Royal Danish Air Force	4 x F-16AM Fighting Falcon	Ämari, Estonia	
1 September 2014	Portugal	Portuguese Air Force	6 x F-16AM Fighting Falcon	Šiauliai, Lithuania	
1 September 2014	Canada	Royal Canadian Air Force	4 x CF-188 Hornet	Šiauliai, Lithuania	
1 September 2014	Germany	German Air Force	4 x Eurofighter Typhoon	Ämari, Estonia	
1 January 2015	Italy	Italian Air Force	4 x Eurofighter Typhoon	Šiauliai, Lithuania	
2 January 2015	Spain	Spanish Air Force	4 x Eurofighter Typhoon	Ämari, Estonia	
5 January 2015	Poland	Polish Air Force	4 x MiG-29A	Šiauliai, Lithuania	
1 May 2015	Norway	Royal Norwegian Air Force	4 x F-16AM Fighting Falcon	Šiauliai, Lithuania	
1 May 2015	Italy	Italian Air Force	4 x Eurofighter Typhoon	Šiauliai, Lithuania	
1 May 2015	United Kingdom	Royal Air Force	4 x Eurofighter Typhoon	Ämari, Estonia	
25 August 2015	Germany	German Air Force	4 x Eurofighter Typhoon	Ämari, Estonia	
31 August 2015	Hungary	Hungarian Air Force	4 x JAS 39C Gripen	Šiauliai, Lithuania	
7 January 2016	Spain	Spanish Air Force	4 x Eurofighter Typhoon	Šiauliai, Lithuania	
7 January 2016	Belgium	(Belgium) Belgian Air Component	4 x F-16AM Fighting Falcon	Ämari, Estonia	
28 April 2016	United Kingdom	Royal Air Force	4 x Eurofighter Typhoon	Ämari, Estonia	
4 May 2016	Portugal	Portuguese Air Force	4 x F-16AM Fighting Falcon	Šiauliai, Lithuania	
31 August 2016	France	French Air Force	4 x Mirage 2000-5F	Šiauliai, Lithuania	
31 August 2016	Germany	German Air Force	4 x Eurofighter Typhoon	Ämari, Estonia	
5 January 2017	Netherlands	Royal Netherlands Air Force	4 x F-16AM Fighting Falcon	Šiauliai, Lithuania	
5 January 2017	Germany	German Air Force	4 x Eurofighter Typhoon	Ämari, Estonia	
2 May 2017	Poland	Polish Air Force	4 x F-16C Fighting Falcon	Šiauliai, Lithuania	
3 May 2017	Spain	Spanish Air Force	5 x EF-18 Hornet	Ämari, Estonia	
30 August 2017	United States	United States Air Force	4 x F-15C Eagle	Šiauliai, Lithuania	
5 September 2017	Belgium	(Belgium) Belgian Air Component	4 x F-16AM Fighting Falcon	Ämari, Estonia	
8 January 2018	Denmark	Royal Danish Air Force	4 x F-16AM Fighting Falcon	Šiauliai, Lithuania	
10 January 2018	Italy	Italian Air Force	4 x Eurofighter Typhoon	Ämari, Estonia	
2 May 2018	Portugal	Portuguese Air Force	4 x F-16AM Fighting Falcon	Šiauliai, Lithuania	
2 May 2018	Spain	Spanish Air Force	6 x Eurofighter Typhoon	Šiauliai, Lithuania	
3 May 2018	France	French Air Force	4 x Mirage 2000-5F	Ämari, Estonia	
30 August 2018	Germany	German Air Force	4 x Eurofighter Typhoon	Ämari, Estonia	
31 August 2018	Belgium	(Belgium) Belgian Air Component	4 x F-16AM Fighting Falcon	Šiauliai, Lithuania	
3 January 2019	Poland	Polish Air Force	4 x F-16C Fighting Falcon	Šiauliai, Lithuania	
1 May 2019	Hungary	Hungarian Air Force	4 x JAS 39C Gripen	Šiauliai, Lithuania	
1 May 2019	Spain	Spanish Air Force	5 x EF-18 Hornet	Šiauliai, Lithuania	
1 May 2019	United Kingdom	Royal Air Force	4 x Eurofighter Typhoon	Ämari, Estonia	
3 September 2019	Belgium	(Belgium) Belgian Air Component	4 x F-16AM Fighting Falcon	Šiauliai, Lithuania	
3 September 2019	Denmark	Royal Danish Air Force	4 x F-16AM Fighting Falcon	Šiauliai, Lithuania	
3 September 2019	Czech Republic	Czech Air Force	4 x JAS 39C Gripen	Ämari, Estonia	
2 January 2020	Poland	Polish Air Force	4 x F-16C Fighting Falcon	Ämari, Estonia	
30 April 2020	France	French Air Force	4 x Mirage 2000-5F	Ämari, Estonia	
1 May 2020	United Kingdom	Royal Air Force	4 x Eurofighter Typhoon	Šiauliai, Lithuania	
1 May 2020	Spain	Spanish Air Force	6 x EF-18 Hornet	Šiauliai, Lithuania	
15 July 2020	Germany	German Air Force	4 x Eurofighter Typhoons	Šiauliai, Lithuania	
31 August 2020	Germany	German Air Force	6 x Eurofighter Typhoons	Ämari, Estonia	
4 September 2020	Italy	Italian Air Force	4 x Eurofighter Typhoon	Šiauliai, Lithuania	
30 April 2021	Italy	Italian Air Force	4 x F-35A Lightning II	Ämari, Estonia	
30 April 2021	Spain	Spanish Air Force	7 x Eurofighter Typhoon	Šiauliai, Lithuania	
31 August 2021	Denmark	Royal Danish Air Force	4 x F-16AM Fighting Falcon	Šiauliai, Lithuania	
31 August 2021	Portugal	Portuguese Air Force	4 x F-16AM Fighting Falcon	Šiauliai, Lithuania	
15 September 2021	Italy	Italian Air Force	4 x Eurofighter Typhoon	Ämari, Estonia	
30 November 2021	Poland	Polish Air Force	4 x F-16C Fighting Falcon	Šiauliai, Lithuania	
1 December 2021	Belgium	(Belgium) Belgian Air Component	4 x F-16AM Fighting Falcon	Ämari, Estonia	
26 January 2022	United States	United States Air Force	6 x F-15E Eagle	Ämari, Estonia	
29 January 2022	Denmark	Royal Danish Air Force	4 x F-16AM Fighting Falcon	Šiauliai, Lithuania	
13 March 2022	France	French Air and Space Force	4 x Mirage 2000-5F	Ämari, Estonia	
1 April 2022	Czech Republic	Czech Air Force	5 x JAS 39C Gripen	Šiauliai, Lithuania	
1 April 2022	Spain	Spanish Air Force	8 x EF-18 Hornet	Šiauliai, Lithuania	
1 August 2022	Hungary	Hungarian Air Force	4 x JAS 39C Gripen	Šiauliai, Lithuania	
1 August 2022	Germany	German Air Force	4 x Eurofighter Typhoons	Ämari, Estonia	
1 October 2022	Poland	Polish Air Force	4 x F-16C Fighting Falcon	Šiauliai, Lithuania	
6 October 2022	Belgium	(Belgium) Belgian Air Component	6 x F-16AM Fighting Falcon	Ämari, Estonia	
1 December 2022	France	French Air and Space Force	4 x Dassault Rafale	Šiauliai, Lithuania	
1 March 2023	United Kingdom	Royal Air Force	4 x Eurofighter Typhoon	Ämari, Estonia	
31 March 2023	Portugal	Portuguese Air Force	4 x F-16AM Fighting Falcon	Šiauliai, Lithuania	
31 March 2023	Romania	Romanian Air Force	4 x F-16AM Fighting Falcon	Šiauliai, Lithuania	
3 August 2023	Spain	Spanish Air Force	8 x Eurofighter Typhoon	Ämari, Estonia	
3 August 2023	Italy	Italian Air Force	4 x Eurofighter Typhoon	Šiauliai, Lithuania	
30 November 2023	Belgium	(Belgium) Belgian Air Component	4 x F-16AM Fighting Falcon	Šiauliai, Lithuania	
30 November 2023	France	French Air and Space Force	4 x Mirage 2000-5F	Šiauliai, Lithuania	
30 November 2023	Poland	Polish Air Force	4 x F-16C Fighting Falcon	Ämari, Estonia	
1 March 2024	Germany	German Air Force	5 x Eurofighter Typhoons	Lielvārde, Latvia	
1 April 2024	Spain	Spanish Air Force	8 x EF-18 Hornet	Šiauliai, Lithuania	
1 April 2024	Portugal	Portuguese Air Force	4 x F-16AM Fighting Falcon	Šiauliai, Lithuania	
30 July 2024	Italy	Italian Air Force	4 x Eurofighter Typhoon	Šiauliai, Lithuania	
1 December 2024	France	French Air and Space Force	4 x Dassault Rafale	Šiauliai, Lithuania	
1 December 2024	Netherlands	Royal Netherlands Air Force	4 x F-35A Lightning II	Ämari, Estonia	
28 March 2025	Portugal	Portuguese Air Force	4 x F-16AM Fighting Falcon	Ämari, Estonia	
31 March 2025	Poland	Polish Air Force	4 x F-16C Fighting Falcon	Šiauliai, Lithuania	
31 March 2025	Romania	Romanian Air Force	4 x F-16AM Fighting Falcon	Šiauliai, Lithuania	
28 July 2025	Italy	Italian Air Force	4 x F-35A Lightning II	Ämari, Estonia	
30 July 2025	Spain	Spanish Air Force	8 x Eurofighter Typhoon	Šiauliai, Lithuania	
30 July 2025	Hungary	Hungarian Air Force	4 x JAS 39C Gripen	Šiauliai, Lithuania	
1 October 2025	Italy	Italian Air Force	4 x Eurofighter Typhoon	Ämari, Estonia	
27 November 2025	Spain	Spanish Air Force	11 x EF-18 Hornet	Šiauliai, Lithuania	
31 March 2026	Romania	Romanian Air Force	6 x F-16AM Fighting Falcon	Šiauliai, Lithuania	
31 March 2026	France	French Air and Space Force	4 x Dassault Rafale	Šiauliai, Lithuania	
31 March 2026	Portugal	Portuguese Air Force	4 x F-16AM Fighting Falcon	Ämari, Estonia	
24 July 2026	Italy	Italian Air Force	4 x Eurofighter Typhoon	Šiauliai, Lithuania	
29 July 2026	Turkey	Turkish Air Force	5 x F-16C Fighting Falcon	Ämari, Estonia	
27 August 2026	Spain	Spanish Air Force	4 x EF-18 Hornet	Ämari, Estonia	
29 October 2026	Belgium	(Belgium) Belgian Air Force	6 x F-16AM Fighting Falcon	Šiauliai, Lithuania	

== Accidents ==
- 30 August 2011 – A French Mirage collided with a Lithuanian Aero L-39 Albatros jet trainer, which crashed into a marsh. Both pilots ejected.
- 29 April 2013 – A Danish F-16 landed in Tallinn after it suffered a bird strike, which caused minor engine damage.
- 9 October 2015 – A German Eurofighter's right external tank dropped "while taxiing to the start position" on the taxiway in Ämari airbase, Estonia. The necessary torque of the tightening bolts "was not present".
- 8 August 2018 – A Spanish Eurofighter accidentally launched an AMRAAM missile without a target while on patrol over Estonia. The missile was not confirmed to have self-destructed as designed.

== Gallery ==
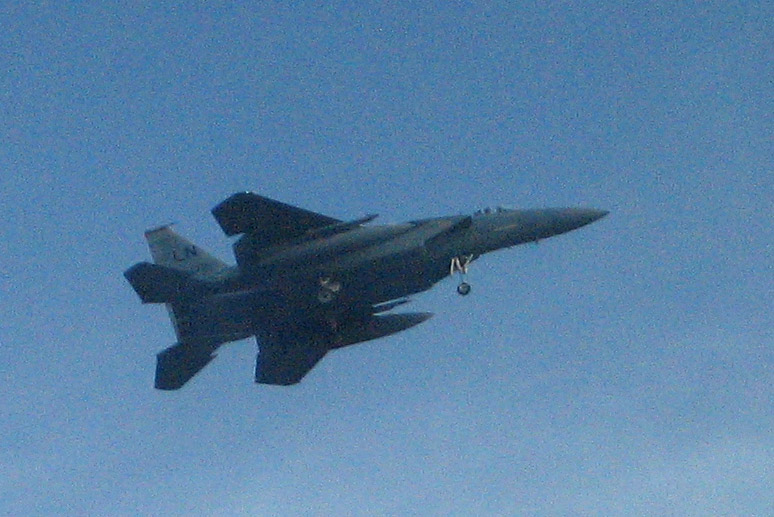
US Air Force F-15C Eagle near Vilnius (November 2008)

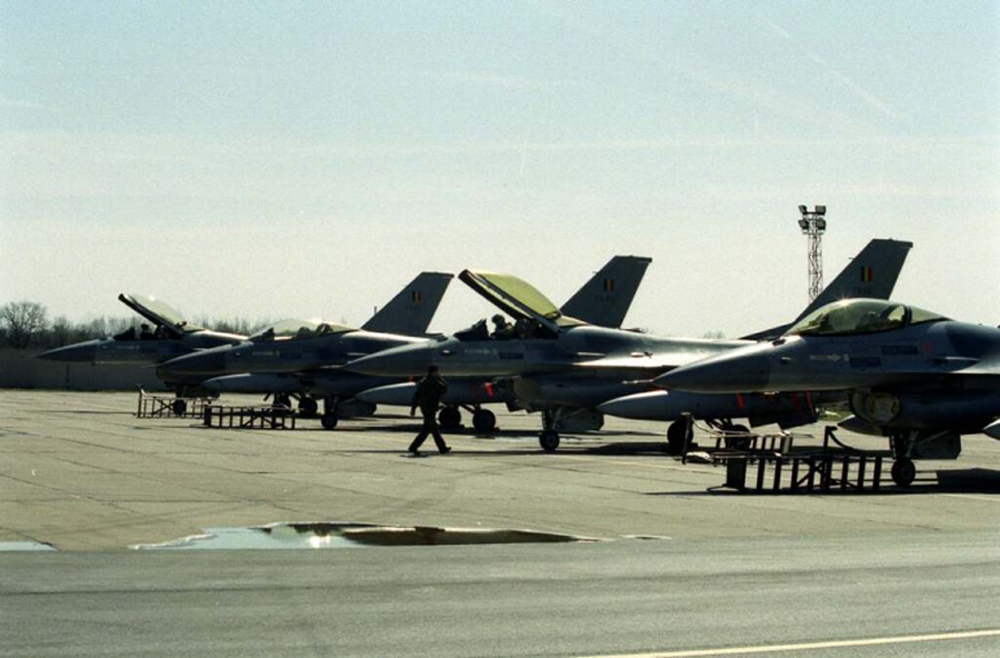
Squadron of Belgian Air Component F-16 Fighting Falcon fighters (Lithuania, 2009)

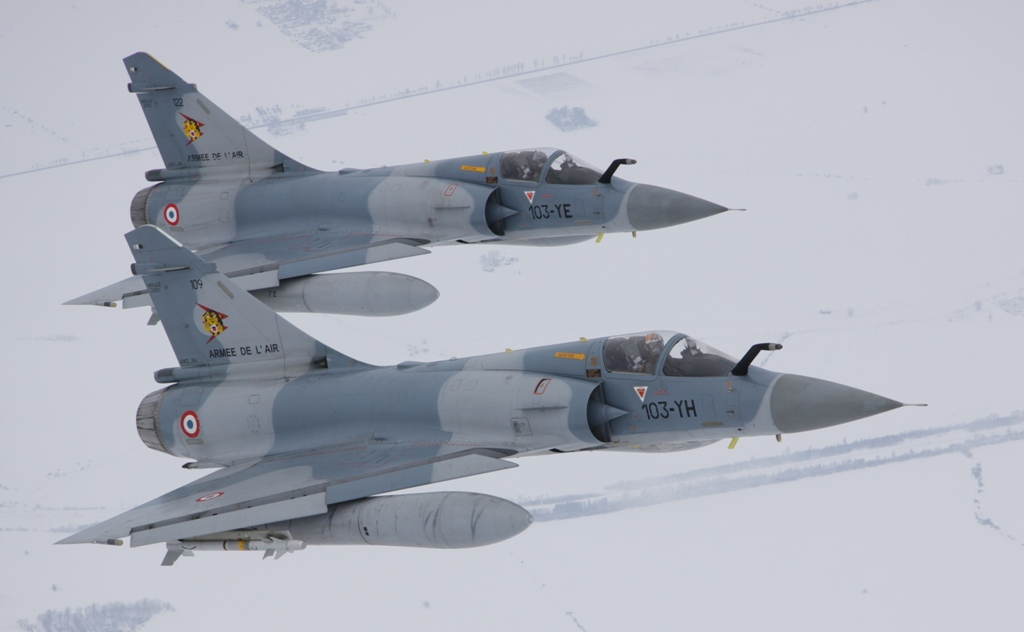
French Mirage 2000s (Lithuania, 2010)

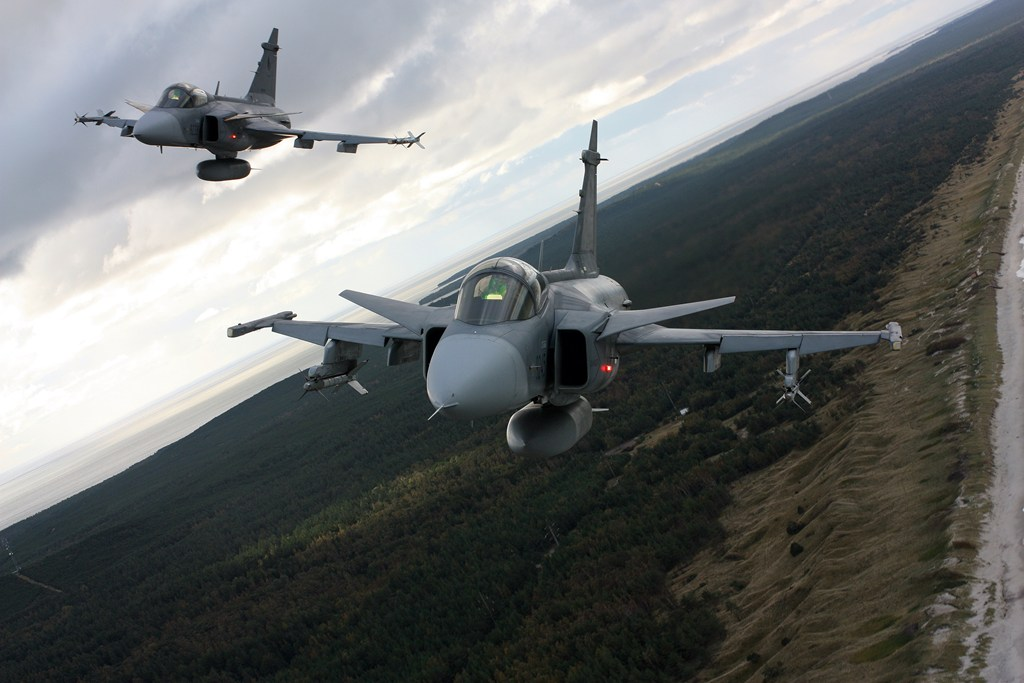
Czech Saab JAS 39 Gripen fighters over the Curonian Spit in 2012

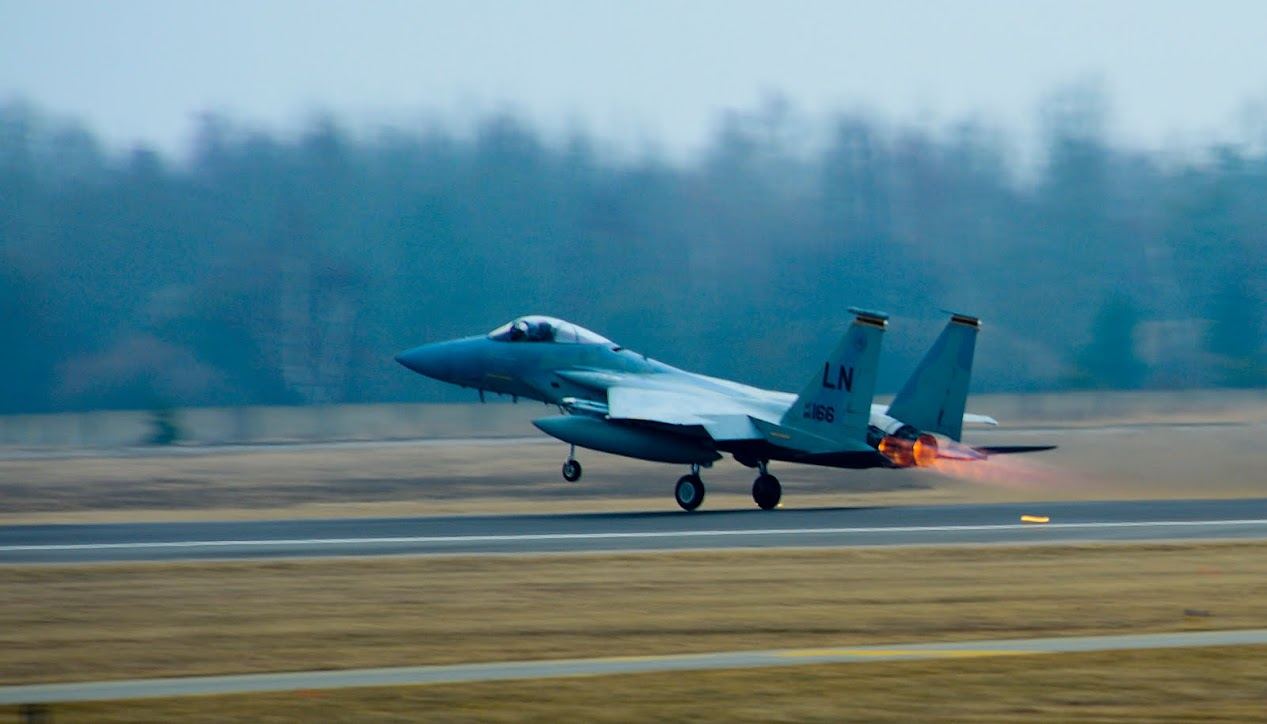
US Air Force F-15C Eagle taking off (Šiauliai Air Base, March 2014)

Royal Air Force Eurofighter Typhoon over Lithuania, 2014

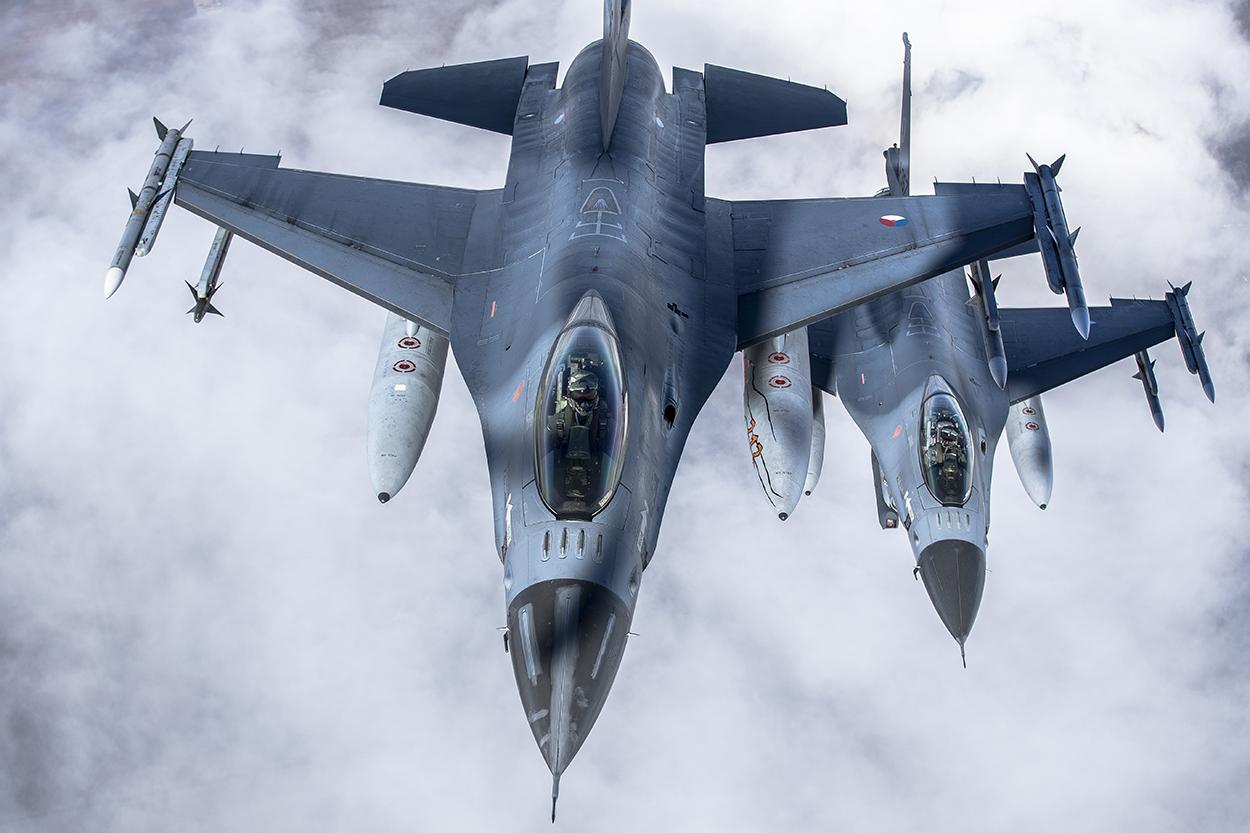
Royal Netherlands Air Force F-16s (Lithuania, March 2017)

Dutch F-35 and Portuguese F-16 at Ämari Air Base (April 2025)

== See also ==
- Icelandic Air Policing
