= Benno Leesik =

Estonian military personnel

Benno Leesik (17 January 1960 Haapsalu – 2006) was an Estonian military officer (Major).

In 1996 he graduated from Tartu University in law.

From 8 June 1999 to 25 March 2006, he was the chief of Estonian Defence League.

Awards:

- Estonian Air Force Service Cross
