= Antsla =

Town in Estonia

- Town
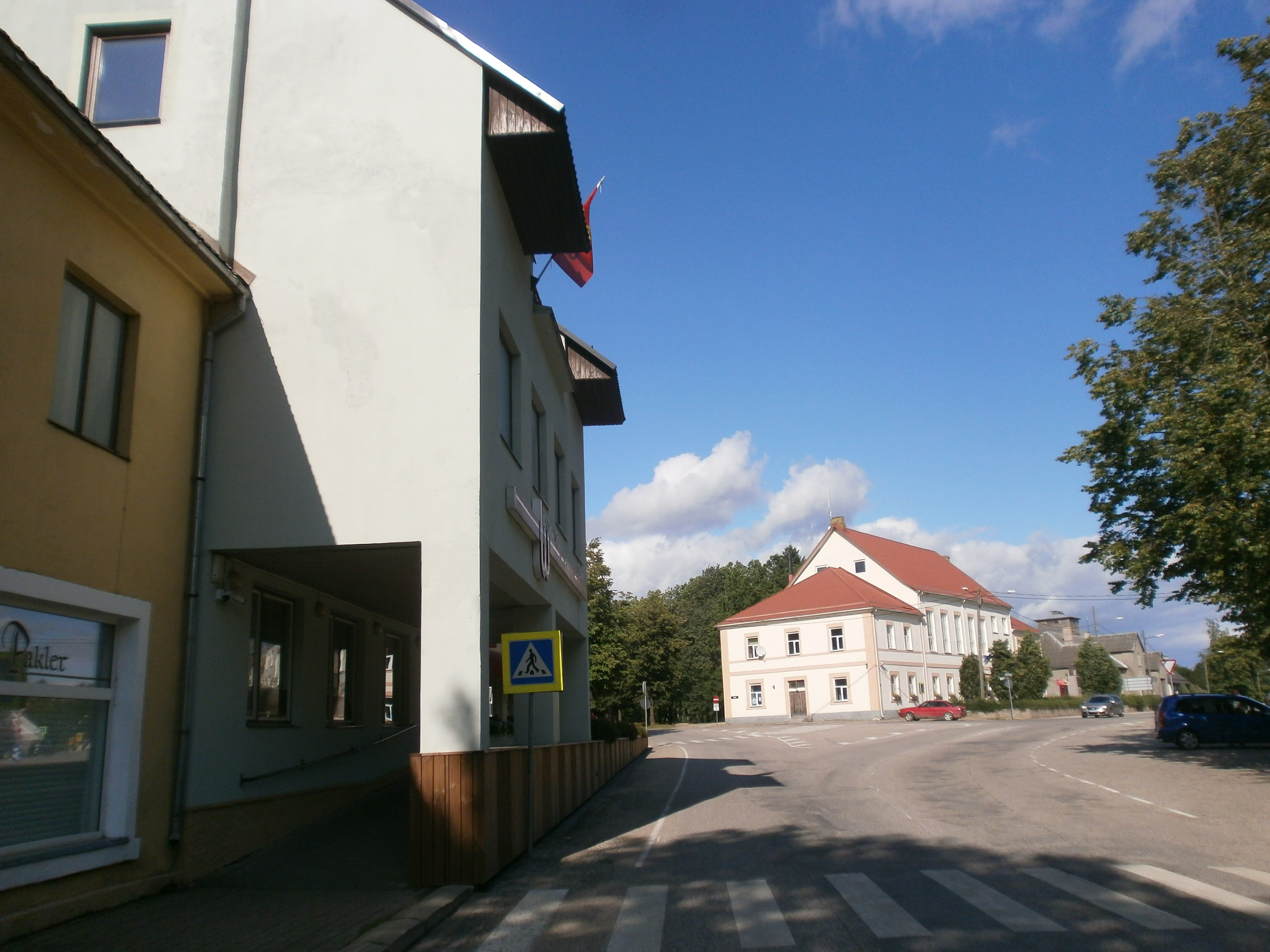
- Town center

- Location in Estonia
- Coordinates: 57°49′45″N 26°31′44″E
- Country: Estonia
- County: Võru County
- Municipality: Antsla Parish

Population (2026)
  - Total: 1,201
  - Rank: 41st
- Time zone: UTC+2 (EET)
  - Summer (DST): UTC+3 (EEST)

Antsla (German: Anzen) is a town in Võru County, southern Estonia, it is the administrative seat of Antsla Parish.

The borough of Antsla was reclassified as a third-rank town by Konstantin Päts on 1 May 1938. The settlement was first attested in 1405. The town has a furniture factory.

During the Second World War, Soviet forces captured Antsla in August 1944; German losses included hundreds of troops and large quantities of equipment.

Antsla is located on the Valga–Pechory railway, but train traffic on the line has been inactive since 2001.

== Notable people ==
- Halja Klaar (1930–2021), film artist
- Teo Krüüner (born 1943), military Major general
- Maarja Nummert (1944–2024), architect of school buildings.
- Joel Luhamets (born 1952), Lutheran prelate, bishop of the Southern Region
- Aimar Altosaar (born 1959), sociologist and politician
- Vilja Toomast (born 1962), politician, former MEP
- Vahur Kersna (born 1962), journalist, radio, TV personality and caricaturist.
- Urmas Välbe (born 1966), cross-country skier, competed in the 1992 & 1994 Winter Olympics
- Andrus Värnik (born 1977), javelin thrower, competed in the 2000 & 2004 Summer Olympics

== Gallery ==
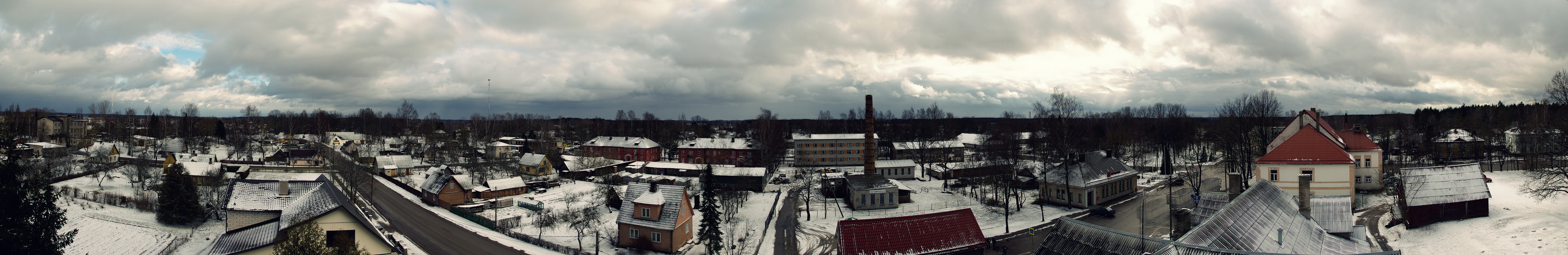
Panorama of Antsla
