= Halja Klaar =

Estonian film artist (1930–2021)

- Born: 17 December 1930; Antsla, Estonia
- Died: 20 February 2021 (aged 90)
- Occupation: Film artist

Halja Klaar (17 December 1930 – 20 February 2021) was an Estonian film artist.

== Biography ==
After she graduated from the Antsla Gymnasium in 1950, Klaar entered the Estonian Academy of Arts, graduating in 1957 with a degree in theatrical decoration. From 1957 to 1986, she worked as a production artist at Tallinnfilm. She worked on 20 feature films, including Dangerous Curves, Vallatud kurvid, Inimesed sõdurisinelis, Punane viiul, Reigi õpetaja, and others.

Halja Klaar died on 20 February 2021 at the age of 90.

== Awards ==
- Merited Artist of the Estonian SSR (1982)
- Lifetime Achievement Award of the Estonian Cultural Endowment's Audiovisual Arts Endowment (2016)
