= Estonian Air Force =

Air warfare branch of Estonia's military

- Eesti Õhuvägi
- Emblem of the Estonian Air Force
- Active: 1919–1940; 1991–present
- Country: Estonia
- Type: Air force
- Role: Aerial warfare
- Size: 400 personnel
- Part of: Estonian Defence Forces
- Garrison/HQ: Ämari Air Base, Tallinn
- Motto: Pro patria ad astra! (For the Fatherland to the Stars!)
- March: Lennuväepoiste laul
- Engagements: Estonian War of Independence
- Decorations: Estonian Air Force Service Cross

Commanders
- Commander of the Air Forces: Brigadier General Riivo Valge

Insignia
- Roundel

- Fin flash

- Flag

Aircraft flown
- Trainer: Aero L-39
- Transport: M-28 Skytruck

The Estonian Air Force (Estonian: Eesti Õhuvägi, [ˈeˑstʲi] [ˈɤhuvæki]) is the aviation branch of the Estonian Defence Forces. The air force traces its history to 1918, and was re-established in its current form in 1991.

As of 2024, the Estonian Air Force has a strength of ~400 personnel. It operates unarmed aircraft and several radar systems and IRIS-T SLM Air Defence systems. Its main tasks are to provide surveillance of Estonian air space and support the country's ground forces. In addition, the air force hosts units from other NATO countries at its single operational air base.

== History ==
=== 1918–1940 ===
Estonian B.E.2 in the Estonian War of Liberation

The roots of the current organization go back to the Russian revolution of February 1917, after which the Estonian state obtained a degree of autonomy within Russia, which included the establishment of national armed forces. Thus many Estonians in the Russian Army returned home to take up arms for their homeland. The Estonian Declaration of Independence in early 1918 was not recognized by Germany, which invaded and occupied the country during 1918. The Estonian armed forces were disbanded.

After the armistice on 11 November 1918, the Estonian Provisional Government immediately set about establishing a military aviation unit. On 21 November 1918 Voldemar Victor Riiberg, the Commander of the Engineering Battalion, assigned August Roos to organize a flight unit. The Aviation Company of the Engineer Battalion began to establish air bases near Tallinn for seaplanes and land planes, but it was not until January 1919 that the first operational aircraft was acquired – a captured Soviet Farman HF.30.

In the meantime, on 22 November 1918, the Soviet Red Army had attacked Estonia and soon occupied most of the country. The fledgling Estonian Army, with foreign assistance, managed to counter-attack in early January 1919 and went on to liberate the country by late February. It subsequently moved on to liberate Latvia. Aviation Company aircraft flew a limited number of missions in support of the army. Following the February 1920 peace treaty of Tartu with the Soviet Russia, the Estonian Army was demobilized, but the Aviation Company was retained. With the delivery of more aircraft, it was reorganized as an Aviation Regiment (Estonian: Lennuväe rügement), comprising a landplane squadron, seaplane squadron, flying school and workshops. More bases and seaplane stations were built.

Some Aviation Regiment pilots were involved in a pro-Soviet coup attempt on 1 December 1924, but this was crushed within hours. From 1925 the First World War era aircraft were gradually replaced by more modern types. During 1928 the Aviation Regiment came under the control of an Air Defence (Estonian: Õhukaitse) organization which included the Anti-Aircraft Artillery.

In 1939 the Estonian Air Force consisted of about 80 active airplanes: Bristol Bulldog, Hawker Hart and Potez 25 biplanes from the 1920s, but also the more modern Avro Anson multipurpose aircraft, in three groups stationed at Rakvere, Tartu, and Tallinn. The Navy also maintained two multipurpose aircraft wings.

Plans to acquire Spitfires and Lysanders from Britain were thwarted when the outbreak of World War II in 1939 forced Britain to cancel all export orders. After the defeat of Poland, Estonia was forced to accept a Mutual Assistance Pact with the Soviet Union, signed on 28 September 1939. This allowed the Soviets to establish military bases in Estonia, which were later used in the Winter War against Finland. On 17 June 1940 the three Baltic States were invaded by Soviet forces. During the June 1940 invasion the Air Defence took no action and subsequently aircraft remained locked in their hangars. The air force became the Aircraft Squadron of the 22nd Territorial Rifle Corps of the Red Army in the summer of 1940.

=== 1991–present ===
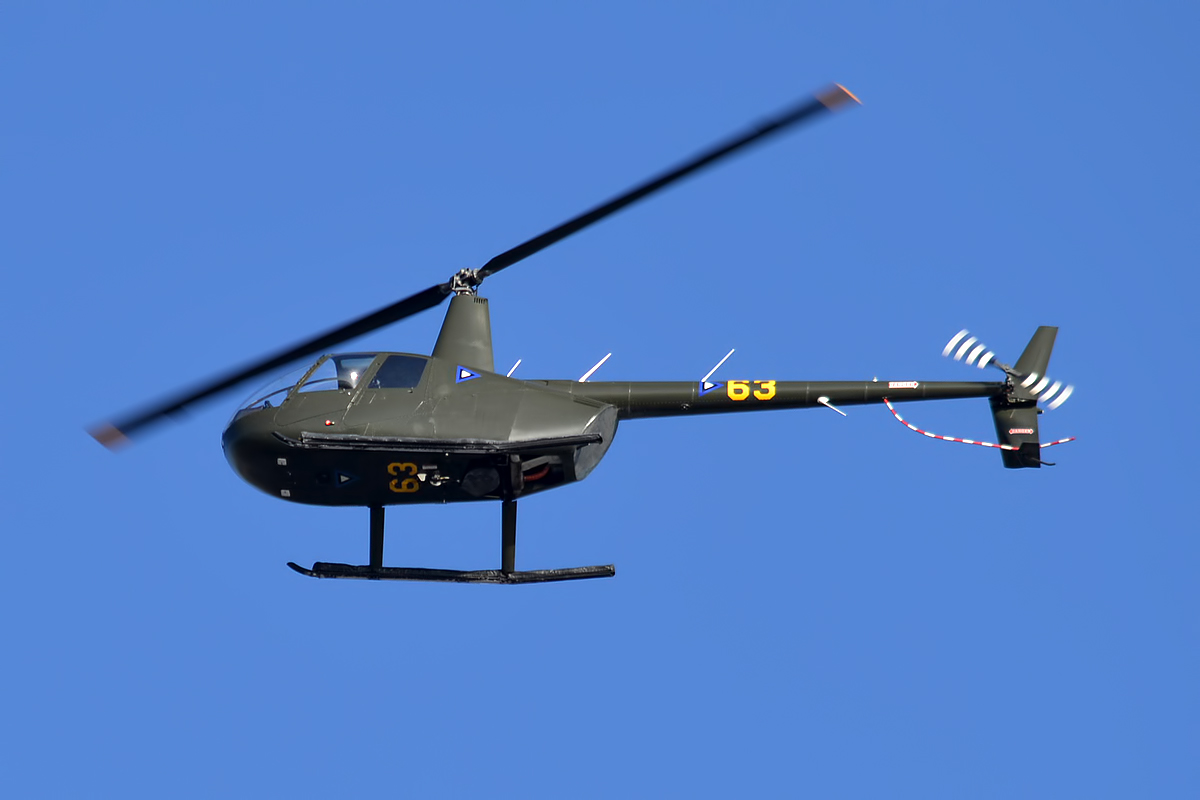
An Estonian Air Force R44

The Estonian Air Force was re-established on 16 December 1991 after the restoration of independence of the Republic of Estonia in 1991. The Air Force was slow to reform because the Soviets had damaged or destroyed most of their infrastructure before leaving. The Air Force Command and Control Headquarters was formed in Tallinn on 13 April 1994.

In February 1993 the German government donated two Let L-410UVPs transport aircraft. In October 1994 three Mi-2 helicopters were delivered, followed by four Mi-8s in November 1995. Initially the Air Force was tasked with ground-based air surveillance and air defence using only old Soviet radars and anti-aircraft artillery equipment. On 15 May 1997 the Air Force moved into the former Soviet Su-24 base at Ämari, southwest of Tallinn. In 1997–98 two of the Mi-8s were upgraded.

The Estonian Air Force has been rebuilding the military infrastructure left by the Soviet military. Most of the funds have been directed to the Ämari military airfield whose renovation was completed in 2011. The objective of developing Ämari Air Base is to cooperate with NATO and partner nations' air forces, and being able to supply standardized airfield and aircraft services necessary for Host Nation Support. Due to the lack of modern and developed military aviation infrastructure, the Air Force's development has been very slow.

On July 1, 2023, a new unit was made for the Air Force, the Air Defence Wing which operates the IRIS-T SLM Air Defence systems.

Ämari Airbase was renovated in 2024 at a cost of €18.5 million, €12 million of which was contributed by Luxembourg. During the renovations, the Baltic Air Policing mission was temporarily stationed at Lielvārde in Latvia.

In December 2024, all Robinson R-44 helicopters and Antonov An-2's were retired. These were the last helicopters and bi-planes of the Estonian Air Force.

== Organization ==
One of the main goals of the Air Force is to build up an air surveillance system, which will be the cornerstone of the air traffic safety and airspace control. The second priority is the development of the Host Nation Support capabilities for air operations with further implementation of crucial peacetime Air Defence capability – Baltic Air Policing. One important milestone will be the development of the air surveillance system to the level, which allows close cooperation with the NATO air defence system. The purpose of Ämari Air Base is to work together with NATO and partner nations air forces and provide the standardized airfield and aircraft services to provide the Host Nation Services.

=== Structure and units ===
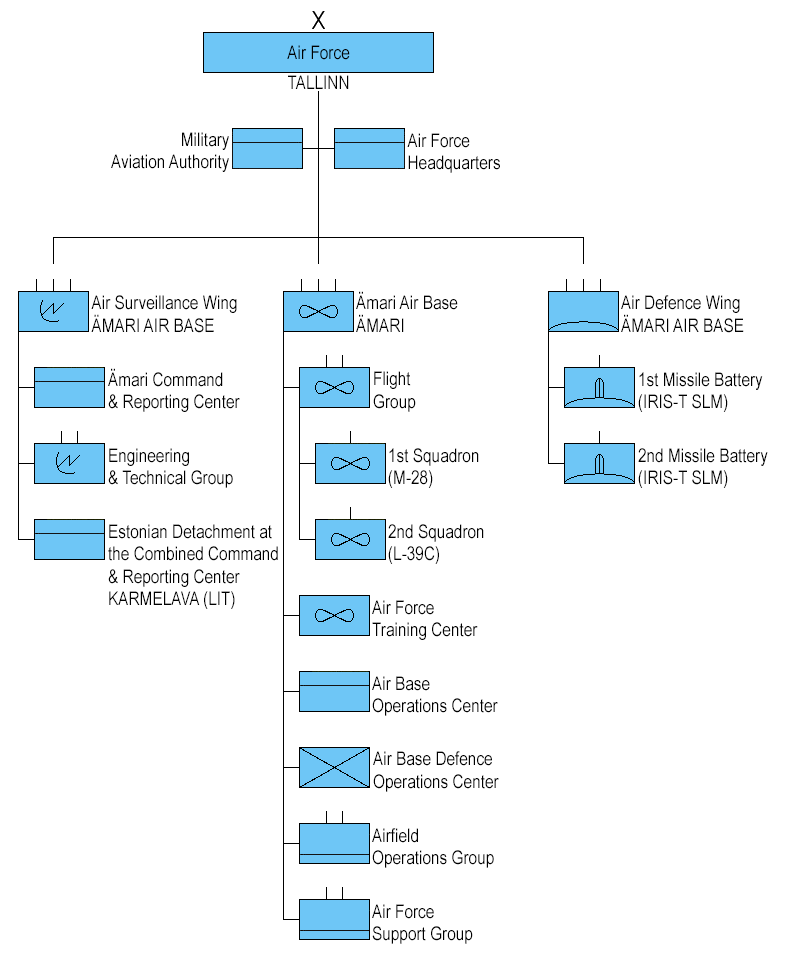
Estonian Air Force organization as of April 2026

Estonian Air Force locations
Air Base
Radar station with GM 403/400a
Radar station with AN/TPS-77(V)
- Estonian Air Force Headquarters

Estonian Air Force Headquarters was established 1994 in Tallinn.

The Estonian Air Force Headquarters is highest command of the Estonian Air Forces and represents the military concept-developing, command and executive structure providing Air Forces peacetime, crisis and wartime leadership in order to reach, maintain and increase, as required, the operational level of the military subordinated structures so that to be able to operate under authorized commands responsible for military operations planning and conduct.

- Ämari Air Base

The Air Base of the Estonian Air Force was established in 1997 at Ämari Air Base, a former Soviet air base.

Although the Estonian Air Force inherited a large number of former Soviet Air Force airfields in 1991 during the restoration of independence, most of them were disbanded within the early 90s due to non-existing need for such airfields. The Estonian Air Force has one active main air base in Ämari and occasionally uses a civilian airfield in Tallinn. The base houses the Base Operation Centre, Base Defence Operations Centre, a flight group, the Airfield Operations Group, Air Force Support Group and the Air Force Training Centre.

- Air Surveillance Wing

The Air Surveillance Wing (ASW) was established in 1998 at Ämari Air Base.

ASW is responsible for operating and maintaining the systems (primarily radars) to monitor all air movements in Estonian air space. Its Air Operations Control Centre reports to the Baltic Air Surveillance Network's Regional Airspace Surveillance Coordination Centre (RASCC) in Karmėlava, Lithuania, which in turn reports to CAOC Uedem of NATO's Integrated Air and Missile Defence System.

- Air Defence Wing

The Air Defence Wing (ADW) was established in 2023 at Ämari Air Base.

ADW is the main air defence unit of the Estonian Air Force. Its mission is ensuring the integrity of the airspace of Estonia by planning and executing active air defense operations. The ADW was formed mainly to operate Estonia's new IRIS-T SLM air defence systems. Other Estonian air defence weapons are operated by Air Defence Battalion of the Estonian Land Forces.

- Military Aviation Authority

The Military Aviation Authority is located in the Headquarters of the Estonian Defence Forces in Tallinn. It is part of the Estonian Air Force and its mission is to regulate and ensure the safety of military aviation in Estonia.

==== Current organization ====
- Air Force Commander
  - Air Force Headquarters, in Tallinn
    - Personnel Department
    - Intelligence Department
    - Operations and Training Department
    - Planning and Civil–Military Cooperation Department
    - Logistics Department
    - Communications and Command Systems Department
    - Support Services Department
  - Air Surveillance Wing, at Ämari Air Base
    - Ämari Command and Reporting Centre, at Ämari Air Base, reports to the Baltic Air Surveillance Network's Regional Airspace Surveillance Coordination Centre, in Karmėlava in Lithuania
    - Engineering and Technical Group, at Ämari Air Base
      - Radar Station, in Levalõpme, with GM 403
      - Radar Station, in Tõikamäe near Otepää, with GM 403
      - Radar Station, in Kalina, with GM 400a primary radar and a secondary radar
      - Radar Station, in Kõpu, with GM 400a (expected online in 2026)
      - Radar Station, in Kellavere, with AN/TPS-77(V)
      - Airport Surveillance Radar at Ämari Air Base, with GCA-2020
  - Ämari Air Base
    - Flight Group
      - 1st Squadron (M-28)
      - 2nd Squadron (L-39C)
    - Airfield Operations Group
      - Airfield Maintenance Squadron
      - Aircraft Maintenance Squadron
      - Ground Handling Squadron
      - Communications and Radio Navigation Squadron
      - Air Traffic Control Service
      - Rescue and Firefighting Service
      - Fuel Service
      - Aviation Meteorology and Flight Safety Service
    - Air Force Support Group
    - Air Base Operations Centre
      - Communications and Radio Navigation Squadron
      - Air Force Support Squadron
    - Air Base Defence Operations Centre
    - Air Force Training Centre
    - Tactical Air Control Party (TACP) Squadron
  - Air Defence Wing
    - Wing Headquarters
    - 1. Missile battery
    - 2. Missile battery
  - Military Aviation Authority
    - Headquarters
    - Flight Operations Department
      - Aviation Operations Inspector
      - Aircraft Inspector
    - Engineering Department
      - Infrastructure Inspector
  - Air Support Operations Centre

=== Ranks and insignia ===
NATO code	OF-10	OF-9	OF-8	OF-7	OF-6	OF-5	OF-4	OF-3	OF-2	OF-1
Estonian Air Force
Estonian Air Force		Kindral	Kindralleitnant	Kindralmajor	Brigaadikindral	Kolonel	Kolonelleitnant	Major	Kapten	Leitnant	Nooremleitnant	Lipnik
Estonian: Lühend		kin	kin-ltn	kin-mjr	brig-kin	kol	kol-ltn	mjr	kpt	ltn	n-ltn	lpn
English: Ranks		General	Lieutenant general	Major general	Brigadier general	Colonel	Lieutenant colonel	Major	Captain	First lieutenant	Second lieutenant	Ensign
English: Abbreviation		Gen	Lt Gen	Maj Gen	Brig Gen	Col	Lt Col	Maj	Capt	1st Lt	2d Lt	Ens

NATO code	OR-9		OR-8	OR-7	OR-6	OR-5	OR-4		OR-3	OR-2	OR-1
Estonian Air Force
Estonian Air Force	Ülemveebel	Staabiveebel	Vanemveebel	Veebel	Nooremveebel	Vanemseersant	Seersant	Nooremseersant		Kapral	Reamees
Estonian: Lühend	ü-vbl	st-vbl	v-vbl	vbl	n-vbl	v-srs	srs	n-srs		kpr	rms
English: Ranks	Chief Master Sergeant of the Air Force	Chief master sergeant	Senior master sergeant	Master sergeant	Technical sergeant	Staff sergeant	Sergeant	Sergeant		Senior airman	Airman
English: Abbreviation	CMSAF	CMSgt	SMSgt	MSgt	TSgt	SSgt	Sgt	Sgt		SrA	Amn

== Equipment ==
The modern Estonian Air Force has been rebuilding devastated military infrastructure since 1994 when the last Russian Ground Forces units left Estonia. Most of the funds were directed to the Ämari military airfield which was completed in 2011. Due to the lack of modern and developed military aviation infrastructure the Estonian Air Force development has been very slow. All aircraft are unarmed. In addition to upgrading and modernizing Ämari military airfield, the Estonian Air Force has embarked on an extensive program to upgrade and modernize airspace surveillance, making a number of significant purchases in recent years. The aim is to fully integrate with the NATO Integrated Air Defense System providing airspace surveillance with full national radar coverage and real-time reporting for the NATO Baltic Air Policing mission.

=== Aircraft ===
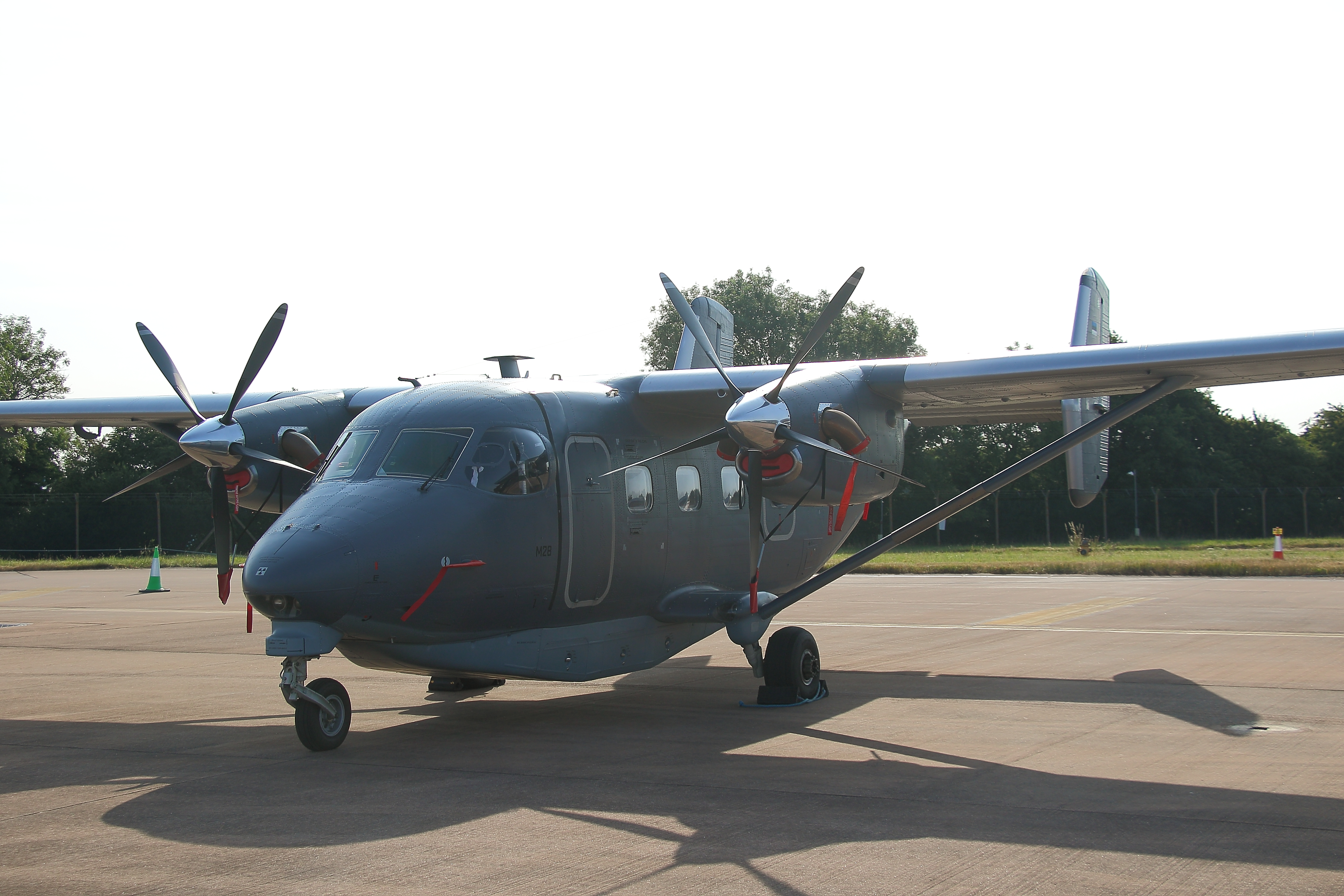
An Estonian PZL M28 Skytruck

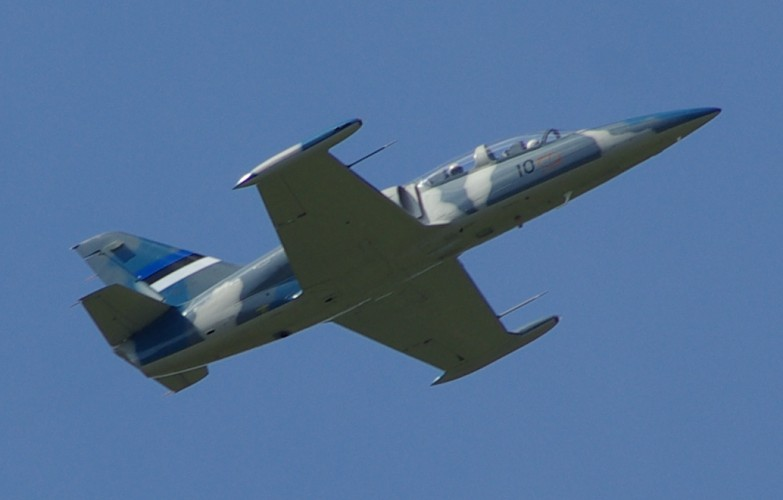
An Estonian Aero L-39C Albatros in flight

Aircraft	Origin	Type	Variant	In service	Notes
Transport
M28 Skytruck	Poland	Transport	C145A	2	Replaced two Antonov An-2s. Used for parachuting & JTAC (Joint Terminal Attack Controller) training. Also used for maritime surveillance in support of the Estonian Navy. Donated by the U.S.
Trainer aircraft
Aero L-39	Czechoslovakia	Jet trainer	L39C	2	Used for JTAC training. Leased from Aerohooldus OÜ.

Note: Three C-17 Globemaster IIIs are available through the Heavy Airlift Wing based in Hungary.

=== Air defense systems ===
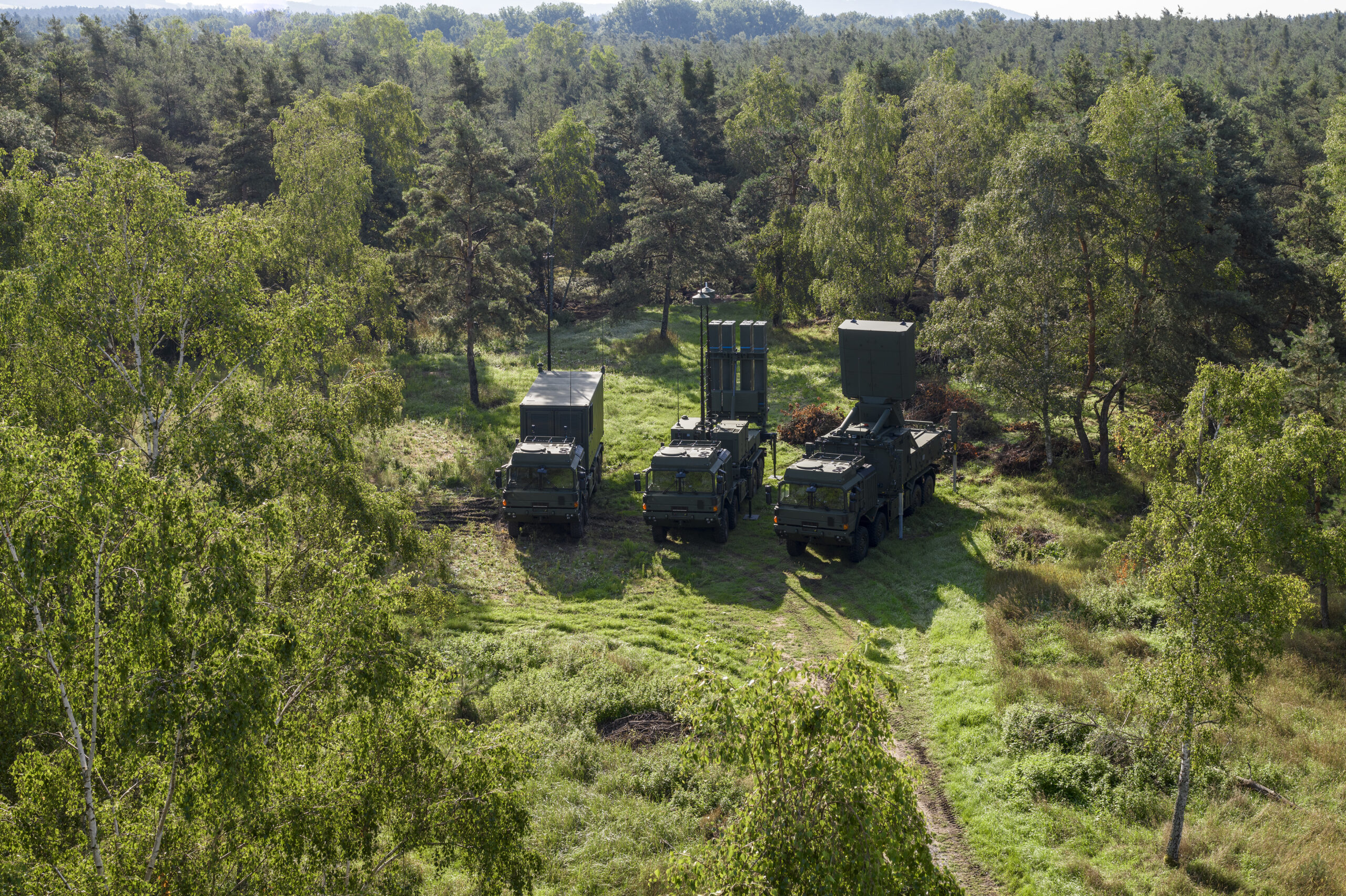
Estonian Air Force Air Defence Wing IRIS-T. TOC+TEL+RADAR

System	Type	Variant	In service	Notes
Missile air defense
IRIS-T SLM	Medium Extended Air Defense System	SLM	1 battery (+2 on order)	Jointly procured with Latvia in 2023.

=== Radar ===
Name	Origin	Type	In service	Notes
VERA-E	Czech Republic	Passive radar	1	Purchased in 2004.
Ground Master 403	France	Active electronically scanned array	2	Two radars purchased in 2009. At one point around 2012, these were mounted or were planned to be mounted on Sisu E13TP vehicles. Installed in fixed radar station position at Muhu island in 2013, and in Tõikamäe, Valga County, in 2015. To be upgraded to become similar as the 400a radar by 2027. After these updates all four major fixed radar stations of Estonia are identical, and the large surveillance radar capabilities of Estonia will be complete (as planned in 2025 with 4 fixed stations operating GM 400a radars).
Ground Master 400a (400 alpha)	France	Active electronically scanned array	1 (+1 on order)	Two ordered in 2023. One (Kalina in Ida-Viru County) became operational November 2025, with the second (Kõpu on Hiiumaa) expected operational in 2026.
AN/TPS-77	United States	Passive electronically scanned array	1	Bought 2003. Modernized in 2014.
GCA-2020	United States	Precision approach radar	1	Based at Ämari Air Base.

In addition to these radars, the 16th Air Defence Battalion of the Estonian Land Forces has 4 or 5 Giraffe AMB radars (these radars, even though being air surveillance radars, are under Land Forces', not Air Forces', inventory). Also small Hungarian man-portable passive radars are used for airspace and border surveillance (it is not clear under which organization's inventory these are).

As of 2025 a procurement program for mobile radars is ongoing in the EDF.

Before acquiring better radars, the Air Surveillance Wing (founded in 1998) used civilian radar and one P-37 Soviet radar (P-37 on display at Estonian Aviation Museum). The modern AN/TPS-77 radar at Kellavere began operations in 2003, marking the beginning of acquisition of better radar equipment for Estonia.

== Incidents and accidents ==
- On 12 July 1935, an airplane crashed. The two crew members were killed and the plane was destroyed.
- On 5 September 1929, an airplane crashed. The two crew members were killed and the plane was destroyed.

== See also ==
- Police and Border Guard Aviation Group
- Estonian Aviation Museum
- Estonian Aviation Academy
