= Estonian Air Force Service Cross =

Estonian military award

- Type: Service Medal
- Presented by: Commander of the Estonian Air Force
- Status: currently awarded

The Estonian Air Force Service Cross (Estonian: Õhuväe teeneterist) is an Estonian Air Force recognition for active duty and combat services rendered in the interests of the Republic of Estonia.

== Description ==
The medal was established for the purpose of recognizing persons who have outstanding merits before the Air Force. The medal is a cone made of silver metal with concave branches at the ends and a silver eagle holding a triangular shield with the sword of the right foot between the claws of the right leg and the claws of the Estonian leg with the claws of the left leg. There are 3 classes.

== Qualifications for the award ==
A medal may also be awarded to Estonian citizens who have supported the development of the Air Force. The Commander of the Air Force Staff makes a proposal for the award of a medal to the Council of Merit of the Air Force. The decision to award a medal of merit shall be made by the council of merit and is formalized by a directive of the Commander of the Air Force. A medal of merit includes a certificate which has the given name and surname of the recipient of the medal of merit, rank, type and number of medal of merit, date of issue and basis for award.

== Classes ==
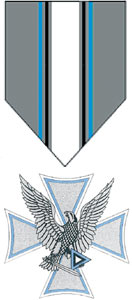
1st Class Service Cross

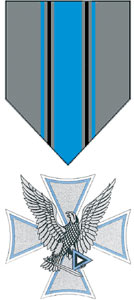
2nd Class Service Cross

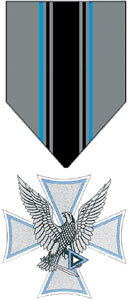
3rd Class Service Cross

== Notable recipients ==
- Major Benno Leesik, Commander of the Defense League 08.06.1999 - 25.03.2006
