= Buturlinovka (air base) =

Airport in Voronezh Oblast, Russia

Buturlinovka
- Buturlinovsky District, Voronezh Oblast in Russia
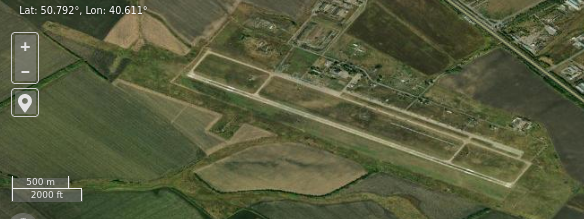
- Satellite imagery of Buturlinovka air base

Site information
- Type: Air Base
- Owner: Ministry of Defence
- Operator: Russian Air Force
- Controlled by: 6th Air and Air Defence Forces Army

Location
- Shown within Voronezh Oblast Buturlinovka (Russia)
- Coordinates: 50°47′30″N 40°36′40″E

Site history
- In use: -present

Airfield information
- Elevation: 154 metres (505 ft) AMSL
Runways
Direction	Length and surface
11/29	2,500 metres (8,202 ft) Concrete

Buturlinovka is a military air base of the Russian Air Force in Buturlinovsky District, Voronezh Oblast, Russia. It is located 4 kilometers (2.5 mi) south of the town of Buturlinovka, and has housing for around one dozen fighter aircraft.

== History ==
From 1952 the base housed the 186th Training Aviation Regiment (186-й учебный авиационный полк (186-й уап)) from the 1970s flying the MiG-21. In October 1990 the regiment became a Instructional Shturmovik Aviation Regiment operating 45 Sukhoi Su-25 attack aircraft. It was then was renamed the 899th Orshansky Guards Assault Aviation Regiment of the 16th Air Army operating Su-25s until the unit disbanded on 1 December 2009, after which the airbase was left vacant.

It remained an air commandant's office until June 2014, when it was announced that the 899th Orshansky Guards would be re-established by 2017.

During 2011, the Mikoyan MiG-29's stationed at Kursk Vostochny Airport were temporarily based at Buturlinovka for a year due to runway repairs. From December 2013, the airfield temporarily accommodated the 47th Voronezh Mixed Aviation Regiment from Voronezh Malshevo during the repair of the runway.

From April 2022 some Russian military aircraft deployed to bases in Belarus moved to this base as part of the 2022 Russian invasion of Ukraine such as the 277th Bomber Aviation Regiment which deployed to Lida (air base) from their home base at Komsomolsk-on-Amur Airport.

== See also ==
- List of military airbases in Russia
