= Riivo Valge =

Estonian military officer

- Born: 24 September 1975 (age 51); Estonian SSR, Soviet Union
- Military career
- Allegiance: Estonia
- Branch: Estonian Air Force
- Service years: 1998–present
- Rank: Brigadier General
- Commands: Estonian Air Force

Riivo Valge (born 24 September 1975) is an Estonian military officer and current (started 18 June 2025) commander of the Estonian Air Force.

In 2012 he was the commander of Estonian Air Force's Headquarters. From 2018 to 2019 he was the commander of Estonian Air Force.

In 2001 he was awarded with Order of the Cross of the Eagle's silver cross.
