= Aimar Altosaar =

Estonian politician (born 1959)

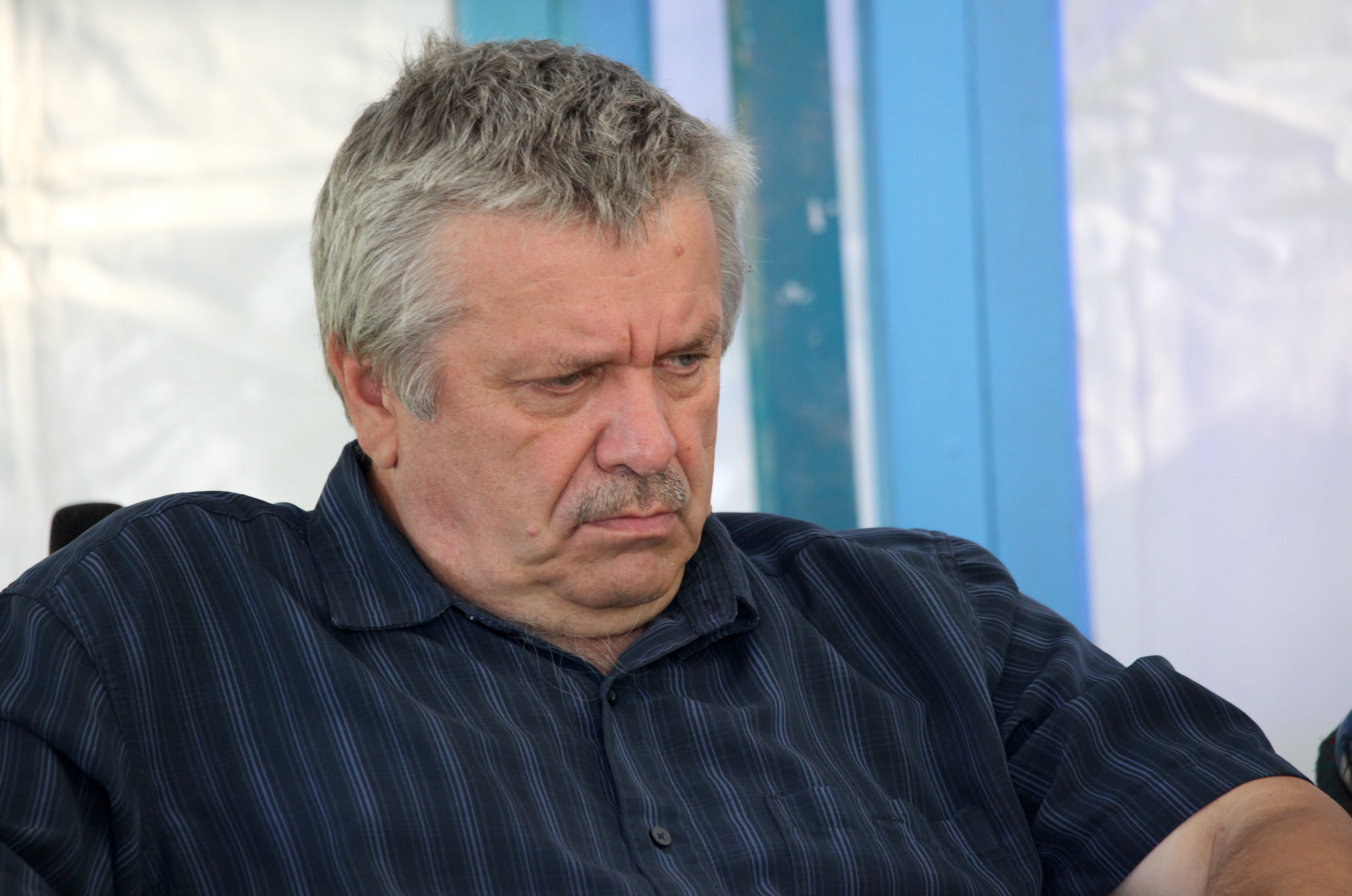
Aimar Altosaar at the Opinion Festival 2021 in Paide, Estonia

Aimar Altosaar (born 1959) is an Estonian sociologist, journalist and politician. He was a member of IX Riigikogu. He was the Secretary General of the Pro Patria Union party from 1995 until 1999 and again from 2004 until 2006.

Altosaar was born Antsla. He graduated from Tartu State University in 1982 with a degree in social psychology and a postgraduate degree from the Estonian Academy of Sciences in 1988.
