= Rembates Parish =

Administrative unit in Latvia

- parish of Latvia
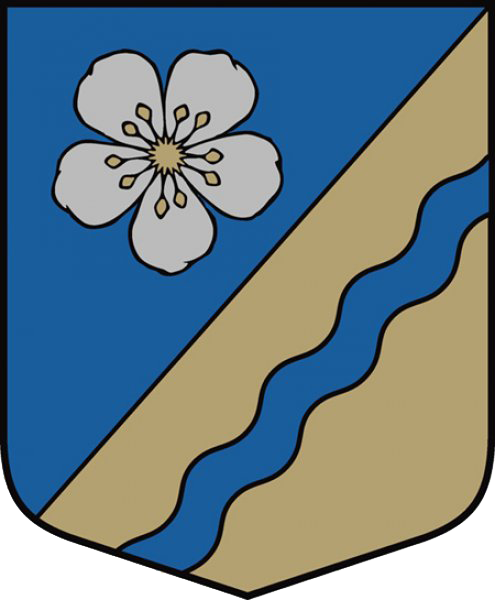
- Coat of arms

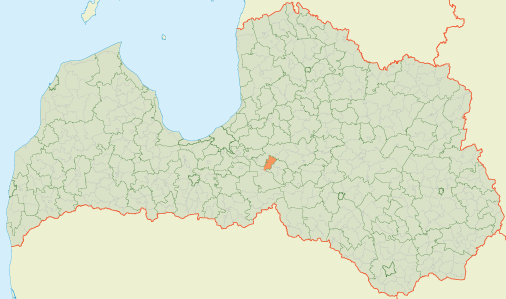
- Coordinates: 56°46′51″N 24°49′39″E
- Country: Latvia

Population (1 January 2026)
  - Total: 1,074

Rembate parish is an administrative unit of Ogre Municipality in the Vidzeme region of Latvia. From 2009 until 2021, it was part of the former Ķegums Municipality.
