= Lielvārde Air Base =

Air base in Latvia

Lielvārde Air Base
- Rembate Parish, Ogre Municipality in Latvia
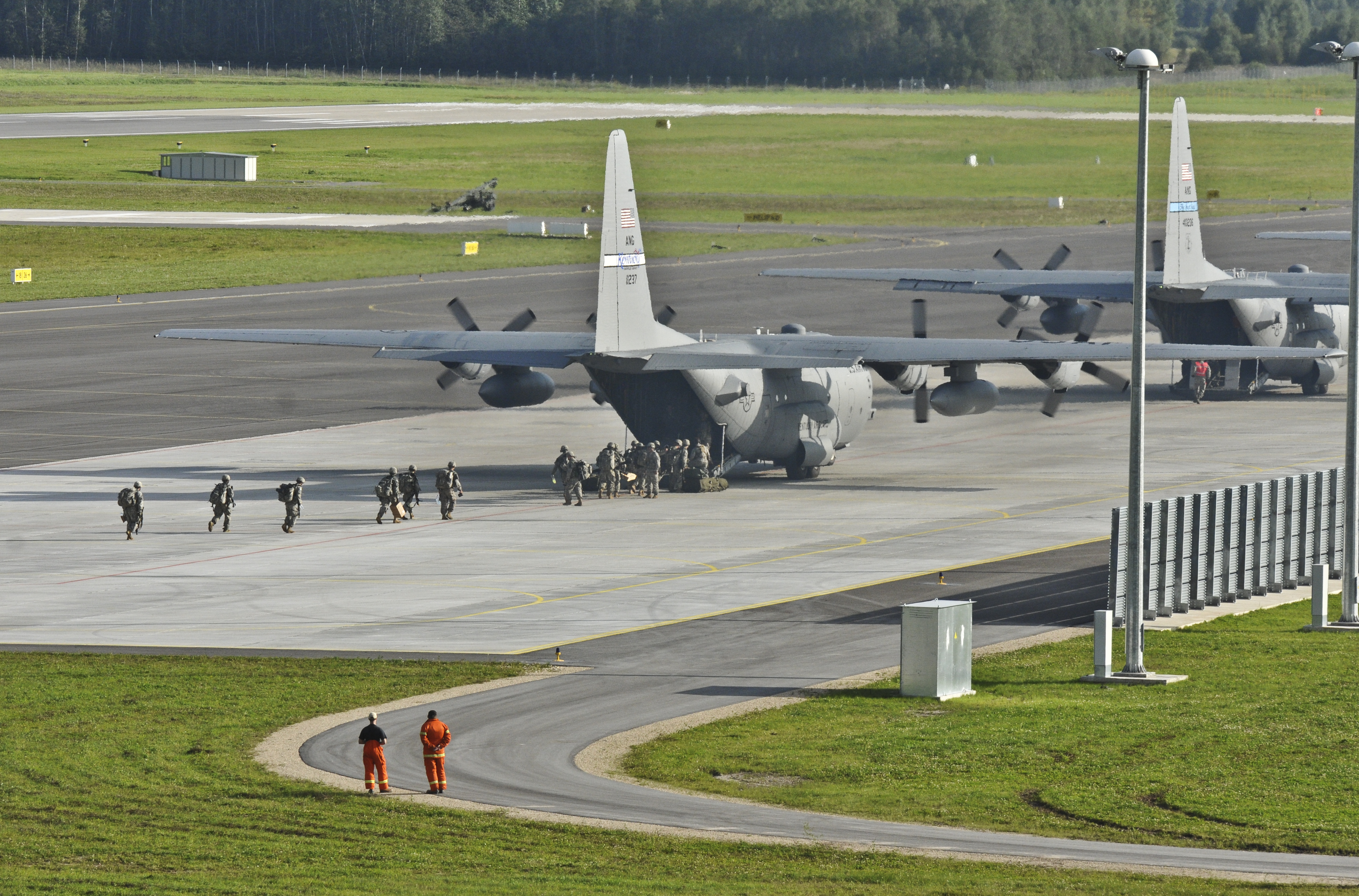

Site information
- Owner: Latvian National Armed Forces
- Operator: Latvian Air Force

Location
- Shown within Latvia
- Coordinates: 56°46′42″N 024°51′12″E

Site history
- In use: 1969 - present

Airfield information
- Identifiers: ICAO: EVGA
- Elevation: 61 metres (200 ft) AMSL
Runways
Direction	Length and surface
18/36	2,500 metres (8,202 ft) Concrete

Lielvārde Air Force Base (ICAO: EVGA) is a military air base in Rembate Parish, Ogre Municipality in the Vidzeme region of Latvia. It is located 7 kilometres (4 mi) north of Lielvārde and southeast of Riga.

== History ==
Lielvārde was built in 1969 for a Soviet attack aircraft regiment.

In spring 1980, the 899th Fighter Aviation Regiment, part of the 1st Guards Stalingradsko-Berlinskaya Red Banner Fighter Aviation Division, 15th Air Army, moved from Riga-Rumbula in Latvia to Lielvārde. In July 1981 the regiment was redesignated as a Fighter-Bomber Aviation Regiment, and shifted to the 39th Fighter-Bomber Aviation Division, still within the Air Forces, but now within the Air Forces of the Baltic Military District, as they had become in 1981. The 899th Regiment was withdrawn to Buturlinovka, Voronezh Oblast, in June–July 1993.

The base was transferred from Russia to Latvia in 1994. It now forms the core of operations for the Latvian Air Force.

Between 2007 and 2014 the air base underwent a major modernization, including the construction of a new administrative headquarters building opened in 2009, and a state-of-the-art runway and taxiways. In September 2016, Latvia's Defence Minister Raimonds Bergmanis said infrastructure at the air base was "being constructed and modernized at a fast pace" in preparation for a Canadian-led multi-national NATO battalion expected to deploy to Latvia in the spring of 2017.

In February 2022, 20 Boeing AH-64D/E Apaches from 1st Battalion (Attack Reconnaissance), 3rd Aviation Regiment, 12th Combat Aviation Brigade, United States Army Aviation Branch, United States Army arrived for NATO exercises.

According to ADS-B tracking data, beginning on April 13, 2022, the airport received multiple visits by three LM-100J aircraft (N67AU, N96MG, N71 km) belonging to the American company Pallas Aviation. By December 31, 2023, these flights numbered at least 77, almost all originating at Ramstein Air Base in Germany.

Due to runway work at Ämari Air Base, a detachment of five German Air Force Eurofighters arrived at Lielvārde on February 26, 2024, for a four month long deployment to support the NATO enhanced Air Policing in the region. This is the first time Lielvārde Air Base has been used for Baltic Air Policing.

== See also ==
- Ämari Air Base
- Šiauliai Air Base
