= Ämari Air Base =

Military airbase in Estonia

Ämari Air Base
- Keila, Harju County in Estonia
- Insignia of Ämari Air Base

Site information
- Owner: Estonian Defence Forces
- Operator: Estonian Air Force

Location
- Shown within Estonia Ämari (Europe)
- Coordinates: 59°15′44″N 024°13′07″E

Site history
- In use: 1945–present

Airfield information
- Identifiers: ICAO: EEEI
- Elevation: 20 metres (66 ft) AMSL
Runways
Direction	Length and surface
06/24	2,750 metres (9,022 ft) Asphalt/Concrete

Ämari Air Base (Note: Also given in references as Suurküla (original Estonian name), Vasalemma, Emari, Suurkyul, Shuurkyul, and Shuurkul - last forms of the Estonian names are derivates of names Russian-speaking military personnel used when it was used by the Soviet military.) (ICAO: EEEI) is a military airbase in Harjumaa, Estonia, located 7 km (4.3 mi) south of Lake Klooga and 20 nautical miles (37 km; 23 mi) southwest of Tallinn.

The base was opened in 1945.

== History ==
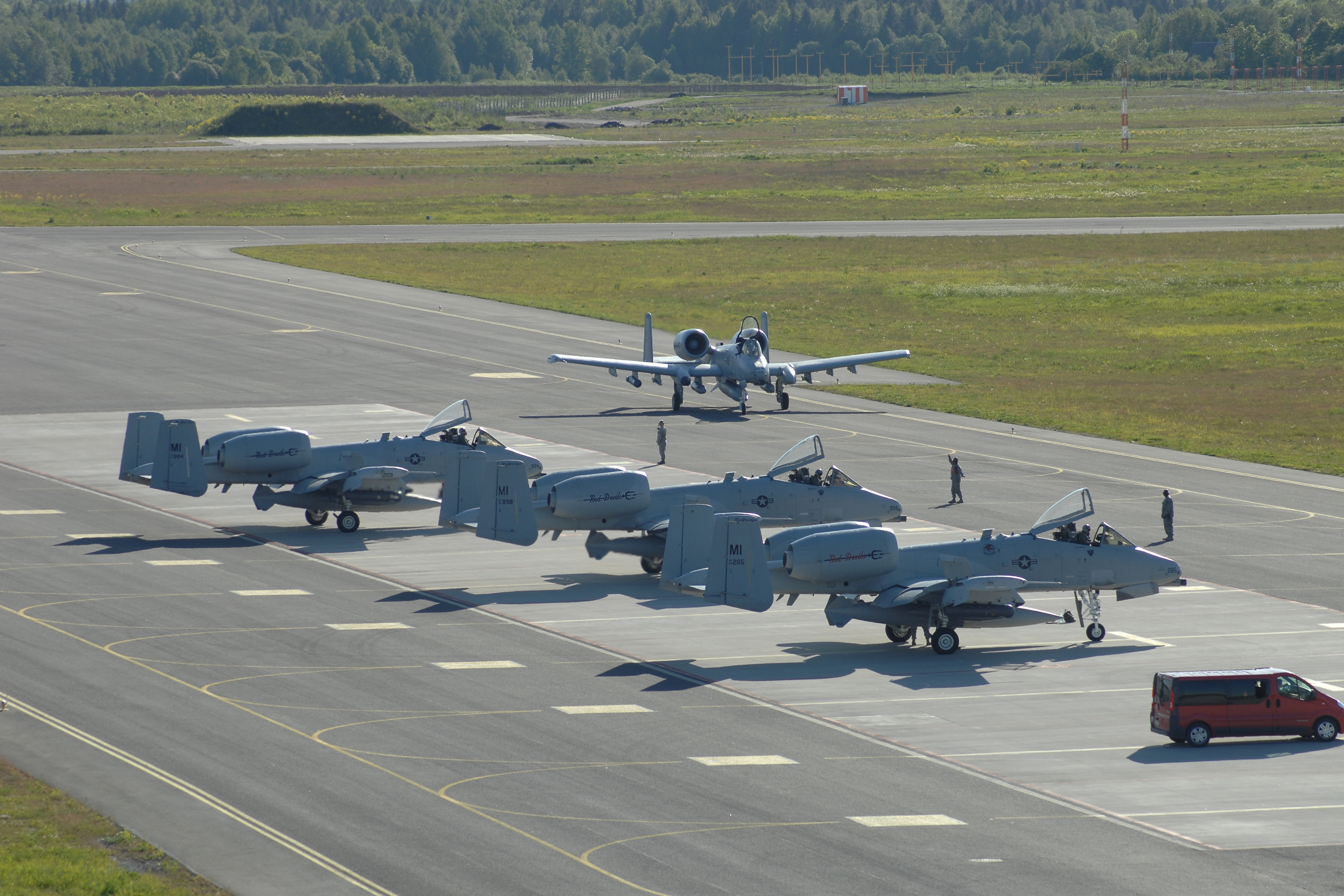
A-10s of the Michigan Air National Guard at Ämari Air Base in 2012.

Ämari Air Base was built between 1940–1952 under an agreement signed by the Estonian SSR and the Soviet Union. In 1945, the USSR Ministry of Defense established a naval reserve airfield of its Baltic Fleet there, where the amphibious seaplanes of the 69th Long-Range Reconnaissance Regiment Catalina PBY-5A and the escort fighters Yak-9P began to be based. It became the main base for the units located in Ämari in 1952.

In November 1967, the 88th Aviation Regiment of Fighter-Bombers was formed at the airfield, remaining until August 1984, after which it was relocated to Kanatovo airfield, at Kirovograd, Ukraine. From 1967 to 1973 the regiment flew the MiG-17, from 1970 to 1980 - the MiG-21PFM, and since 1980 - the MiG-27D (K).

In 1977, the 321st Fighter-Bomber Aviation Regiment was formed at the airfield. The regiment operated Su-7B aircraft. In 1987, the regiment was retrained on the Su-24 and transferred to the 132nd Bomber Aviation Division. In 1994, the regiment was disbanded at the airfield.

During the Vietnam War the base was a training facility for Soviet pilots to fly MiG-15, MiG-15bis, Mig-17 and MiG-19 aircraft before deployment to North Vietnam as "military advisor pilots" and deployment to Arab countries during the wars against Israel. After 1975, the units replaced their obsolete MiGs for Sukhoi planes. Later, Ämari was home to 321 and/or 170 MShAP (321st and/or 170th Naval Shturmovik Aviation Regiment) flying Su-24 aircraft. After the dissolution of the Soviet Union, the Russian Air Force continued to administer the base until it was handed over to Estonia in 1996.

The Estonian Air Force Air Surveillance Wing was created in January 1998 and is located at the base.

After Estonia's accession to the North Atlantic Treaty Organization (NATO) in 2004, the base was made NATO interoperable. NATO aircraft have been stationed at the base since 2014.

== Current use ==
Video: Three days after the start of the Russian invasion of Ukraine, F-35s from RAF Lakenheath arrive at Ämari

Since April 2014, the base has hosted NATO Baltic Air Policing patrols. On 30 April 2014 this mission began with the arrival of four Royal Danish Air Force F-16s.

During 2015 it was announced that the aerial assets from the American Operation Atlantic Resolve would be based there.

In September 2015, Lockheed Martin F-22 Raptor fighters visited Ämari.

As of 2017, the US has invested over 32 million dollars into Ämari after the occupation of Crimea in 2014, with 13.9 million dollars to be invested in 2018.

From April 2023, RAF Eurofighter Typhoon jets of IX Squadron were based at Ämari, as part of the Quick Reaction Force for Operation Azotize, Nato's Baltic Air Policing mission, replacing the Luftwaffe's Taktisches Luftwaffengeschwader 71 "Richthofen" squadron (Typhoon).

Ämari Airbase was renovated in 2024 at a cost of €18.5 million, €12 million of which was contributed by Luxembourg.

During the renovations, the Baltic Air Policing mission was temporarily stationed at Lielvārde in Latvia.

== See also ==
- Lielvārde Air Base
- Šiauliai Air Base
