= List of airports in Latvia =

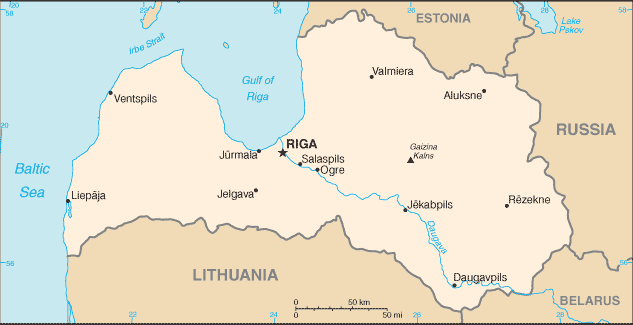
Map of Latvia

This is a list of airports in Latvia, sorted by location.

Latvia (Latvian: Latvija), officially the Republic of Latvia (Latvijas Republika), is a country in the Baltic region of Northern Europe. It is bordered to the north by Estonia, to the south by Lithuania, to the east by the Russian Federation, and to the southeast by Belarus. Across the Baltic Sea to the west lies Sweden. The capital of Latvia is Riga. The local time is GMT+2 (GMT+3 DST).

Riga International Airport is the only major airport in Latvia, carrying around 5 million passengers annually. It is the largest airport in the Baltic states and has direct flights to over 80 destinations in 30 countries. It is also the main hub of airBaltic.

In the recent years airBaltic operated also in Liepāja International Airport as well as Ventspils International Airport but operations in both of these airports were soon ceased. In 2017 airBaltic started to fly to Liepāja International Airport again. As of 2019, airBaltic flies between Riga and Liepāja three times weekly in winter and five times weekly in summer.

Currently there are plans for further development in several regional airports, including Jūrmala Airport, Liepāja, Ventspils as well as Daugavpils International Airport.

== Airports ==
Names shown in bold indicate airports with scheduled passenger service on commercial airlines.

City served / Location	ICAO	IATA	Airport name	Coordinates
**Civil aerodromes**				
Adaži	EVAD		Adaži Airfield	57°05′54″N 024°15′58″E
Daugavpils	EVDA	DGP	Daugavpils International Airport (under development)	55°56′33″N 026°40′06″E
Liepāja	EVLA	LPX	Liepāja International Airport	56°31′03″N 021°05′49″E
Rezekne	EVNA		Rezekne Airport	56.557981°N 27.219379°E
Riga	EVRA	RIX	**Riga International Airport**	56°55′25″N 023°58′16″E
Riga	EVRS		Spilve Airport	56°59′28″N 024°04′30″E
Tukums	EVJA	QUJ	Jūrmala Airport	56°56′32″N 023°13′26″E
Ventspils	EVVA	VNT	Ventspils International Airport	57°21′28″N 021°32′39″E
**Military air bases**				
Jelgava	EVEA		Jelgava Air Base (non functional)	56°40′22″N 023°40′45″E
Jēkabpils	EVKA		Jēkabpils Air Base (non functional)	56°32′05″N 025°53′33″E
Lielvārde	EVGA		Lielvārde Air Base	56°46′42″N 024°51′14″E
Riga	EVRC		Rumbula Air Base (non functional)	56°53′00″N 024°13′36″E
Vaiņode	EVFA		Vainode Air Base (non functional)	56°24′20″N 021°53′13″E
Valmiera			Liepas Air Base (non functional)	57°23′12″N 025°30′30″E
**Small airports (Heliports)**				
Lielvārde	EVSM		M-Sola Heliport	56°39′56″N 024°54′11″E
Riga	EVOC		Old City Heliport	56°57′24″N 24°5′45″E
Cēsis	EVCA		Vidzemes aeroklubs	57°19′41.7″N 025°19′14.6″E
Nākotne Heliport	EVHN		Nākotne Heliport	56°36′28″N 023°27′30″E
Degumnieki			Degumnieku lidlauks	56°48′17″N 026°46′17″E

== See also ==
- Latvian Air Force
- Transport in Latvia
- List of largest airports in the Baltic states
- List of airports by ICAO code: EH-EY#EV - Latvia
- Wikipedia:WikiProject Aviation/Airline destination lists: Europe#Latvia
