= 27th Air Defense Corps =

- Active: 1960–1994
- Country: Soviet Union; Russia
- Branch: Soviet Air Defense Forces; Russian Air Defense Forces
- Type: Air defence
- Part of: 6th Independent Air Defense Army (1986–1994)
- Garrison/HQ: Riga

The 27th Air Defense Corps (Russian: 27-й корпус ПВО) was a corps of the Soviet Air Defense Forces and briefly the Russian Air Defense Forces.

Formed in 1960 from the Baltic Air Defense Corps, the corps provided air defense for the Latvian and Lithuanian Soviet Socialist Republics. In the early 1970s it took over responsibility for Kaliningrad Oblast as well. Initially part of the 2nd Independent Air Defense Army, it was subordinated to the Air Forces of the Baltic Military District from the late 1970s to the mid-1980s. In 1986 the corps became part of the 6th Independent Air Defense Army, and was disbanded in 1994 after the Russian withdrawal from the Baltics following the end of the Cold War and the Dissolution of the Soviet Union.

== History ==
In the summer of 1954, the air defense units in the Baltic states became part of the new Baltic Air Defense Corps of the Soviet Air Defense Forces, headquartered in Riga. In early 1957, the Baltic Air Defense Corps and the Air Defense Directorate of the Baltic Fleet were merged to form the Separate Baltic Air Defense Corps, which also included the 14th Air Defense Division at Tallinn. During the Air Defense Forces reorganization in the spring and summer of 1960, the corps became the 27th Air Defense Corps, part of the 2nd Independent Air Defense Army at Minsk, still with headquarters in Riga. The 27th Corps controlled air defense on the territory of the Latvian and Lithuanian Soviet Socialist Republics. It included two interceptor regiments: the 54th Guards at Vaiņode and the 372nd at Daugavpils. The 158th Guards Anti-Aircraft Rocket Brigade was formed in 1961 at Liepāja with the corps. In 1967 and 1968, the 205th Anti-Aircraft Rocket Brigade was formed from a regiment of the corps at Riga. The 77th Anti-Aircraft Rocket Brigade was formed around the same time from a regiment at Ventspils. The 85th Anti-Aircraft Rocket Brigade was formed at Kaunas around the same time.

In 1973 it took over responsibility for Kaliningrad Oblast when the 3rd Air Defense Division was disbanded with its units directly subordinated to the headquarters of the 27th Corps. The corps gained the 689th Guards Fighter Aviation Regiment at Nivenskoye, the 169th Anti-Aircraft Rocket Brigade at Neman, the 69th Anti-Aircraft Rocket Brigade at Baltiysk, the 183rd Guards Anti-Aircraft Rocket Brigade at Gvardeysk, and the 298th Radio-Technical Regiment at Zelenogradsk. In August 1974, the 298th became the 81st Radio-Technical Brigade, before relocating to Pereslavlskoye in 1977. In 1975, two radio-technical regiments from the corps merged to form the 80th Radio-Technical Brigade at Tukums. Between 1978 and 1985, the corps was subordinated to the Baltic Military District. At the same time, its fighter aviation regiments were transferred to the Air Forces of the district. In early 1986, it became part of the 6th Independent Air Defense Army. At this time, the corps included two interceptor regiments: the 54th Guards with 38 Su-27s, and the 689th Guards with 36 Su-27s, as well as seven surface-to-air missile brigades: the 69th, 77th, 85th, 158th Guards, 169th, 183rd Guards and 205th, and two radio-technical brigades operating radar for the corps: the 80th and 81st. In 1987, the 85th Brigade was disbanded with its personnel transferred to the 466th Brigade. The latter had been recently formed at Vilnius from a regiment. The 85th was replaced by the mobilization 427th Anti-Aircraft Rocket Regiment, whose headquarters was formed in Leningrad Oblast with the 6th Independent Air Defense Army.

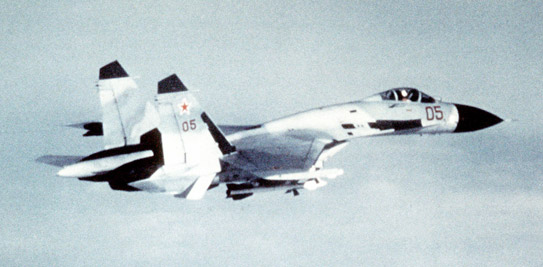
A Sukhoi Su-27 of the type flown by the corps' interceptor regiments in the late 1980s

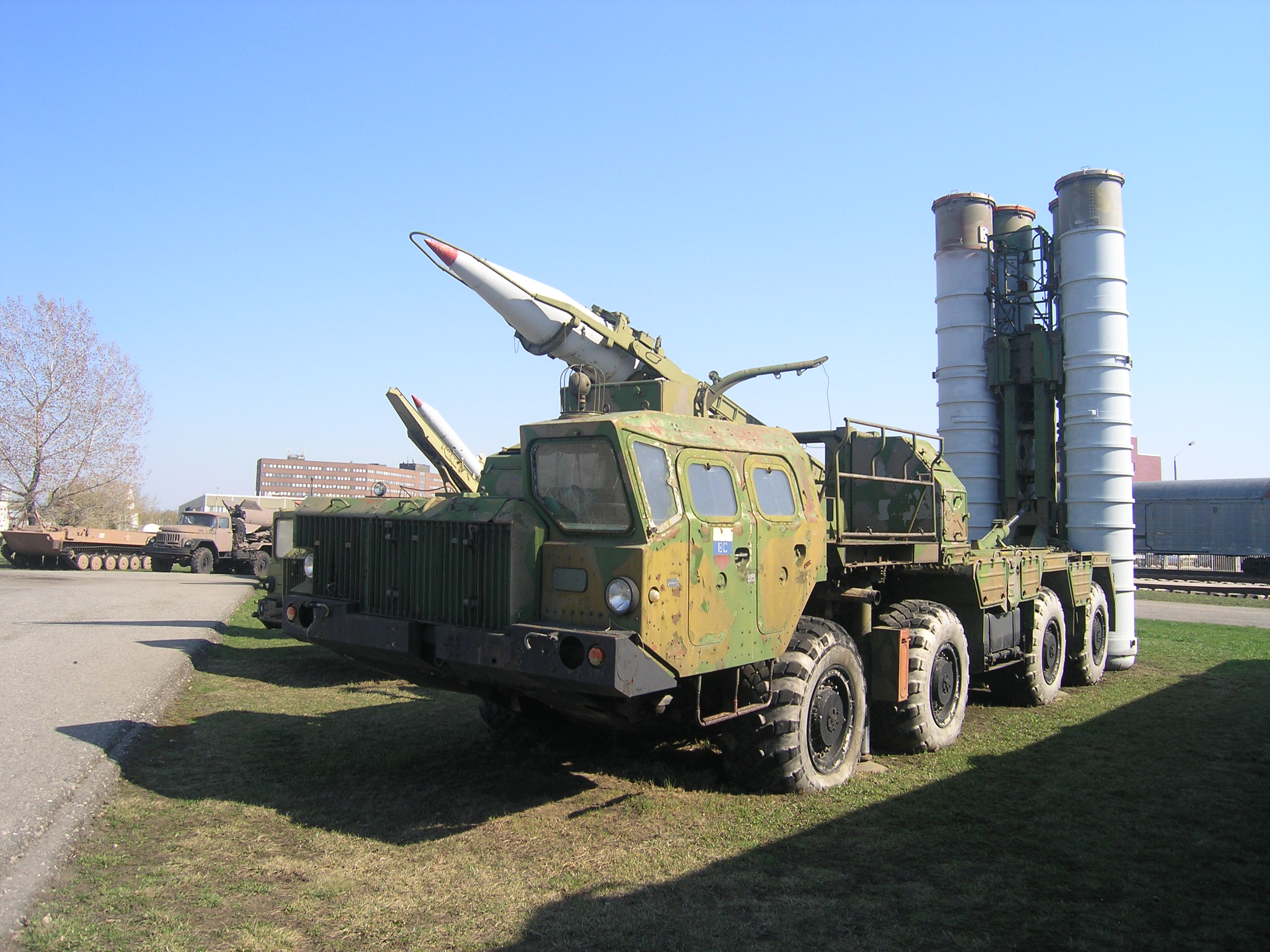
An S-300PS launcher of the type operated by the corps' SAM units in the late 1980s

In 1989, the 69th Brigade became the 365th Anti-Aircraft Rocket Regiment, which was disbanded in 1991. In the fall of 1990, the 54th Guards was disbanded with its lineage transferred to the 594th Training Fighter Aviation Regiment. The 77th Brigade disbanded in December 1992, and the 205th Brigade disbanded in 1993. In early 1993, the equipment and personnel of the 158th Brigade were withdrawn to Leningrad Oblast, where they merged with the 82nd Anti-Aircraft Rocket Brigade to form the 500th Guards Anti-Aircraft Rocket Regiment. Around the same time, the 466th Brigade and its S-300 missiles were withdrawn to Smolensk Oblast, where they inherited the lineage of the disbanded 493rd Guards Anti-Aircraft Rocket Regiment to become the 284th Guards Anti-Aircraft Rocket Regiment. In 1994, the corps headquarters was disbanded. On 26 July of that year, the 689th Guards transferred to the Air and Air Defense Forces of the Baltic Fleet.
