= Baltic Military District =

- The district in 1991 (marked in red)
- Active: 11 July 1940 – 22 June 1941; 9 July 1945 – September 1991
- Country: Soviet Union
- Type: Military district
- Headquarters: Riga
- Engagements: World War II

Commanders
- Notable commanders: Hovhannes Bagramyan; Aleksandr Gorbatov

The Baltic Military District (Russian: Прибалтийский военный округ (ПрибВО)) was a military district of the Soviet Armed Forces in the Baltic states, formed shortly before the German invasion during World War II. After the end of the war the Kaliningrad Oblast was added to the District's control in 1946, and the territory of Estonia was transferred back to the Baltic Military District from the Leningrad Military District in 1956.

The Baltic Military District was disbanded after the fall of the Soviet Union in 1991 and reorganised into the North Western Group of Forces, which ceased to exist following the withdrawal of all Russian troops from Estonia, Latvia and Lithuania on 1 September 1994.

== World War II ==
=== First formation (1940–1941) ===
The Baltic Military District was first created by order of the USSR People's Commissar of Defence on 11 July 1940, under the command of Colonel General Aleksandr Loktionov. Its headquarters was formed from the headquarters of the disbanded Kalinin Military District in Riga on 13 August. This was after the Soviet occupation of the Baltic States but before they were forcibly legally absorbed into the Soviet Union. It controlled troops on the territory of the Latvian and Lithuanian Soviet Socialist Republics as well as the western part of Kalinin Oblast. On 17 August 1940 it became the Baltic Special Military District, changing its boundaries to control troops on the territory of Estonian, Latvian, and Lithuanian Soviet Socialist Republics. The western part of Kalinin Oblast was transferred to control of the Moscow Military District.

The district was created in order to strengthen the defense of the northwestern borders of the Soviet Union and to protect the approaches to Moscow and Leningrad from German-controlled East Prussia. The district troops closely cooperated with the Baltic Fleet. In August, the district included the 8th and 11th Armies, soon augmented in September by the transformation of the Estonian, Latvian, and Lithuanian armies into the Red Army's 22nd, 24th, and 29th Territorial Rifle Corps respectively. However they were notoriously disloyal to the occupying Soviet Union and its army and thus defected in large numbers to the opposing side after June 1941.

In 1940 and 1941 the district formed new units, including two mechanized corps (the 3rd and 12th), as well as local and republic military commissariats. Loktionov was replaced by Lieutenant General Fyodor Kuznetsov in December 1940. In May 1941, the headquarters of the 27th Army was formed by the district. At the same time, the district headquarters developed a plan for responding to a German invasion, and ordered that troops be brought to combat readiness on 18 June. However, by 22 June, when Operation Barbarossa, the German invasion of the Soviet Union, began, the district's newly formed units were not completely manned. When the war broke out, it included six rifle corps in the 8th, 11th, and 27th Armies, the 5th Airborne Corps, the 3rd and 12th Mechanized Corps, and six fortified regions. According to the district's plan, the 8th, 11th, and 27th Armies were to cooperate with the Baltic Fleet in defending the coast from Haapsalu to Palanga, focusing on the defense of the 300-kilometer border with East Prussia.

On 22 June 1941 the District consisted of the:

- 8th Army (10th, 11th Rifle Corps, 12th Mechanized Corps)
- 11th Army (16th, 29th Territorial Rifle Corps, 3rd Mechanized Corps)
- 27th Army (22nd and 24th Territorial Rifle Corps)
- 5th Airborne Corps (9th, 10th and 201st Parachutist Brigades)
- and other smaller formations and units.

3rd Mechanized Corps was located within the district at Vilnius.

Air Forces comprised the 4th, 6th, 7th, 8th and 57th Mixed Aviation Divisions, two further regiments, and a last regiment in the process of formation earmarked for transporting 5th Airborne Corps.

Overall, just before the start of Operation Barbarossa on 22 June 1941, the Baltic special military district had a total of 25 divisions:

- 19 rifle (5th, 10th, 11th, 16th, 23rd, 33rd, 48th, 67th, 90th, 125th, 126th, 128th, 179th, 180th, 181st, 182nd, 183rd, 184th, 188th),
- 4 armoured (2nd, 5th, 23rd, 28th Tank Division) and
- 2 motorized (84th and 202nd)

Besides these, there were also a single rifle brigade (3rd) and the three Territorial Rifle Corps (22nd, 24th, 29th), with each corps having two divisions (these had the 180th, 182nd, 181st, 183rd, 179th, 184th Rifle Divisions respectively).

On 22 June, the district headquarters was used to form the headquarters of the Northwestern Front. Parts of the former district headquarters remained in Riga, led by the deputy district commander, evacuating to Valga on 1 July and then to Novgorod, where they were disbanded.

=== Second formation on paper (1943–1944) ===
The Baltic Military District was formed for a second time in accordance with a directive of the General Staff of the Red Army on 30 October 1943, although its assigned territory (the Lithuanian, Latvian, and Estonian Soviet Socialist Republics) was at that time still under German occupation. Its headquarters was formed in Vyshny Volochyok from that of the 58th Army, under the command of Major General Nikolay Biyazi. The district was disbanded on 23 March 1944, and was used to form the headquarters of the Odessa Military District.

== Cold War ==
Postwar, the district was formed for a third time on 9 July 1945 at Riga on the basis of Samland Group of Forces formed from the former 1st Baltic Front, under the command of Army General Ivan Bagramyan, who would lead it until 1954. It initially included only the Latvian and Lithuanian Soviet Socialist Republics. Following the disbandment on 27 February 1946 of the Special Military District, which had been administering Kaliningrad Oblast (formerly East Prussia), the oblast was transferred to district control on 1 March. The Special Military District headquarters was reorganized into the 11th Guards Army headquarters. In January 1956 the territory of the Estonian SSR was transferred from the Leningrad Military District.

Circa 1944 a headquarters for Internal Troops in the area was created, which became HQ Internal Troops NKVD-MVD-MGB Baltic MD (Управление ВВ НКВД-МВД-МГБ Прибалтийского округа). This headquarters supervised several Internal Troops divisions, including the 14th Railway Facilities Protection Division NKVD from 1944 to 1951. Other divisions deployed included the 4th, 5th, and 63rd Rifle Divisions NKVD.

On 30 April 1948 10th Guards Army became 4th Guards Rifle Corps.

The main combat formation within the District was the 11th Guards Army in the Kaliningrad Oblast, following the disbandment of 10th Guards Army.

In 1955 the district's forces comprised the 11th Guards Army, the 2nd and the 4th Guards Rifle Corps, the 1st, 5th, 16th, 26th Guards and the 28th and 42nd Rifle Divisions, the 1st Tank Division, the 28th, 29th, and 30th Guards Mechanised Divisions, and the 15th Guards Airborne Corps (76th and 104th Guards Airborne Division).

In 1955 4th Guards Army Corps consisted of 8th (Haapsalu, Estonian SSR) and 118th Guards Rifle Divisions (Tallinn, Estonian SSR); 36th Guards Mechanised Division (Klooga, Estonian SSR); and the 2nd Machine-Gun Artillery Division (Saaremaa Island, Estonian SSR). However, in July 1956 the 118th Guards Rifle Division was disbanded.

For the entire postwar period the 11th Guards Army comprised the 40th Guards Tank Division (former 2nd Guards Cavalry Corps, then 28th Guards Mechanised Division) and the 1st Tank, and the 1st and 26th Guards MRD (former Rifle Divisions). In 1960 the 5th Guards MRD, a former Rifle Division, was disbanded.

With the transfer of the Estonian area to the Leningrad Military District the 2nd Guards 'Tatsin' Tank Division went with it, leaving the District with only the 1st 'Insterburg' Tank Division in Kaliningrad, which had been reorganised from the 1st Guards Tank Corps in the later part of 1945.

The 51st Guards Motor Rifle Vitebsk Division of the Order of Lenin Red Banner was disbanded on 10 March 1960, and its personnel transferred to the 29th Guards Rocket Division.

In 1969 the 8th Guards Motor Rifle Division was moved from the District to the Central Asian Military District and arrived eventually at Frunze.

In 1979 Scott and Scott reported the HQ address of the District as PriBVO, Riga-Center, Ulitsa Merkelya (Merķeļa iela), Dom (house no.) 13, with the officers' club in the same location.

The 901st, 1044th, and 1085th Air Assault Battalions arrived in Latvia, Lithuania, and Estonia, respectively, from Eastern Europe in February-March 1989. See List of air assault battalions of the Soviet Union. The 901st moved to Sukhumi in May 1991 and the other two were disbanded in October 1991.

== Commanders of the Baltic Military District ==
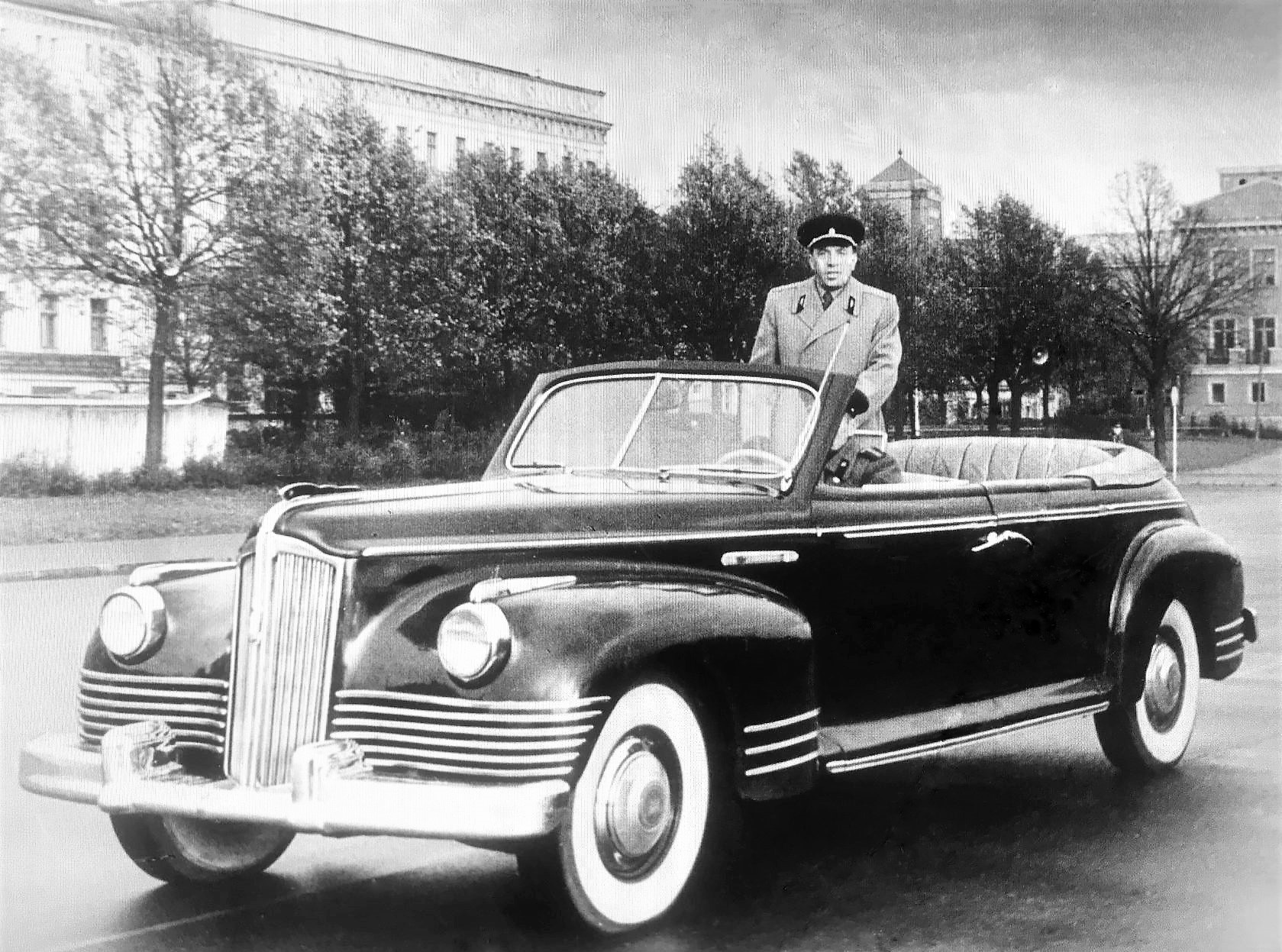
Gusakovsky at a military parade in Riga, 1959.

- 1940: Colonel General Aleksandr Loktionov
- 1940–1941: Colonel General Fyodor Kuznetsov
- 1943–1945: General Major Nikolai Biasi
- 1945–1954: General of the Army Hovhannes Bagramyan
- 1954–1958: General of the Army Aleksandr Gorbatov
- 1958–1959: General of the Army Pavel Batov
- 1959-63: General of the Army Iosif Gusakovsky
- 1963-71: General of the Army Georgy Khetagurov
- 1971-72: Colonel General Vladimir Govorov
- 1972-80: Colonel General Aleksandr Mayorov
- 1980–1984: Colonel General Stanislav Postnikov
- 1984–1987: Colonel General Anatoly Betekhtin
- 1987: Colonel General Viktor Grishin
- 1987-91: Lieutenant General Fyodor Kuzmin
- 1991: Lieutenant General Valery Mironov

== Forces at the end of the 1980s ==
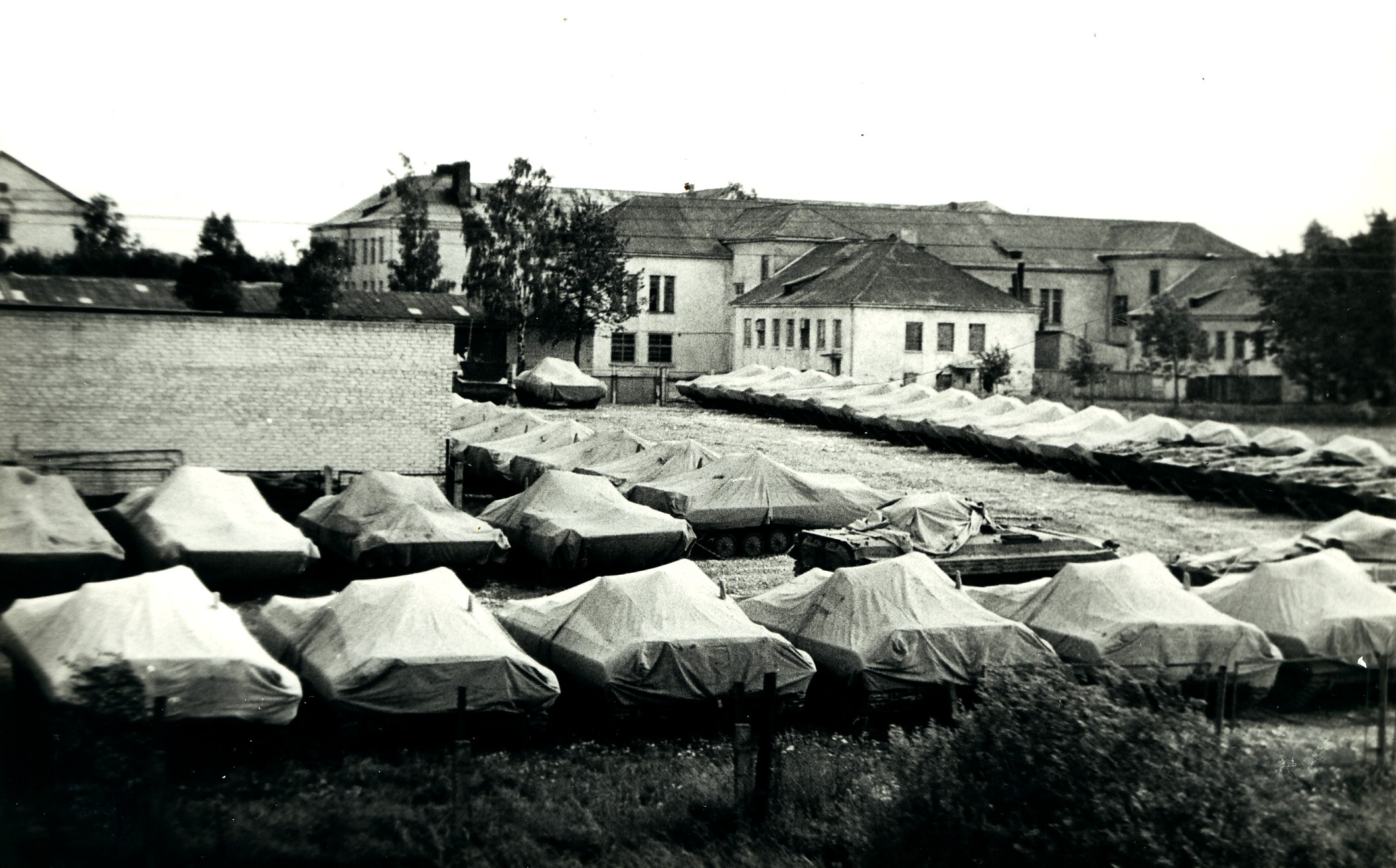
Soviet armoured vehicles in Lithuania in 1991

Toward the end of the 1980s the District's forces consisted of:

- 3rd Guards Motor Rifle Division, Klaipėda (which transferred to the Baltic Fleet as a coastal defence division in 1989)
- 18th Guards Motor Rifle Division, Gusev, Kaliningrad Oblast. Began arriving from Mladá Boleslav, Czechoslovakia, in October 1990, and completed the move in March 1991.
- 24th Tank Training Division, Riga (Formed 9 June 1956, Kubinka, as 24th Heavy Tank Division. Reorganised 25 June 1957 as 24th Tank Division. Moved headquarters about the same time to Dobele, Baltic Military District. August 1960 renamed 24th Tank Training Division. On 14 September 1987 became 54th District Training Centre. 13th Guards Training Motor Rifle Regiment detached in September 1992, reorganised as the 25th Guards Motor Rifle Brigade, but remained in Ādaži until 11.11.93, when it left for Strugi Krasnye (Vladimirsky Lager), Pskov Oblast. The training centre was disbanded in 1995.
- 107th Motor Rifle Division, Vilnius (withdrawn to Solnechnogorsk, 1993)
- 144th Guards Motor Rifle Division, Tallinn (the former 29th Guards Rifle Division) This division had for some time a regiment named for Alexander Matrosov. Withdrawn February 1993 to Yelnya, Moscow Military District.
- 11th Guards Army
  - 1st Tank Division, Kaliningrad
  - 1st Guards Motor Rifle Division, Kaliningrad
  - 26th Guards Motor Rifle Division, Gusev, Kaliningrad Oblast – September 1989 became 5190th Guards Base for Storage of Weapons and Equipment
  - 40th Guards Tank Division, Sovetsk
- 37th Air Assault Brigade
- 149th Artillery Division, Kaliningrad

The 7th Guards Airborne Division with its headquarters at Kaunas Fortress, and the 44th Training Airborne Division, at Gaižiūnai, of the Soviet Airborne Forces were also located within the district. The Soviet Air Force's presence within the District in the 1980s consisted of the 15th Air Army, headquartered at Riga, and the 2nd Army of the Soviet Air Defence Forces.

On 1 January 1991 the 15th Air Army consisted of the:

- 79th Separate Communications Regiment (Riga)
- 249th Separate Mixed Aviation Squadron (Riga) with 7 Mi-8, 1 Mi-6 and a few transport aircraft
- 285th Separate Electronic Warfare Helicopter Squadron (Jelgava, Riga area) with 19 Mi-8
- 886th Order of the Red Banner "Stalingrad" Separate Reconnaissance Aviation Regiment (Jēkabpils, Latvian SSR) with 12 Su-24 and 14 Su-17M4 [known as the 16th ORAP in WW2]
- 39th Fighter-Bomber Aviation Division (Lielvārde, Riga area) [activated 1981]
  - 53rd Guards "Stalingrad" Fighter-Bomber Aviation Regiment (Šiauliai, Lithuanian SSR) with 35 MiG-27 and 11 MiG-23
  - 372nd Fighter-Bomber Aviation Regiment (APIB) (Daugavpils, Latvian SSR) with 49 MiG-27 and 12 MiG-23
  - 899th Fighter-Bomber Aviation Regiment ([Lielvārde, Riga area) with 47 MiG-27 and 11 MiG-23

During September 1991 the District was reorganised into the North Western Group of Forces (ru:Северо-Западная группа войск). The Baltic MD was renamed by USSR Presidential Decree of 15 Nov 1991 The North Western Group of Forces was subordinated to the jurisdiction of the Russian Federation by a Decree of the Russian President of 27 January 1992. It ended its existence on 1 September 1994 with all Russian forces withdrawn from Lithuania, Latvia, and Estonia. Russia officially ended its military presence in the Baltics after it turned off the Skrunda-1 radar station in Latvia on 31 August 1998. Ground Forces in the Kaliningrad oblast came under the command of 11th Guards Army, which four to five years later became the Ground and Coastal Defence Forces of the Baltic Fleet.

== Sources ==
=== Bibliography ===
- Andrew Duncan, Russian Forces in Decline - Part 2, Jane's Intelligence Review, October 1996
- Feskov, V.I.; K.A. Kalashnikov; V.I. Golikov (2004). The Soviet Army in the Years of the 'Cold War' (1945–1991). Tomsk: Tomsk University Press. ISBN 5-7511-1819-7. (inc district commanders 1972-)
- Kasyanenko, V. I. (2008). "51-я гвардейская Витебская ордена Ленина Краснознаменная стрелковая им. К.Е. Ворошилова дивизия". 29 гвардейская ракетная витебская ордена Ленина Краснознаменная дивизия. Исторический очерк (in Russian). Moscow: Tsentralny Izdatelsko-Poligrafichesky kompleks RVSN (TsIPK).
- Ivanov, Sergei, ed. (2002). "Прибалтийский военный округ" [Baltic Military District]. Военная энциклопедия в 8 томах [Military Encyclopedia in 8 volumes] (in Russian). Vol. 6. Moscow: Voenizdat. pp. 593–594. ISBN 5-203-01873-1.
