= 15th Air Army =

- Active: 11 July 1942 – December 1993
- Disbanded: December 1993
- Country: Soviet Union; Russia
- Branch: Soviet Air Forces; Russian Air Force
- Engagements: Great Patriotic War; Cold War

The 15th Air Army was a military formation of the Soviet Air Forces, active from July 1942 until December 1993.

== History ==
It was formed between 11 July and 15 August 1942, in accordance with the directive of the commander of the Soviet Air Force of 10 July 1942, on the basis of the Air Force of the Bryansk Front. The formation of the army began in the village of Pavlovka (18 km southeast of the city of Yelets) in the Lipetsk Oblast. For 10 days the creation of the army was supervised by the deputy commander of the Red Army Air Force, General-Lieutenant of Aviation Grigory Vorozheykin, who was temporary commander of the air army. From July 21, Major General of Aviation I. G. Pyatykhin, arrived from the Leningrad Front, continued and completed the formation of the association as part of the Bryansk Front. Along with Pyatykhin as commander regimental commissar Mikhail Sukhachev arrived. In August 1942 Major General of Aviation Alexey Antonovich Sakovnin became chief of staff. Initially, the army included 286th Fighter Aviation Division, 225th Attack Aviation Division, 284th Bomber Aviation Division, and three separate air regiments.

The 15th Air Army received its baptism of fire in the autumn of 1942, participating in the defensive battles near Voronezh and in the elimination of the enemy's foothold on the left bank of the Don. In the winter of 1943, it supported the front troops in the Voronezh–Kastornoye operation.

In May 1943 it participated in an air operation to destroy German aircraft at airfields.

In July–August 1943, as part of the Battle of Kursk, she participated in the Orlov Strategic Offensive, and in September 1943, it supported the front troops in the Bryansk Offensive.

In October 1943, the Army was transferred to the 2nd Baltic Front, where it fought in the Leningrad–Novgorod Offensive and Riga Offensive (1944).

In 1945, the Army participated in the elimination of Army Group Courland and German forces in the Klaipėda area (January–February 1945).

In April 1945, the recently captured Auce Airfield was used as a forward operation base for its medium and light bombers. Afterwards, the Army began flying bombing missions against German positions and airfields near Talsi.

On 1 May 1945 the Army comprised 5th Bomber Aviation Corps (4th, 5th Guards Bomber Aviation Divisions); 14th Fighter Aviation Corps (185th, 315th Fighter Aviation Divisions); the 284th, 313th Night Bomber Aviation Divisions; the 214th, 225th, 305th Assault Aviation Divisions; the 336th Fighter Aviation Division; four separate regiments: the 99th Guards Reconnaissance Aviation Regiment; the 187th Fire Correction Aviation Regiment; the 699th Transport Aviation Regiment; the 97th Aviation Regiment of the Civil Air Fleet, and the 87th Night Bomber Aviation Squadron. There were also the 1639th, 1683rd, and 1685th Anti-Aircraft Artillery Regiments.

Also part of the Army was the 1003rd Separate Medical Evacuation Aviation Regiment.

During World War II, in total, 15th Air Army pilots made some 160,000 sorties.

=== After 1945 ===
The 315th Fighter Aviation Division, and within it the 50th Fighter Aviation Regiment, was part of the army from July 1945 to August 1946.

In the post-war period, the army was part of the Baltic Military District.

The 15th Air Army was renamed the 30th Air Army between 20 February 1949 and 4 April 1968.

The 15th Air Army was renamed the Air Forces of the Baltic Military District between December 1977 and May 1988. In spring 1980, the 899th Fighter Aviation Regiment, part of the 1st Guards Stalingradsko-Berlinskaya Red Banner Fighter Aviation Division, 15th Air Army, moved from Riga-Rumbula also in Latvia to Lielvārde airfield. In July 1981 the regiment was redesignated as a Fighter-Bomber Aviation Regiment and shifted to the 39th Fighter-Bomber Aviation Division, still within the Air Forces, but now within the Air Forces of the Baltic Military District, as it had become.

On 1 January 1991 the 15th Air Army consisted of the:

- 79th Separate Communications Regiment (Riga)
- 249th Separate Mixed Aviation Squadron (Riga) with 7 Mi-8, 1 Mi-6 and a few transport aircraft
- 285th Separate Electronic Warfare Helicopter Squadron (Jelgava, Riga area) with 19 Mi-8
- 886th Order of the Red Banner "Stalingrad" Separate Reconnaissance Aviation Regiment (Jēkabpils, Latvian SSR) with 12 Su-24 and 14 Su-17M4. The regiment was known as the 16th Independent Reconnaissance Aviation Regiment (ORAP) during the Second World War.
- 39th Fighter-Bomber Aviation Division (Liyelvalde, Riga area), activated 1981.
  - 53rd Guards "Stalingrad" Fighter-Bomber Aviation Regiment (Šiauliai, Lithuanian SSR) with 35 MiG-27 and 11 MiG-23
  - 372nd Fighter-Bomber Aviation Regiment (APIB) (Daugavpils, Latvian SSR) with 49 MiG-27 and 12 MiG-23
  - 899th Fighter-Bomber Aviation Regiment (Lielvarde, Riga area) with 47 MiG-27 and 11 MiG-23.

The 15th Air Army was disbanded in December 1993 as the North Western Group of Forces was withdrawn from the now-free Baltic states.

== Army Commanders ==
- 10.07.1942 - 21.07.1942 : Lieutenant-General of Aviation Grigory Vorozheykin
- 21.07.1942 - 01.05.1943 : Major General of Aviation Ivan Pyatykhin;
- 05.1943 - 05.1950 : Colonel-General of Aviation Nikolai Naumenko;
- 05.1950 - 10.1953 : Colonel-General of Aviation F. P. Polynin,
- 10.1953 - 01.1957 : Lieutenant General of Aviation S. I. Mironov,.
- 01.1957 - 04.1958 : Lieutenant General of Aviation V. A. Vinogradov,;
- 04.1958 - 05.1973 : Colonel-General of Aviation F. I. Shinkarenko;
- 03.1979 - 10.1985 : Lieutenant General of Aviation Masalitin Piotr;
- 10.1985 - 02.1988 : Lieutenant General of Aviation Dmitri Bobrov;
- 02.1988 - 07.1991 : Lieutenant General of Aviation Timchenko Vladimir Pavlovic;
- 07.1991 - 12.1993 : Major General of Aviation Mikhail Lipatov.

== Sources ==
- 15th Air Army
