= Augšdaugava =

Protected landscape area

- IUCN category V (protected landscape/seascape)
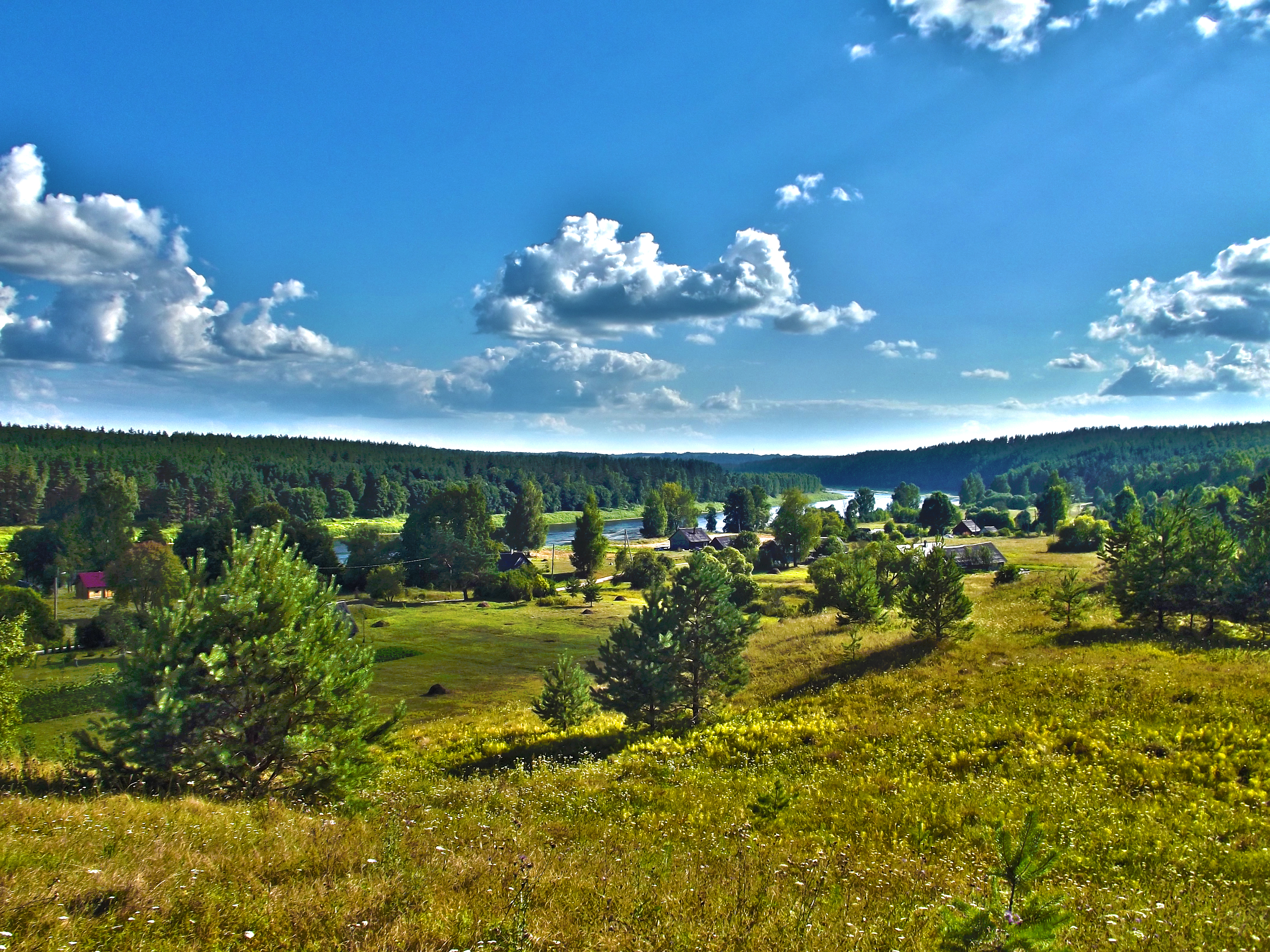
- Daugava riverside at Slutiški

- Location within Latvia
- Location: Latvia, Latgale
- Coordinates: 55°53′00″N 27°00′00″E
- Area: 520.78 km^{2} (201.07 sq mi)
- Established: 1990

Augšdaugava is a protected landscape located in Latgale, Augšdaugava Municipality and Krāslava Municipality on the banks of the Daugava Augšdaugava lowering, as well as stretching to the side of Latgale Highland in the north and Augšzeme in the south. Established in 1990 to preserve outstanding cultural and natural values in the Daugava Valley and its surroundings. The territory includes Daugava Loop Nature Park and several protected nature objects: Adamova Cliff, Daugava Gate (Slutišķi and Ververu Cliff), Mālkalne Spring, Sandarišku Karengravas, Sproģu ravine, Viļuši spring, Hoftenberg park, Juzefova park, Rozališķi park. It is Natura 2000 area.
