= Sestā grupa (Liepāja) =

District in Latvia

Coordinates: 56°34′00″N 21°02′00″E

Sestā grupa (Sixth Group) is the most northern district of Liepāja, located near Karosta and Tosmare, Latvia.

== History ==
On the present territory of the district in the second half of 20th century was located USSR military warehouses - sixth group of rear supply of Baltic Fleet, which gives the name to this area of the city. From 1997 the district is located on the territory of Liepaja Special Economic Zone, but is mostly uninhabited and are not built up, because of the lack of infrastructure, which was dismantled after withdrawal of Russian army from Liepāja in 1994.
