= Dinaburga Castle =

Castle in Latvia

- Latgale, Latvia
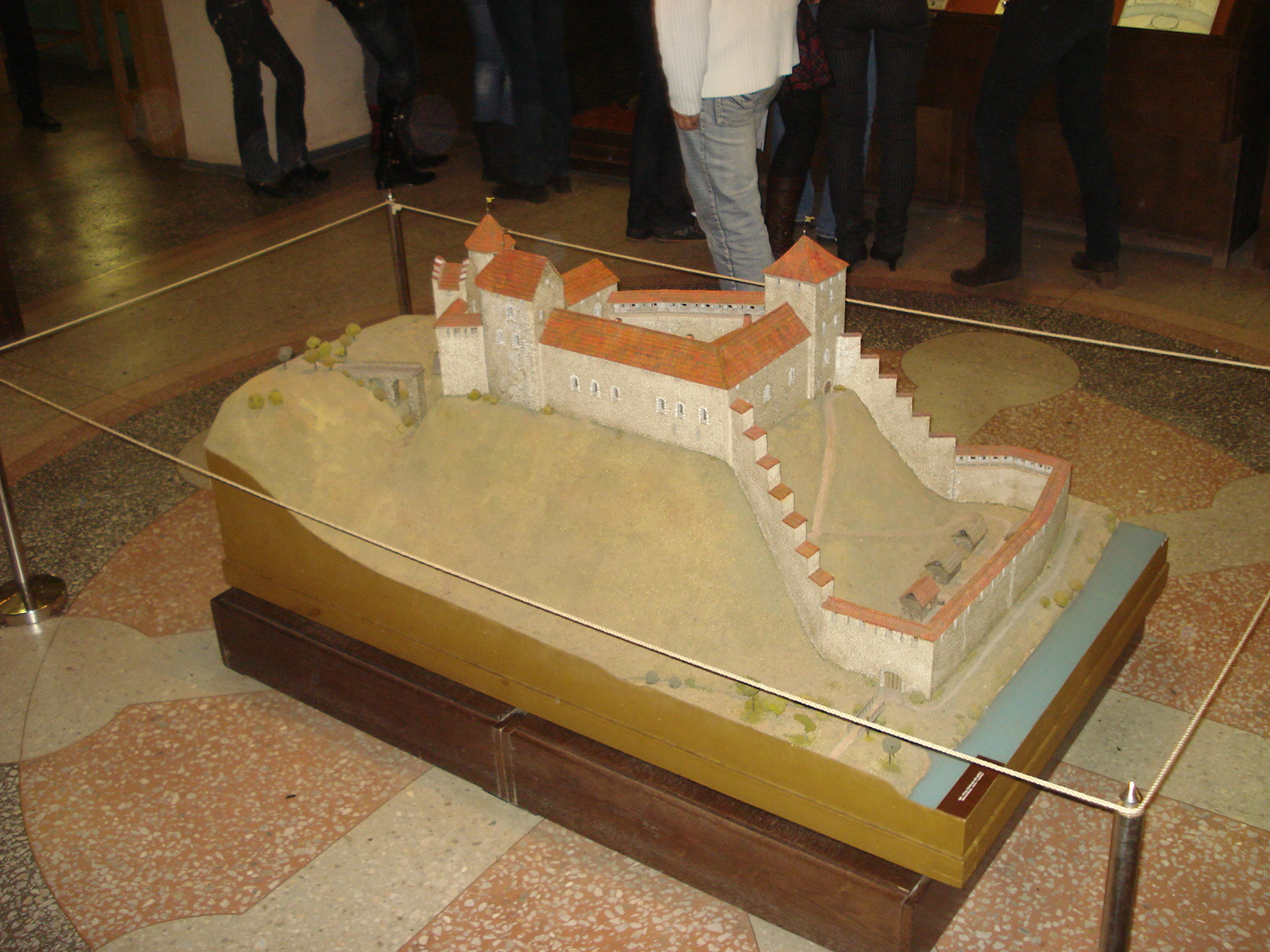
- Museum Model of Castle

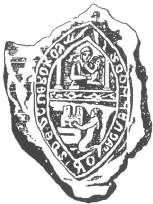
- Seal of the Komtur of Dünaburg Castle

Site information
- Type: Castle
- Open to the public: yes
- Condition: parts of foundation exposed in excavations

Location
- Coordinates: 55°54′45″N 26°43′30″E

Site history
- Built: circa 1273–1277
- Built by: Livonian Order
- Materials: Stone
- Demolished: before 1577

Dinaburga Castle (German: Dünaburg), also known as Vecdaugavpils or Vecpils, is a castle located in Naujene Parish, Augšdaugava Municipality in the Latgale region of Latvia, east of Daugavpils. It is strategically situated on a high bank of the Daugava River. It was built between 1273 and 1277 by the Livonian Order, and destroyed by Russian troops before 1577. Nowadays, fragments of the foundation are exposed.

== History ==
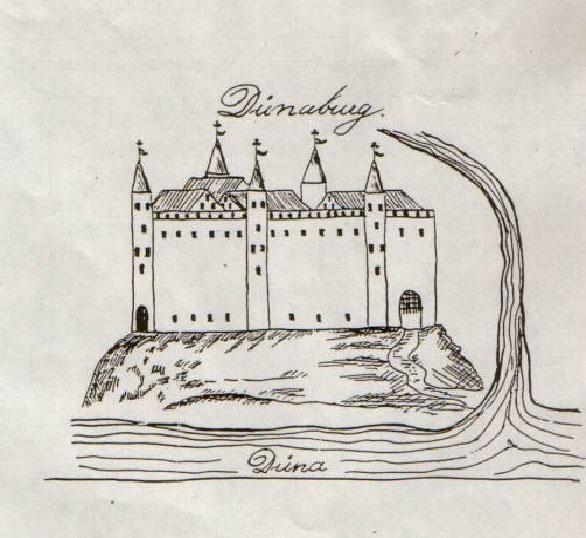
Dinaburg Castle before the destruction in 1577.

In 1273 the order built Dinaburga Castle on lands nominally controlled by Grand Duke of Lithuania Traidenis. The castle was of great strategic importance: it was used as a base for Order raids into central Lithuania in hopes that a weakened Traidenis would discontinue his support of Semigallians who rebelled against the Order. In 1277 castle was surrounded by Traidenis. Within a month, the castle was stormed with 4 movable siege towers. The Russians fought among the attackers, but this did not bring any success, and the Lithuanians were forced to destroy the siege equipment and to withdraw through Daugava. The Order Master Ernst von Ratzeburg responded with an unsuccessful march to the depths of Lithuania in 1278. Than Battle of Aizkraukle ensued.

Russians and Lithuanians in the 14th-16th centuries attacked and demolished the castle, but each time the magistrates rebuilt it:

- 1313 the castle was rebuilt by the Master Gerhard von Jork,
- 1396 the castle was again destroyed by the Lithuanians, but the Order rebuilt it,
- 1403 Grand Duke of Lithuania Vytautas, who started the war with the Order, invaded Latgale and devastated the castle of Dinaburg. It was rebuilt by the swordsmen,
- 1418 the castle was attacked again by Vytautas and burned down,
- 1481 Dinaburg was commanded by the regiment of the Grand Duke of Moscow Ivan III of Russia under the supervision of the Master Wolter von Plettenberg. The magistrate was forced to sign a contract for payment of tribute imposed on him by Duchy of Moscow,
- 1558 The war with Livonia was started by Ivan the Terrible because he wanted to get a strategic access to the Baltic Sea, and got casus belli when the Treaty of Pozvol between Sigismund II Augustus, the ruler of Lithuania and Poland, and Johann Wilhelm von Fürstenberg, Master of the Livonian Order was concluded in 1557, proclaiming the military union of the Livonian Order, the Kingdom of Poland and the Grand Duchy of Lithuania against the Grand Duchy of Moscow,
- 1559 the castle was occupied by Russian and Tatar troops, where Ivan the Terrible had his residence for some time,
- 1561 By the Treaty of Vilnius (1561) Livonia was divided and Latgale (with Dinaburg), Vidzeme and South Estonia were given to Lithuania for administration; The treaty was signed by the King of Poland and the Grand Duke of Lithuania Sigismund Augustus. After the Union of Lublin was signed in 1569 Poland also received the right to administer these lands. Dinaburg became the administrative center of Latgale, where the bishop of the Catholic Church had residence,
- 1577 Dinaburg was attacked by Ivan the Terrible's army for two weeks, firing from bombards projectiles with massive bombs of 20 pounds (320 kg). They were made by the students of Andrey Chokhov, who created the masterpiece of casting the Tsar Cannon. At Tsar's command, Dinaburg was crushed to the ground. After the siege the settlement was moved 19 km downstream from the Daugava River to the present location of Daugavpils. After the castle lost its military importance, King Stephen Báthory decided not to rebuild the old Dinaburg castle and to rebuild the Daugavpils fortress instead.
- 1671 it was yet another attempt to rebuild the castle but it was finally destroyed during the Great Northern War (1700–1721). It is known that the local peasants demolished the masonry and sold the materials to build the fortress. Despite the Tsar 31 December 1826 in order to protect all ancient remains, the Vitebsk State Property Ward sold wall bricks and stones for 300 rubles. The main walls of the castle were demolished in 1811 - 1829.

== See also ==
- List of castles in Latvia
