= VNT (disambiguation) =

VNT or Vnt may refer to:

- Vitronectin, a glycoprotein of the hemopexin family

VNT may refer to:

- Variable-nozzle turbines, a type of turbochargers
- the IATA code of Ventspils International Airport, in Latvia
- the NYSE code of Vontier
- the ASX and NZX codes of Ventia
- Vanaja neliveto telillä, a lorry model of the Finnish company Vanajan Autotehdas
