= Vorozheykin =

Vorozheikin or Vorozheykin (feminine: Vorozheykina) is a Russian-language surname derived from the word vorozheyka, vorozheya, meaning female fortune teller or medicine woman.

The surname may refer to:

- Grigory Vorozheykin (1895−1974), Soviet military officer
- Arseniy Vorozheykin (1912−2001), Soviet military officer
