= Nikolai Naumenko =

Soviet military aviator

Nikolai Fyodorovich Naumenko
- Николай Фёдорович Науменко
- Born: 17 October [O.S. 4 October] 1909; Russian Empire
- Died: 7 July 1967 (aged 65); Moscow, USSR
- Military career
- Allegiance: Soviet Union
- Branch: Soviet Air Force
- Service years: 1918 - 1953
- Rank: General-colonel of aviation
- Conflicts: World War II
- Awards: Order of Lenin

Nikolai Fedorovich Naumenko (Russian: Николай Фёдорович Науменко; 17 October 1901 – 7 July 1967) was a Soviet military aviator who commanded the 4th Air and 15th Air Army during the Second World War.
