= Battle of Aizkraukle =

1279 battle between Lithuania and the Teutonic Order

Coordinates: 56°36′N 25°15′E

- Part of the Livonian Crusade
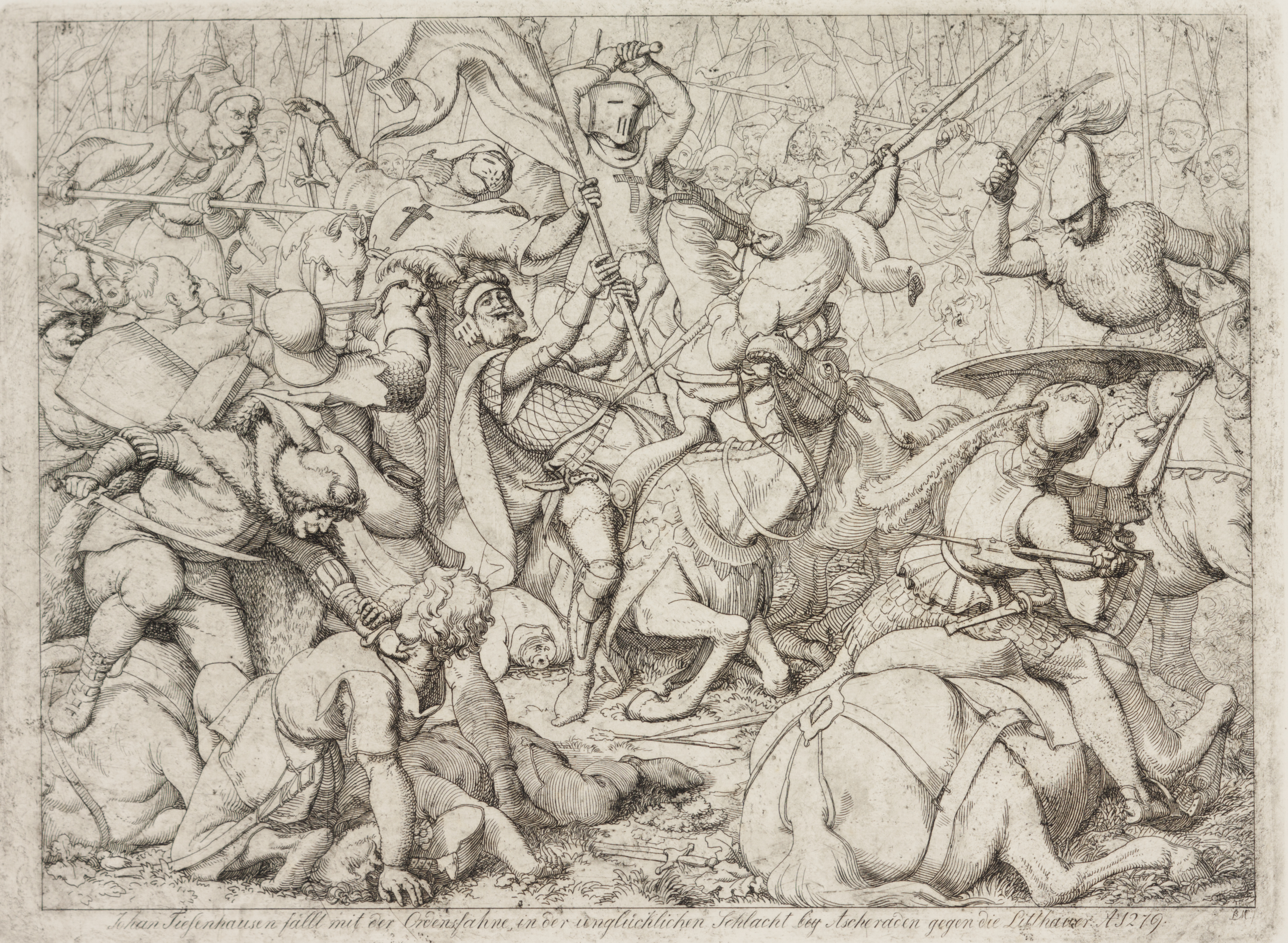
- Death of Johann von Tiesenhausen during the Battle of Aizkraukle, holding the Livonian Order's banner (by Friedrich Ludwig von Maydell, 1842)
Date	5 March 1279
Location	Near Aizkraukle
Result	Lithuanian and Semigallian victory

Belligerents
Grand Duchy of Lithuania Semigallians	Livonian branch of the Teutonic Order

Commanders and leaders
Traidenis	Ernst von Rassburg †; Eilart Hoberg †

Casualties and losses
Unknown	71 knights killed

The Battle of Aizkraukle or Ascheraden was fought on 5 March 1279 between the Grand Duchy of Lithuania, led by Traidenis, and the Livonian branch of the Teutonic Order near Aizkraukle (German: Ascheraden) in present-day Latvia. The order suffered a great defeat: 71 knights, including the grand master, Ernst von Rassburg, and Eilart Hoberg, leader of the knights from Danish Estonia, were killed. It was the second-largest defeat of the order in the 13th century. After the battle Duke Nameisis of the Semigallians recognized Traidenis as his suzerain.

== Background ==
In 1273 the order built Dinaburga Castle on lands nominally controlled by Traidenis. The castle was of great strategic importance: it was used as a base for raids into central Lithuania in hopes that a weakened Traidenis would discontinue his support of Semigalians who rebelled against the order. Traidenis besieged the castle for a month but failed to capture it. Historiography often claims that the order started the campaign into Lithuania in retaliation for the siege. However, newer research by Edvardas Gudavičius and Artūras Dudonis deny a direct cause and effect relationship between the siege and the campaign, as the siege is dated 1274. They claim that the campaign was a result of a broken peace treaty between Lithuania and Livonia. The peace was concluded so that Traidenis could concentrate on his war with Galicia–Volhynia. Livonia and Lithuania also competed for trade along the Daugava River and for influence in the Principality of Polotsk.

Livonia in 1260, showing the location of Ascheraden (Aizkraukle)

== Campaign and battle ==
The Livonian campaign, which opened in February 1279, involved a chevauchée into Lithuanian territory. The Livonian army included men from the Livonian Order, Archbishopric of Riga, Danish Estonia, and local Curonian and Semigallian tribes. At the time of the campaign, Lithuania suffered a famine and Traidenis' brother Sirputis raided Polish lands around Lublin. The Livonian army reached as far as Kernavė, the center of the Grand Duke's lands. They did not meet any open resistance and plundered many villages. On their way home the knights were followed by a small force of Traidenis' troops. When the enemies approached Aizkraukle, the Grand Master sent most of the local warriors home with their share of loot. At that point the Lithuanians attacked. The Semigallians were one of the first to retreat from the battlefield and the Lithuanians achieved a decisive victory.

== Aftermath ==
The order lost its achievements over six preceding years: the Semigallians rebelled once again and submitted to Traidenis for protection. However, Traidenis died ca. 1282 and the Grand Duchy of Lithuania was unable to reap all the benefits. The order decided to elect one grand master with the Teutonic Knights so that any future attacks would be carried out simultaneously from the west and north.
