= 14th Railway Facilities Protection Division NKVD =

- 14-я дивизия войск НКВД СССР по охране железнодорожных сооружений
- Active: 1944–1951
- Country: Soviet Union
- Branch: Division NKVD
- Garrison/HQ: Vilnius, Lithuanian SSR
- Equipment: Armoured train
- Engagements: World War II
- Commander: Alexey Konstantinovich Krylov (1944–1949)

The 14th Division of the NKVD of the USSR for the Protection of Railway Facilities (Russian: 14-я дивизия войск НКВД СССР по охране железнодорожных сооружений, romanized: 14-ya diviziya voysk NKVD SSSR po okhrane zheleznodorozhnykh sooruzheniy, lit. '14th Division of the USSR NKVD Troops for the Protection of Railway Structures') was a Soviet military formation in World War II. It was a component of the NKVD Internal Troops.

It was formed in accordance with the order of the NKVD number 00922 of 3 August 1944.

From 1944 to 1946 it was placed under the Headquarters, Internal Troops, NKVD-MVD, Baltic Military District (Russian: Управление ВВ НКВД-МВД Прибалтийского округа).

Alongside the division in the Baltic MD VV forces at times from 1944 were the 4th, 5th and 63rd Rifle Divisions NKVD, along with detachments from the Dzerzhensky Division from Moscow.

== Dispositions ==
- Division headquarters and units of combat support and logistics - Vilnius, Lithuanian SSR (1944–1951)
- 76th Regiment - headquartered in Orsha, Vitebsk Region, Byelorussian SSR (1950–1951)
- 82nd Regiment - headquartered in Insterburg (1945–1946), then in Königsberg former East Prussia (1946)
- 152nd Regiment - headquartered in Rēzekne (1944), then in Riga, Latvian SSR (1944–1951)
- 211th Regiment - headquartered in Kaunas, Lithuanian SSR (1944–1951)
- 212th Regiment - headquartered in Brest (1944–1945), then in Baranavichy, Brest Region, Byelorussian SSR (1945–1946, 1946–1951)
- 213th Regiment - first headquarters in Białystok, Belastok Region (1944–?), then in Maladzyechna, Minsk Region, Byelorussian SSR (?–1946)
- 329th Regiment - headquartered in Jelgava, Latvian SSR (1945)
- 353rd Regiment - headquartered in Kaunas, Lithuanian SSR (1946)

It served as part of the 'operational Army' from 3 August 1944 to 10 February 1945. It participated in the Operation Bagration and the Baltic, East Prussian and East Pomeranian offensive operations.

After the end of World War II the division conducted operational work to combat gang violence (the Forest Brothers).

It was disbanded in accordance with the order of the Ministry of Internal Affairs of the USSR number 00248 of 15 May 1951.
