= Liepāja International Airport =

Airport in Liepāja, Latvia

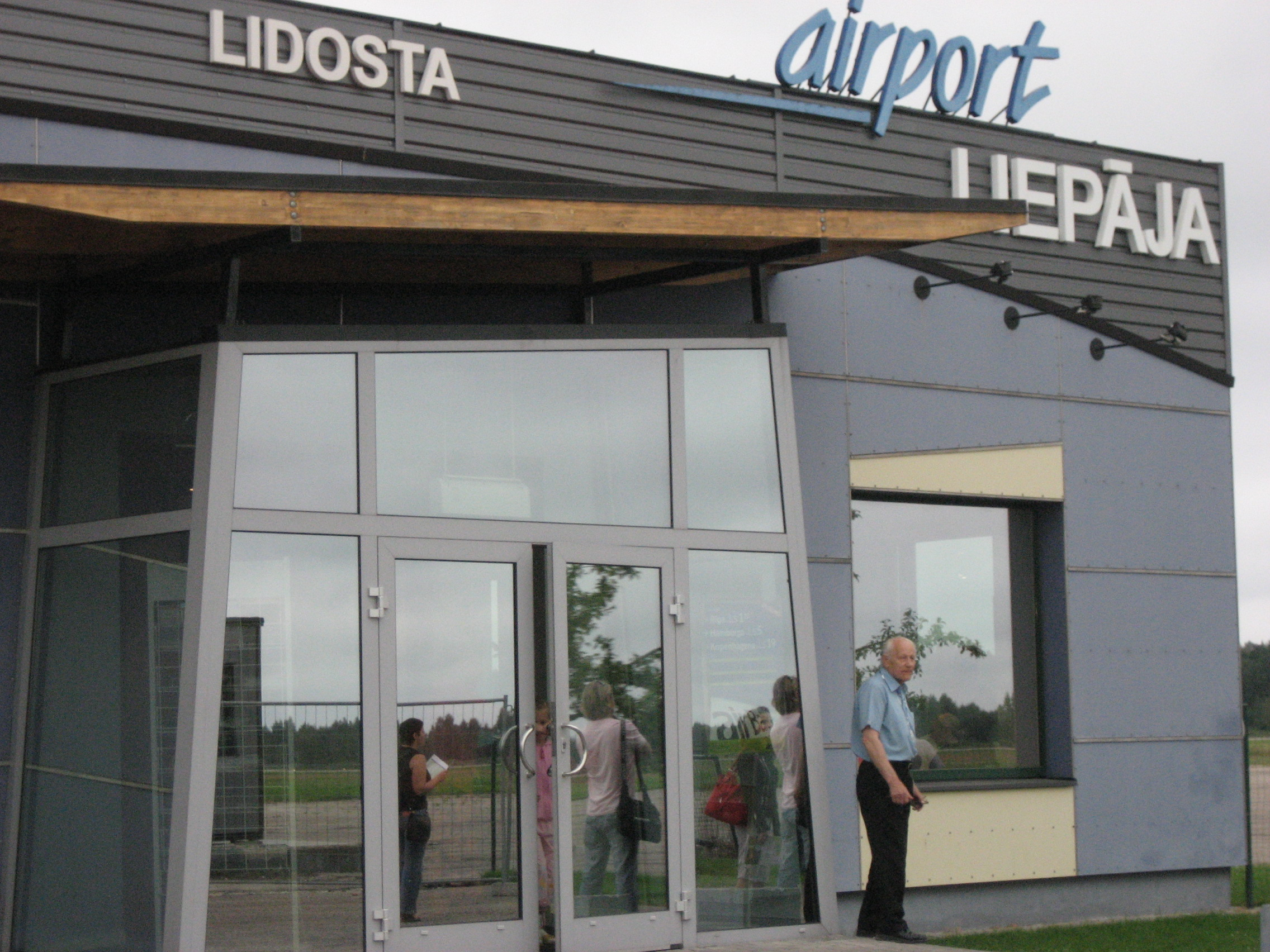
- IATA: LPX; ICAO: EVLA

Summary
- Airport type: Public
- Owner: Liepāja City Municipality
- Operator: Aviasabiedrība "Liepāja" SIA
- Location: South Kurzeme Municipality, Liepāja
- Hub for: airBaltic pilot academy
- Built: 1940
- Elevation AMSL: 18 ft / 5.5 m
- Coordinates: 56°31′03″N 021°05′49″E
- Website: www.liepaja-airport.lv

Map
- Location of airport in Latvia

Runways
| Direction | Length | | Surface |
| Direction | m | ft | Surface |
|---|---|---|---|
| 06/24 | 2,002 | 6,568 | Asphalt/Concrete |

Statistics (2019)
- Number of Passengers: 14,082
- Source: Aerodrome chart Latvian AIP at EUROCONTROL

Liepāja International Airport (IATA: LPX, ICAO: EVLA) is a regional airport in western Latvia which is certified for international air traffic. Along with Riga International Airport and Ventspils Airport, it is one of the three major airports in Latvia.

== Overview ==
Liepāja International Airport is situated in South Kurzeme Municipality, 2.7 NM (5.0 km; 3.1 mi) east of Liepāja, 210 km (130 mi) from the capital of Latvia, Riga, and 60 km (37 mi) from the Lithuanian border. The territory of the airport covers 2.2 km^{2} (0.85 sq mi) and is integrated within the Liepāja Special Economic Zone.

== Airline services ==
In 2007, The Baltic Times reported that the launch of Rīga–Liepāja flights was followed by planned airBaltic services from Liepāja to Copenhagen and Hamburg, which it described as the first international routes from a Latvian airport terminal outside Rīga. The Rīga–Liepāja domestic route was operated by Fokker 50 aircraft and lasted about 40 minutes.

After the 2014–2016 reconstruction, the airport was recertified for commercial flights in September 2016. In March 2017, LSM reported that airBaltic would begin domestic flights between Rīga and Liepāja on 16 May 2017. BNN reported that the route would be served three times weekly with Bombardier Q400 NextGen aircraft and that each flight would take about 40 minutes. Scheduled Rīga–Liepāja passenger flights stopped in 2020 during the COVID-19 pandemic.

In July and August 2024, airBaltic operated temporary Rīga–Liepāja flights connected with the Latvian round of the World Rally Championship and the Summer Sound festival. LSM reported that six return trips were planned, but that airBaltic did not plan to resume regular service because the route was not considered profitable under then-current demand and capacity conditions. In April 2026, LSM reported that there had been no regular passenger flights at Liepāja Airport for six years, although the airport continued to handle private, business and charter flights.

== History ==
The airport first began operations as a military airfield in 1940. Early during the Cold War, the airfield was a Soviet Anti-Air Defense base. Its aircraft shot down a U.S. Air Force PB4Y-2 Privateer BuNo 59645 on April 8, 1950.

The airport was closed from 20 September 2014 for infrastructure reconstruction works. It reopened for general aviation and military flights on 26 May 2016; LSM reported that the reconstruction had been co-financed by the European Union Cohesion Fund and that maintenance would be covered by the municipality. The airport returned to fully operational status in September 2016.

=== Pilot training and non-scheduled operations ===
On 12 March 2020, a new airBaltic Pilot Academy aircraft hangar was opened at Liepāja Airport. LSM reported that the hangar opening coincided with the interruption of many flights during the COVID-19 pandemic, but that Pilot Academy activity continued during the emergency period and contributed to airport activity. According to LSM, the airport handled 4,117 flights in 2020, a recent record that was largely attributed to Pilot Academy training flights.

In 2021, airBaltic did not relaunch the Rīga–Liepāja route because of low passenger numbers, while airport operations continued through private charter flights and Pilot Academy flights. In January 2022, LSM reported that the airport had served 4,200 flights in the previous year, helped by the airBaltic Pilot Academy and private and business flights.

In 2026, LSM reported that the airport had handled 154 non-scheduled flights in the previous year and that most of its revenue came from the airBaltic Pilot Academy, which conducted approximately 4,000 training flights per year. The same report said that the academy planned an administrative building and two additional hangars at the airport.

The airport held the Baltic International Airshow in 2022.

== Statistics ==
| | Number of Movements (Note: number of movements represents total aircraft takeoffs and landings during that year) | Freight (tonnes) |
|---|---|---|
| 2004 | 298 | 25 |
| 2005 | 338 | |
| 2006 | 310 | |
| 2007 | 1,692 | |
| 2008 | 2,695 | |
| 2009 | 190 | |

== See also ==
- List of airports in Latvia
- Transportation in Latvia
