= Nivenskoye =

Nivenskoye
- Kaliningrad, Kaliningrad Oblast in Russia

Site information
- Type: Air Base
- Owner: Ministry of Defence
- Operator: Russian Air Force

Location
- Shown within Kaliningrad Oblast Nivenskoye (Russia) Nivenskoye (Europe)
- Coordinates: 54°33′42″N 020°36′12″E

Site history
- Built: 1945
- In use: 1945 - 2002

Airfield information
- Identifiers: ICAO: XMWN
- Elevation: 20 metres (66 ft) AMSL
Runways
Direction	Length and surface
07/25	2,500 metres (8,202 ft) Concrete

Nivenskoye (also Severnyi, Uzhnyi & Yezau (US)) (Russian: Южный) is a former interceptor aircraft air base in Kaliningrad Oblast, Russia located 17 km south of Kaliningrad. A large mile-wide taxiway ring on west side fed a series of aircraft revetments. There were remote bomber or alert revetments for about 5 aircraft. It is abandoned and in a state of decay as of 2000.

Nivenskoye was a Second World War airfield, which was blown up by the Germans in 1945 during their retreat. It was rebuilt by the Soviet Union between 1948 and 1950 using Soviet soldiers and German civilians. By 1951 it had a length of 1500 m (4920 ft) and was used by the Soviet Air Force. By 1957 up to 25 MiG-15 (Fagot) aircraft were based at the airfield.

From October 1952 Nivenskoye was home to the 689th Guards Fighter Aviation Regiment (689 Gv IAP) flying the Mikoyan-Gurevich MiG-15, March 1951–1954; the Mikoyan-Gurevich MiG-17 and MiG-17P, October 1953 – 1957; the MiG-19S/P, October 1956 – 1977; the Mikoyan-Gurevich MiG-23M, 1977–1989; and the Sukhoi Su-27 "Flanker," a total of 36, from 1989. The regiment had received the honorary name "Sandomierz", in 1944, for participation in the Lvov-Sandomierz operation, and in the same year it was awarded the Order of Alexander Nevsky. The airbase was also home to 288th Independent Helicopter Regiment (288 OVP) flying Mil Mi-24 K and R models and Mil Mi-8.

689 Gv IAP & 288th Independent Helicopter Regiment based at Uzhnyi moved to Kaliningrad Chkalovsk, also within the Kaliningrad Oblast, during August 2002.
