= Lociki =

Village in Latvia

Coordinates: 55°56′21″N 26°38′52″E

Lociki (or Lotsiki) (Latvian: Lociki (Lāči); Russian: Лоцики) is a settlement in Naujene Parish, Augšdaugava Municipality, in the Latgale region of Latvia. It is located 12 km northeast of Daugavpils.

Lociki originated with a few houses round a small military air base, which today is being redeveloped as Daugavpils International Airport.

As of 2005, the village has a population of 1,321.

Lociki is home to the Naujene Local History Museum (Naujenes novadpētniecības muzejs) also known as the Folk Museum "Naujene". The museum, opened in 1996, exhibits the national heritage of Naujene parish .

The future of Lociki is based on the building of Daugavpils International Airport. This will lead to the further development of activities based on servicing the airport and its customers and will also attract investments to the Lociki area.

== Sources ==
- (in Latvian) Naujene Parish official website
- (in Latvian) Naujene Local History Museum
