= Nikolai Biasi =

Soviet general (1893–1973)

Nikolai Nikolayevich Biasi
- Born: 14 April 1893; Tbilisi, Georgia, Russian Empire
- Died: 7 April 1973 (aged 79) Yessentuki, Soviet Union
- Allegiance: Russia; Soviet Union
- Branch: Soviet Army
- Service years: 1914–1953
- Rank: Lieutenant General
- Commands: Baltic Military District
- Conflicts: World War I Russian Civil War; World War II
- Awards: Order of Lenin (twice); Order of the Red Banner (twice)

Nikolai Nikalayevich Biasi (Russian: Никола́й Никола́евич Биязи; 14 April 1893 – 7 April 1973) was a Soviet General, sportsman and writer.

== Early life ==
Biasi was born into an Italian family which had long settled in Russia. His grandmother, Daria Lebeda was a well regarded opera singer and a favourite of Glinka. His grandfather, Alexander Palme was a member of the Petrashevsky Circle and was subject to last minute reprieve from execution together with Fyodor Dostoyevsky.

Biasi was initially educated in at the drama school in Odessa and appeared on the stage as a child. He moved with his family to St Petersburg at the age of 12.

== Military career ==
He fought in the Imperial Russian Army during World War I and joined the Bolsheviks after the revolution. During the Russian Civil War he fought on the Caucasus Front and was one of the commanders of the railway guards.

From 1922 Biasi developed a career in military education. In 1922 he taught in the Infantry School in Tbilisi. From 1923 to 1927 he was chief at TVOKU in Tashkent. In 1928–31 he was director of military studies at Tomsk University.

Biasi was appointed Military Attache to Italy between 1936 and 1938. He was the founding Principal of the Institute of Military Interpreters and ran the institute between 1940 and 1944, during this time he compiled several military dictionaries. During this time Biasi was deputy to the commander of the Caucasus Front and led a special mountain warfare school. Biasi was appointed Lieutenant General in 1944.

== Personal life ==
Biasi was a keen sportsman. He competed at football, boxing, yachting, athletics, shooting and cycling at the highest level in Russia. He became target rifle champion of Russia, one of the first football referees in the Soviet league and a boxing referee at major championships. Biasi was proficient in 14 foreign languages and had a perfect command of French and Italian.

Biasi settled in Yessentuki, Stavropol Krai after his retirement.

== Sources ==
- Биязи Н. Н. Краткие сведения по технике опроса пленных — Воен. фак-т зап. иностр. языков, М., 1941. — 39 стр.
- Н.Н. Биязи. Боевые действия в горах.
- Н.Н. Биязи: Военный итальянско-русский словарь - Москва, Государственное издательство иностр. и нац.словарей, 1940
- Н. Н. Биязи «Записки старого спортсмена». Изд-во «Физкультура и спорт», 1965
- - page from Stavrapolskaya Pravda (Russian)
- - page from Kanminvody in Russian
