= Jēkabpils Air Base =

Airbase in Latvia

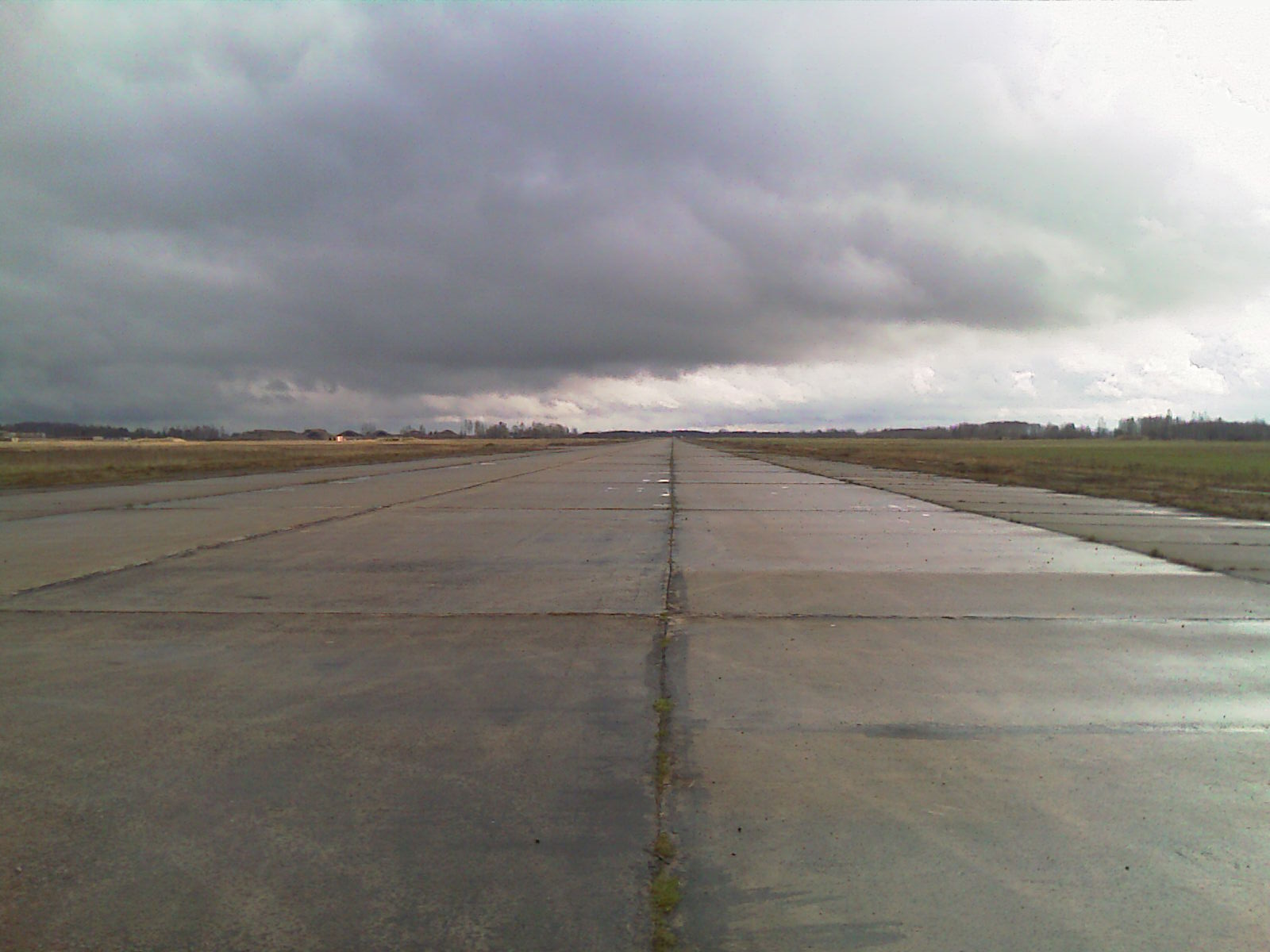
- IATA: none; ICAO: EVKA

Summary
- Airport type: Military
- Location: Jēkabpils, Latvia
- Elevation AMSL: 289 ft / 88 m
- Coordinates: 56°32′06″N 025°53′30″E

Maps
- Interactive map of Jēkabpils Air Base

Runways
| Direction | Length | | Surface |
| Direction | m | ft | Surface |
|---|---|---|---|
| | 2,500 | 8,202 | Concrete |

Jēkabpils (ICAO: EVKA), also known as Krustpils, is an air base located 3 kilometres (2 mi) northeast of Jēkabpils, a town in Latvia. During the 1980s it was one of 17 airfields hosting the Soviet Union's tactical reconnaissance aircraft regiments.

== History ==
Its exact founding date is unknown. Until the occupation of Latvia, the airfield functioned as the Krustpils airfield of the Latvian Aviation Regiment. Around 1935, a new reinforced concrete hangar and two-storey barracks were built. Before 1939 it was planned to open a Valsts gaisa satiksme air route Riga - Krustpils - Daugavpils, which, however, was not implemented. After the occupation of Latvia in 1940, the Gloster Gladiator fighters of the Latvian Aviation Regiment were redeployed here from Rumbula Air Base. During the Second World War, bombers of the Luftwaffe 1st Fleet (Luftflotte 1) were based at Jēkabpils airfield.

During the Soviet occupation, from 1962 it was home to the 886 ORAP (886th Independent Reconnaissance Aviation Regiment) flying Su-17 and Su-24MR aircraft. In 1984 the normal complement of the air base was up to nine MiG-25RB, 14 Su-17M3, 8 to 12 Yak-28R, and 3 to 7 MiG-21R. At the time, the aging MiG-21R and Yak-28R were being retired from service at the air base.

The 886th Regiment was subordinated to the 15th Air Army from April 1968 to 1977, then VVS Baltic Military district from 1977 to 1988, and then to the 15th Air Army again from 1988 to 1993. One squadron (Su-17M4R) operated in Afghanistan (Bagram Air Base - 34 56 45N, 69 15 44E) from September 1988 to January 1989. Several reconnaissance units would take turns operating in Afghanistan, and would be known as the 229th Independent Reconnaissance Aviation Squadron while being based there. The regiment was disbanded in 1993.

After the end of the Cold War and the restoration of Latvian independence the air base was transferred from the Latvian Ministry of Defence to the Council of Jēkabpils district. From 1993 to 1999 the airfield was owned by AS Jēkabpils lidosta. In 2000 the area was transferred to the state vacant plot fund. Buildings and communications, including ammunition depots, command points, technical and general purpose structures were privatized by SIA Reka, except for 500 runway concrete plates, which were distributed to the district municipalities. In 2004, the Latvian Police discovered a large warehouse with illegal tobacco products in one of the airport hangars, containing approximately 1,250,000 packs of smuggled cigarettes.

Around 2008, an asphalt concrete plant was built on the territory of the airport, and a wood processing company operates in the barracks buildings. In 2013, 7 or 8 demolished large warplane hangars and more than ten smaller hangars remained. Activists have made some improvements in recent years, painting navigational road markings, adding windsocks etc.
