= 372nd Fighter-Bomber Aviation Regiment =

372nd Fighter Aviation Regiment (1951-1960) 372nd Fighter Aviation Regiment PVO (1960-1977) 372nd Fighter Aviation Regiment (1977-1981) 372nd Fighter-Bomber Aviation Regiment (1981-1993)
- Active: 1951-1993
- Country: Soviet Union
- Branch: Soviet Air Forces; Soviet Air Defence Forces
- Type: Aviation regiment

Aircraft flown
- MiG-27; MiG-23

The 372nd Fighter-Bomber Aviation Regiment (372nd APIB) was a fighter-bomber regiment of the Soviet Air Forces and the Soviet Air Defence Forces (PVO). It existed from 1951 to 1993 and was based in Daugavpils until 1993, when it was transferred to Borisoglebsk and disbanded.

== History ==
The 372nd Fighter Aviation Regiment was activated in October 1951 at Daugavpils Air Base, part of the 336th Fighter Aviation Division. It was equipped with the Mikoyan-Gurevich MiG-15. The regiment became part of the 175th Fighter Aviation Division in December 1952. In 1956, it received its first Mikoyan-Gurevich MiG-19 fighter aircraft and had replaced the MiG-15s by 1958. In 1960, it received the Yakovlev Yak-25 and became a PVO regiment, subordinated to the 27th Air Defence Corps. The MiG-15 and Yak-25 had been phased out by 1966, when the unit received the Yakovlev Yak-28P.

In 1977, the regiment was transferred back to the Soviet Air Forces and became part of the Air Forces of the Baltic Military District. In 1981, the Yak-28P was replaced by the Mikoyan MiG-27 and the Mikoyan-Gurevich MiG-23UM. The regiment was redesignated the 372nd Fighter-Bomber Aviation Regiment and became part of the 39th Fighter-Bomber Aviation Division. Between July 1986 and June 1989, future Hero of the Russian Federation Sergey Borisyuk served as the unit's deputy commander. The regiment was equipped with 49 MiG-27s and 12 MiG-23UM aircraft, according to data from the Treaty on Conventional Armed Forces in Europe in November 1990. In 1993, the regiment was withdrawn from Latvia and moved to Borisoglebsk, being disbanded soon afterwards.
