= Ernst von Ratzeburg =

Master of the Livonian Order from 1273 to 1279

Ernst von Ratzeburg or Rassburg (died 5 March 1279) was a member of the Livonian Order. He acted as its Master from 1273 until his death at the Battle of Aizkraukle in 1279, at which he was one of 71 members of the Order to die.

== Sources ==
- (in German) Ritterbrüder im livländischen Zweig des Deutschen Ordens. Köln: Böhlau, 1993. Nr. 695 (lk 524–525).
- (in German) Theodor Hirsch, Max Töppen, Ernst Strehlke: Scriptores Rerum Prussicarum: Die Geschichtsquellen der Preussischen Vorzeit bis zum Untergange der Ordensherrschaft, Leipzig 1861, lk. 640
