= Naujene Parish =

Parish of Latvia

- parish of Latvia
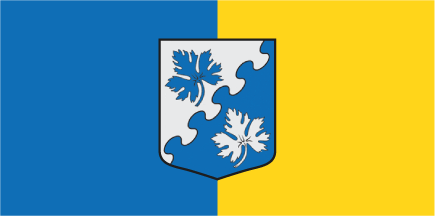
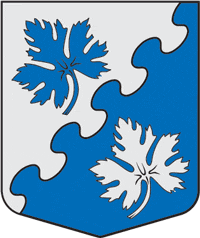
- Flag Coat of arms

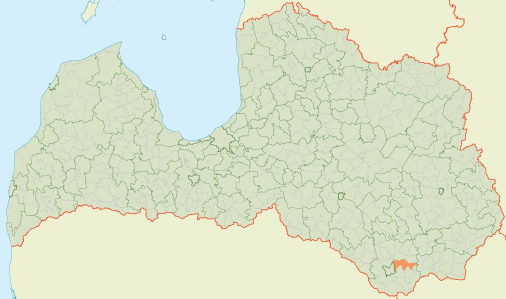
- 55°55′41″N 26°44′45″E

- Location within Latvia
- Country: Latvia

Area
  - Total: 129.42 km^{2} (49.97 sq mi)
  - Land: 125.09 km^{2} (48.30 sq mi)
  - Water: 4.33 km^{2} (1.67 sq mi)

Population (1 January 2026)
  - Total: 4,186
  - Density: 33.46/km^{2} (86.67/sq mi)
- Website: www.naujene.lv

Naujene Parish (Latvian: Naujenes pagasts) is an administrative unit of Augšdaugava Municipality in the Latgale region of Latvia.

== Towns, villages and settlements of Naujene Parish ==
- Lociki
- Slutiški

== See also ==
- Dinaburga Castle
