= Liepāja Special Economic Zone =

Coordinates: 56°32′N 20°59′E

- Industry: Port operations: cargo storage & transhipment, ship repair; Metalworking: machinery, steel structures & automotive; Textile: fabrics, lingerie, medical & hygiene products; Composite and plastics; Electromechanics; Aviation: International airport operations & pilot training;
- Founded: 1997
- Headquarters: Liepaja, Latvia
- Number of employees: >2500
- Website: liepaja-sez.lv/en

The Liepaja Special Economic Zone (Latvian: Liepājas SEZ) is the only special economic zone in the Baltics consisting of a seaport, industrial area and international airport. Liepāja special economic zone was established in 1997 to develop port operations, cargo handling, logistics, manufacturing and air transportation. The goal of the Liepāja SEZ is to attract investments for the development of the port, manufacturing, and creating new working places.

== Operations ==
Companies with SEZ status operating in the free zone have the right to the following tax exemptions:

Direct tax rebates

- 80% rebate on the applicable corporate income tax
- 80% rebate on the applicable property tax

Indirect tax reductions

- 0% rate of the Value Added Tax (VAT), applicable for virtually all supplies and services
- excise tax and customs duty exemptions

The Liepāja SEZ covers approximately 30 km^{2} (12 sq mi) which is almost 65% of the city's territory. The SEZ territory consists of:

- Port (3.7 km^{2} (1.4 sq mi) land territory, 8.1 km^{2} (3.1 sq mi) - port aquatorium). Industrial area of the town with a total area of 5.4 km^{2} (2.1 sq mi)
- Liepāja International Airport with a total area of 2.5 km^{2} (0.97 sq mi)
- Former military base Karosta with a total area of approximately 20 km^{2} (7.7 sq mi)

There are various business and industrial parks (VOBP, Liepaja Business Center, Lauma, Karosta Industrial Park, etc.), providing production facilities for business companies within the Liepaja SEZ territory.

== Legislation ==
The Liepaja SEZ was established by the Special Economic Zone Law on the Liepaja Special Economic Zone. The Liepaja Special Economic Zone territorial borders are specified in the Appendix to the aforementioned law. The Liepaja SEZ is also subject to the law of Ports of Latvia.

== LSEZ company investments ==
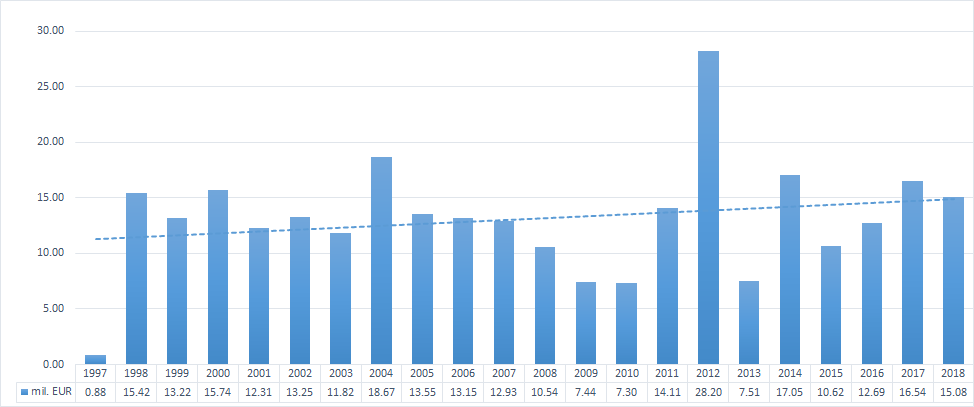
Investment of LSEZ companies year-by-year

== Achievements and recognitions ==
In 2019, the fDi Magazine, which is the flagship publication for the fDi Intelligence portfolio, and a publication from the Financial Times, granted the below mentioned awards to the Liepaja Special Economic Zone Authority:

- Investment of 45 million euros in the port infrastructure by the Liepaja SEZ Authority for dredging deeper access channels, and building new access roads and railway parks. These are just a few recent large-scale port development projects implemented by the Liepaja Special Economic Zone Authority. The Liepaja Port is the fastest growing port in the Baltic Sea region. In the last two years, the Liepaja Port, thanks to the efforts of the stevedoring companies, has made an increase of its cargo turnover by more than ten per cent and has reached a record cargo turnover of 7,54 million tons. Regular ferry line departures between Liepaja and Travemünde in Germany make Liepaja port a gateway for new German car deliveries to the Baltic states. The port stevedoring companies are building new warehouses, open storage areas and are able to provide multimodal logistics solutions, all of which have served as substantial background to award the Liepaja SEZ Authority with a certificate for Port Development.
- The Liepaja Special Economic Zone is commended also for infrastructure upgrades. Currently, there are five active business parks operating in the Liepaja SEZ, offering almost 400,000 m^{2} (4,300,000 sq ft) of production facilities. In 2019, the Liepaja SEZ received a 25 million EUR investment in port infrastructure. The investment was aimed at dredging the port waterway access canal and for the inner port to reach the depth of 14 m (46 ft), thereby servicing the Panamax type vessels. The investment also allows for the construction of a new berth to service the Panamax vessels, and implementing the breakwater repairs. Furthermore, efforts by stevedore and logistic companies that have ranked the Liepaja SEZ Authority among the specialism winners for Logistics include:
  - LSEZ SIA Duna having increased its warehouse area up to 8,700 m^{2} (94,000 sq ft)
  - LSEZ SIA, Mols L having increased its warehouse area up to 12,000 m^{2} (130,000 sq ft)
  - LSEZ SIA DanStore having increased its warehouse area up to 27,000 m^{2} (290,000 sq ft)
  - LSEZ SIA Baltex Bulk having increased its warehouse area up to 18,000 m^{2} (190,000 sq ft)
- Liepaja International Airport's integration with Liepaja Special Economic Zone, facilitating daily flights operated by airBaltic airlines. (In connection with the airport's runway renovation and upcoming technical training program, the air-Baltic Pilot Academy has decided to open a new flight base and aircraft maintenance center in the coming years to service Boeing aircraft. This is a result of complex and continuous efforts to attract long-term strategic partners for sustainable development of the airport of Liepaja, which has resulted in the specialism award by the fDI Magazine to the Liepaja SEZ Authority in Aviation.)
- The Liepaja SEZ Authority having developed a number of attractive employment programs, facilitating Liepaja SEZ tenants to engage skillful specialists and professionals. (For instance, the programs consist of a website vacancy promotion, promoting manufacturing companies to students (including site visits), as well as, the Latvian expats attraction program.) This has also been assessed and commended by the fDI Magazine for Workforce Amenities.
