= Slutiški =

Village in Latvia

- Village
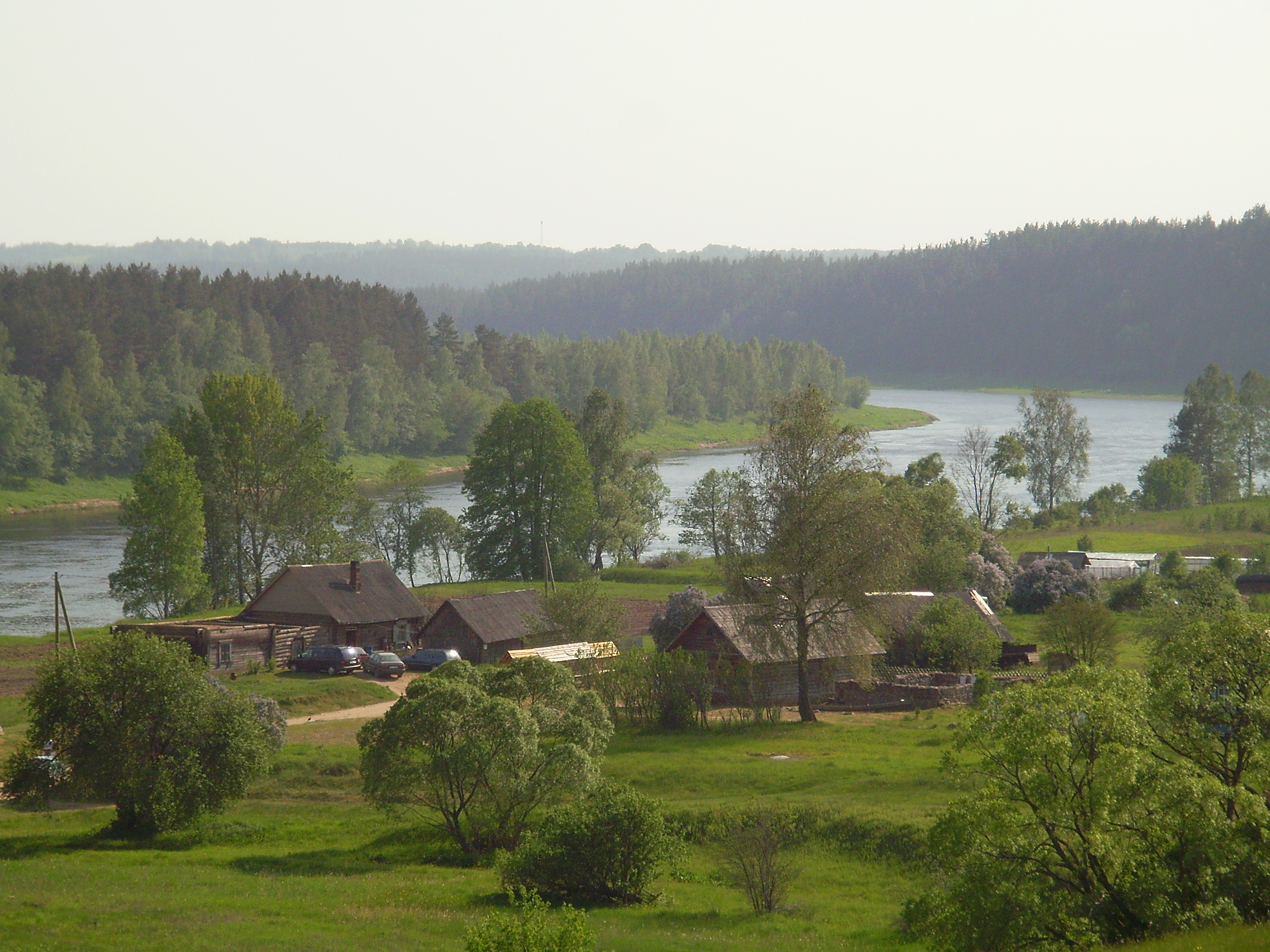
- Slutiški village

- Location within Latvia
- Coordinates: 55°54′48″N 26°53′03″E
- Country: Latvia
- Municipality: Augšdaugava Municipality
- Parish: Naujene Parish

Slutiški is a village in Naujene Parish, Augšdaugava Municipality, in the Latgale region of Latvia. It is located on the shore of the river Daugava.

== History ==
The village is known to have existed at least since 1785.

== Old Believers ==
Slutišķi village is home to a community of Old Believers, whose craftsmanship has put a distinct imprint on the village architecture with its elaborate woodwork influenced by traditional Slavic aesthetics. The village contains an ethnographic museum and a rural exhibition. The entire village is considered an ethnographic monument.
