= Grigory Vorozheykin =

Soviet Air Force general

- Native name: Григорий Алексеевич Ворожейкин
- Born: 16 March 1895
- Died: 30 January 1974 (aged 78)
- Rank: Marshal of Aviation
- Battles / wars: World War I Russian Civil War; World War II
- Awards: Two Order of Lenin

Grigory Alekseyevich Vorozheikin (Russian: Григорий Алексеевич Ворожейкин; 16 March 1895 – 30 January 1974) was a Soviet Air Force general and later Marshal of Aviation.

During the Great Patriotic War, he was chief of staff (1941-1942), and first deputy commander of the Soviet Air Force (1942-1946). On instructions from the Supreme Command Headquarters, he co-ordinated the Velikye Luki Operation. He ran in the operations of the Leningrad front and Volkhov fronts to lift the Siege of Leningrad, and took part in leading the aviation's actions in the Battle of Kursk. In 1944 - 1945 he served as representative of the Supreme Command Headquarters at the 3rd Ukrainian fronts and 4th Ukrainian fronts. After the war, he became commander of the 1st Air Army.

He was twice arrested during Stalinist military purges (in 1938 and 1948), but was released (in 1940 and 1953) and reinstated both times. He retired from the Soviet Air Force in 1959.

He was awarded many orders and medals.
