= 689th Guards Fighter Aviation Regiment =

Russian Aerospace Forces fighter regiment based in Kaliningrad

- 689-й гвардейский истребительный авиационный полк
- Active: 12.09.1939–present
- Country: Soviet Union; Russia
- Branch: (Soviet Union) Soviet Air Forces
- Type: Fighter aviation regiment
- Role: interception
- Size: Regiment
- Part of: 6th Air and Air Defence Forces Army
- Garrison/HQ: foundation: Kanatove (air base), Kirovograd / today: Chkalovsky (air base)
- Engagements: World War II, Siege of Odessa, Donbas–Rostov strategic defensive operation, Battle of Rostov (1941), Battle of the Caucasus, Crimean offensive, Lvov-Sandomierz Offensive, Battle of Berlin
- Battle honours: Guards

Commanders
- Notable commanders: Ivan Kozhedub

The 689th Guards Fighter Aviation Regiment (in Russian: 689-й гвардейский истребительный авиационный полк) is a fighter aviation regiment of the Russian Aerospace Forces today and originally of the Soviet Air Forces, which was formed at Kanatove (air base) in Kirovograd (Ukrainian SSR) and named originally 55th Fighter Aviation Regiment (in Russian: 55-й истребительный авиационный полк), abbreviated: 55th IAP (in Russian: 55-й ИАП) as initially part of the Red Army.

== Aircraft Operated ==
- Yakovlev Yak-1
- Yakovlev Yak-9
- MiG-15
- MiG-21
- MiG-23
- Sukhoi Su-27
- Sukhoi Su-27SM
- Sukhoi Su-35S

== Notable members ==
- Ivan Kozhedub, triple Hero of the Soviet Union and the highest-scoring Allied ace of World War II, commanded a squadron within the regiment.
- Alexander Pokryshkin
- Grigory Rechkalov

== See also ==
- Russian Aerospace Forces
- 6th Air and Air Defence Forces Army
