= Jelgava Air Base =

Airfield in Jelgava, Latvia

Jelgava Airfield
- Jelgava, Latvia in Latvia

Site information
- Type: Military airfield
- Condition: Abandoned

Location
- Location of Jelgava Airfield in Latvia
- Coordinates: 56°40′21″N 23°40′44″E

Site history
- Built: 1937
- Battles/wars: World War II

Airfield information
- Elevation: 20 m AMSL
Runways
Direction	Length and surface
09/27	800 m concrete plates

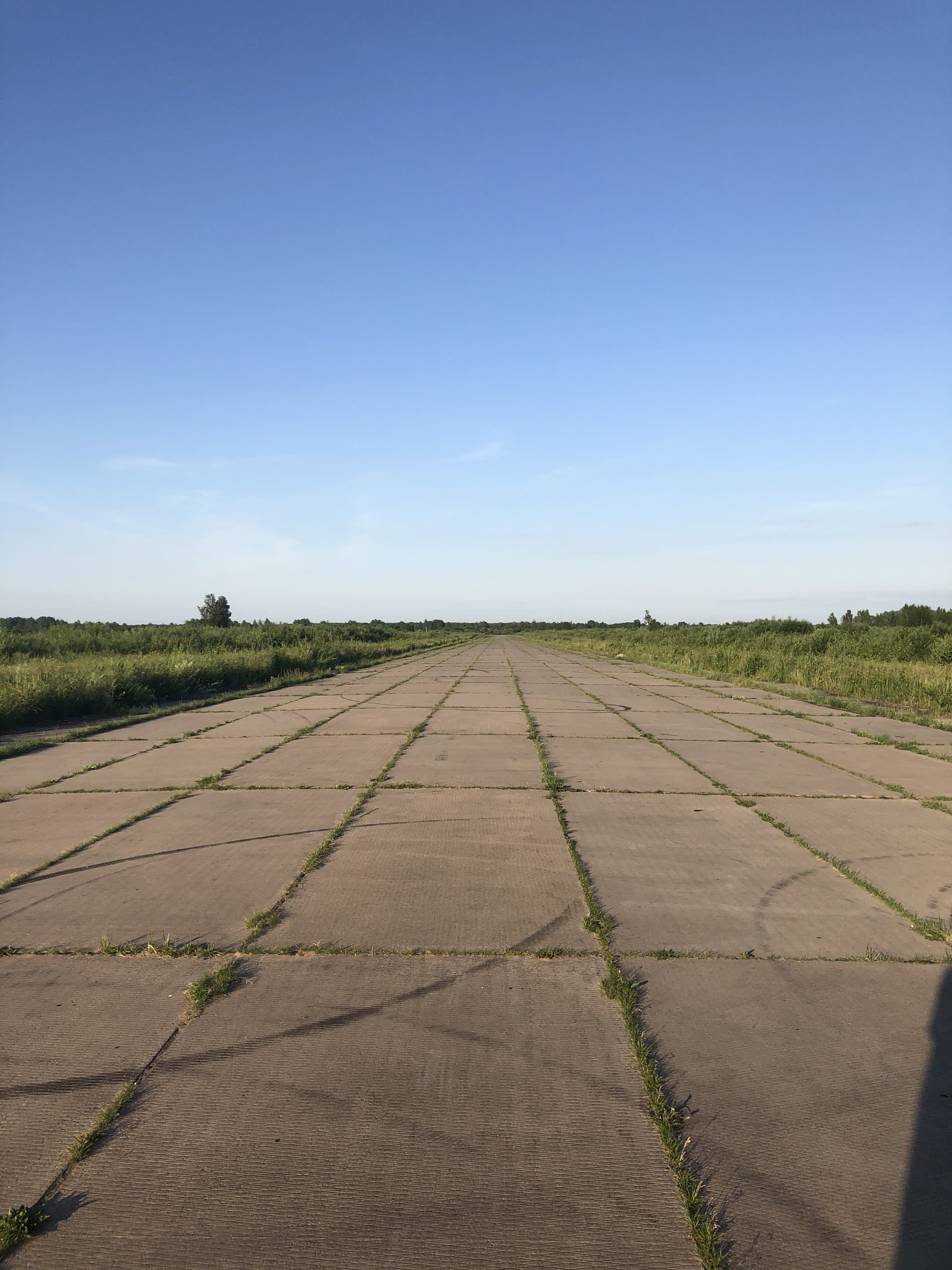
Jelgava Airfield June 2020

Jelgava Airfield (ICAO: EVEA) is an airfield in Latvia located on the north border of Jelgava, a city in Latvia. During Soviet times, it was a military forward deployment attack base, but now is used by general aviation.

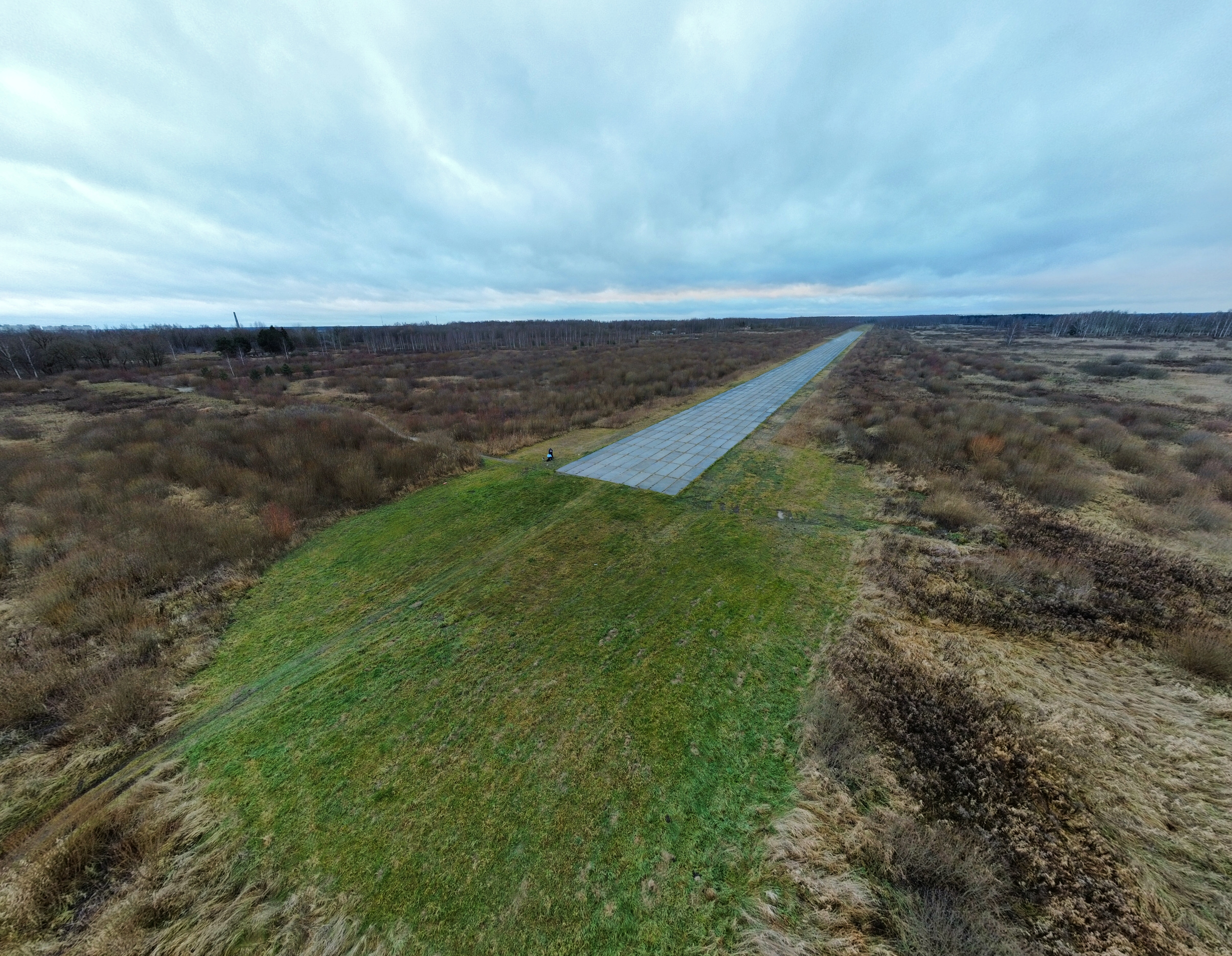
Panoramic of Jelgava airfield

Latest update on airfield condition: /10.04.2011: RWY surface is good, in some places small stones. Bushes at threshold RWY27. Can be used for takeoffs and landings.

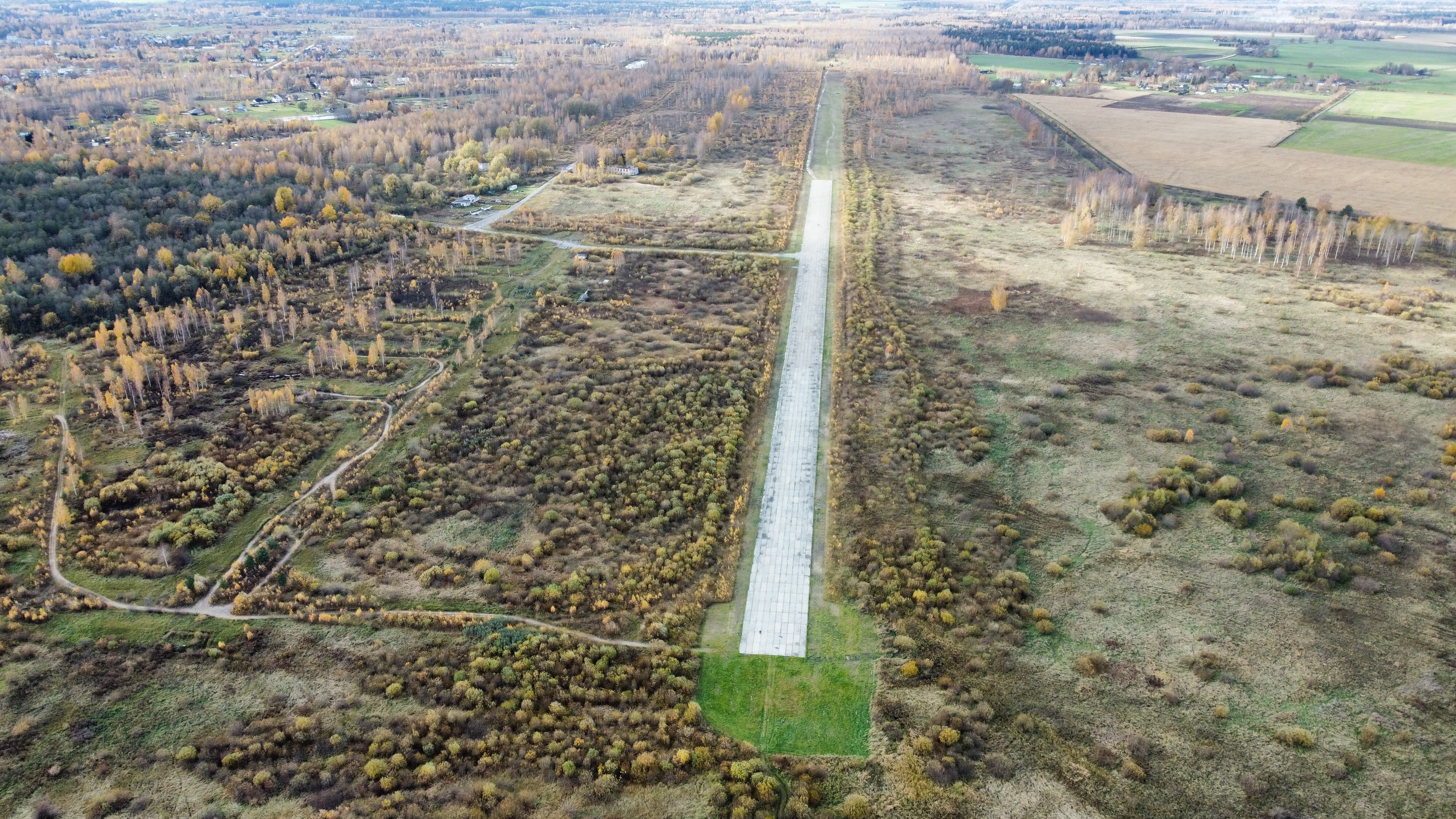
Panoramic Jelgava Airfield

Overview: Former soviet air force base. After soviet collapse used mainly by Rīgas Aeroklubs for parachute dropping and general aviation activities. The aerodrome was built with 2500m long runway, which was gradually shortened to 800m after the aerodrome was let to privatisation.

== History ==
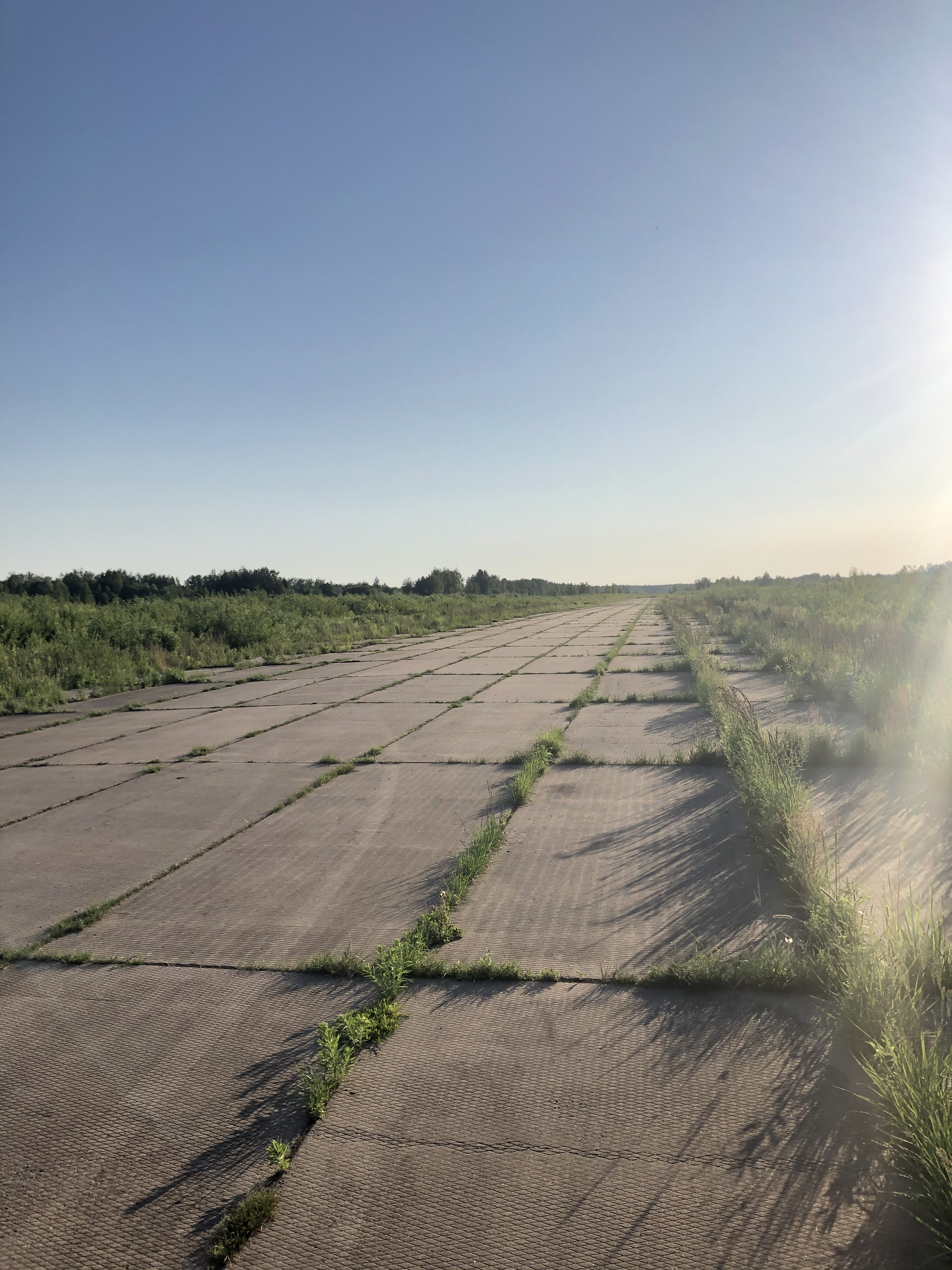
Picture taken in June 2020

Jelgava airport construction began in 1937 and finished in 1938. It was originally planned as civil airport, however, after Soviet annexation of Latvia in 1940 it became a base for Soviet military aircraft, and continued so after WWII was over. Since 1945, the airfield was used by various Soviet air force units. Air Base Jelgava was part of the first defense line of the Soviet Union. While Air Base Tukums was one of the main Soviet Air Force bases in Latvia for aircraft like the Mig-29 and SU-27, air base Jelgava was a backup base with one runway. The air base was maintained for possible backup and used for helicopters and some light aircraft. In the 1980s the runway was extended to be 2500 meters long and 45 meters wide to allow use by jet aircraft.

The 285th OVE REB (Russian Отдельная вертолётная эскадрилья Радиоэлектронной борьбы, Independent Electronic Warfare Helicopter Squadron) flying modifications of Mi-8 aircraft was based here from 1979. In the late 1980s Riga DOSAAF relocated to the adjacent field from Spilve and used it for skydiving and gliding sport. Due to Latvian independence, in 1992 the helicopter squadron was relocated to Lyambir air base near Saransk, and later dissolved. The airfield was since then used by general aviation, mostly skydivers and small aircraft. The skydiving operation was shut down in 2010 due to death of the dropzone owner. The same year, a larger portion of runway concrete was removed, shortening it to just 800 meters, and narrowing to 20 meters. Most taxiways and aircraft parking spots were also removed.

As of 2018, the airfield took up only a fraction of the former air base territory. Most of the territory is reclaimed by nature, and the majority of former military buildings are abandoned or collapsed. Some areas are also used for airsoft games and ATV riding. Today, the airfield is owned by the municipality, with overgrowth spreading over the concrete runway plates, leaving some uneven.
