= Ventspils International Airport =

Airport in Ventspils, Latvia

Ventspils International Airport Ventspils Starptautiskā Lidosta
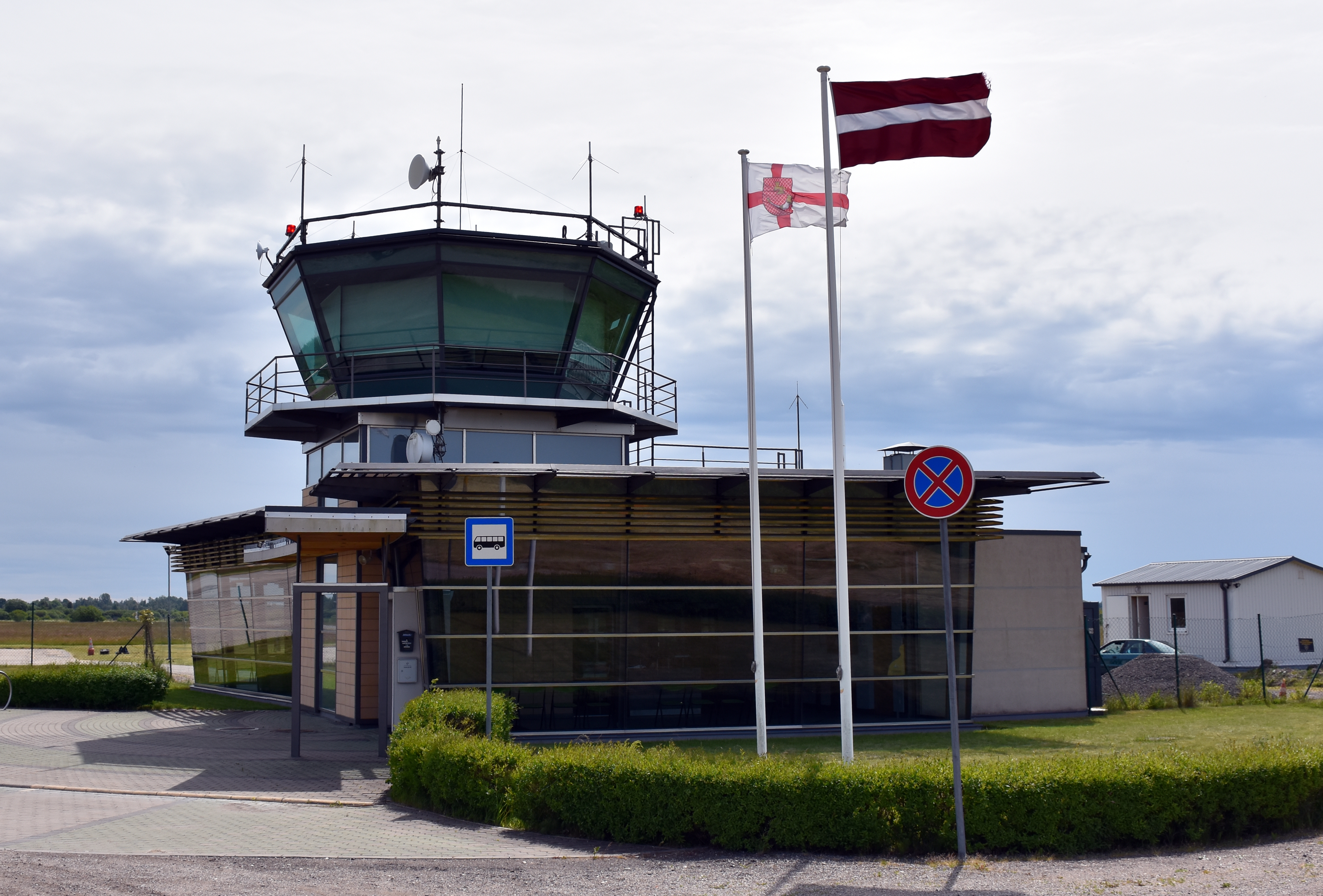
- The terminal building Ventspils Airport

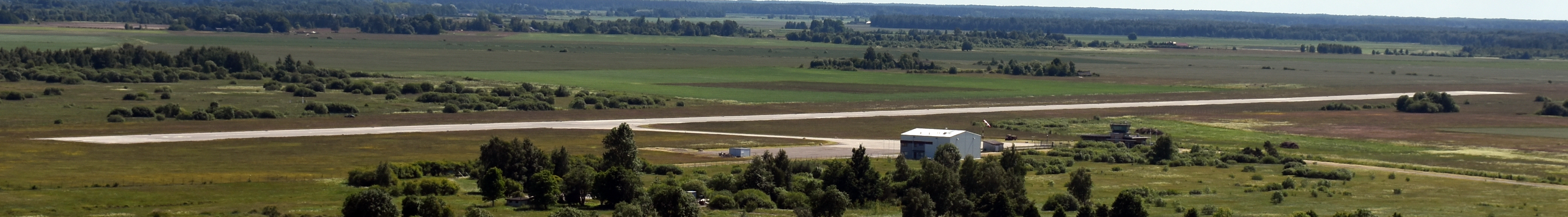
- The runway of Ventspils Airport
- IATA: VNT; ICAO: EVVA

Summary
- Airport type: Public
- Operator: Municipality of Ventspils
- Location: Ventspils
- Built: 1939
- Elevation AMSL: 19 ft / 6 m
- Coordinates: 57°21′28″N 021°32′39″E

Map
- Location of airport in Latvia

Runways
Direction	Length		Surface
Direction	m	ft	Surface
03/21	1,298	4,259	Asphalt

Statistics (2008)
- Number of Passengers: 7,894
- Aircraft movements: 476
- Source: Latvian AIP at EUROCONTROL

Ventspils International Airport (IATA: VNT, ICAO: EVVA) is an airport 2.7 NM (5.0 km; 3.1 mi) southwest of Ventspils, Latvia. It is the newest airport and, with Liepāja International Airport and Riga International Airport, is one of the three notable airports in the country.

== Overview ==
Ventspils Airport was founded in 1939. From 1940, it was used by Soviet Aircraft. Once 1975 an asphalt-concrete runway (1,298 m × 32 m (4,259 ft × 105 ft)) and an apron (100 m × 100 m (328 ft × 328 ft)) were built. At that time there was an air control dispatchers point at the aerodrome and 40-45 employees worked in the airport. The aerodrome was used by aircraft AN-24, AN-2, YAK-40, MI-2. The flight range was small and there were only two scheduled flights: Ventspils - Riga and Ventspils - Leningrad (now St. Petersburg).

In addition to commercial traffic, state departments used the airport for various reasons. There were state border control flights, flights for oil pipeline control, forest patrols, traffic control, fishing inspection flights and others. Airport operation ceased in 1983 due to political decisions by the government.

The possibility re-opening the airport was first discussed in the mid-1990s by which time Ventspils had become an important transport hub. The efficiency and importance of the re-opening of the Ventspils Airport was evaluated.

The main conclusions of this research were that the rehabilitation of the airport would enhance the efficiency of transport corridors and foster economic activity in the region. The region possessed all the social and economic preconditions that indicate potential demand for air traffic. An operational Ventspils Airport would promote competitiveness of the Ventspils transport hub in the European and global markets.

At the time the re-opening of the airport was being considered, people in the Ventspils region and corporate clients who wished to travel by air used the airport at Riga that was 202 km (126 mi) away from Ventspils. This added 6–8 hours of travel time to the airport in Riga and back by road. These opportunities did not satisfy the demand for air transport traffic.

Work on the project "The rehabilitation of the Airport Ventspils" began in 1997. Implementation of the project began in 1999. It was developed within the National Transport Development Programme of the Republic of Latvia (1996–2010).

At the start of 2001, all documentation for the airport exploitation was prepared and a modern security program was developed. The plan of safety improvements for security standards was followed by the equipping of the temporary passenger service building and establishing an electric security system.

The most important result of the activities was the start of operation in 2000 upon receiving the certificate. The certificate confirmed that the aerodrome was suitable for exploitation and the first programs of flights were for conclusion that the first cycle of Ventspils Airport development was completed.

On 11 April 2008, Latvian national airline airBaltic began the first regular service from the airport to Riga but ceased after few months due to low patronage.
