= Daugavpils International Airport =

Former airport in Latvia

Daugavpils Airport Daugavpils Starptautiskā Lidosta
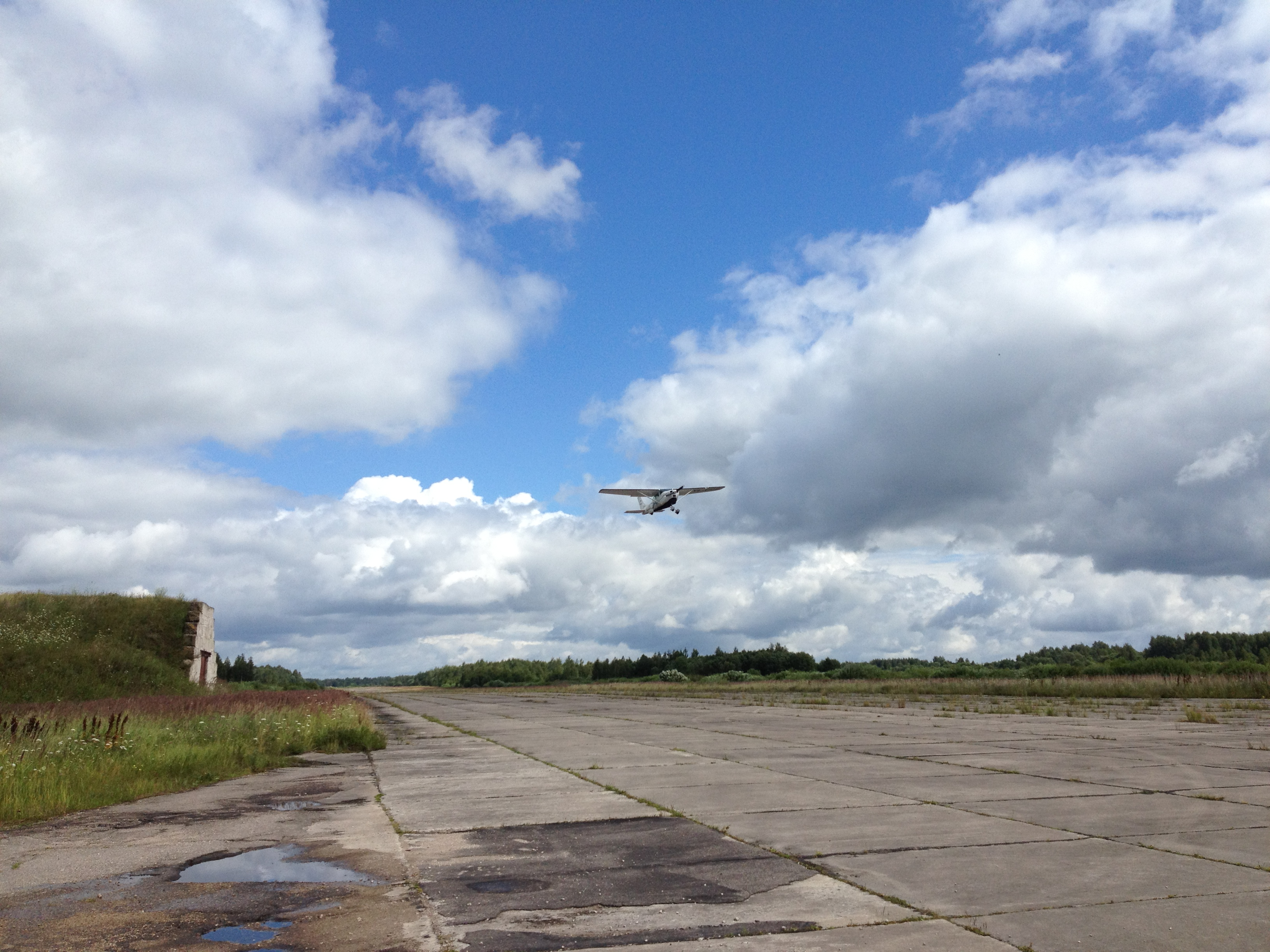
- IATA: DGP; ICAO: EVDA

Summary
- Airport type: Public
- Operator: SIA Daugavpils Lidosta
- Location: 122
- Elevation AMSL: 410 ft / 125 m
- Coordinates: 55°56′30″N 026°40′6″E

Map
- Location of airport in Latvia

Runways
Direction	Length		Surface
Direction	ft	m	Surface
02/20	8,202	2,500	Concrete

The Daugavpils International Airport (Latvian: Daugavpils Starptautiskā Lidosta) was located 12 km northeast of Daugavpils in the village of Lociki, Naujene Parish, Augšdaugava Municipality, in the Latgale region of Latvia.

All of the airport's technical infrastructure, runway, and buildings are what was left of the former Soviet military air base. The base was completely abandoned in 1993. Since 2005, the city council had sought to promote plans to redevelop it, but it was not able to obtain funding.

In 2021, the Municipality voted to terminate the activities of the Airport and start the liquidation of the assets. One of the transition plans involves creating an industrial park on the territory.

== History ==
In the past, the airport was home to the 372nd Fighter-Bomber Aviation Regiment flying MiG-23 and MiG-27 aircraft.

In 2005, Daugavpils City Council founded "Daugavpils lidosta" SIA (Daugavpils Airport Ltd.) to seek to develop the former military air base into Daugavpils International Airport. They planned to build by 2015 an international and regional airport in Daugavpils suitable for large-scale airplanes, which will allow for both international and domestic passenger traffic, international and domestic cargo transport, and charter flights. They had the intention to build a runway of 2500m in length and 46m in width. They also hoped the building of an international regional airport would lead to the further development of other activities in the area based on servicing the airport and its customers.
