= List of Estonian Navy ships =

List of Estonian Navy ships is a comprehensive listing of all ships that have been in service to the Estonian Navy. The list includes some small boats, but for small boats the list is not comprehensive.

== 1918–1940 ==
=== Destroyers ===
- Lennuk (Izyaslav class); formerly Avtroil in Russian and Soviet service; in service (Estonia):1919-1933; fate: sold to Peru and renamed BAP Almirante Guise, ultimately scrapped in 1954
- Wambola (Leitenant Ilin class); formerly Kapitan I ranga Miklouho-Maclay in Russian service, then Spartak in Soviet service; in service (Estonia): 1919-1933; fate: sold to Peru and renamed BAP Almirante Villar, ultimately decommissioned from Peruvian service 1954 and scrapped

=== Torpedo boat ===
- Sulev (A class); formerly SMS A32 of the Imperial German Navy; in service (Estonia): 1924-1940; fate: taken into Soviet Navy, renamed Ametist, scrapped in 1950.

=== Submarines ===
- Kalev (Kalev class); in service (Estonia): 1937–1940; fate: taken into Soviet Navy and went missing after not returning from patrol 1941 (that is, sunk somewhere, not known where)
- Lembit (Kalev class); in service (Estonia): 1937–1940 and 1994–2011 (symbolic); fate: taken into Soviet Navy and fought in WW2, later brought back to Tallinn as a museum ship, taken to Estonian Navy service (symbolic) after the end of the Soviet occupation, lifted off water and currently on display at Lennusadam museum inside the museum building

=== Gunboats ===
- Estonian gunboat Lembit (Gilyak-class gunboat); formerly Bobr of the Russian Imperial Navy, then Biber of the Imperial German Navy; in service (Estonia): 1918-1927; the first combat ship of the Estonian Navy, ultimately scrapped after 1927
- Estonian gunboat Tasuja (converted icebreaker)
- Estonian gunboat Mardus (auxiliary gunboat)
- Estonian gunboat Meeme (auxiliary gunboat)
- Estonian gunboat Ahti (auxiliary gunboat)
- Ilmatar (auxiliary gunboat); originally Russian civilian vessel Sofiya then taken into Imperial Russian Navy service (as Sofiya) and then taken to Soviet Navy (as Sofiya); in service (Estonia):1936-1940 (Estonian military service, 1920-1936 Estonian civilian service); fate: taken to Soviet Navy and renamed after a few months Plussa (so served the Soviets as Ilmatar also for a while), then taken to German service and renamed Ilmatar (again), then taken to Soviet service (again) and renamed (again) Sofiya, ultimately scrapped in the mid-1950s.
- Estonian gunboat Taara (auxiliary gunboat)
- Tartu (auxiliary gunboat)
- Estonian gunboat Uku (auxiliary gunboat)
- Vanemuine (auxiliary gunboat)

=== Patrol boats ===
- Estonian patrol boat Laine (former submarine escort ship)
- Pikker (Pikker class)

=== Minelayers ===
- Ristna (converted paddle steamer); originally Russian civilian vessel Apostol Paviel then taken into Imperial Russian Navy service as TSzcz No. 19 ("Minesweeper No. 19") and then passed through the Russian Provisional Government, Soviet (Bolshevik), and Red Finns service before being taken by Germans, White Finns, and then Finland who renamed the vessel No. 6 and decommissioned the vessel and it became the civilian passenger ship Pavel; in service (Estonia, as Ristna): 1920-1921 and 1927-1940 (Estonian military service, 1921-1926 Estonian civilian service); fate: taken to Soviet Navy, fought in WW2 and decommissioned 1955 and scrapped 1958
- Suurop (converted paddle steamer); originally Russian civilian vessel Apostol Piotr then taken into Imperial Russian Navy service as TSzcz No. 18 ("Minesweeper No. 18") and then passed through the Russian Provisional Government, Soviet (Bolshevik), and Red Finns service before being taken by Germans, White Finns, and then Finland who decommissioned the vessel and it became the civilian passenger ship Peeter; in service (Estonia, as Suurop): 1920-1921 and 1927-1940 (Estonian military service, 1921-1926 Estonian civilian service); fate: taken to Soviet Navy and hit a mine and sunk 1941

=== Minelayers/Minesweepers ===
- Kalev (Teplokhod class, later renamed Keri)
- Tahkona (Teplokhod class); formerly KM-4 of Imperial German Navy; in service (Estonia): 1919-1940; fate: taken into Soviet Navy in 1940, sunk 1941
- Olev, see et:Vaindlo (ship 1915) (Teplokhod class); formerly Teplohod No. 8 of Imperial Russian Navy and then Imperial German Navy; in service (Estonia): 1918-1940 (first as Motor Trawler No. 10 and the renamed Olev and then renamed Vaindlo); fate: taken into Soviet Navy in 1940, renamed KT-1501, then VRD-84 and then VRD-105, decommissioned and scrapped 1948
- Lehtma (Teplokhod class)

=== Landing ship ===
- Kalevipoeg (converted passenger ship)

=== Depot ships ===
- Ingerman
- Kotka

=== Auxiliary ships ===
- Kompass, see et:Kompass (laev)
- Mootorpaat nr 10, see et:Mootorpaat nr 10
- Sakala, see et:Sakala (laev 1886)
- Viljandi, see et:Viljandi (purjelaev)

=== Armored boats ===
- Kõu, see et:Kõu (soomuskaater)
- Maru, see et:Maru (soomuskaater)

== 1991–present ==
=== Patrol ship ===
- EML Admiral Pitka (A230) (Beskytteren class); formerly HDMS Beskytteren of the Royal Danish Navy; in service (Estonian): 2000-2013; fate: scrapped 2014.

=== Minelayers/Support ships ===
- EML Tasuja (A432) (Lindormen class); formerly KDM Lindormen of the Royal Danish Navy then MS Kristiina of the Estonian Maritime Academy; in service (Estonian): 2006-2016; fate: scrapped after 2021
- EML Wambola (A433) (Lindormen class); formerly KDM Lossen of the Royal Danish Navy then MS Kristiina of the Estonian Maritime Academy; in service (Estonian): 2016-present (commissioned ship); fate: in active service

=== Minesweepers ===
- EML Kalev (M414) (Frauenlob-class); originally Minerva of the West German Bundesmarine and then German Navy after reunification of Germany; in service (Estonia): 1997-2004; fate: decommissioned and put on display as a museum ship in Lennusadam museum
- EML Olev (M415) (Frauenlob class); originally Diana of the West German Bundesmarine and then German Navy after reunification of Germany; in service (Estonia): 1997-2005; fate: decommissioned and then sold in 2008, for sale as of 2025
- EML Vaindlo (M416) (Frauenlob class); originally Undine of the West German Bundesmarine and then German Navy after reunification of Germany; in service (Estonia): 2003-2005; fate: decommissioned and then sold in 2008, abandoned (as of 2026) in Hara harbour
- Estonia also received the Frauenlob class ship Loreley from Germany. She was used as a parts donor and not commissioned into Estonian Navy.

=== Minehunters ===
- EML Wambola (M311) (Lindau class); formerly Cuxhaven of the West German Navy and (after reunification of Germany) the German Navy; in service (Estonia): 2000-2009; fate: converted into a floating restaurant and bar at Tallinn
- EML Sulev (M312) (Lindau class); formerly Lindau of the West German Navy and (after reunification of Germany) the German Navy; in service (Estonia): 2000-2009; fate: placed on display as museum ship (Lennusadam museum), ultimately given for scrapping 2021 or 2022
- EML Admiral Cowan (M313) (Sandown class); formerly HMS Sandown of the Royal Navy; in service (Estonia): 2007-present; fate: in active service
- EML Sakala (M314) (Sandown class); formerly HMS Inverness of the Royal Navy; in service (Estonia): 2008-present; fate: in active service
- EML Ugandi (M315) (Sandown class); formerly HMS Bridport of the Royal Navy; in service (Estonia): 2009-present; fate: in active service

=== Patrol boats ===
- EML Wambola (M411), for information see et:Kondor-klassi miinitraaler and et:Sulev (laev 1972) (Kondor class); formerly Komet of the Volksmarine of East Germany and then German Navy after reunification of Germany; in service (Estonia): 1994-2000?; fate: decommissioned and scrapped
- EML Sulev (M412), see et:Sulev (laev 1972) (Kondor class); formerly Meteor of the Volksmarine of East Germany and then German Navy after reunification of Germany; in service (Estonia): 1994-2000; fate: decommissioned and scrapped 2000
- EML Grif (P401), see et:Grif (Zhuk class); formerly Soviet Navy ship Grif (R-67); in service (Estonia): 1994-2001 (1992-1994 in Estonian Defence League service as Erika or Edgar); fate: decommissioned 2001 and donated to Estonian Maritime Museum, on display at Lennusadam museum
- EML Leopard (P402), for information see et:Zhuk-klassi patrullkaater and et:Grif (Zhuk class); formerly Soviet Navy ship; in service (Estonia): 1994-2001 (1992-1994 in Estonian Defence League service as Erika or Edgar); fate: decommissioned 2001 and scrapped
- EML Ahti (A431), see et:Ahti (laev) (Maagen class); formerly Mallemukken of the Royal Danish Navy; in service (Estonia): 1994-2009 (first as Kaupo then renamed Ahti); fate: decommissioned and sold to private ownership
- EML Laine (A432), see et:Laine (laev 1986); formerly the fishing trawler Revalia in the Soviet Union; in service (Estonia): 1994-2000; fate: decommissioned and then fate unknown
- Mardus (A433), see et:Mardus (ship 1959); formerly Rylen; in service (Estonia): 1994-1998; fate: sunk in harbor 1998, raised and wrote off
- EML Ristna (P422), see et:Ristna (laev 1957) (R class); formerly Rihtniemi of the Finnish Navy; in service (Estonia): 1999-2005 (as patrol ship), 2010-2015 (as training ship); fate: given to Estonian War Museum 2005 and taken back to Navy service 2010 (although the museum retained ownership of the vessel) and again taken off service 2015, after some time (2015-2017 ship was used by Estonian naval youth cadets) the ship was scrapped around 2021-2022
- EML Suurop (P421), see et:Suurop (laev 1957) (R class); formerly Rymättylä of the Finnish Navy; in service (Estonia): 1999-2005; fate: given to Estonian Meremuuseum as a museum ship, on display at Lennusadam museum
- EML Roland (P01), see et:Roland (laev) (NAVY 18 WP class); Roland and Risto are two force protection patrol boats manufactured by Baltic Workboats AS. In December 2020, the Estonian Defence Forces received the two boats. In April 2024, Roland and Risto were donated to Ukraine. They were renamed Reni (Roland) and Irpin (Risto).
- EML Risto (P02), see et:Risto (laev) (NAVY 18 WP class); Roland and Risto are two force protection patrol boats manufactured by Baltic Workboats AS. In December 2020, the Estonian Defence Forces received the two boats. In April 2024, Roland and Risto were donated to Ukraine. They were renamed Reni (Roland) and Irpin (Risto).

In 2023 the naval fleet of the Police and Border Guard Board was merged with the Estonian Navy, meaning that the Police and Border Guard Board transferred its four sizeable sea-going patrol vessels (listed below) to Estonian Navy and retained only some smaller boats (and also retained 3 hovercraft).

- EML Kindral Kurvits (P6731) (Kindral Kurvits class); in service (Estonia): 2012-present (2012-2023 Police and Border Guard Board, 2023-present Estonian Navy); fate: in active service
- EML Raju (P6372) (PATROL 45 WP class); in service (Estonia): 2018-present (2018-2023 Police and Border Guard Board, 2023-present Estonian Navy); fate: in active service
- EML Pikker (P6732), see et:Pikker (laev 1995) (Pikker class); in service (Estonia): 1995-2025 (1995-2009 Estonian Border Guard, 2010-2023 Police and Border Guard Board, 2023-2025 Estonian Navy); fate: decommissioned and placed on display as museum ship (Lennusadam museum)
- EML Valve (P6745), see et:Valve (laev) (PATROL 24 class); in service (Estonia): 2008-present (2008-2009 Estonian Border Guard, 2010-2023 Police and Border Guard Board, 2023-present Estonian Navy); fate: in active service

=== Diving tender ===
- Lood (A530), see et:Lood (laev); formerly EVA-321 of Estonian Maritime Administration; in service (Estonia): 2012-2019; fate: donated to Estonian Maritime Museum in 2019-2020

=== Estonian Defence League ===
The Estonian Defence League has also had some maritime vessels, and even though these technically are not Estonian Navy vessels, as the Estonian Defence League is a separate organization from the Estonian Navy in the Estonian Defence Forces (Estonian Defence League and Estonian Navy are 2 separate organizations that both are under the command of the General Staff of the Estonian Defence Forces and Estonian Ministry of Defence), here are listed Estonian Defence League vessels that have served since the restoration of Estonian independence in 1991.

- Erika, also known as KL-101, see et:Erika (laev) (Yaroslavets class, see ru:Ярославец (тип судов)); formerly RK-134 of DOSAAF; in service (Estonia): 1992-1994; fate: sunk in harbor, lifted up and scrapped
- Ahti (Kostromitš class); in service (Estonia): 1995-2000; fate: scrapped (auxiliary boat in the Estonian Defence League Tartu malev)
