= EML Wambola (M311) =

1959 Estonian ship

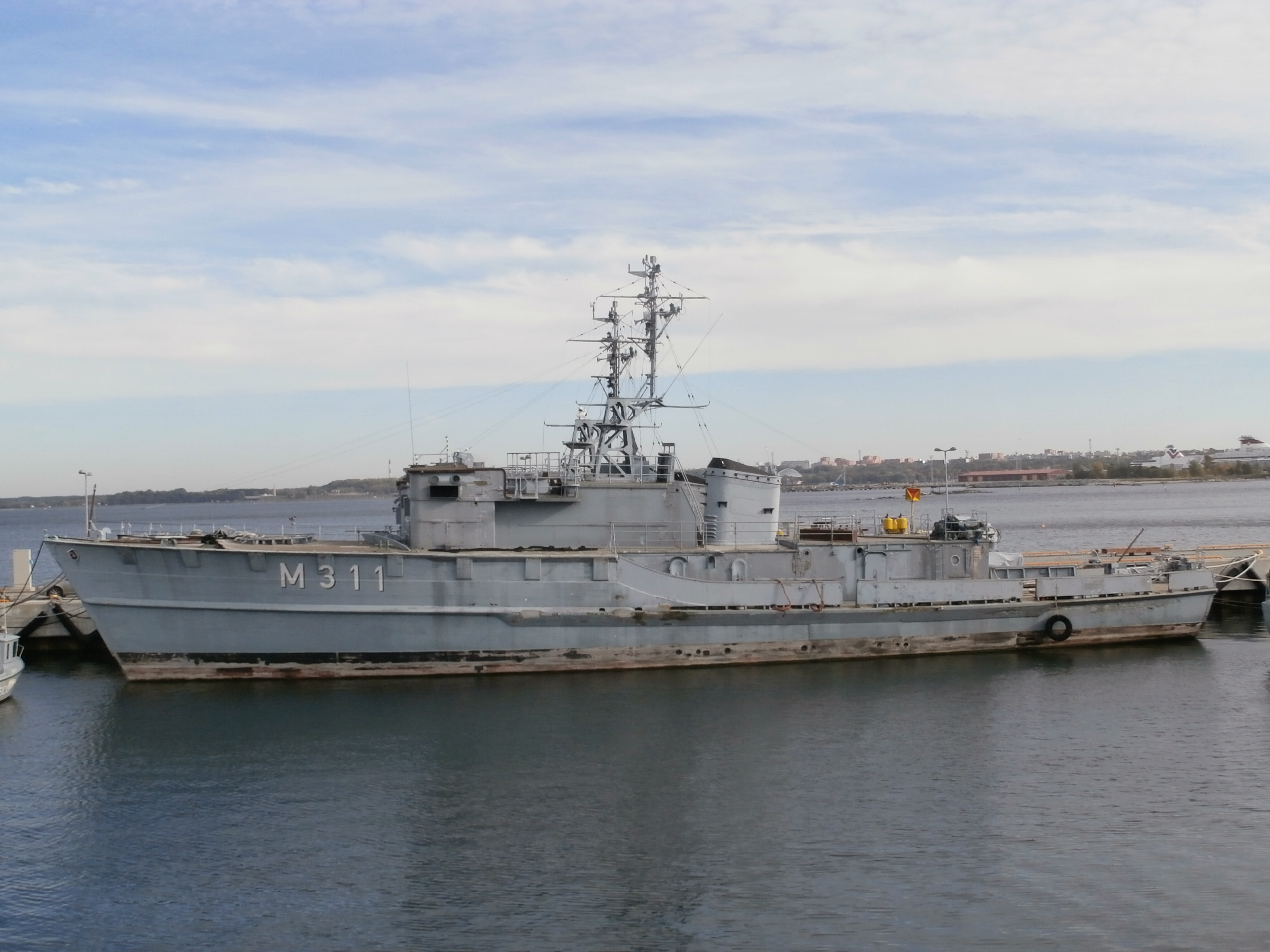
- EML Wambola (M311)

History

Germany
- Name: Cuxhaven
- Operator: German Navy
- Builder: Burmeister-Werft Bremen-Burg, Germany
- Launched: 11 March 1959
- Commissioned: 1959
- Decommissioned: 8 February 2000
- Fate: Sold to Estonia

Estonia
- Name: Wambola
- Operator: Estonian Navy
- Acquired: February 2000
- Decommissioned: 26 March 2009
- Motto: Ad unquem
- Fate: Restaurant ship
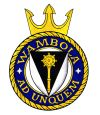
- Badge

General characteristics
- Class & type: Lindau-class minehunter
- Displacement: 495 tons full
- Length: 47.1 m
- Beam: 8.3 m
- Draught: 3.7 m
- Propulsion: 2 shafts propulsors; diesel drives; 2 × 1,470 kW Maybach MD 871 um/1-D drives; 5 × 70 kW diesel drives RHS 518 Dn 5
- Speed: 16.5 knots
- Range: 1,360 km (730 nmi; 850 mi)
- Complement: 6 officers, 31 sailors
- Crew: 37
- Sensors & processing systems: Navigation radar; Hull-mounted DSQS-11 mine-detection sonar
- Armament: 1 × 40 mm/70 Bofors automatic cannon; 2 × 12.7 mm Browning machine gun
- Notes: Mine counter measures equipment: 2 × ECA PAP 104 Mk.5 remotely controlled submarines (ROV) with explosives; contact-sweeper

EML Wambola (M311) was a Lindau-class minehunter of the Estonian Navy Mineships Division, formerly the German warship Cuxhaven. The commanding officer of the vessel at some point was Captain Jaanus Antson.

The minehunter Wambola was the first vessel of the Estonian Navy Mineships Division and also the first modernized Lindau-class minehunter. A black keel on a silver background with a golden battle-axe was on the coat of arms of the vessel. The battle-axe is a weapon used by the ancient Estonians which also symbolizes their fighting spirit and strength. The ships motto was the Latin "Ad unquem" which is in English "Onto the nail head". The coat of arms was designed by Priit Herodes. In 2000 a cooperation contract was signed between the Pärnu city council and the minehunter Wambola which gave the vessel a right to wear the Pärnu town coat of arms and to introduce the city in all foreign harbors across the world.

== History ==
EML Wambola (M311) was built in West Germany, in a Burmester shipyard in Bremen. The vessel was launched on 11 March 1959 and she entered service as Cuxhaven in the same year. The ship's name comes from the city of Cuxhaven in Germany. Originally Cuxhaven was a minesweeper but was transformed into a minehunter in late 1970s. The German Navy decommissioned Cuxhaven and one of her twin sisters Lindau on 9 October 2000 and gave the vessels to the Estonian Navy to operate. On the ceremony the vessel received an Estonian name Wambola. Estonian Navy decommissioned Wambola on 26 March 2009.

She has since been converted into a floating bar and restaurant Wambola Surf & Bar in Tallinn Harbor.

== See also ==
- BALTRON project
- EML Sulev (M312)
- EML Admiral Cowan (M313)
- EML Sakala (M314)
- EML Ugandi (M315)
