= EML Admiral Pitka =

1975 Estonian ship

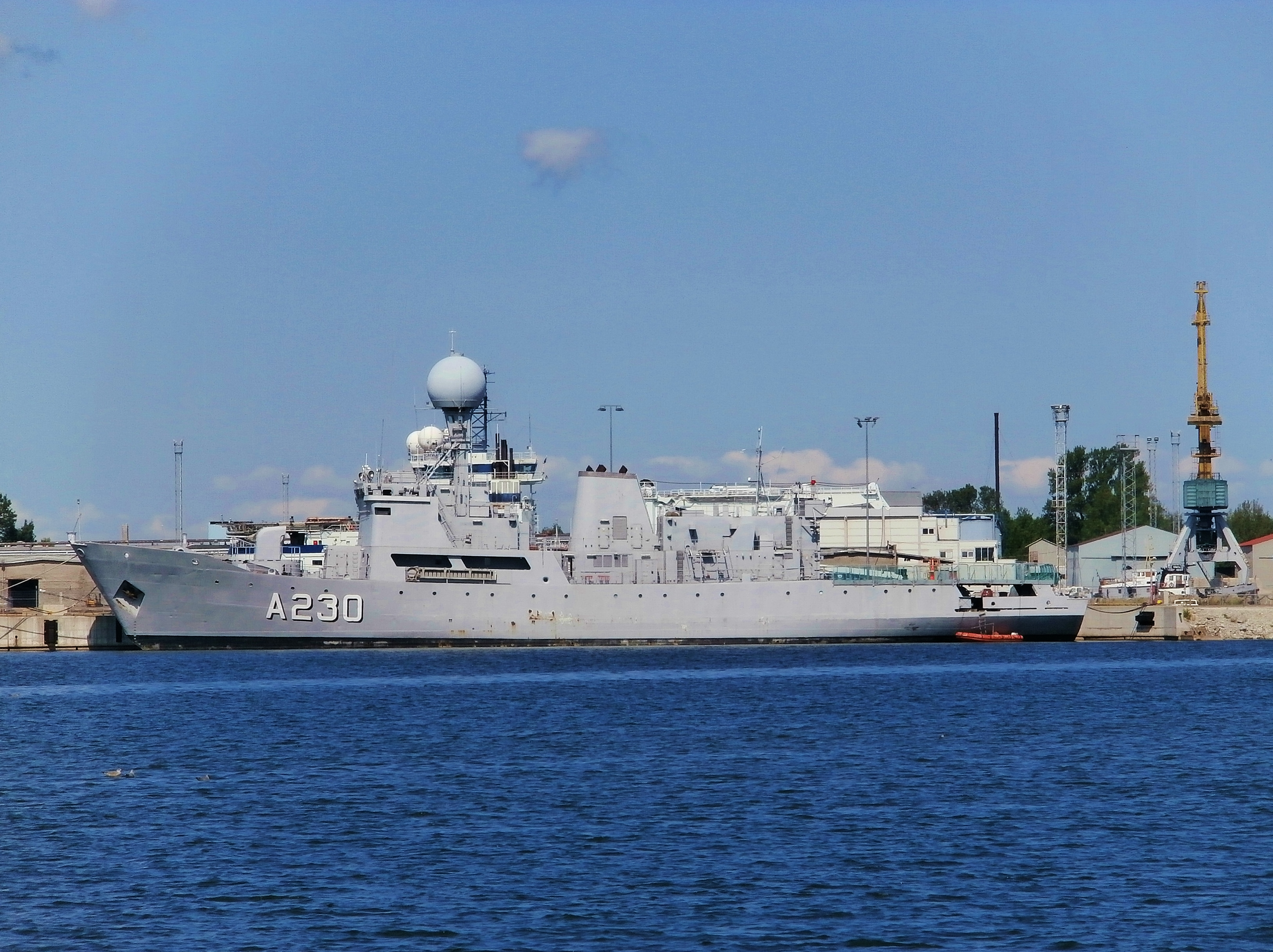
- EML Admiral Pitka in Tallinn, July 2013

History

Denmark
- Name: Beskytteren
- Builder: Aalborg Værft, Aalborg, Denmark
- Laid down: 15 December 1974
- Launched: 29 May 1975
- Commissioned: 27 February 1976
- Decommissioned: 21 November 2000
- Identification: Call sign: OUEK; Pennant number: F340
- Fate: Donated to Estonia

Estonia
- Name: Admiral Pitka
- Acquired: 24 January 2000
- Commissioned: 21 November 2000
- Decommissioned: 13 June 2013
- Identification: MMSI number: 276447000; Callsign: ESQF; Pennant number: A230
- Motto: Pro patria
- Fate: Scrapped, 2014
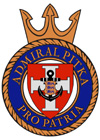
- Badge

General characteristics
- Class & type: Beskytteren class offshore patrol frigate
- Displacement: 1,970 tons full
- Length: 74.7 m (245 ft 1 in)
- Beam: 12.2 m (40 ft 0 in)
- Height: 21 m (68 ft 11 in)
- Draft: 5.3 m (17 ft 5 in)
- Propulsion: 3 B&W Alpha Mark 16 V23LU diesel engines (7,440 hp); 1 Ulstein Bow Thruster; 1 VP Propeller
- Speed: 18.5 kn (34.3 km/h)
- Range: 6,000 nmi (11,000 km) at 13 kn (24 km/h)
- Complement: 8 officers, 35 sailors
- Crew: 43
- Sensors & processing systems: 2 Litton Decca E (I-band) navigation radars
- Armament: 1 × 76mm K M/61 LvSa naval gun; 2 × 12.7mm Browning M2HB HMGs
- Aviation facilities: Helicopter deck for 1 medium helicopter.
- Notes: Strengthened for ice operations (A1 ice-class)

EML Admiral Pitka (A230) was a Beskytteren-class ocean patrol vessel and former flagship of the Estonian Navy, belonging to the Mineships Division. She was named after Estonian Admiral Johan Pitka. She was the first and only ship of the Beskytteren-class.

== History ==
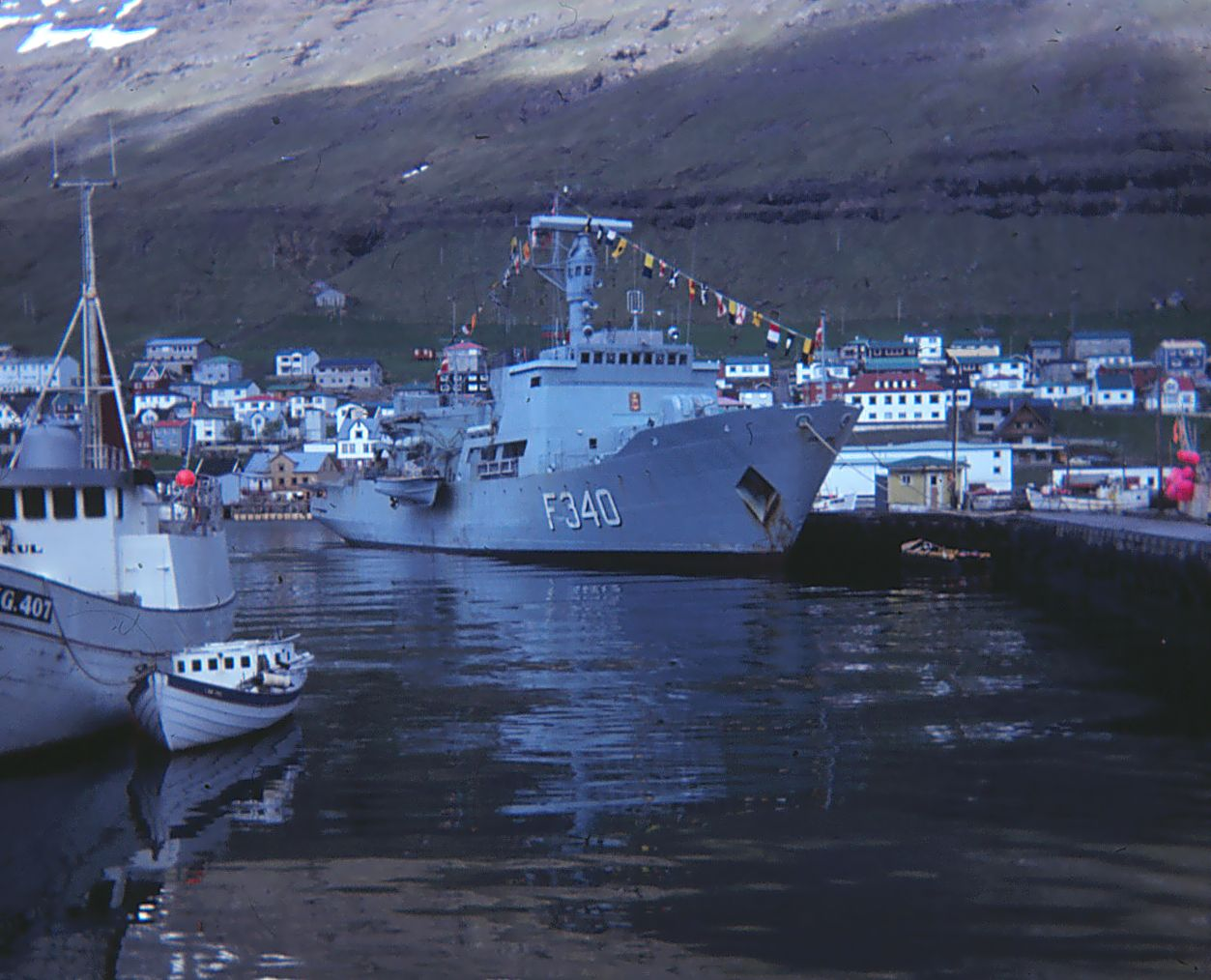
Beskytteren in Klaksvik, Faroe Islands, May 1979

As HDMS Beskytteren (F340) the ship, an improved version of the Hvidbjørnen-class patrol vessel, was laid down at the Aalborg Shipyard, in Aalborg, Denmark on 15 December 1974. She was launched on 29 May 1975 and entered service a year later on 27 February 1976.

The Danish Navy decommissioned Beskytteren in 2000 and donated the vessel to the Estonian Navy. The Estonian flag was hoisted on the ship on the anniversary of the Estonian Navy, 21 November 2000. The 75-meter frigate was at the time the biggest vessel of the navy. The EML Admiral Pitka served more than once as command ship with the joint Baltic mine countermeasures squadron BALTRON and NATO's mine countermeasures group.

The flagship of the Estonian Navy, the Admiral Pitka, was retired on Thursday, 13 June 2013, and the symbolic title of flagship passed on to the mine-hunter EML Admiral Cowan (M313). Navy Chief Captain Sten Sepper handed the vessel's flags and symbols over to the naval school that from now on has a classroom named after Admiral Pitka, military spokespeople said. Defence Chief Maj. Gen. Riho Terras said in his remarks at the retirement ceremony that the Admiral Pitka was the first unit of the Defence Forces to begin service under the NATO flag only a year after Estonia's accession to the alliance.

The vessel was to be given back to Denmark, but the Danes declined and the vessel was scrapped in 2014.

== Mission ==
The command and support frigate Admiral Pitka was the flagship vessel of the Estonian Navy and the Mineships Division and also the first modernized frigate in the navy.

The ship was a platform for the staff that conducts mine countermeasure (MCM) operations and exercises. The ship's responsibilities also included supporting other participating units with fuel, water, food etc. She was equipped with office and living quarters for staff members, as well as special facilities to provide medical support.

The ship was built in Denmark for North Atlantic and Greenland waters; therefore she has strengthened structure for ice operations.

== Traditions ==
The ship's Latin motto was Pro Patria, which translates into English as "For Fatherland".

The vessel's coat of arms was designed by Priit Herodes and Captain-Lieutenant Jaan Kapp and was donated to the navy by AS Falck Baltic, being presented during a ceremony on 21 November 2000. The colors of the coat of arms represented the knights' honor on the battlefield and also the connections and joint history between Estonia and Denmark. The shape of the cross pointed to the Estonian Liberty Cross and pointed out Admiral Johan Pitka's important role during the Estonian War of Independence.

In 2001 a cooperation contract was signed between the Rakvere city council and the frigate Pitka which gave the vessel the right to wear the Rakvere town coat of arms and to introduce the city in all foreign harbors across the world.

== See also ==
- Estonian Navy
- BALTRON project
- Mineships Division
- ENS Tasuja (A432)
