= EML Vaindlo =

1966 Estonian ship

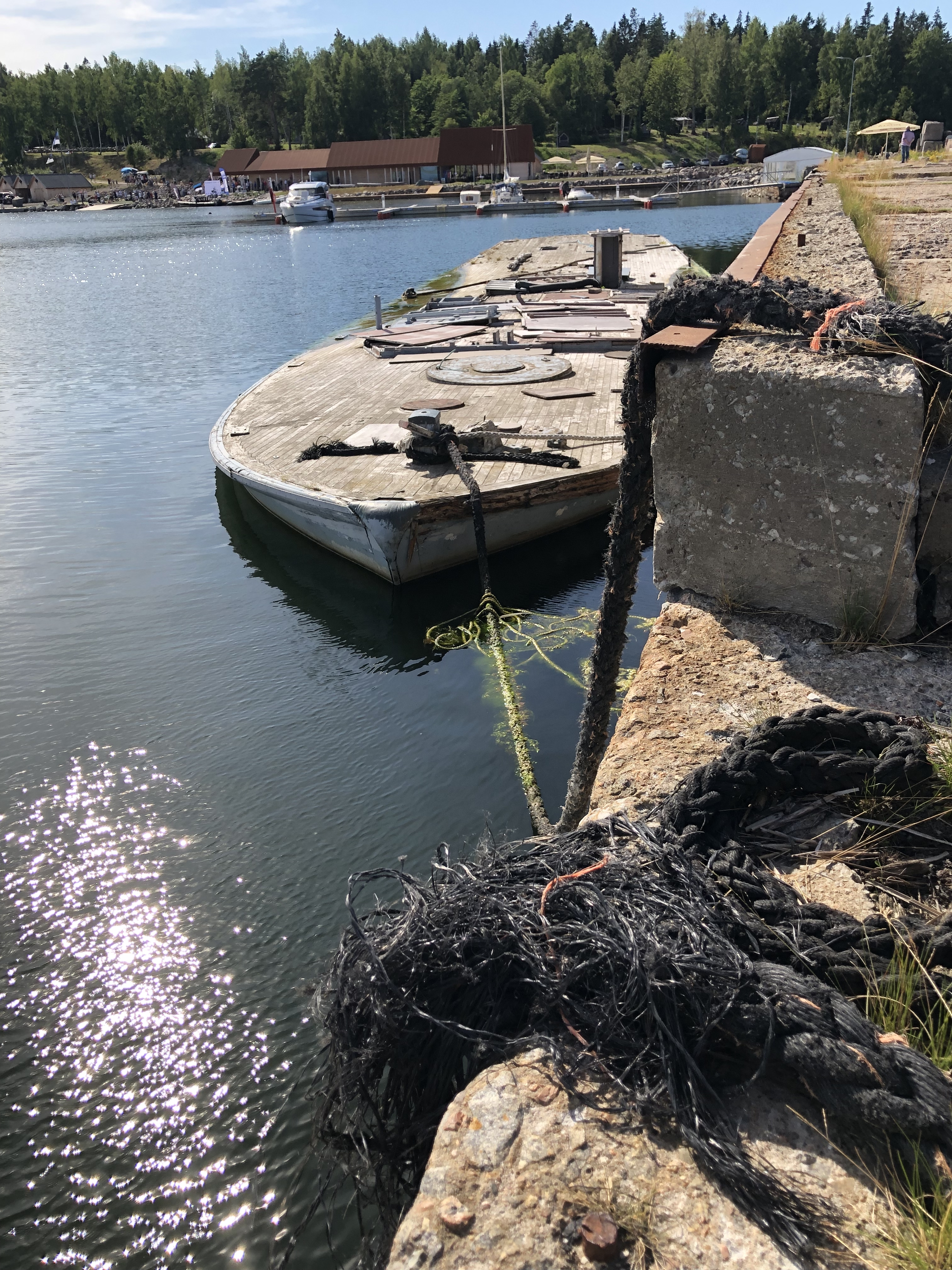
- EML Vaindlo (M416)

History

Germany
- Name: Undine
- Operator: German Navy
- Builder: Krögerwerft Rendsburg Germany
- Launched: 16 May 1966
- Commissioned: 1967
- Decommissioned: 2002
- Fate: Donated to Estonia 2002

Estonia
- Name: Vaindlo
- Operator: Estonian Navy
- Acquired: 4 February 2003
- Commissioned: 2003
- Decommissioned: 2005
- Motto: Memento
- Fate: Almost Completely Sunken in Hara Submarine Base
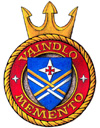
- Badge

General characteristics
- Class & type: Frauenlob-class
- Displacement: 246 tons full
- Length: 37.9.1 m
- Beam: 8.2 m
- Draught: 2.4 m
- Propulsion: 2 shafts propulsors; diesel drives; 2 MTU MB 12V 493 TY70 diesel drives
- Speed: 12 knots
- Range: 1,120 km (600 nmi; 700 mi)
- Complement: 6 officers, 19 sailors
- Crew: 25
- Sensors & processing systems: Navigation radar; Atlas Elektronik, I-band
- Armament: 1 × 40 mm/70 Bofors automatic cannon; 2 × 12.7 mm Browning MG gun
- Notes: Mine counter measures equipment: 2 × ECA PAP 104 Mk.5 remotely controlled submarines (ROV) with explosives; Contact-sweeper; Mine-laying capability

EML Vaindlo (M416) was a Frauenlob-class minelayer of the Estonian Navy and belonged into the Estonian Navy Mineships Division.

== Introduction ==
The minelayer Vaindlo was a vessel of the Estonian Navy Mineships Division and also the second modernized Frauenlob-class minelayer. A silver star cross represented the light tower on the coat of arms of the vessel. The light tower also symbolized the international connections between Estonia and her allies. The Red Saint George remembered the fallen British sailors in 1721, whose memorial plate is situated at Vaindloo island. The star cross was placed on Vihula´s municipality coat of arms and combined with the golden and silver lines they represented the ancient Estonian agriculture. The ship's motto was in Latin "Memento" which means in English "Remember". The coat of arms was designed by Priit Herodes. In 2003 a cooperation contract was signed between the Kunda city council and the minelayer Vaindlo which gave the vessel a right to wear the Kunda town coat of arms and to introduce the city in all foreign harbors across the world.

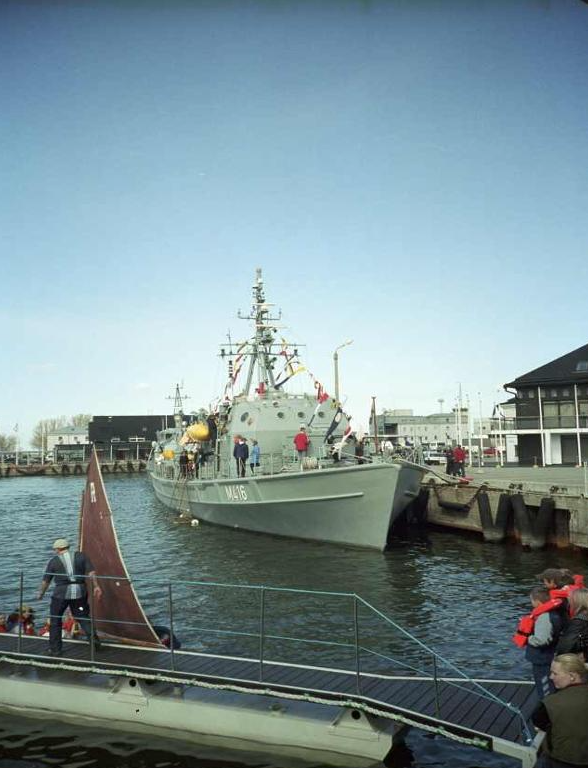
EML Vaindlo in Tallinn, 2002

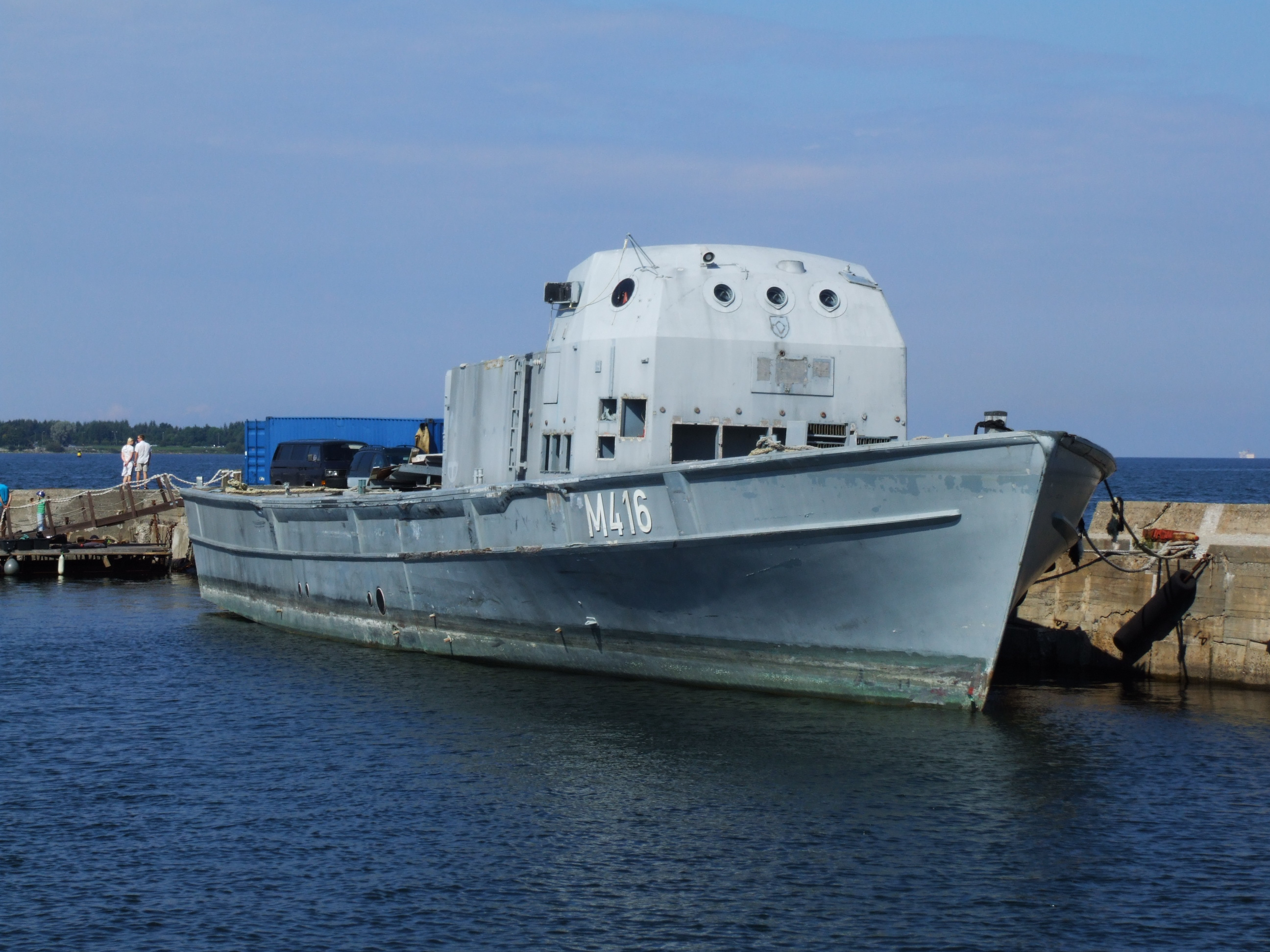
Minesweeper M416 Vaindlo in 2012

== History ==
EML Vaindlo (M416) was built in West-Germany, at the Krögerwerft shipyard in Rendsburg for the Bundesmarine as Undine. The vessel was launched on the 16 May 1966 and entered service a year later in 1967. The German Navy decommissioned her in 2002 and gave the ship to the Estonian Navy who renamed her Vaindlo. Vaindlo was decommissioned with EML Olev in 2005. Then they were sold in 2008 to private owners, they both stood "abandoned" in Tallinn Seaplane Harbor till Vaindlo was towed to Hara Submarine Base in 2018. Then she was stripped of her superstructure in 2020. In 2022 she was half sunken in Hara harbour. As of summer 2026, the hull of Vaindlo remains next to the pier at the former Hara Submarine Base almost completely submerged.

== See also ==
- BALTRON project
- EML Kalev (M414)
- EML Olev (M415)
