= Vark (disambiguation) =

Vark is an Indian confectionery garnish.

Vark may also refer to:

- Vark, Afghanistan, a village in Badakhshan Province in north-eastern Afghanistan
- Värk, an Estonian-language surname
- VARK, a model of learning styles
- A nickname for the F-111 Aardvark

== See also ==
- Warraq (disambiguation)
