= EML Tasuja =

1977 Estonian ship

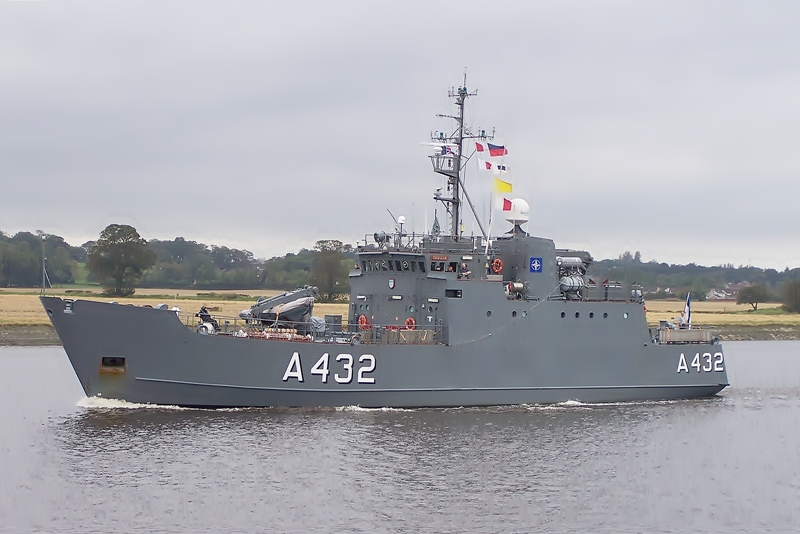
- EML Tasuja (A432)

History

Denmark
- Name: Lindormen
- Operator: Danish Navy
- Builder: Svendborg Skibsværft, Denmark
- Laid down: 2 February 1977
- Launched: 7 June 1977
- Commissioned: 14 June 1978
- Decommissioned: 22 October 2004
- Refit: 2001
- Home port: Flådestation Frederikshavn
- Fate: Sold to Estonia

Estonia
- Name: Tasuja
- Operator: Estonian Navy
- Acquired: 12 April 2006
- Decommissioned: 1 November 2016
- Identification: Call sign: ESQH; MMSI number: 276642000
- Motto: More Maiorum
- Fate: Scrapped
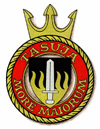
- Badge

General characteristics
- Class & type: Lindormen-class diving vessel
- Displacement: 577 tons full
- Length: 44.5 m (146 ft 0 in)
- Beam: 9.0 m (29 ft 6 in)
- Height: 21 m (68 ft 11 in)
- Draught: 2.9 m (9 ft 6 in)
- Propulsion: 2 × 1,200 kW (1,600 hp) Frichs diesel-engines; 800 Hps (600 kW) each; 2 ea adjustable propellers
- Speed: 14 knots (26 km/h; 16 mph)
- Troops: 35
- Complement: 5 officers, 22 sailors
- Sensors & processing systems: navigation radar; 2 × Litton Decca E, I-band
- Armament: 2 × 12.7 mm Browning machine guns
- Armour: steel
- Notes: This class is specially designed to lay controlled minefields.; Limited fueling capability on the sea.

EML Tasuja (A432) was a Lindormen-class diving vessel built in 1977. She served in the Danish Navy as KDM Lindormen until 2004. Handed over to the Estonian Navy, she was commissioned as EML Tasuja in the Mineships Division until 2016.

== History ==
Lindormen was the first of two similar minelaying ships built at the Svendborg Skibsværft shipyard for the Danish Navy. She was launched on 7 June 1977 as KDM Lindormen (English: The Dragon). After fitting out, she entered service a year later on 14 June 1978.

Lindormen was refitted at Søby Værft (shipyard), Denmark, in 2001. Decommissioned in 2004, she was handed over to the Estonian Navy. She was renamed EML Tasuja and served as a tender and utility vessel for the young navy. Her sister ship, KDM Lossen (English: Lynx), was also donated by Denmark two years later in 2006, but not directly to the Estonian Navy. The ex-Lossen began serving with the Estonian Maritime Academy as a civilian training vessel named: MS Kristiina, for new marine officers.

EML Tasuja was used on active duty as the naval diving vessel of the Estonian Mineships Division, while her sister ship was held in reserve and used for training. On 1 November 2016, after 10-years of active duty, the Merevägi decommissioned Tasuja. Shortly thereafter they took her sister ship (in Danish service: Lossen, then Estonian Kristiina) out of reserve and commissioned her into active duty as EML Wambola (A433) as her replacement.

From 2016 to 2021 EML Tasula was moored at Tallinn Miinisadam harbour and served as a reserve and training ship. After this the ship was scrapped.

== Ship's crest ==
The coat of arms for Tasuja was presented at a ceremony on 12 April 2006. A silver sword was in the center of the vessel's coat of arms. The sword points to Tasuja's importance during the ancient Estonian Freedom Fight in the 13th century AD and the historical Estonian Navy vessels Tasuja role during the Estonian War of Independence. The ship's Latin motto was "More Maiorum" (English: As our forefathers). The coat of arms was designed by Priit Herodes. On 8 July 2006 a contract was signed between the vessel and Kunda city council, giving Tasuja the right to wear the Kunda town coat of arms and to engage in promotion of the city in all foreign harbours across the world.

== See also ==
- BALTRON project
- EML Admiral Pitka (A230)
