= EML Kalev (M414) =

1966 Estonian ship

Coordinates: 59.452806°N 24.735455°E

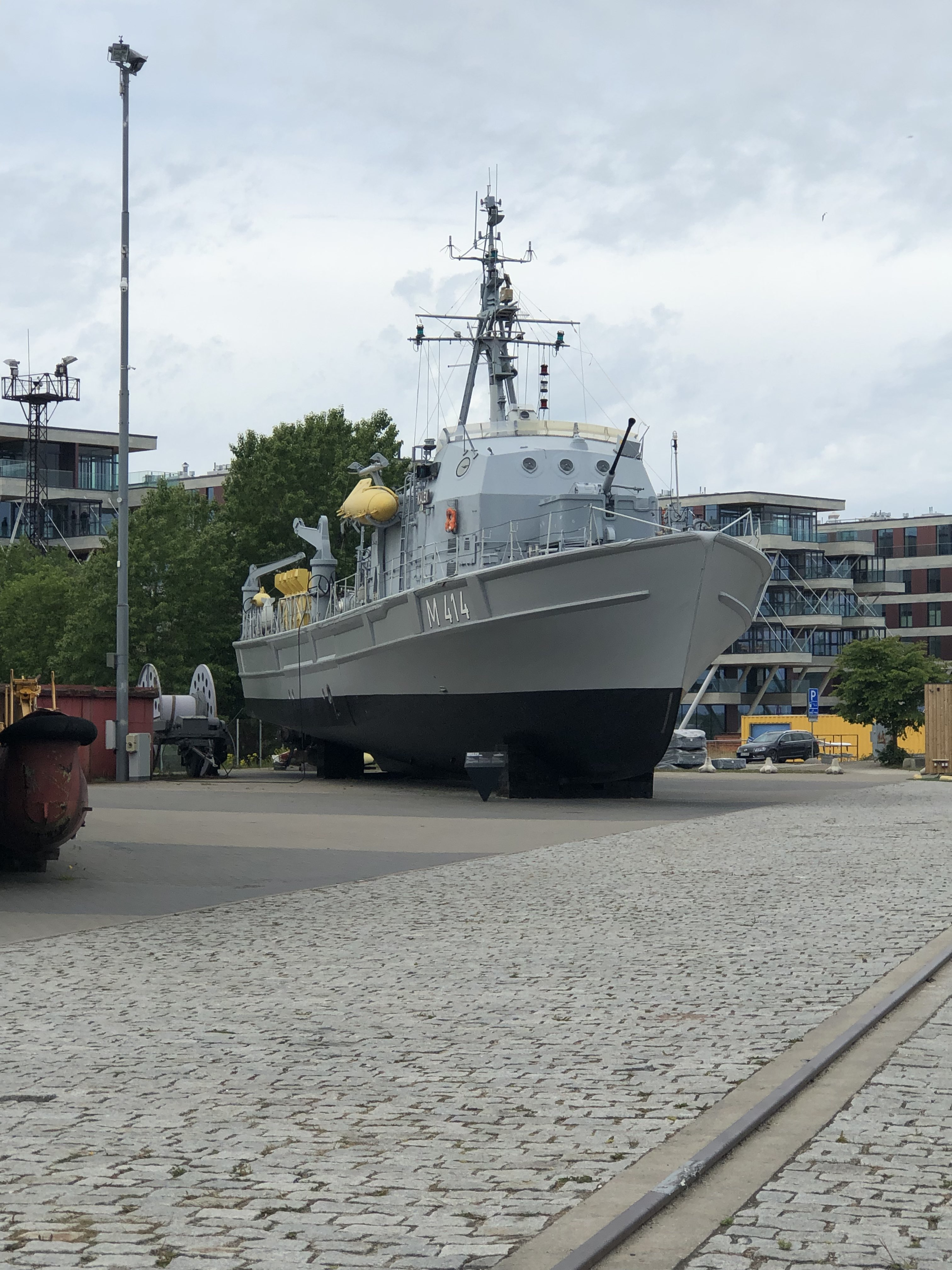
- EML Kalev M414

History

Germany
- Name: Minerva
- Operator: German Navy
- Builder: Krögerwerft, Rendsburg, Germany
- Launched: 25 August 1966
- Commissioned: 16 June 1967
- Decommissioned: 16 February 1995
- Fate: Donated to Estonia

Estonia
- Name: Kalev
- Operator: Estonian Navy
- Acquired: 5 September 1997
- Decommissioned: 2004
- Status: On display at the Estonian Maritime Museum since 2004

General characteristics
- Class & type: Frauenlob-class
- Displacement: 246 tons full
- Length: 37.91 m (124.4 ft)
- Beam: 8.2 m (27 ft)
- Draught: 2.4 m (7 ft 10 in)
- Propulsion: 2 MTU MB 12V 493 TY70 diesel drives; 2 shafts
- Speed: 12 knots (22 km/h; 14 mph)
- Range: 1,120 km (600 nmi)
- Complement: 6 officers, 19 sailors
- Crew: 25
- Sensors & processing systems: Navigation radar; Atlas Elektronik, I-band
- Armament: 1 × 40 mm/70 Bofors automatic cannon; 2 × 12.7 mm Browning machine guns
- Notes: Mine-laying capability

EML Kalev (M414) was a Frauenlob-class of the Estonian Navy which belonged to the Mineships Division.

== Introduction ==
The minesweeper Kalev was a vessel in the Estonian Navy Mineships Division and also the first modernized Frauenlob-class minesweeper. At the beginning of 2004 the Kalev was discharged from service and transferred to the Estonian Maritime Museum.

== History ==
The EML Kalev (M414) was built in West Germany, in the Krögerwerft shipyard in Rendsburg. The vessel, originally named Minerva, was launched on 25 August 1966 and entered service on 16 June 1967. It was one of ten ships of class 394 with the home port of Neustadt in Holstein. The German Navy decommissioned five of these ships in 1995; Minerva (Kalev) and her sister Diana (Olev) were given to the Estonian Navy to operate. At the handing over ceremony the vessel received the Estonian name Kalev. The third sister Undine was handed over to the Estonian Navy in 2001 as Vaindlo. In 2004 the Estonian Navy decommissioned the ships and Kalev was handed to the Estonian Maritime Museum in Tallinn.

== See also ==
- Baltic Naval Squadron
