= List of ship decommissionings in 2004 =

The list of ship decommissionings in 2004 includes a chronological list of all ships decommissioned in 2004.

	Operator	Ship	Flag	Class and type	Fate	Other notes
17 August	Royal Navy	Sir Percivale		Round Table-class landing ship logistics	Scrapped	
25 August	United States Navy	Thorn		Spruance-class destroyer	Sunk as a target	
30 August	United States Navy	Valley Forge		Ticonderoga-class cruiser	Sunk as a target	
10 September	United States Navy	Portsmouth		Los Angeles-class submarine	Nuclear submarine recycling	
24 September	United States Navy	O'Brien		Spruance-class destroyer	Sunk as a target	
30 September	United States Navy	Ticonderoga		Ticonderoga-class cruiser	Inactive	Ship's Maintenance Facility in Philadelphia, Pennsylvania
1 October	United States Navy	Fletcher		Spruance-class destroyer	Sunk as a target	
1 October	United States Navy	Sacramento		Sacramento-class fast combat support ship	Scrapped	
14 October	United States Navy	Parche		Sturgeon-class submarine	Nuclear submarine recycling	
19 October	Royal Navy	Sandown		Sandown-class minehunter	Sold to Estonia	
25 October	Royal Navy	Glasgow		Type 42 destroyer	Scrapped	
5 November	Royal Navy	Newcastle		Type 42 destroyer	Scrapped	
15 November	Royal Navy	Inverness		Sandown-class minehunter	Sold to Estonia	
3 December	United States Navy	Yorktown		Ticonderoga-class cruiser	Awaiting disposal	
