= EML Admiral Cowan =

1988 Estonian ship

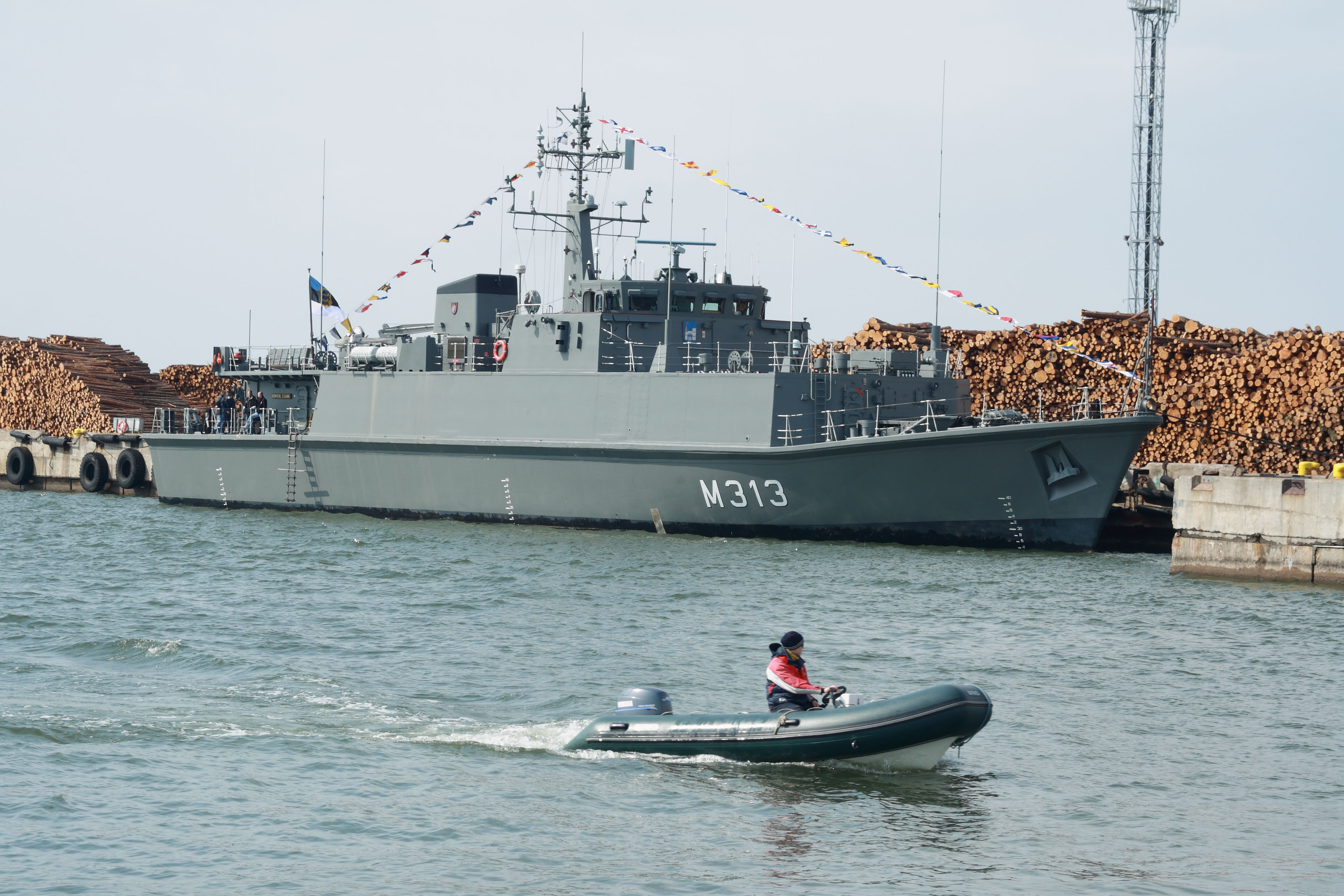
- EML Admiral Cowan M313

History

United Kingdom
- Name: HMS Sandown (M101)
- Operator: Royal Navy
- Builder: Vosper Thornycroft
- Launched: 16 April 1988
- Sponsored by: The Duchess of Gloucester
- Commissioned: 9 June 1989
- Decommissioned: 2005
- Fate: Sold to Estonia

Estonia
- Name: EML Admiral Cowan (M313)
- Namesake: Admiral Sir Walter Henry Cowan
- Operator: Estonian Navy
- Acquired: April 2007
- Motto: Ad Omnia Paratus
- Status: In refit (June 2026)
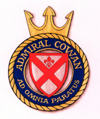
- Badge

General characteristics
- Class & type: Sandown class minehunter
- Displacement: 450 tons full
- Length: 52.6 m (173 ft)
- Beam: 10.5 m (34 ft)
- Draught: 2.4 m (7 ft 10 in)
- Propulsion: 2 x Paxman Valenta 6RPA200M diesels, 3 x Rolls-Royce (Perkins) CV8-250G drives; 2 x Combimac electric motors (100 kWh); 2 x Voith-Schneider propulsors; 2 x Schottel bow thrusters
- Speed: 13 knots (24 km/h; 15 mph) diesel; 6.5 knots (12.0 km/h; 7.5 mph) electric
- Complement: 7 officers, 29 sailors
- Crew: 36
- Sensors & processing systems: Plessey Nautis M C2 system, later replaced by Thales M-CUBE; Type 1007 navigation radar; Thales 2093 hull mounted mine hunting sonar, later replaced by Thales 2193
- Armament: 1 x ZU-23-2 23 mm autocannon; 2 × Browning 12.7 mm machine guns; 3 x Rheinmetall MG 3 7.62 mm machine guns; (Note: Armament as HMS Sandown: *1 × Oerlikon 30 mm KCB gun on DS-30B mount *2 × 7.62 mm L7 GPMG machine guns *Wallop Defence Systems Barricade Mk. III countermeasure launchers *Irvin Aerospace Replica Decoy launchers)
- Notes: Mine counter measures equipment: Atlas Elektronik Seafox MIDS; Klein Marine Systems System 5000 side scan sonar; Remus 100 AUV

EML Admiral Cowan (M313) is a Sandown-class minehunter. Formerly HMS Sandown, lead ship of her class of the Royal Navy, she is now an Estonian Navy ship. Renamed EML Admiral Cowan, she is the flagship of the Estonian Navy and part of the Estonian Navy's mine sweeping flotilla. Admiral Cowan is the lead vessel of the Estonian Navy Mineships Division and also the first of the three modernised Sandown class minehunters received.

== History ==
HMS Sandown was built by Vosper Thornycroft and was laid down at their Woolston, Southampton shipyard on 2 February 1987 and was launched on 18 April 1988 by the Duchess of Gloucester, as the lead ship of the 12-ship class of Sandown class minehunters. Sandown entered service a year later on 9 June 1989.

After commissioning, Sandown carried out an extensive programme of trials, and was not fully operational until December 1992, having suffered problems with her sonar outfit. She participated in a number of operations in support of the British fleet, including operating as part of a NATO-led operation between 12 June - 26 August 1999, along with the Hunt class Mine countermeasure vessel HMS Atherstone and the survey ship HMS Bulldog. The operation was intended to clear the Adriatic of bombs jettisoned during the Kosovo campaign. Together Sandown and Atherstone accounted for about 20% of the 93 bombs and missiles that were located and destroyed.

On 16 January 2000 Sandown located the wreck of the sunken scallop dredger, the Solway Harvester. Sandown spent July 2002 on a Joint Maritime Course, after which she deployed to the Mediterranean to take part in the Argonaut 02 exercises, which lasted until Christmas. Sandown was also deployed as part of Operation Telic, to clear mines in the Persian Gulf, and sweep passages into Iraqi ports.

The Royal Navy decommissioned HMS Sandown and two of her sisters Bridport and Inverness in 2005 and, on 9 October 2006, sold the vessels to the Estonian Navy. After refitting in Rosyth, Sandown was formally handed over to the Estonian Navy in April 2007. Her new name comes from Admiral Sir Walter Henry Cowan who led the British naval forces in the Baltic in their intervention in the Russian Civil War, providing naval support to Estonia during the Estonian War of Independence.

Between July and December 2018, the ship went through a modernization programme at Babcock's Rosyth facilities. It was fitted with the Thales Sonar 2193 navigation system and Thales M-CUBE command and control system. Its composite hull and electrical systems received repairs and upgrades. Her sister ships Ugandi and Sakala will also be modernized for a total cost of around 30 million euros.

On 16 February 2026, while departing Estonia to take part in a NATO exercise, Admiral Cowan sustained damage to her fibreglass hull after encountering significant ice conditions. In May 2026, ERR reported that the vessel was awaiting repairs, along with her sister ship EML Sakala which had suffered fire damage earlier in the year. As a result, the two vessels were laid up at Miinisadam Naval Base awaiting repairs. Subsequently, all Sandown-class vessels in the Estonian Navy were relegated to warm-water use.

We have three minehunters, all built of fiberglass, and their ability to operate in ice is very limited. As a rule, we don't take that kind of risk.

— Commodore Ivo Värk

== Crest ==
The vessel's crest was presented by Queen Elizabeth II on 20 October 2006 in Tallinn. The crest is a red saltire cross on a silver shield and above, a red fleur de lys (lily). The shield is placed into a blue ring which is surrounded by a golden ship's rope. The ship's crest is based on Walter Cowan's family arms. The ship's motto in Latin is: Ad Omnia Paratus - which in English means: "Prepared for Anything". The crest was designed by Priit Herodes.

== See also ==
- BALTRON project
- Mineships Division
