= EML Olev =

Former minelayer of the Estonian Navy

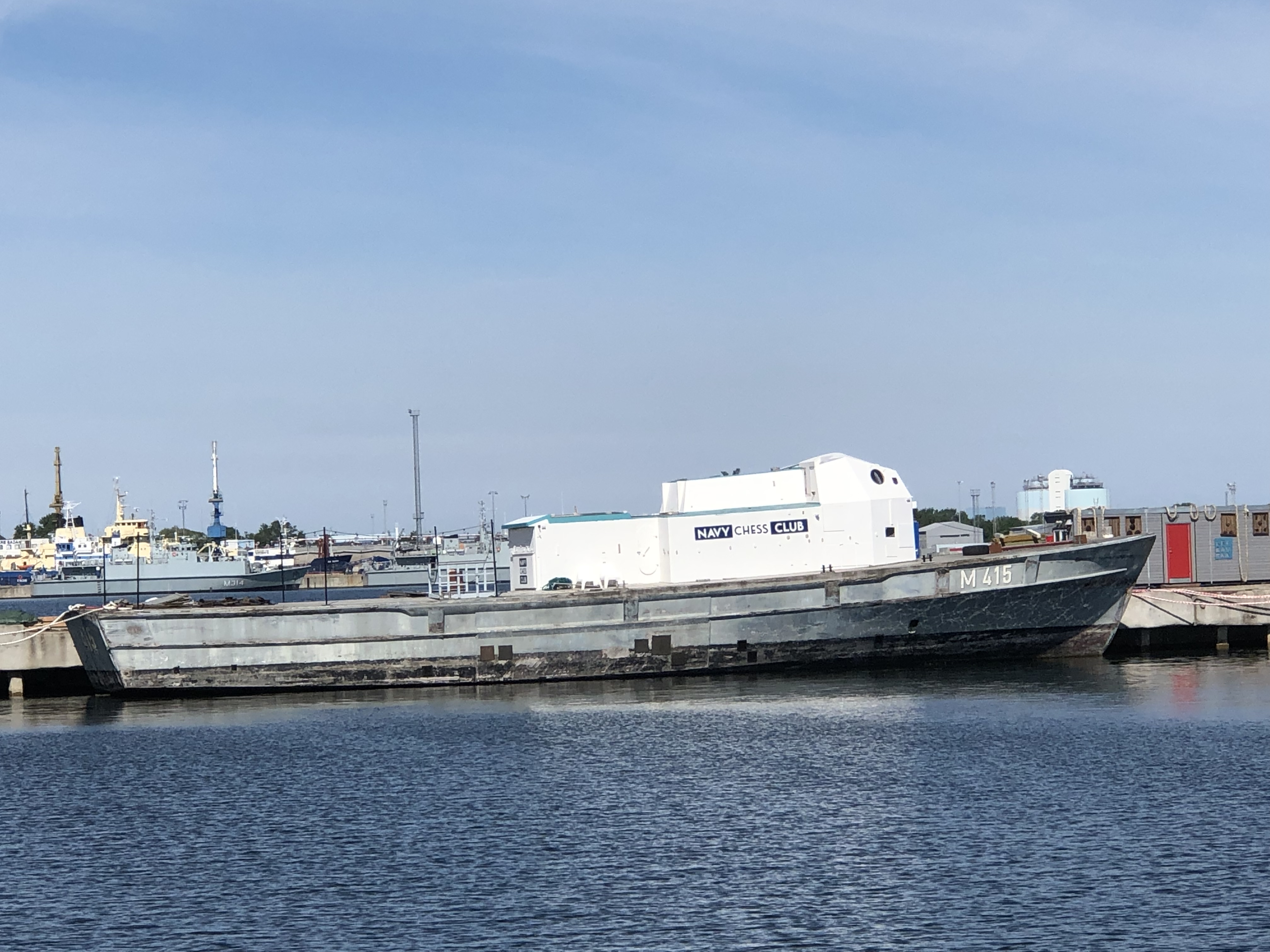
- EML Olev M415 In Noblessner Harbor, July 2022

History

Germany
- Name: Diana
- Operator: German Navy
- Builder: Krögerwerft Rendsburg Germany
- Launched: 13 December 1966
- Commissioned: 21 September 1967
- Decommissioned: 16 February 1995
- Fate: Donated to Estonia

Estonia
- Name: Olev
- Operator: Estonian Navy
- Acquired: 5 September 1997
- Decommissioned: 2005
- Fate: Moored in Noblessner Sea port. For sale as of 2025.

General characteristics
- Class & type: Frauenlob-class
- Displacement: 246 tons full
- Length: 37.9.1 m
- Beam: 8.2 m
- Draught: 2.4 m
- Propulsion: 2 shafts propulsors; diesel drives; 2 MTU MB 12V 493 TY70 diesel drives
- Speed: 12 knots
- Range: 1,120 km (600 nmi; 700 mi)
- Complement: 6 officers, 19 sailors
- Crew: 25
- Sensors & processing systems: Navigation radar; Atlas Elektronik, I-band
- Armament: 1 × 40 mm /70 Bofors automatic cannon; 2 × 12.7 mm Browning machine gun
- Notes: Mine counter measures equipment: 2 × ECA PAP 104 Mk.5 remotely controlled submarines (ROV) with explosives; Contact-sweeper; Mine-laying capability

EML Olev (M415) was a Frauenlob-class minelayer of the Estonian Navy Mineships Division.

== Introduction ==
The minelayer Olev was a vessel of the Estonian Navy Mineships Division and also the third modernized Frauenlob class minelayer. In 2003, a cooperation contract was signed between the Paldiski city council and the minelayer Olev which gave the vessel a right to wear the Paldiski town coat of arms and to introduce the city in all foreign harbors across the world.

== History ==
The Olev (M415) was built in West-Germany, in a Krögerwerft shipyard in Rendsburg. Originally named Diana, the vessel was launched on 13 December 1966, and she entered service a year later on 21 September 1967. The German Navy decommissioned Diana and two of her twin sisters Minerva and Undine in late 1990s and gave the vessels to the Estonian Navy to operate. On the ceremony the vessel received an Estonian name Olev. Olev was decommissioned in 2005 and sold in 2008. She then sat "abandoned" in Tallinn Seaplane Harbor till she was towed to Noblessner, where its superstructure got a new coat of paint. She is currently sitting in Noblessner Harbor.

As of 2025, the ship was for sale (announcement of the ship being on sale published in the Finnish webpage Nettivene.com).

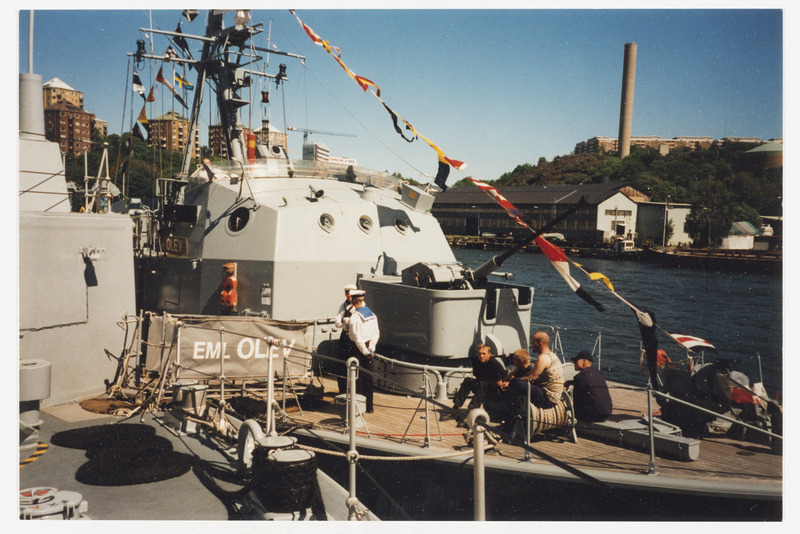
EML Olev (1999)

== See also ==
- Baltic Naval Squadron
