= EML Sulev (M312) =

1957 Estonian ship

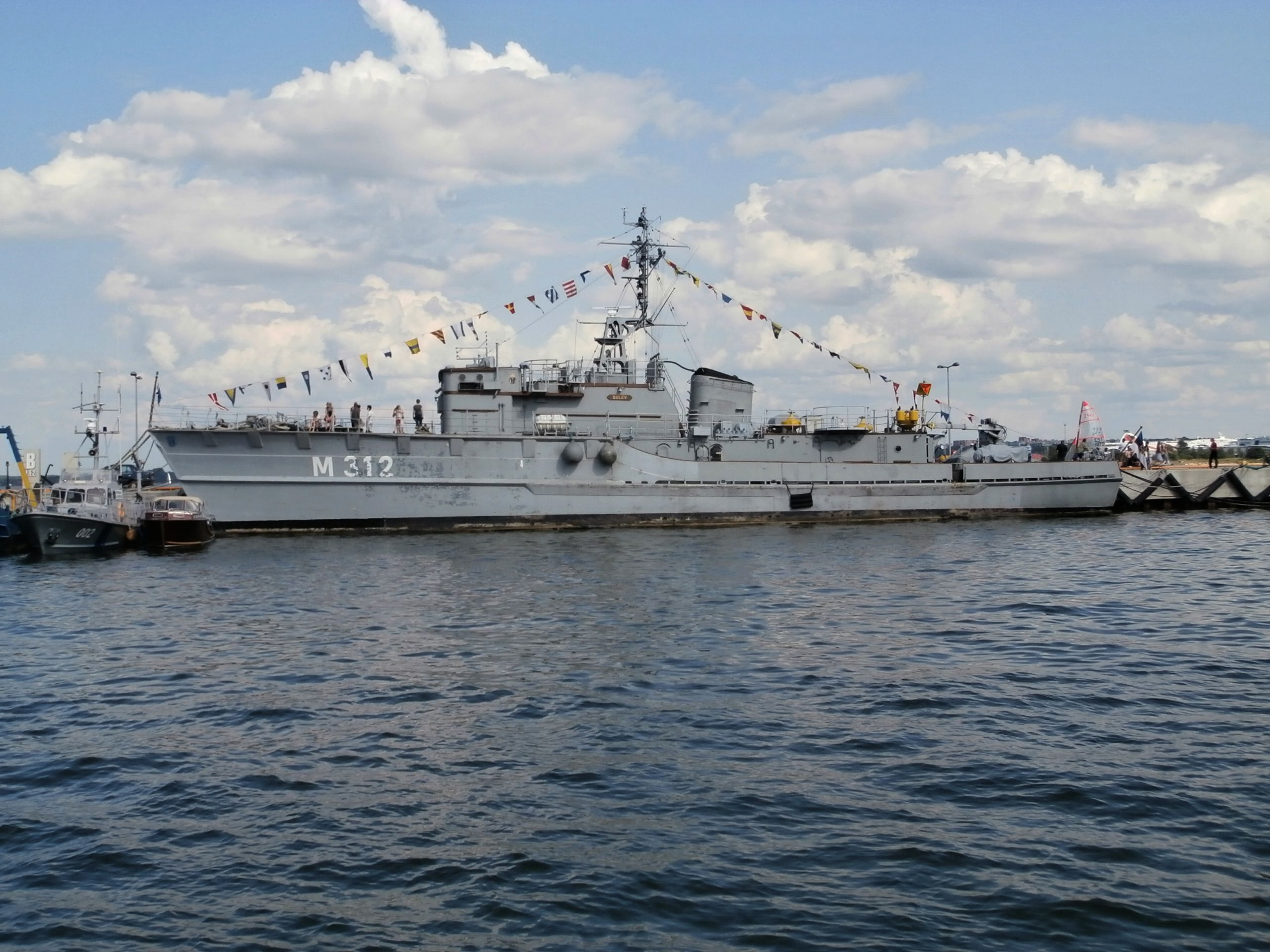
- EML Sulev (M312)

History

Germany
- Name: Lindau
- Builder: Burmeister-Werft Bremen-Burg, Germany
- Launched: 16 February 1957
- Commissioned: 24 April 1958
- Decommissioned: 19 October 2000
- Fate: Sold to Estonia

Estonia
- Name: Sulev
- Acquired: December 2000
- Decommissioned: 26 March 2009
- Motto: Certum Est
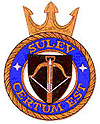
- Badge

General characteristics
- Class & type: Lindau-class minehunter
- Displacement: 495 tons full
- Length: 47.1 m (154 ft 6 in)
- Beam: 8.3 m (27 ft 3 in)
- Draught: 3.7 m (12 ft 2 in)
- Propulsion: 2 shafts propulsors; Diesel drives; 2 × 1,470 kW (1,970 hp) Maybach MD 871 um/1-D drives; 5 × 70 kW (94 hp) diesel drives RHS 518 Dn 5
- Speed: 16.5 knots (30.6 km/h; 19.0 mph)
- Range: 1,360 km (730 nmi; 850 mi)
- Complement: 6 officers, 31 sailors
- Crew: 37
- Sensors & processing systems: Navigation radar; Hull-mounted DSQS-11 mine-detection sonar
- Armament: 1 × 40 mm/70 Bofors automatic cannon; 2 × 12.7 mm Browning MG gun
- Notes: Mine counter measures equipment: 2 × ECA PAP 104 Mk.5 remotely controlled submarines (ROV) with explosives; Contact-sweeper

EML Sulev (M312) was a Lindau-class minehunter of the Estonian Navy Mineships Division.

== Introduction ==
The minehunter Sulev was part of the Estonian Navy Mineships Division and also the second modernized Lindau-class minehunter. A cross-bow is on the coat of arms of the vessel which was also a friend of Kalevipoeg Sulev's son weapon. The ships motto is in Latin "Certum Est" which means in English "Secure it is". The coat of arms was designed by Priit Herodes. In August 2001 on the 5th Kuressaare naval day a cooperation contract was signed between the Kuressaare city council and the minehunter Sulev which gave the vessel a right to wear the Kuressaare town coat of arms and to introduce the city in all foreign harbors across the world.

== History ==
Sulev was built in the Burmester shipyard in Bremen, West Germany. The vessel was launched on 16 February 1957 and she entered service a year later on 24 April 1958 as Lindau. She was to become the first German naval ship built since the end of the Second World War in Germany. The ship's name comes from a city called Lindau in Germany and also marks the minehunter class name which has in total of 18 vessels. Originally Lindau was a minesweeper but was transformed into a minehunter in late 1970s. The German Navy decommissioned Lindau and one of her sister ships, Cuxhaven, on 9 October 2000 and gave the vessels to the Estonian Navy to operate. On the ceremony the vessel received an Estonian name Sulev. The Estonian Navy decommissioned Sulev on 26 March 2009. For some time, Sulev was a museum ship on display at the Lennusadam museum in Tallinn. Sulev was given for scrapping in 2021 or 2022.
