= Impierator =

Russian Empire war ship

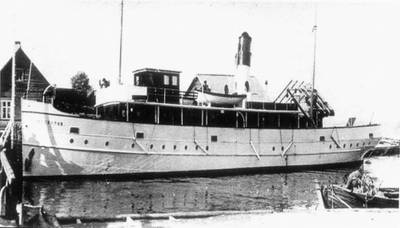

Russian Empire
- Name: Impierator Alexander III
- Builder: A. Alhström, Varkaus, Grand Duchy of Finland
- Launched: 1914
- Commissioned: 1914

Imperial Russian Navy
- Name: Impierator, Priezidient
- Commissioned: September 9, 1915

Estonian Navy
- Name: Vanemuine
- Decommissioned: January 14, 1919

Soviet Navy
- Name: Issa
- Commissioned: August 13, 1940
- Decommissioned: August 11, 1941

Nazi Germany
- Name: Vanemuine
- Commissioned: 1941
- Decommissioned: August 1944
- Fate: scrapped

General characteristics
- Class & type: passenger ship/gunboat
- Displacement: standard: 200 t (200 long tons); full: 263 t (259 long tons)
- Length: 37.8–38 m (124 ft 0 in – 124 ft 8 in); at the waterline: 35.6–36.1 m (116 ft 10 in – 118 ft 5 in)
- Beam: 6.2–6.3 m (20 ft 4 in – 20 ft 8 in)
- Draft: 1.9 m (6 ft 3 in)
- Propulsion: 2 two-cylinder steam engines (300 or 406 hp), or 1 engine (209 hp); 2 propellers
- Speed: 9–10 kn (17–19 km/h; 10–12 mph)
- Range: 220–300 nautical miles at a speed of 9 kn (17 km/h; 10 mph)
- Crew: 4 officers, 26 sailors
- Armament: 2 × 75 mm guns; 2 × Maxim machine guns

Impierator (Russian: Император) was a passenger ship that also served as a warship in the navies of the Russian Empire, both sides of the Russian Civil War (as Priezidient), the Republic of Estonia (as Vanemuine), the Soviet Union (as Issa), and Nazi Germany (under the Estonian name). It participated in both World Wars and the Estonian War of Independence, operating on Lake Peipus. The vessel was sunk multiple times and scrapped after 1953.

== Construction and technical details ==
The steamship was constructed in 1914 by the A. Ahlström shipyard in Varkaus, Finland, as a passenger vessel. To launch the ship, its hull was transported by rail to Jurjew.

The ship measured 37.8–38 meters in overall length (35.6–36.1 meters at the waterline), with a beam of 6.2–6.3 meters and a draft of 1.9 meters (1.64 meters unloaded). Its displacement was reported as 264 tons (full) and 200 tons (standard) by Ehlers, 175 tons by Vercamer, and 291 tons by Smirnow and Łapszyn. The hull and deck were made of riveted steel, with a wooden superstructure.

Propulsion consisted of two compound steam engines with two cylinders, powered by a single wood-fired boiler holding 50 m³ of fuel. The engine room produced 300 horsepower (or 406). This enabled a maximum speed of 10 knots (or 9). At 9 knots, the cruising range was 220 nautical miles. Smirnow and Łapszyn alternatively describe a single coal-fired steam engine producing 208 horsepower, with a range of 300 nautical miles. The ship was equipped with two propellers.

Its initial armament included two 75 mm guns and two 7.62 mm M1910 Maxim machine guns.

== Service history ==
Initially named Impierator Alexander III (after Emperor Alexander III of Russia), the ship operated as a passenger vessel on Lake Chudskoye for the Lifland Shipping Company. In August 1915, it was requisitioned by the Imperial Russian Navy and began armament under the shortened name Impierator.

After arming in Pskov, the ship was commissioned into the Chudskoye Flotilla on 9 September 1915, formally established six days later. Its civilian crew underwent military training and received uniforms. The crew consisted of 27 personnel, including a boatswain's mate, two helmsmen, gunners, a signalman, a medic, a chief cook, a sapper, six stokers, and twelve other sailors, commanded by Lieutenant W. Moczulski. In 1916, the ship was placed in reserve, and in 1917, it underwent repairs. Following the February Revolution, the name Impierator was deemed inappropriate and changed to Priezidient on 16 June 1917. After the October Revolution, it was seized by the Bolsheviks on 26 October.

On 28 October 1918, Officer D. Nielidow evacuated Priezidient, Narodnik, and Delfin from their base, handing them to the White forces. On 20 December, the Bolsheviks recaptured the ships during an offensive on the Emajõgi river. Without relocation, the ships were seized by Estonian forces during their counteroffensive on 14 January 1919. That month, it joined the newly formed Lake Peipus Gunboat Division as the flagship, named Wanemuine (later Vanemuine after Estonian language reform), referencing the god of dance, music, and celebration from the Estonian epic Kalevipoeg. In May 1919, it was relocated to the Emajõgi river's mouth, supporting the Northern Corps with artillery fire near Skamja-Gdov and Podborowje-Ostrowcy. On 26 May, it was based in Pskov, transporting personnel and goods between Pskov, Tartu, and Gdov, evacuating the 2nd Estonian Infantry Division command, Danish Red Cross members, diplomats, and refugees. In September, it engaged Bolshevik outposts in Pniewo, Puczkowo, and Sosinica. On 17 October, during a feigned Estonian assault on Pskov, the ship, positioned at the Velikaya river's mouth, was hit by shore-based artillery, killing one crew member and wounding four. Repaired in Tartu, it saw no further action in the independence war.

After the war, it was disarmed and, from 23 February 1920 to 1931, operated under the Ministry of Trade and Industry for passenger and cargo transport, occasionally leased to the Kutteveo company. In 1931, it was rearmed with three 47 mm guns – the maximum caliber allowed for lake vessels under the Treaty of Tartu – and returned to the gunboat division. It was placed in reserve in 1933.

Following the Soviet occupation of Estonia, the ship was seized on 13 August 1940 and used as a training vessel in the Chudskoye Flotilla. From 22 March 1941, it was named Issa. On 30 June 1941, due to the German invasion of the Soviet Union, it was reclassified as a gunboat, armed with two 76 mm Lender guns from the cruiser Aurora and two machine guns. Based at the Rannapungerja river's mouth, it shelled German forces near Mustvee on 20 July alongside gunboats Narova and Embach. On 22 July, it was attacked by Luftwaffe aircraft, likely Messerschmitt Bf 110s from II/ZG 26, suffering heavy casualties. On 11 August, the crew scuttled Issa at the Rannapungerja's mouth.

The Germans raised the ship in September 1941, restored the name Vanemuine, and incorporated it into their Lake Peipus Flotilla under the Reich Service flag, primarily for troop transport. In August 1944, it was sunk by Soviet aircraft. Raised post-war, it was scrapped after 1953 due to extensive damage.

== Bibliography ==
- Vercamer, Arvo Lennart (2014). "Pole bitwy: jezioro Pejpus od 5000 lat przed naszą erą do 1945 roku" [Battlefield: Lake Peipus from 5000 BCE to 1945]. Okręty Wojenne (in Polish). 1–2 (123–124). Tarnowskie Góry: Wydawnictwo Okręty Wojenne. ISSN 1231-014X.
