= Ivo Värk =

Estonian army officer (born 1974)

- Värk in 2022

Commander of the Estonian Navy
- Incumbent
- Assumed office 28 June 2024
- President: Alar Karis; Ülle Madise
- Preceded by: Jüri Saska

Personal details
- Born: 26 June 1974 (age 52) Estonian SSR, Soviet Union
- Education: Naval Academy Mürwik; Estonian Military Academy; Salve Regina University (MA); U.S. Naval War College

Military service
- Allegiance: Estonia
- Branch/service: Estonian Navy
- Years of service: 1992–present
- Rank: Commodore
- Commands: Estonian Navy; Navy Headquarters; EML Wambola

Ivo Värk (born June 26, 1974) is an Estonian navy officer and the current Commander of the Estonian Navy, since June 2024.

== Biography ==
=== Career ===
Värk was born on June 26, 1974, in the Estonian SSR.

Värk was conscripted into the Estonian Navy in 1992. He passed officer's training at the Mürwik Naval Academy in 1998, then attended Eguermin, the Belgian-Dutch Naval Mine Warfare School. Following active service as a junior officer on various ships, he became the executive officer, then commanding officer, of EML Wambola.

In 2003, Värk was replaced as commander of the Wambola, and given a reassignment to the navy headquarters.

In 2008, Värk became Chief of Staff of the naval headquarters, and was promoted to the rank of commander.

He served in the training department of NATO's Allied Maritime Command from 2012 to 2015, whereafter he became a senior representative of Estonia to the Baltic Defence College, and a lecturer for maritime operations.

On July 5, 2019, he became Deputy Commander of the Estonian Navy, and commander of the fleet. At the time, he was holding the rank of captain lieutenant.

Later, he attended the U.S. Naval War College, and was promoted to full captain upon return.

In June 2024, Värk became the Commander of the Estonian Navy, with the rank of commodore.

=== Modernization and Russian shadow fleet response ===
Under Värk's initiative, the navy has begun modernization, with three specific focus areas: maritime situational awareness (MSA), mine warfare, and coastal missile defense. Värk advocates for the integration of surveillance networks, including sea and air assets, to protect Estonia against growing regional threats and escalations in the Baltic Sea.

Värk's suggestions are in accordance with the Ministry of Defence's '10 year plan,' which is a series of developments projected to be implemented by 2035. Additionally, he announced a commitment to acquire two additional ships for the naval fleet.

In March and April 2026, 30 oil tankers of the Russian shadow fleet were seen at anchor near the Estonian island of Vaindloo, in the Gulf of Finland. In response, Värk has commented that the Estonian Navy will not intercept the vessels, so as to not escalate a conflict. A year prior, in 2025, the navy had failed to board a Russian oil ship.

Värk also acknowledged that around half of the ships present were sanctioned by the European Union, due to the Russo-Ukrainian War. Estonia, an EU member, further reaffirmed their sanctions against Russian oil in July 2026.

== Education ==
Värk has attended various schools throughout his military service. In addition to the German and American naval academies, he has also received a bachelor's degree from the Estonian National Defence College, and a master's degree in international relations from Salve Regina University.

== Dates of promotion ==
Promotions
Insignia	Rank	Date
	Lieutenant	20 June 2001
	Senior lieutenant	18 June 2004
	Captain	17 June 2020
	Commodore	18 June 2024
