= Värk =

Surname list

Värk is an Estonian surname. Notable people with the surname include:

- Ivo Värk (born 1974), Estonian naval officer
- Luisa Värk (born 1987), Estonian singer and politician
