= Teplokhod-class minelayer =

Class of inshore minelayers

Class overview
- Name: Pukkio class
- Builders: Valtion venetelakka, Helsinki, Finland
- Operators: Imperial Russian Navy, Finnish Navy, Estonian Navy, Soviet Navy
- Built: 1914-1916
- In commission: 1914-1952 (?)
- Completed: 10
- Lost: 2
- Retired: 8

General characteristics
- Type: Minelayer
- Displacement: 60-80 tons
- Length: 20.3-28.0 m
- Beam: 4.5-5.7 m
- Draught: 1.2-1.5 m
- Propulsion: 80 hp (60 kW)
- Speed: 9 knots (17 km/h)
- Complement: 6
- Armament: Teplokhod-class: 1 x 47 mm; 80 mines; In Finnish use: 1 x 20 mm or 1 x machine gun; 30-45 mines

The Teplokhod class motor minelayer was constructed as inshore motor minelayers intended for laying ground controlled shallow water minefields. Their small size and ability to maneuver in shallow waters made them suited for this task however those same features made it dangerous to operate these ships in open sea.

== History ==
=== Finnish Navy ===
Finnish Navy operated five ships of this class, Pommi, Miina, Loimu, Lieska and Paukku. They had been left into Finland when Russians withdrew in 1918. It took until 1920 to get them refitted for service. During the Winter War they laid between 1 December and 6 December 1939 total of 352 mines to 12 different minefields. The ships continued to serve in Continuation War in both minelaying as well as in transport roles.

Name	Previous Name	Commissioned	Fate
Loimu	T-21	1920-1960s (?)	Stricken from the lists. In civilian use at least until 1990.
Lieska	T-16	1920-1950s	Stricken from the lists.
Paukku	T-15	1920-1941	Foundered in November 1941
Pommi	M-7	1920-1950s	Stricken from the lists.
Miina	T-17	1920-1952	Stricken from the lists.

While transporting troops and supplied to Beryozovye Islands Finnish ship of the class Paukku foundered during a storm on 13/14 November 1941.

=== Estonian Navy ===
Estonian Navy operated several ships of this class, some of which were taken over by Soviet forces in 1940.

=== Soviet Navy ===
Soviet forces commissioned at least two ships of the class in 1940 for various tasks. One of the ships of this class was scuttled 27 August 1941.
