= Jüri Saska =

Estonian army officer (born 1974)

- Saska in 2023

Commander of the Estonian Navy
- In office 1 February 2017 – 28 June 2024
- President: Kersti Kaljulaid; Alar Karis
- Preceded by: Sten Sepper
- Succeeded by: Ivo Värk

Personal details
- Born: 20 August 1974 (age 52) Adavere, then part of Estonian SSR, Soviet Union
- Children: 2

Military service
- Allegiance: Estonia
- Branch/service: Estonian Navy
- Rank: Commodore

Jüri Saska (born 20 August 1974 in Adavere) is a retired Estonian naval officer. He served as Commander of the Estonian Navy from 1 February 2017 until 28 June 2024.

== Awards and decorations ==
=== Decorations and badges ===

Distinguished Service Decoration of the Estonian Defence Forces
| 3rd class of the White Cross of the Estonian Defence League | Order of Merit of the Estonian Defence Forces | Memorial Medal "10 Years of the Re-Established Defence Forces" |

== Dates of promotion ==
Promotions
| Insignia | Rank | Date |
|---|---|---|
| | Lieutenant | 20 June 2001 |
| | Senior lieutenant | 18 June 2004 |
| | Commander | 20 June 2012 |
| | Captain | 15 February 2017 |
| | Commodore | 18 February 2020 |
