= EML Sakala =

1990 United Kingdom ship; also used by Estonian Navy

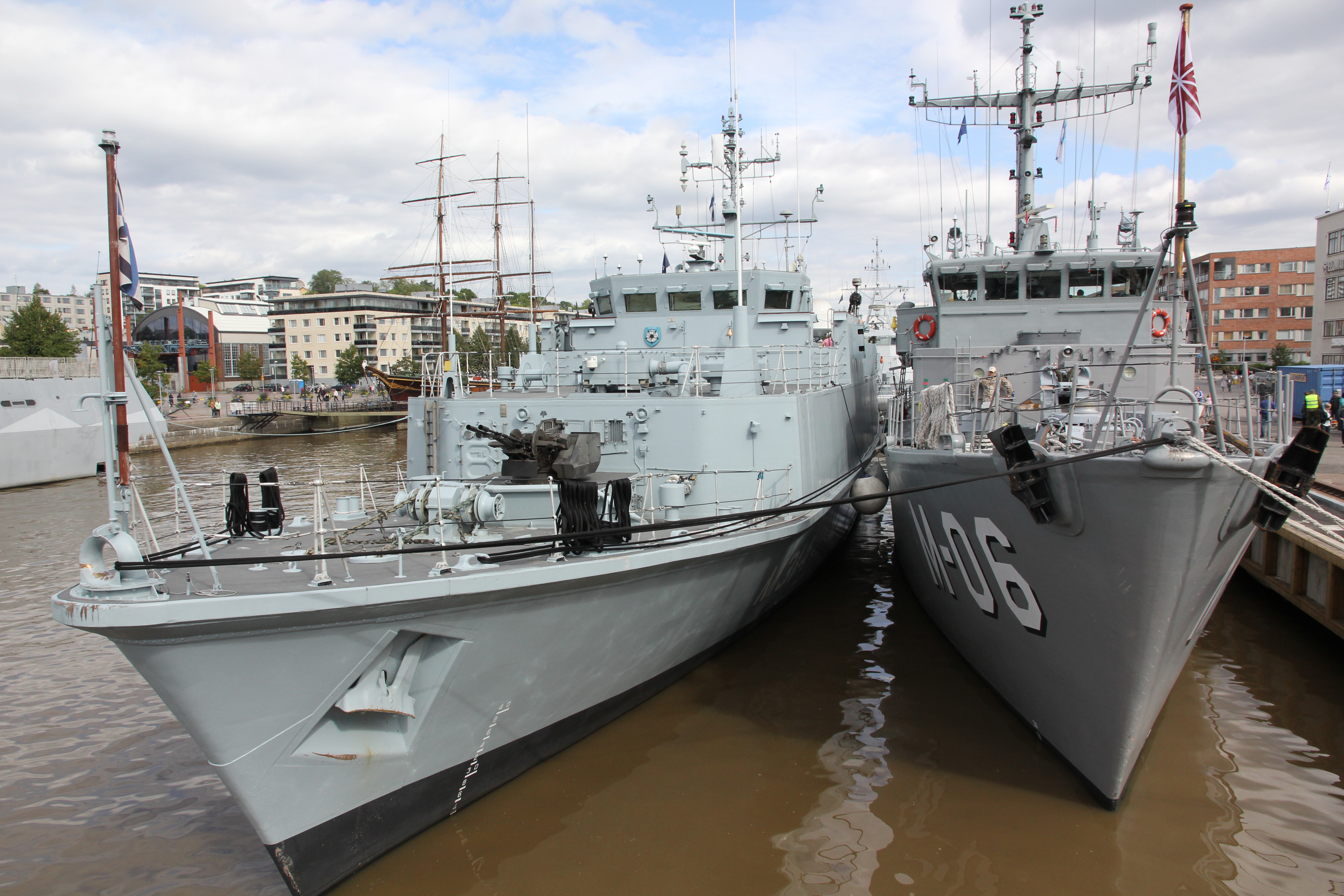
- EML Sakala M314 (left) in Turku

History

United Kingdom
- Name: HMS Inverness
- Namesake: Inverness
- Operator: Royal Navy
- Builder: Vosper Thornycroft
- Launched: 27 February 1990
- Commissioned: 24 May 1991
- Decommissioned: 2005
- Out of service: Paid off 15 November 2004
- Identification: Pennant number: M102
- Fate: Sold to Estonia

Estonia
- Name: EML Sakala
- Namesake: Sakala
- Operator: Estonian Navy
- In service: 24 January 2008
- Identification: Pennant number: M314; Call sign: ESQJ; MMSI number: 276742000
- Status: In refit
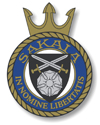
- Badge

General characteristics
- Class & type: Sandown-class minehunter
- Displacement: 484 tons full
- Length: 52.5 m (172 ft)
- Beam: 10.9 m (36 ft)
- Draught: 2.3 m (7 ft 7 in)
- Propulsion: 2 shafts Voith-Schneider propulsors; diesel-electric drive; Paxman Valenta diesels, 1,500 shp
- Speed: 13 knots (24 km/h; 15 mph) diesel; 6.5 knots (12.0 km/h; 7.5 mph) electric
- Complement: 34 (7 officers, 27 ratings)
- Sensors & processing systems: Type 1007 navigation radar; Thales 2193 hull mounted mine hunting sonar
- Armament: 1 × Twin ZU-23 23 mm AA cannon; 2 × 7.62 mm L7 GPMG machine guns; Wallop Defence Systems Barricade Mk. III countermeasure launchers; Irvin Aerospace Replica Decoy launchers
- Notes: Mine counter measures equipment: SeaFox Mine Disposal System; Clearance divers

EML Sakala (M314) is a Sandown-class minehunter of the Estonian Navy. She was decommissioned by the Royal Navy in 2005, and sold to Estonia.

== HMS Inverness ==
HMS Inverness was built by Vosper Thornycroft and launched on 27 February 1990 as one of the 12 ship class of Sandown-class minehunters.

Inverness took part in the major joint service Exercise Saif Sareea II in Oman throughout October 2001, and also trained on her way back from the Gulf as part of the overarching Exercise Argonaut 2001 maritime task group. During Exercise Saif Sareea II, Inverness formed part of a minehunter group with her sisters Walney, and the Hunt-class mine countermeasure vessels Quorn and Cattistock, supported by RFA Diligence.

In 2003, Inverness was one of a number of Royal Navy warships taking part in a multi-national exercises off Scotland, which involved ships and aircraft from a number of the world's navies, including French, German and American units. HMS Inverness was awarded the Freedom of the City of Inverness in 2004.

In July 2004, the UK Ministry of Defence announced that as part of the restructuring of the Navy, the three oldest Sandown-class minehunters would be retired by April 2005. Inverness was decommissioned in 2005 and was then laid up awaiting a buyer or disposal. In September 2006, Estonia signed a contract to acquire the three vessels.

After refitting in Rosyth Inverness was formally handed over to the Estonian Navy in April 2007, and renamed EML Sakala.

== EML Sakala (M314) ==
Sakala belongs to the Estonian Mineships Division. She is the fourth vessel of the Estonian Navy Mineships Division and second of three modernized Sandown class minehunters purchased from the Royal Navy.

The coat of arms was presented on a ceremony on 24 January 2008 in Scotland. The ship's name comes from an ancient Estonian county Sakala which is today known as Viljandimaa but is often called Sakalamaa. The arms are a black shield which represents the rich soils of Sakala and ethnic Estonian men's clothing. The rose points towards the capital of Sakalamaa. The swords represent Sakala's important role in the Estonian ancient freedom fight and fighting spirit, as silver stands for loyalty. The ship's motto in Latin is "In nomine libertatis” meaning "In the name of freedom". The coat of arms was designed by Priit Herodes.

In December 2018 Sakala arrived at the Babcock site at Rosyth Dockyard for a series of modifications and upgrades, which included the Thales Sonar 2193 navigation system and the Thales M-CUBE command and control system.

In early 2026, a fire occurred aboard Sakala. While the fire was contained, the vessel suffered water damage to its electrical systems as a result of firefighting efforts. As of May 2026, repairs were underway at Miinisadam Naval Base, expected to be completed in July-August of the same year.

== See also ==
- BALTRON project
- Mineships Division
