= EML Wambola (A433) =

1977 Estonian ship

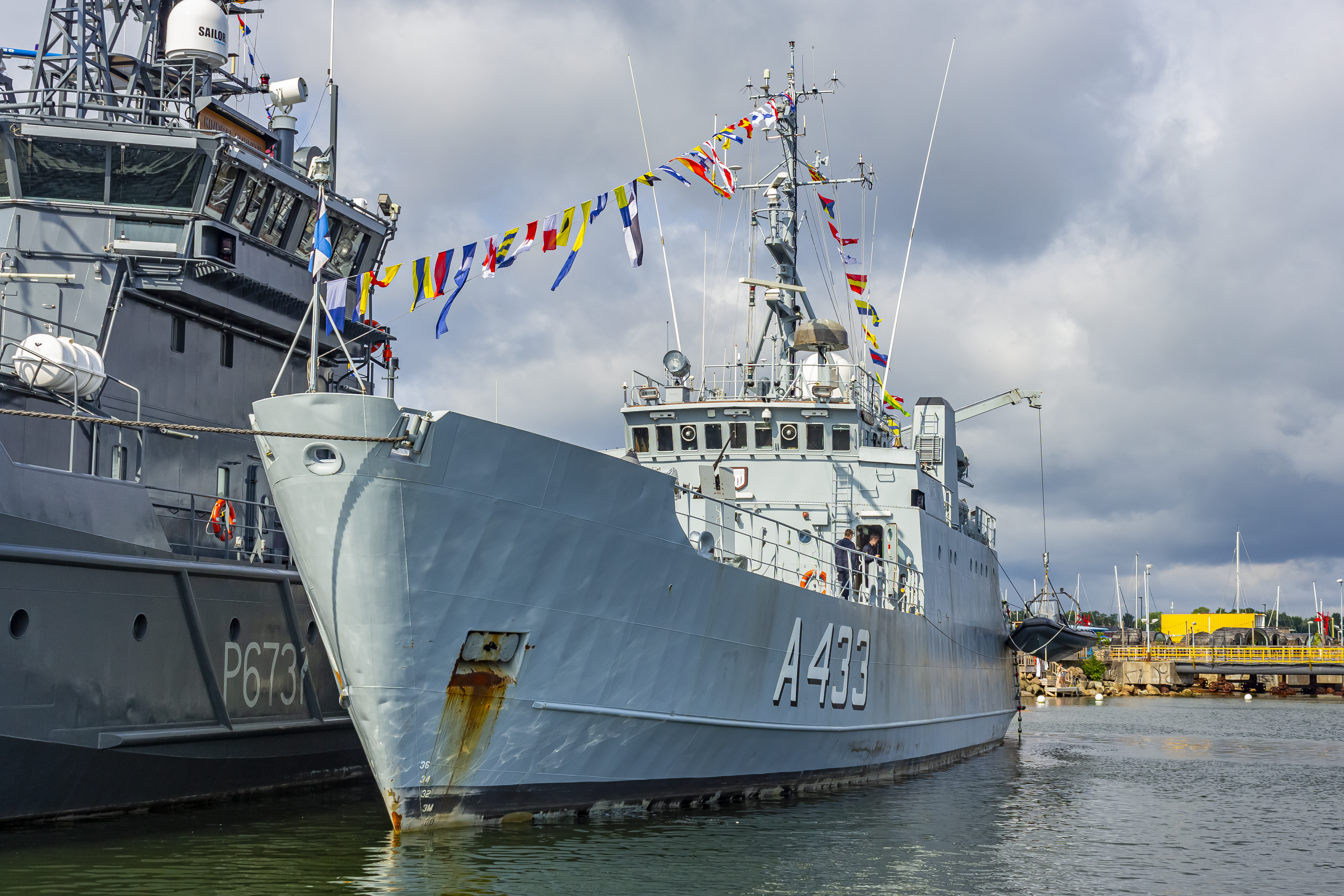
- EML Wambola at Lennusadam. 29 June 2024.

History

Denmark
- Name: KDM Lossen
- Operator: Danish Navy
- Ordered: 1973
- Builder: Svendborg Skibsværft
- Laid down: 9 June 1977
- Launched: 9 September 1977
- Commissioned: 14 June 1978
- Decommissioned: 22 October 2004
- Home port: Sønderborg Harbour
- Identification: Pennant number: N44; Call sign: OVKI
- Notes: Sold to Estonia

Estonia
- Operator: Estonian Maritime Academy
- Acquired: 4 July 2006
- Renamed: MS Kristiina
- Home port: Seaplane Harbour, Tallinn
- Notes: Handed over to Estonian Navy

Estonia
- Operator: Estonian Navy
- Acquired: 10 September 2009
- Recommissioned: 1 November 2016
- Renamed: EML Wambola
- Refit: 2016
- Home port: Tallinn, Harju County
- Identification: Pennant number: N6741; MMSI number: 276425000; Call sign: ESQE
- Motto: Ad Unquem (transl. Forever)
- Status: Active
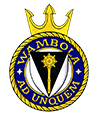
- Badge

General characteristics
- Class & type: Lindormen-class minelayer
- Displacement: 577 tons full
- Length: 44.5 m (146 ft 0 in)
- Beam: 9.0 m (29 ft 6 in)
- Height: 21 m (68 ft 11 in)
- Draught: 2.9 m (9 ft 6 in)
- Propulsion: 2 × MTU diesel engines (1600 kW); 2 adjustable propellers
- Speed: 14 knots (26 km/h; 16 mph)
- Boats & landing craft carried: 2
- Troops: 36
- Complement: 29 (including 5 officers)
- Sensors & processing systems: navigation radar; 2 × Litton Decca E, I-band
- Armament: 4 × Browning M2
- Notes: Also equipped with 2 cranes.

EML Wambola (A433) is a Lindormen-class minelayer built in 1977. As KDM Lossen, she served in the Danish Navy until 2006. Sold to the Estonian Maritime Academy as a maritime training vessel, she was renamed MS Kristiina. In 2009, she was handed over to the Estonian Navy as a command and support vessel and renamed Wambola.

== History ==
KDM Lossen (English: Lynx) was built in Denmark by Svendborg Ship Yard Ltd. as a minelayer. Her crest was prepared by the Navy's Heraldic Working Group at the request of the Chief of the Danish Navy and approved by Queen Margrethe II on 1 December 1976. The vessel was laid down on 9 June 1977 and launched on 9 September 1977. She entered service a year later on 14 June 1978 and became part of the Danish 2. Minelayer Division. In 1982, Lossen was made available to STANAVFORCHAN for command and support duties. Lossen served as a command ship when she participated in the exercise Blue Harrier between 12 and 22 April 1988.

The Danish Navy decommissioned KDM Lossen on 22 October 2004 and sold the vessel to the Estonian Maritime Academy on 4 July 2006. Renamed MS Kristiina, it was intended that she be used as a maritime training vessel. However, due to shortfalls in funding, the Maritime Academy handed the vessel over to the Estonian Navy on 10 September 2009. The ship was renamed EML Wambola on 14 May 2010 and left in reserve.

Wambola was modernized in the first half of 2016 and commissioned to replace EML Tasuja (A432) on 1 November 2016, with (Lt. Junior Grade) Leitnant Ermo Jeedas becoming her commander. EML Wambola took up the role of flagship of Standing NATO Mine Countermeasures Group 1 between 8 February 2017 and 29 June 2017. On 31 August 2017, (Lt.) Vanemleitnant Tanel Kangro became the ship's commander. On 16 August 2019, (Lt. Comdr.) Kaptenmajor Deniss Tulin replaced Tanel Kangro as the captain of the ship.
