= Yuryev (1897) =

Russian steamship

History

Imperial Russian Navy
- Name: Yuryev
- Commissioned: September 9, 1915
- Decommissioned: May 20, 1919

History

Imperial German Navy
- Name: Graf Kirchbach
- Commissioned: 1918
- Decommissioned: 1918

History

Soviet Navy
- Commissioned: December 20, 1918
- Decommissioned: January 14, 1919

History

Estonian Navy
- Name: Tartu
- Commissioned: 1920

History

Soviet Navy
- Name: Narova
- Commissioned: August 13, 1940
- Decommissioned: July 22, 1941

History

Nazi Germany
- Name: Heimat or Heimatland
- Commissioned: 1941
- Decommissioned: August 1944
- Fate: sunk and scrapped

General characteristics
- Class & type: steamship, gunboat
- Displacement: 145 t (143 long tons)
- Length: 39.2 m (128 ft 7 in)
- Beam: 5.3 m (17 ft 5 in)
- Draft: 1–1.2 m (3 ft 3 in – 3 ft 11 in)
- Propulsion: two-cylinder steam engine (120 hp)
- Speed: 9 kn (17 km/h; 10 mph)
- Range: 280 nautical miles at a speed of 9 kn (17 km/h; 10 mph)
- Crew: 3 officers, 25 sailors
- Armament: 1919 configuration: 1 × 47 mm gun, 2 × machine guns; 1941 configuration: 3 × 45 mm guns, 2 × machine guns

Yuryev (Russian: Юрьев) was a steamship and warship that served in the navies of the Russian Empire, German Empire (as Graf Kirchbach), Estonian Republic (as Tartu), the Soviet Union (as Narova), and Nazi Germany (as Heimat). It participated in both World Wars and the Estonian War of Independence, operating on Lake Peipus. The vessel was scrapped after World War II.

== Construction and technical description ==
The side-wheel steamship was constructed by the Lange & Söhne shipyard in Riga, commissioned by the Ministry of Public Transport of the Russian Empire. Construction was completed in 1897.

The ship measured 39.2 meters in overall length (37.9 meters at the waterline), with a beam of 5.3 meters and a draft of 1–1.2 meters. Its displacement was 145 tons.

Propulsion was provided by a two-cylinder compound steam engine, powered by a single wood-fired boiler with a 40 m^{3} fuel capacity. The ship featured paddle wheel propulsion. The engine produced 120 horsepower, enabling a maximum speed of 9 knots. At full speed, it had a range of 280 nautical miles.

The peacetime crew consisted of 2 officers and 19 sailors, increasing to 3 officers and 25 sailors during wartime.

== Service history ==
Initially named Yuryev (after the historical name of Tartu), the vessel operated on Lake Peipus under the Ministry of Public Transport. In August 1915, it was requisitioned by the Imperial Russian Navy.

On 9 September 1915, Yuryev was commissioned as an armed steamship into the Chudskoye Flotilla, formally established six days later. Its civilian crew underwent military training and was uniformed. The ship was armed with two machine guns initially, with a 47 mm gun added later that winter. Prolonged inactivity led to low crew morale and lax discipline. Following the October Revolution, Yuryev was seized by the Bolsheviks on 26 October 1917. It engaged in operations against the Whites on Lake Peipus.

The ship's fate immediately after the Bolshevik takeover is unclear, as it changed hands multiple times. Russian historian S. Patianin states it was captured by German forces on 25 February 1918 while wintering in Pskov. Vercamer also notes its capture by German land forces in 1918, after which it served as the flagship of the German Schifffahrtsgruppe flotilla on Lake Peipus under the name Graf Kirchbach, honoring Günther von Kirchbach, former commander of the 8th Army in the Baltic region. On 11 November 1918, following the armistice, the Germans transferred the ship to the Estonians, with Ferdinand Wichman as commander. However, Vercamer elsewhere suggests the Germans sold it to a private owner. Ehlers claims it was captured by the Whites in Pskov on 28 October 1917. Michajłow reports its seizure by the Whites after 28 October 1918 on the Velikaya river. Bierieżnoj similarly notes its capture by the Whites on the Velikaya river on 28 October 1918 after Pskov's fall. German historian Erich Gröner does not mention German service before 1941.

The Red Army captured the ship in Tartu on 20 December 1918 but abandoned it during an evacuation on 14 January 1919 due to winter conditions.

On 2 March 1919, the ship was incorporated into the Estonian Navy's Lake Peipus Gunboat Division as Tartu. It underwent a major overhaul and was rearmed. Sources differ on the armament: one reports three guns (two 47 mm and one 40 mm) and two machine guns; another mentions single 57 mm and 47 mm guns, later replaced by a single 40 mm gun. The ship underwent another major refit in 1931.

Following the Soviet occupation of Estonia, Tartu was taken over by the Soviet Navy on 13 August 1940. It served as a training vessel under its Estonian name until 22 March 1941, when it was renamed Narova (after the Narva river). On 30 June 1941, it was reclassified as a gunboat and assigned to the Chudskoye Flotilla, alongside other former Estonian vessels. Its armament was upgraded to three 45 mm guns and two machine guns. Some sources claim that by mid-July, Narova received a 76 mm 34-K anti-aircraft gun from the cruiser Aurora. On 23 July 1941, one month after the German invasion of the Soviet Union, the ship was damaged by the Luftwaffe and, unable to be evacuated, was scuttled by its crew near the mouth of the Kullavere river. Gröner cites 24 July.

In September 1941, the Germans salvaged the ship and renamed it Heimat (or possibly Heimatland). It was used as a housing hulk. It was sunk by Soviet aircraft in August 1944. Patianin suggests it was scuttled by its crew on 25 August 1944 on the Emajõgi river and destroyed by Soviet aircraft the following day.

The vessel was raised postwar but was scrapped due to extensive damage.

== Bibliography ==
- Vercamer, Arvo Lennart (2014). "Pole bitwy: jezioro Pejpus od 5000 lat przed naszą erą do 1945 roku" [Battlefield: Lake Peipus from 5000 BC to 1945]. Okręty Wojenne (in Polish). 1–2 (123–124). Tarnowskie Góry: Wydawnictwo Okręty Wojenne. ISSN 1231-014X.
