= Vark, Afghanistan =

Vark
- Location in Afghanistan
- Coordinates: 36°40′34″N 71°49′40″E
- Country: Afghanistan
- Province: Badakhshan Province
- Time zone: + 4.30

Vark is a village in Badakhshan Province in north-eastern Afghanistan.

== See also ==
- Badakhshan Province
