= Warraq (disambiguation) =

Warraq is the Arabic word for stationer or papermaker.

Warraq may also refer to:

- El Warraq, a municipal division and island on the Nile in Egypt

== People with the surname ==
- Abu Bakr al-Warraq, 9th-century gnostic and Sufi sheikh
- Abu Isa al-Warraq, 9th-century skeptical scholar
- Yusuf al-Warraq, 9th-century Andalusian geographer
- Ibn Sayyar al-Warraq, compiler of a tenth-century cookbook, al-Kitab al-Ṭabīḫ
- Ibn al-Nadim al-Warraq, 10th-century Muslim bibliographer
- Ibn Warraq, a critic of Islam
