= EML Ugandi =

1992 Estonian ship

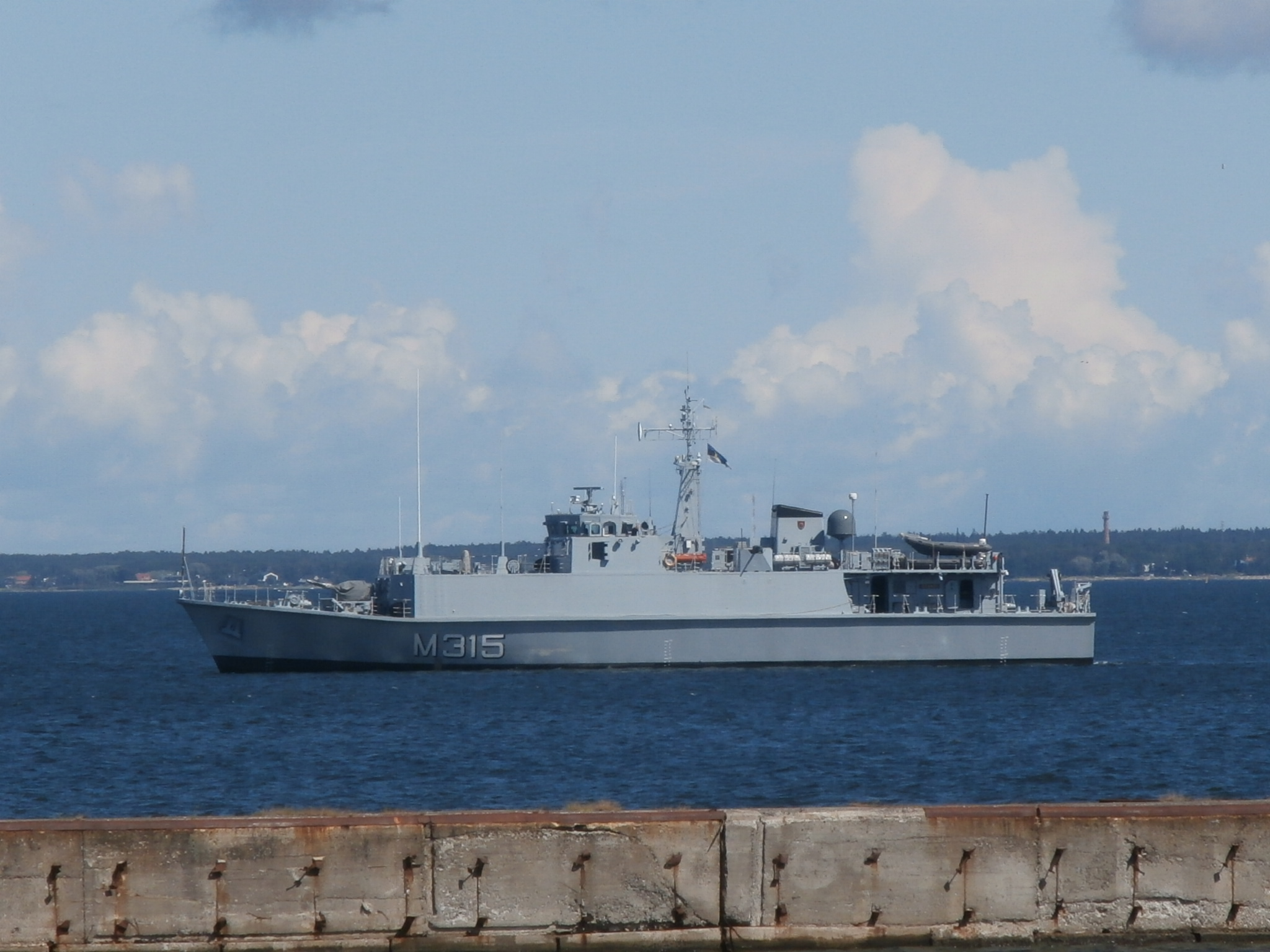
- EML Ugandi M315

History

United Kingdom
- Name: HMS Bridport
- Namesake: Bridport
- Builder: Vosper Thornycroft
- Launched: 20 July 1992
- Commissioned: 6 November 1993
- Decommissioned: 2004
- Identification: Pennant number M105
- Fate: Sold to Estonia

Estonia
- Name: EML Ugandi
- Namesake: Ugandi
- Acquired: 2006
- In service: 22 January 2009
- Home port: Tallinn
- Identification: Pennant number: M315; MMSI number: 276743000; Call sign: ESQK
- Motto: Semper Ante; (Always in Front)
- Status: Active
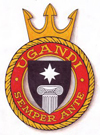
- Badge

General characteristics
- Class & type: Sandown-class minehunter
- Displacement: 450 tons full
- Length: 52.6 m (172.6 ft)
- Beam: 10.5 m (34.4 ft)
- Draught: 2.4 m (7.9 ft)
- Propulsion: 2 × Paxman Valenta 6RPA200M diesels; 3 × Sdmo V300 generators; 2 × Voith-Schneider propulsors
- Speed: 13 knots (24 km/h; 15 mph) diesel; 6.5 knots (12.0 km/h; 7.5 mph) electric
- Complement: 7 officers, 18 sailors
- Sensors & processing systems: Type 1007 navigation radar; Klein 5000 sidescan sonar; Thales Underwater Systems 2093
- Armament: 1 × Twin ZU-23 23 mm AA cannon; 3 × Browning 12.7 mm MG gun; anti-mine systems AE Seafox MIDS
- Notes: Built of glass reinforced plastic

EML Ugandi is a Sandown-class minehunter commissioned by the Estonian Navy in 2009. Ugandi is a former British Royal Navy vessel HMS Bridport built by Woolston Yard of Southampton-based shipbuilders Vosper Thornycroft.

The ship is the third and final Sandown-class vessel to join the naval force of Estonia after its mine countermeasures vessel modernization programme. She is named after an ancient Estonian county Ugandi, between the east coast of Lake Võrtsjärv and west coast of Lake Pskov, bordered by Vaiga, Mõhu, Nurmekund, Sakala, Latgale, and Pskov.

== History ==
Bridport was built by Woolston Yard of Southampton-based shipbuilders Vosper Thornycroft as one of the 12 ship class of Sandown-class minehunters.

In July 2004, the UK Ministry of Defence announced that as part of the restructuring of the Navy, the two oldest and one other Sandown-class minehunters would be retired by April 2005. Bridport was decommissioned and was then laid up awaiting a buyer or disposal. In September 2006, Estonia signed a contract to acquire the three vessels.

The former HMS Bridport was modernized and overhauled in Bay 1 of the Syncrolift at Rosyth. The project was started ahead of schedule to deconflict the programme. On 22 January 2009, the Estonian Navy flag was hoisted on the ship and she was named ENS Ugandi during a ceremony at Rosyth Dockyard. It reached Estonia on 24 February 2009, the Estonian Independence Day, under the command of Lieutenant Senior Grade Marek Mardo. Since 28 October 2012, the ship carries the coat of arms of Otepää.

Between 2012-2013, the ship had three of its Perkins CV8 generators replaced with SDMO V300 generators. On 30 August 2013, Lieutenant Senior Grade Marek Mardo became the commander of the ship, replacing Lieutenant Commander Villu Klesmann, who had been its commander since 2009. On 17 December 2018, Lieutenant Senior Grade Martin Aeltermann replaced Lieutenant Junior Grade Jaanus Pulk-Piatkowski as commander of the ship. The ship would go through a modernization programme the following year.

== Characteristics ==
The vessel carries clearance divers and Remote Control Mine Disposal Systems. Unlike the previous Lindau-class minehunter, the vessel was built from glass reinforced plastic to reduce her magnetic signature. Other parts of the ship were constructed from non-ferrous metals for a similar reason. They are propelled by Voith Schneider Propellers and are very maneuverable due to two bow thrusters which gives an advantage when working with mines. She differs from the previous two Sandown-class vessels delivered to the Estonian Navy, as she has been fitted with a ZU-23-2 twin mount, 23mm cannon system and a Klein 5000 sidescan sonar.

The ship's motto is in Latin: Semper Ante - which in English means: "Always In Front". The coat of arms was designed by Priit Herodes.
