= Miinisadam Naval Base =

Naval base in Tallinn, Estonia

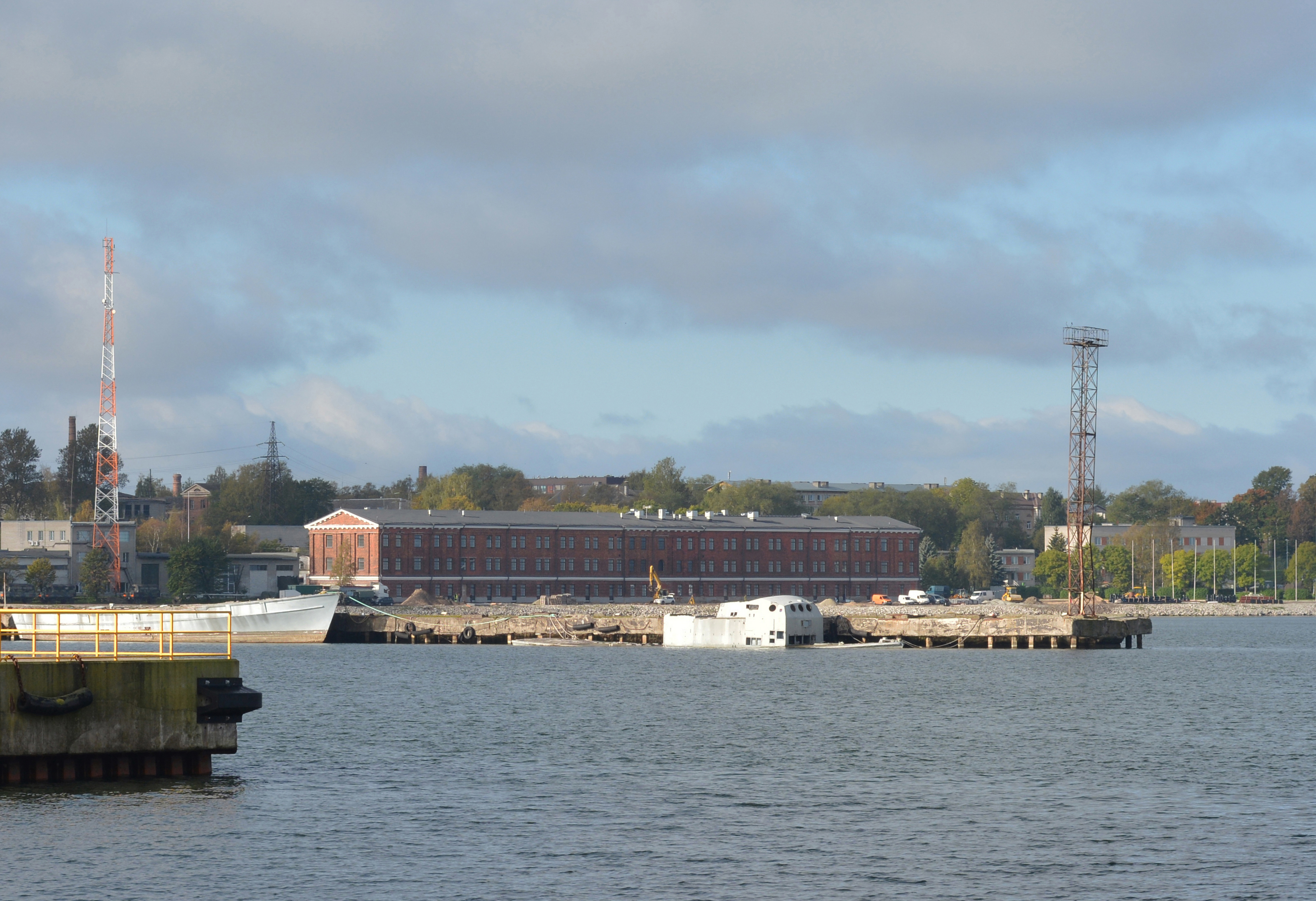
View of Miinisadam Naval Base

Miinisadam Naval Base (Mine Harbor Naval Base) is a naval base in Tallinn Bay in Tallinn, Estonia. The base has been used by the Estonian Navy since 1994. In addition to Estonian vessels, the base also accommodates NATO countries' vessels.
