= Estonian Mineships Division =

Estonian military unit

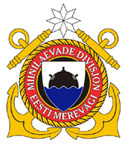
- Estonian Navy Mineships Division coat of arms.
- Active: 1997–2014
- Country: Estonia
- Branch: Estonian Navy
- Type: Division
- Size: 350 personnel
- Garrison/HQ: Tallinn
- Anniversaries: 15 May 1997

The Estonian Mineships Division was the main Estonian Naval Unit and the part of Estonian Navy. The top priority for the Navy is the development of a mine countermeasures capability, as that is also one of the Navy's peacetime responsibilities: during World War I and II more than 80,000 sea mines were laid in the Baltic Sea. Since 1995 a number of mine clearance operations have been carried out in Estonian waters in close co-operation with other navies of the Baltic Sea region in order to find and dispose of ordnance and contribute to safe seagoing. Estonian MCM vessels also participate in NATO naval exercises.

== Vessels ==
- EML Admiral Cowan (M313)
- EML Sakala (M314)
- EML Ugandi (M315)
- EML Wambola (A433)
