= Priit Herodes =

Estonian heraldist

Priit Herodes (born 14 January 1948) is an Estonian heraldist.

From 2000 to 2006, Herodes was the chairman of the Estonian Heritage Society and is currently a member of their board.

He has designed numerous hues and flags, including the emblems of many Estonian municipalities and state institutions. For example, he has designed the official post of the mayor of Tallinn, Tallinn Town Hall Square, the Estonian Academy of Security Sciences, the Symbolism of the Public Service Academy and the Narva Aleksandri Congregation. He has designed the flags and coat of arms of Anija, Türi, Õru, Tootsi, Lavassaare, Halinga, Avinurme and Jõelähtme.

He has received numerous awards for his "valuable contributions to shaping the symbols and awards of Tallinn", including the Buxhoeveden Cross and the 4th Class of the Order of the White Star.
