= Baltic Naval Squadron =

Military cooperation project between NATO and Baltic states

The Baltic Naval Squadron (BALTRON) was inaugurated in 1998. The main responsibility of BALTRON is to improve the co-operation between the Baltic states in the areas of naval defence and security. Constant readiness to contribute units to NATO-led operations is assured through BALTRON.

Each Baltic state appoints one or two ships to BALTRON for a certain period and staff members for one year. Service in BALTRON provides both the crew and staff officers with an opportunity to serve in an international environment and acquire valuable experience in mine countermeasures. Estonia provides BALTRON with on-shore facilities for the staff.

== Membership ==
There were three countries in the BALTRON:

- Estonia (until 2015)
- Latvia
- Lithuania
