= Estonian Navy =

Maritime warfare branch of Estonia's military

- Eesti merevägi
- Emblem of the Estonian Navy
- Active: 1918–1940; 1991–present
- Country: Estonia
- Type: Navy
- Role: Naval warfare
- Part of: Estonian Defence Forces
- Headquarters: Miinisadam
- Mottos: Mere kutsel - mere kaitsel! (English: "Call of the Sea – Call to Defend")
- Anniversaries: 21 November
- Engagements: Estonian War of Independence

Commanders
- Commander of the Estonian Navy: Commodore Ivo Värk
- Notable commanders: Admiral Johan Pitka

Insignia
- Ensign

- Jack

- Pennant

The Estonian Navy (Estonian: Eesti merevägi) are the unified naval forces among the Estonian Defence Forces.

With only seven commissioned ships and displacement well under 10,000 tonnes (3,633.5 tonnes as of February 2026), the Estonian Navy is one of the smallest navies in the world. Its ship prefix is EML (Estonian: Eesti Mereväe Laev, literally "Estonian Navy Ship"). The Estonian Navy has participated numerous times in NATO's naval joint-exercises.

== History ==
=== Interwar period ===
==== Foundation ====
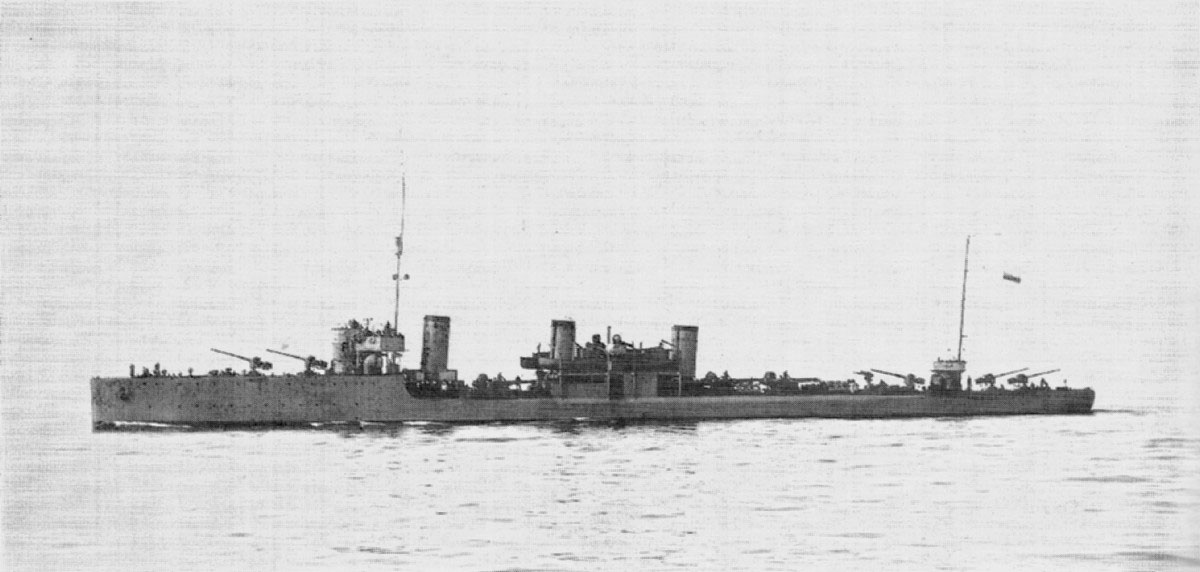
The Estonian destroyer Lennuk in 1924

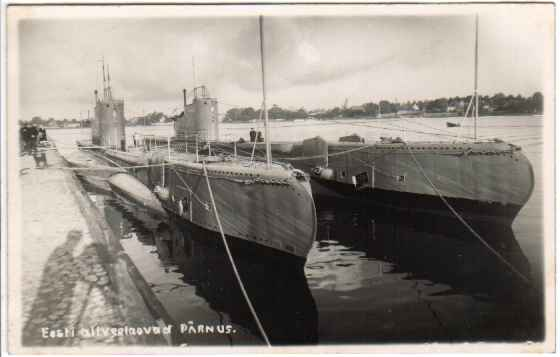
The Estonian submarines Kalev and Lembit during the interwar period

The Merevägi was founded on November 21, 1918. The foundation and development of the Estonian Navy relied greatly on the Royal Navy which operated in the Gulf of Finland as an ally to Estonia during the Estonian War of Independence. The first Estonian Navy warships were the destroyers Lennuk and Wambola and were gifts from the UK's Royal Navy after they had been captured from the Russian Baltic Fleet in 1919.

==== Marine Infantry ====
The Meredessantpataljon was a short-lived (formed and disbanded during 1919) marine infantry - Naval landing battalion of the Estonian Defence Forces subject to the Estonian Navy. The battalion was created from the crews of the Estonian surface warships and was based in Tallinn.

==== Coastal batteries ====
Since the end of the 19th century, the Russian Empire began to build coastal fortresses and naval strongholds in Estonia which was annexed to the empire after the Great Northern War in 1721. Tallinn, having been historically an important trading centre between the East and the West, became one of the main naval bases of the Imperial Russian Baltic Fleet. A systematic coastal defence network and naval gun installations were ordered, and the construction works began at the end of the 1890s.

During the Estonian War of Independence and after the Treaty of Tartu the Estonian Navy began to rebuild and develop the coastal defence network. From 1918 to 1940 Estonia invested millions of kroons into the renovation and development of coastal defences. By 1939 the coastal batteries presented a considerable naval force and were considered among the Estonian Navy elite forces. After World War II and later the Soviet occupation of Estonia, little has remained of the former coastal defence lines and fortifications. Today some buildings and firing positions can be seen at various places of which the best-preserved ones are located on the island of Aegna.

=== After restoration of independence ===
==== 20th century ====
In 1998 the Baltic Naval Squadron BALTRON was inaugurated. The main responsibility of BALTRON is to improve the co-operation between the Baltic States in the areas of naval defence and security. Constant readiness to contribute units to NATO-led operations is assured through BALTRON.

Each Baltic state appoints one or two ships to BALTRON for certain periods and staff members for one year. Service in BALTRON provides both, the crews and staff officers, with an opportunity to serve in an international context and acquire experience in mine countermeasures. Estonia provides BALTRON with on-shore facilities for the staff.

Since 1995 Estonian Navy ships have participated in most of the major international exercises and operations carried out in the Baltic Sea. Even though it was not until 1993 when the Navy was re-established, and despite the fact that it incorporates one of the smallest fleets in the world, the young crews of the Navy ships have demonstrated excellent interoperability during international exercises and have proved to be equal partners with other navies.

==== 21st century ====
From May 2005 to March 2006, EML Admiral Pitka was assigned as the Command and Support Ship of NATO's Standing NRF Mine Countermeasures Group 1 which is part of the NATO Response Force's maritime capability. ENS Admiral Pitka was the first vessel from the Baltic navies to be part of the force. SNMCMG1 is also one of the Estonian Navy's main NATO partners.

In 2020, the Estonian Defence Forces started planning the development of new defensive capabilities, which included procuring naval mines and anti-ship missile systems. In 2021, Estonia signed a contract with a Finnish company for the procurement of naval mines. In October, Estonia also signed a contract for Blue Spear 5G SSM anti-ship missiles.

In November 2021, the Estonian government decided to merge the fleet of the Police and Border Guard Board to the Estonian Navy. The navy would take over the ships, personnel and tasks of the Police and Border Guard Board. The merger would be completed by 1 January 2023.

As of 2025, the Estonian Navy plans to modernize its fleet with up to 12 new ships.

== Organisation ==
=== Commanders ===
No.	Portrait	Name (birth–death)	Term of office			Ref.
No.	Portrait	Name (birth–death)	Took office	Left office	Time in office	Ref.
1		Captain lieutenant Rudolf Schiller (1872–1938)	21 November 1918	21 December 1918	10 days	
2		Counter admiral Johan Pitka (1872–1944)	21 December 1918	28 November 1919	335 days	
3		Naval captain Johannes Herm (1893–1926)	28 November 1919	1 March 1925	5 years, 93 days	
4		Counter admiral Hermann Salza (1885–1946)	1 March 1925	1932	6–7 years	
5		Naval captain Valentin Grenz (1888–1944)	1 April 1934	4 October 1938	4 years, 186 days	
6		Captain major Valev Mere (1893–1949)	4 October 1938	18 September 1939	349 days	
Reestablishment
1		Naval captain Roland Leit	1994	1998	3–4 years	
2		Captain lieutenant Jaan Kapp	1998	2003	4–5 years	
3		Captain major Ahti Piirimägi	2003	2007	3–4 years	
4		Naval captain Igor Schvede (born 1970)	9 August 2007	23 July 2012	4 years, 349 days	
5		Naval captain Sten Sepper (born 1971)	23 July 2012	23 November 2016	4 years, 125 days	
6		Commodore; Jüri Saska (born 1974)	1 February 2017	28 June 2024	7 years, 148 days	
7		Commodore; Ivo Värk (born 1974)	28 June 2024	Incumbent	2 years, 121 days	

=== Operating forces ===
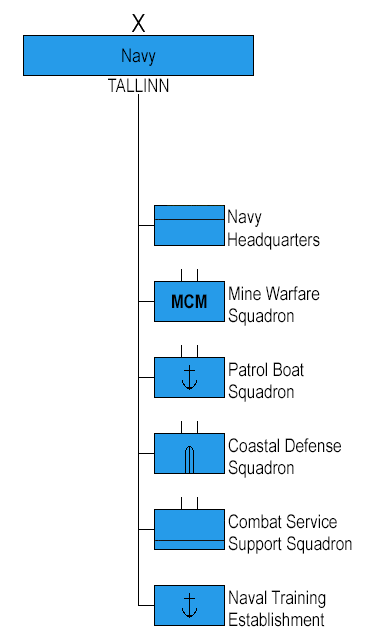
Estonian Navy organization as of April 2026

The top priority for the Estonian Navy is the development of mine countermeasures capability that is also one of the Navy's peacetime responsibilities: during World War I and World War II more than 80,000 sea mines were laid in the Baltic Sea. Since 1995 a number of mine clearance operations have been carried out in Estonian waters by the Estonian Mineships Division in close co-operation with other navies of the Baltic Sea region in order to find and dispose of ordnance and contribute to safe seagoing.

The Estonian Navy uses a small number of different vessels and weapon systems. Since the restoration of the Estonian Defence Forces on 3 September 1991 and the Estonian Navy on 1 July 1993, the naval force has developed tremendously. Then-Commander Estonian Naval Defence Forces, Commodore Roland Leit, was interviewed by Jane's Defence Weekly on 9 July 1994. 'When the Soviet Navy left the Tallinn Naval Base, they sabotaged the facilities and scuttled about 10 of their ships in the harbour. They broke all the windows, all the heating, and all the electrical equipment. When they came in 1939, they took over our port facilities in good order. Now they are leaving us a mess, he said bitterly.' 'We got nothing from the Russian Navy. The Griff class patrol craft we got not from them but from a Russian firm that had bought the hulls first. Their navigation and radio systems are broken, too. We hope to have it all repaired and bring the craft into service before the end of the year.'

Although the Soviet legacy's clean-up and military infrastructure rebuilding has taken most of the defence budget resources away from the Navy, the armament and equipment has improved a great deal.

==== Naval Flotilla ====
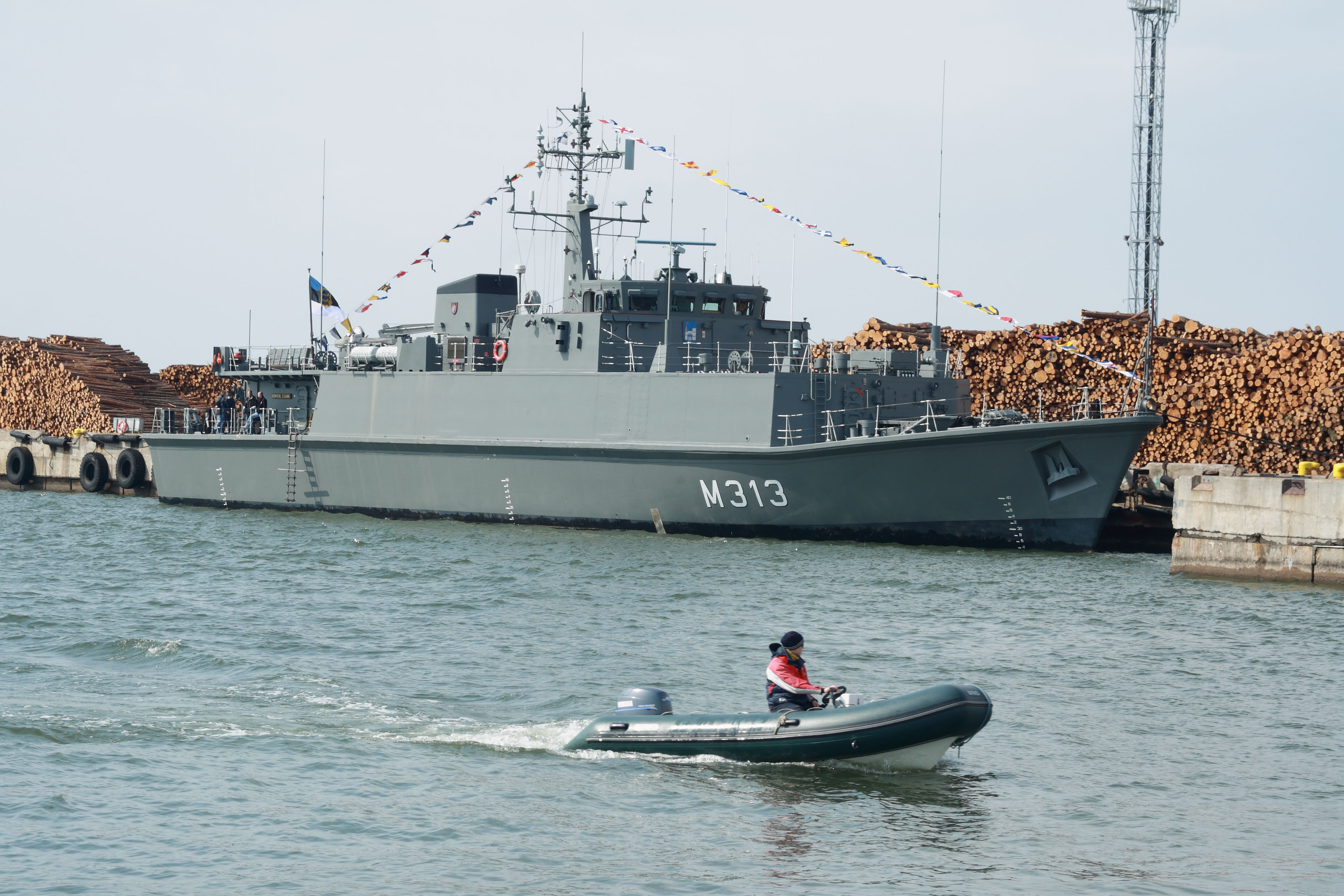
EML Admiral Cowan (M313)

Although the Estonian Defence Forces have a relatively small selection of marine vessels, the Navy still has a variety of different light-combat craft, coastal patrol-craft and support vessels. The first crafts that entered the service in the restored Estonian Navy in 1993 were mainly German background mine-layers and mine-hunters. Within the last 15 years, the Navy logistics support has increased year by year. Most of the modern navy vessels have either been received as foreign aid or been bought from Germany, Finland, United Kingdom and Denmark. In 2006, Estonia purchased three Sandown-class minehunter from the UK to enhance the Estonian Navy's mine-hunting capabilities.

In 2012, the Estonian Navy received a former Estonian Maritime Administration vessel EVA-321. It was renamed "Lood" (A530) and became a diving support vessel.

In September 2013, it was reported that the Estonian Navy was interested in acquiring the 1979-built Finnish minelayer Pohjanmaa that had been decommissioned by the Finnish Navy and was offered for sale. However, all of this speculation came to nought; in March 2016, a Finnish State-owned company (Meritaito) acquired the vessel.

In July 2018, it was reported that three Sandown-class minehunters were set to be modernized between 2018 and 2019. The modernization would include improvements in mine clearance and marine surveillance capabilities. The estimated cost of the project would be €30 million.

In April 2020, the Ministry of Defence announced that it would buy two force protection patrol boats. The boats would be manufactured by Baltic Workboats AS for a total sum of €3.9 million. They would enter service in 2021 and would be used for force protection at sea and in ports, and could also provide support for other agencies, including the Police and Border Guard Board. In December 2020, the Estonian Defence Forces received the two boats and named them Roland and Risto. In April 2024, Roland and Risto were donated to Ukraine.

==== Naval Base ====
The "Merevägi" has operated a number of naval bases and war harbours, most of them being located on the western coast and the islands. Until 1939 there were more than ten smaller and bigger war harbours and bases; including Aegna, Paldiski, Virtsu, Rohuküla, Mõntu, Kuressaare, Kõiguste, Papisaare, Jaagurahu, Tagalaht, Küdema, Sõru, Kärdla, Kallaste, Mustvee and Tallinn harbor. Currently, there is only one major naval harbour, Miinisadam, which is located in northern Tallinn. Miinisadam is a base for the Mineships Division.

== Personnel ==
Most Estonian Navy officers have been trained in a number of European or American naval academies (notably the US Naval Academy). In 2003, the Navy established its own Centre of Naval Education and Training (CNET) to train junior petty officers.

Each Baltic State shares its limited training resources with the others. For instance, Estonia provides communications training at the Baltic Naval Communications School in Tallinn, and Latvia hosts a common Baltic Naval Diving Training Centre in Liepāja.

=== Ranks ===
==== Commissioned officer ranks ====
The rank insignia of commissioned officers.

NATO code	OF-10	OF-9	OF-8	OF-7	OF-6	OF-5	OF-4	OF-3	OF-2	OF-1
Estonian Navy
Estonian Navy		Admiral	Viitseadmiral	Kontradmiral	Kommodoor	Mereväekapten	Kaptenleitnant	Kaptenmajor	Vanemleitnant	Leitnant	Nooremleitnant	Lipnik

==== Other ranks ====
The rank insignia of non-commissioned officers and enlisted personnel.

NATO code	OR-9		OR-8	OR-7	OR-6	OR-5	OR-4		OR-3	OR-2	OR-1
Estonian Navy
Estonian Navy	Ülemveebel	Staabiveebel	Vanemveebel	Veebel	Nooremveebel	Vanemmaat	Maat	Nooremmaat		Vanemmadrus	Madrus

== See also ==
- Finnish–Estonian defense cooperation
