= Kendon =

Kendon is a surname. Notable people with the surname include:

- Adam Kendon (1934–2022), British authority on the topic of gesture
- Frank Kendon (1893–1959), English writer, poet and academic
- Olive Kendon (1897–1977), English educator and social activist
- Viv Kendon, British physicist
- Kendon Underwood, American attorney and politician

== See also ==
- Kenion
- Kenton (disambiguation)
