= Kenton =

Kenton may refer to:

== Places ==
=== Canada ===
- Kenton, Manitoba

=== South Africa ===
- Kenton-on-Sea

=== United Kingdom ===
- Kenton, Devon
- Kenton, London
  - Kenton station, Kenton Road, Kenton, London
- Kenton, Newcastle upon Tyne, Tyne and Wear
- Kenton, Suffolk
  - Kenton railway station (Suffolk)

=== United States ===
- Kenton, Delaware
- Kenton Hundred
- Kenton County, Kentucky
  - Kenton, Kentucky
- Kenton, Michigan
- Kenton, Ohio
- Kenton, Oklahoma
- Kenton, Portland, Oregon
  - Kenton Hotel
- Kenton, Tennessee

== People ==
- Kenton (given name), people with the given name
- Kenton (surname), people with the surname

== Ships ==
- USS Kenton (APA-122), an attack transport of the United States Navy during World War II
- SS Kenton, the name of two ships

== Other uses ==
- Kenton (cigarette)
- Kenton Archer, a fictional character in The Archers

== See also ==
- Kenton High School (disambiguation)
- Ken-Ton, the pairing of Kenmore, New York and Tonawanda, New York
- Kenton in Hi-Fi, a 1956 album by Stan Kenton
- Kington (disambiguation)
- Kintoni, a town in the Democratic Republic of the Congo
- Kinton, Oregon, an unincorporated community
- Kinton, Shropshire, England, a hamlet
- Kyneton, a town in Victoria, Australia
