= EML Kalev =

Two ships of the Estonian Navy have been named Kalev:

- EML Kalev (1936), a Kalev-class submarine launched in 1936 and taken over by the Soviet Union in 1940; she was sunk in the following year
- EML Kalev (M414), a Frauenlob-class minesweeper previously Minerva in the German Navy she was acquired by Estonia in 1997 and renamed Kalev. Decommissioned in 2004 and became a museum ship
