= Seaplane Harbour =

Port and museum in Tallinn, Estonia

- Lennusadam
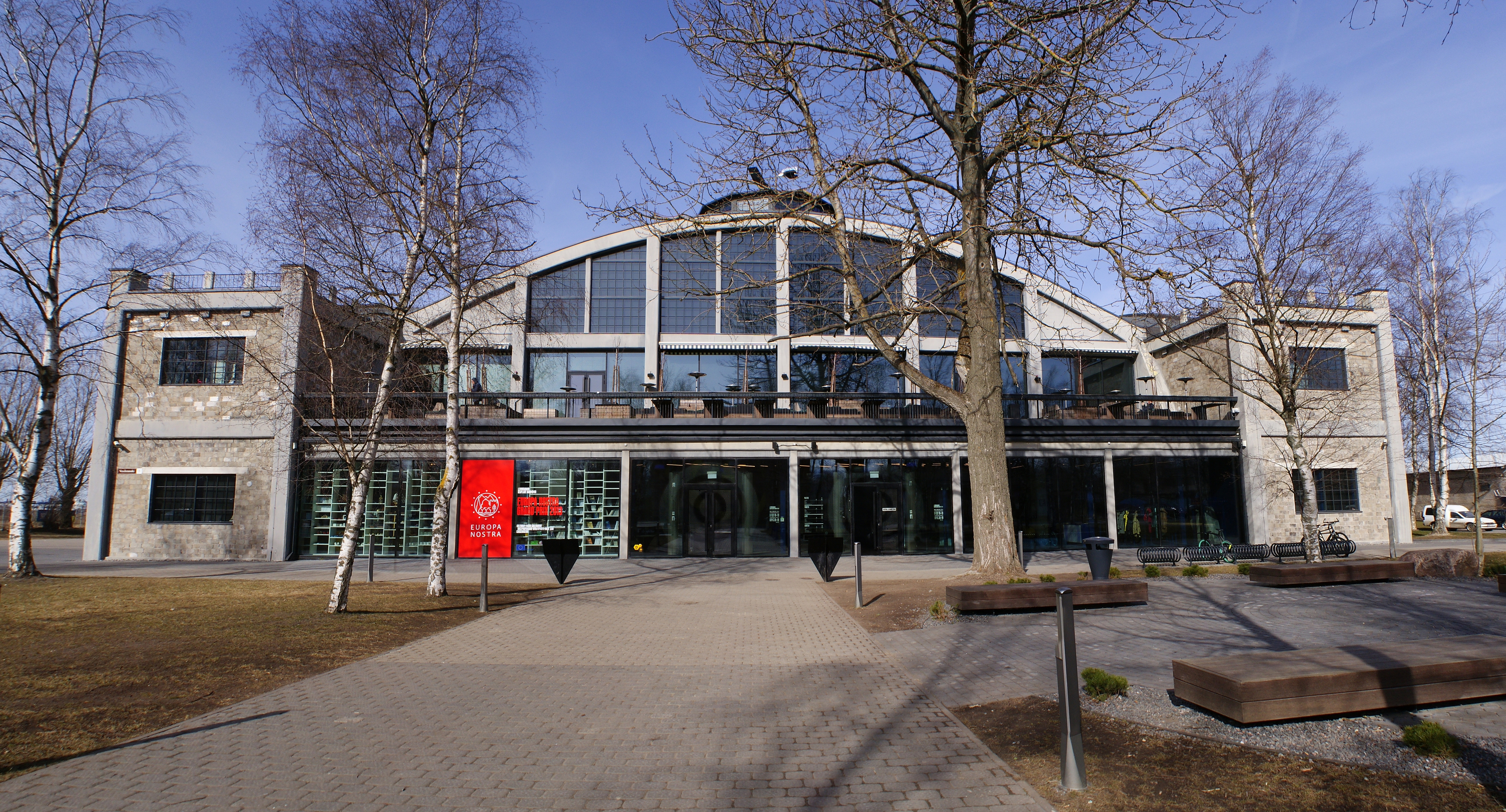
- Entrance to the museum
- Established: 12 May 2012
- Location: Vesilennuki 6, Tallinn, Estonia
- Coordinates: 59.450433°N 24.738308°E
- Type: Maritime museum
- Key holdings: EML Lembit
- Visitors: 321,700 (2014)
- Director: Urmas Dresen
- Parking: On site (no charge)
- Website: www.lennusadam.ee

The Seaplane Harbour (Estonian: Lennusadam) is a maritime museum in Tallinn, Estonia, which opened in spring 2012. The museum is part of the Estonian Maritime Museum.

The museum is located in the Tallinn aeroplane harbour, in a building originally constructed as a hangar for seaplanes in the area of Peter the Great's Naval Fortress. The hall has an area of 8,000 m^{2} (86,000 sq ft) and was put out of service during the Soviet era. Its renovation started in 2010; it was 70% funded by the European Regional Development Fund and 30% by the Estonian state.

== Exhibits ==
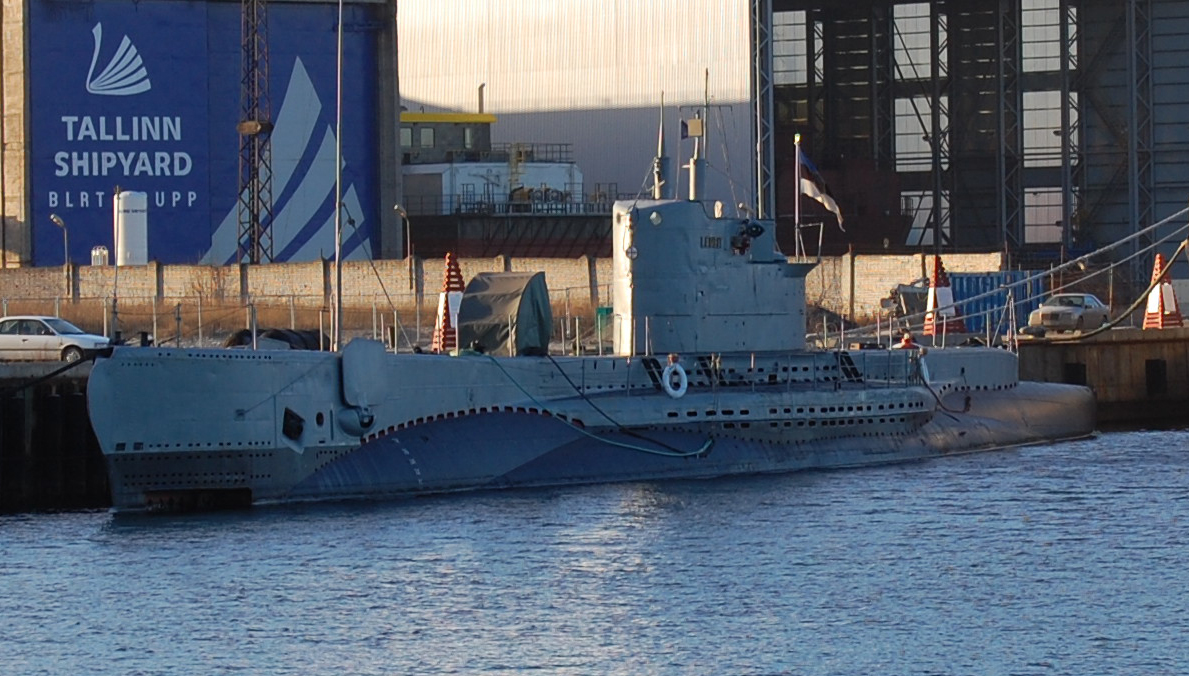
The submarine Lembit

The main attraction in the museum is the 1936 submarine Lembit, which was ordered by Estonia from the United Kingdom, and has now been renovated to its original 1930s appearance. The museum also has a yellow submarine, which can be used to familiarise oneself with piloting a submarine, and a full-scale replica of a World War I era Short Type 184 seaplane. None of the original seaplanes remain to this day. The wreck of the wooden ship Maasilinn dates to the 16th-century and had sailed between Saaremaa and mainland Estonia. The icebreaker Suur Tõll originally sailed for Finland under the name Wäinämöinen. It was captured from the Russians near Helsinki in 1918 and donated to Estonia from Finland in 1922 according to the Treaty of Tartu.

The museum had a special exhibit illustrating the background to the sinking of the MS Estonia ferry in 1994.

The attractions in the museum are located on three levels: in the air, on the sea and below the sea. The museum presents the history of Estonia as a maritime country in a modern visual language. The museum has submarine and flight simulators, a pool where people can sail miniature ships and large aquariums to look at aquatic animals.

== Gallery ==
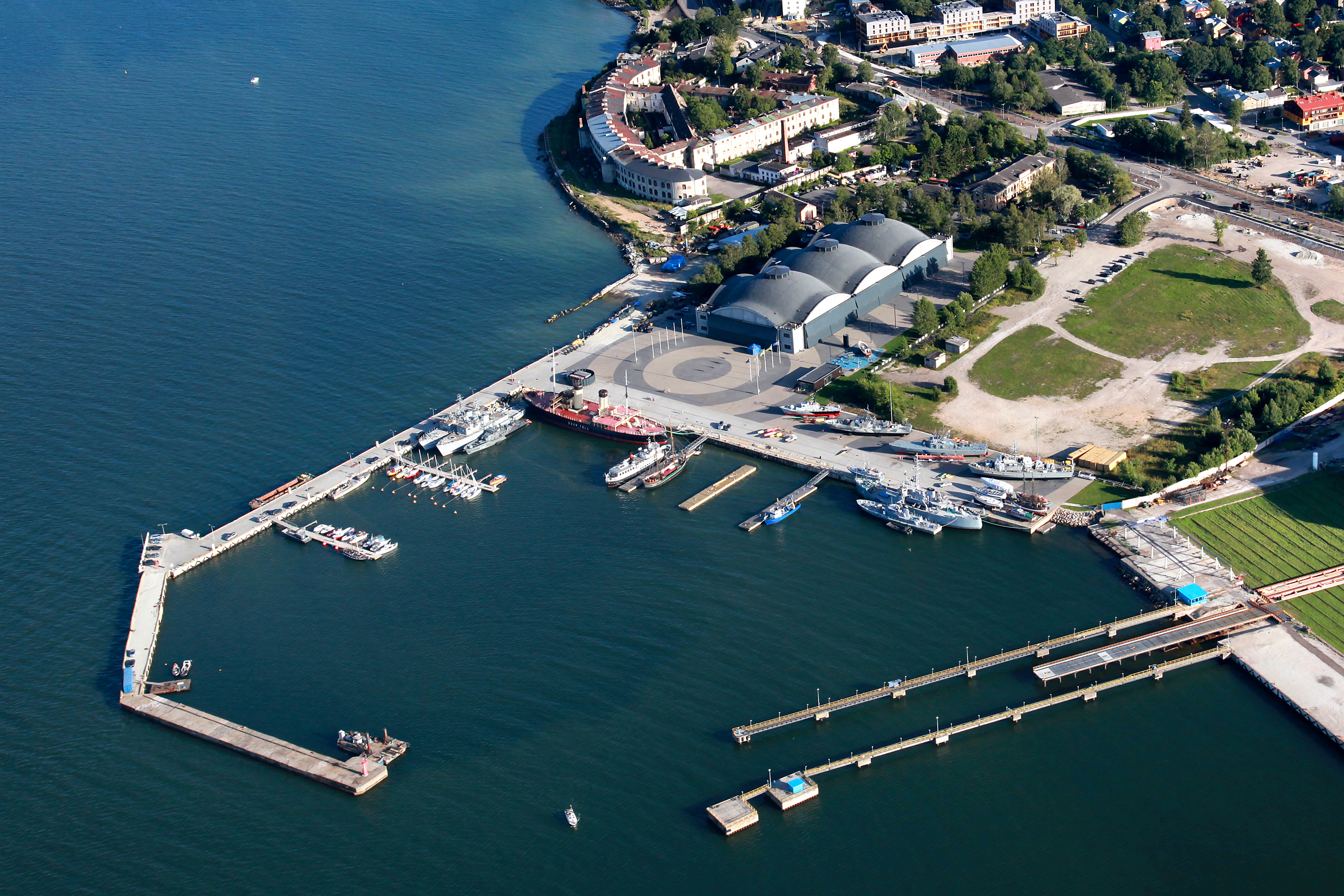
The Tallinn aeroplane harbour hangars in 2015

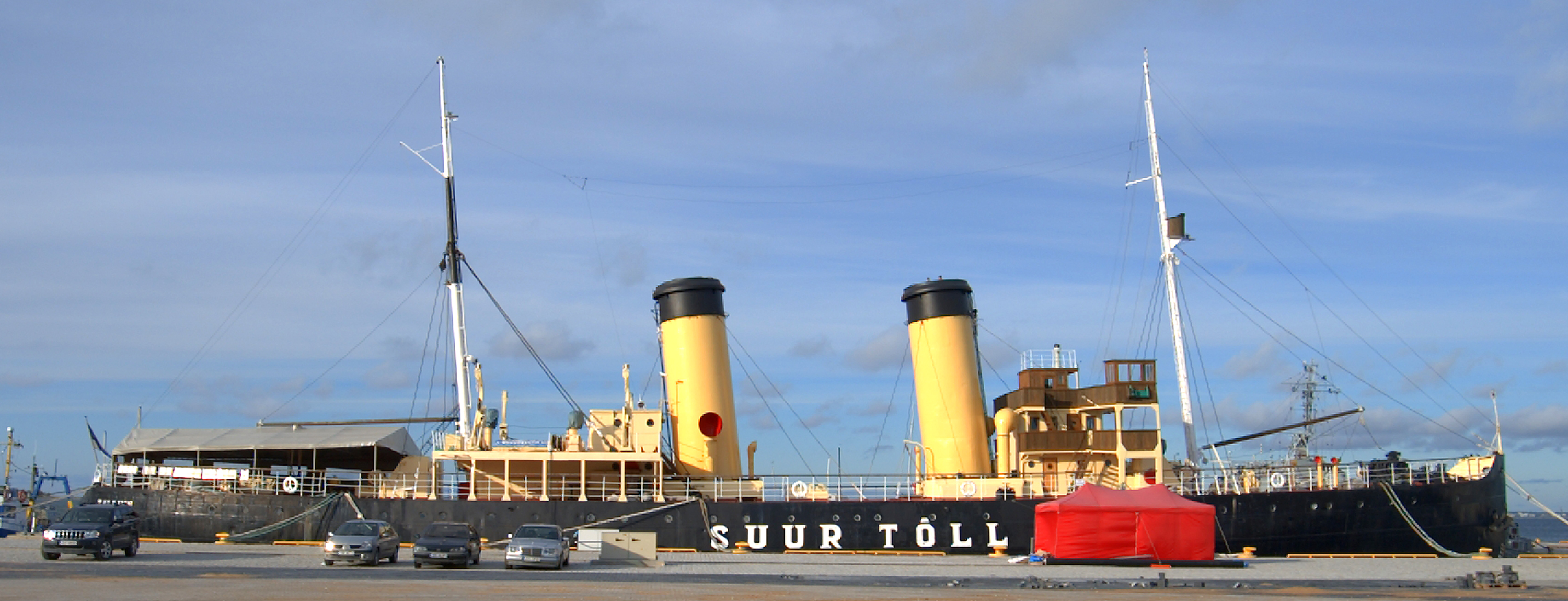
Suur Tõll icebreaker

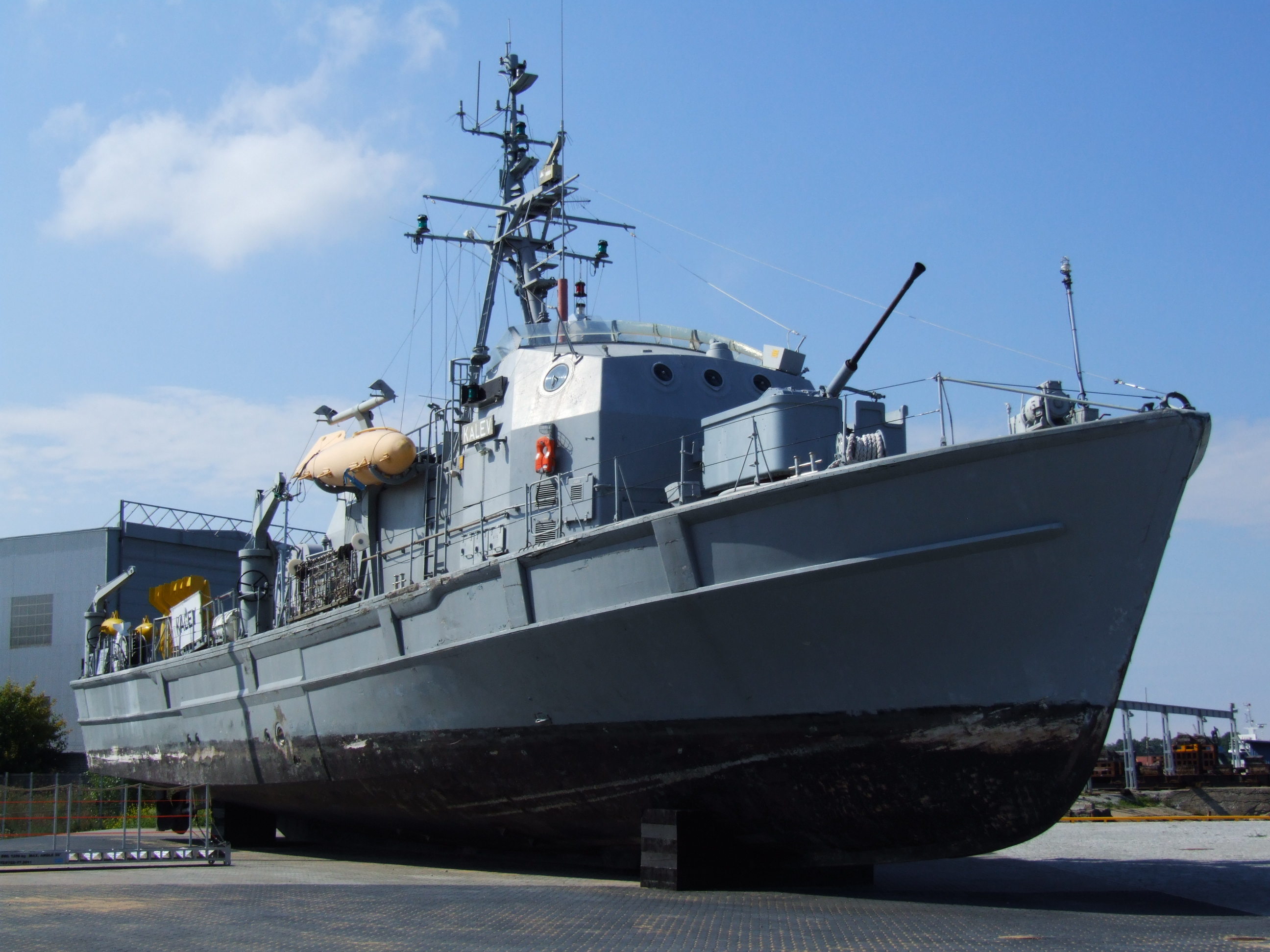
EML Kalev (M414)

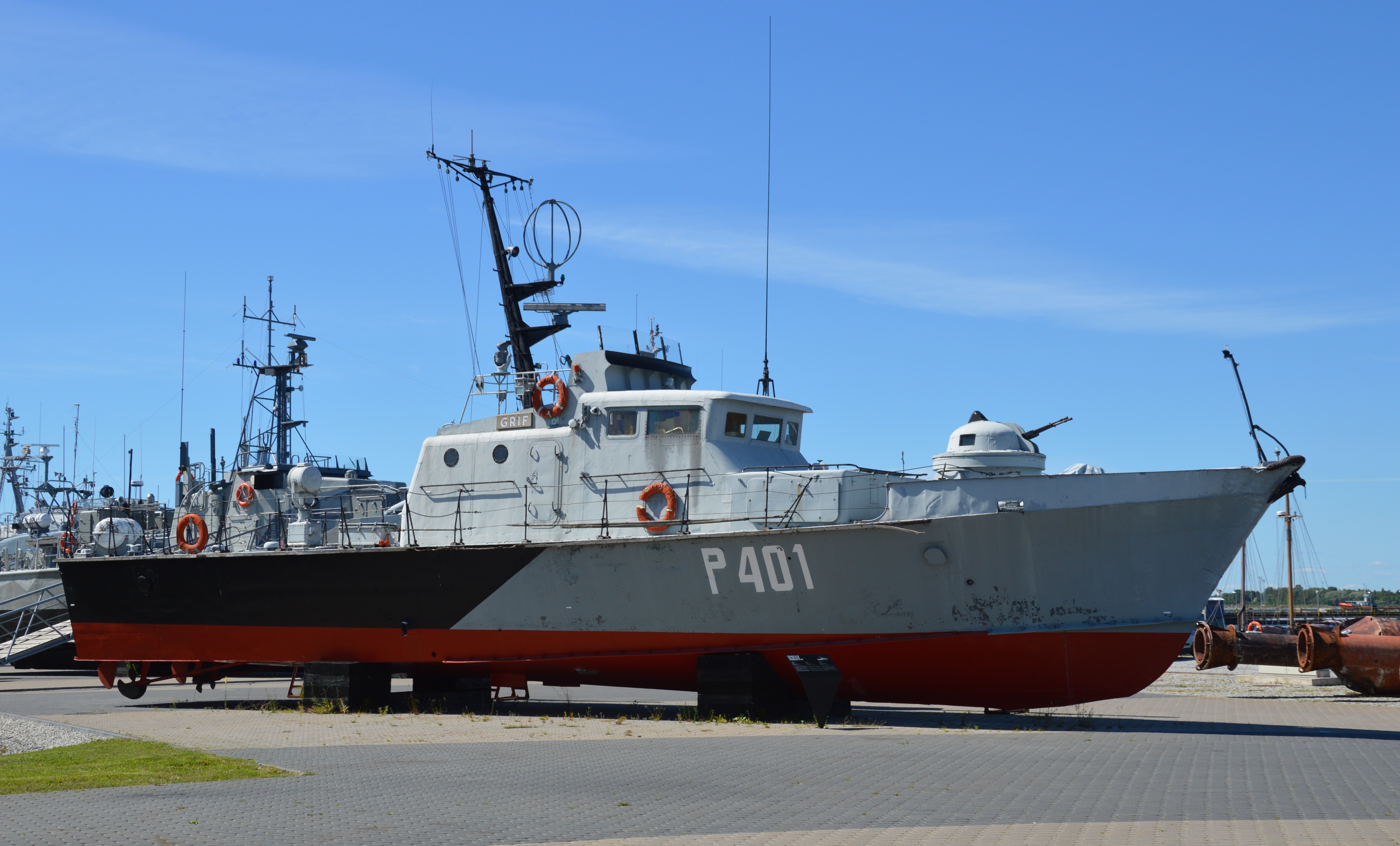
EML Grif

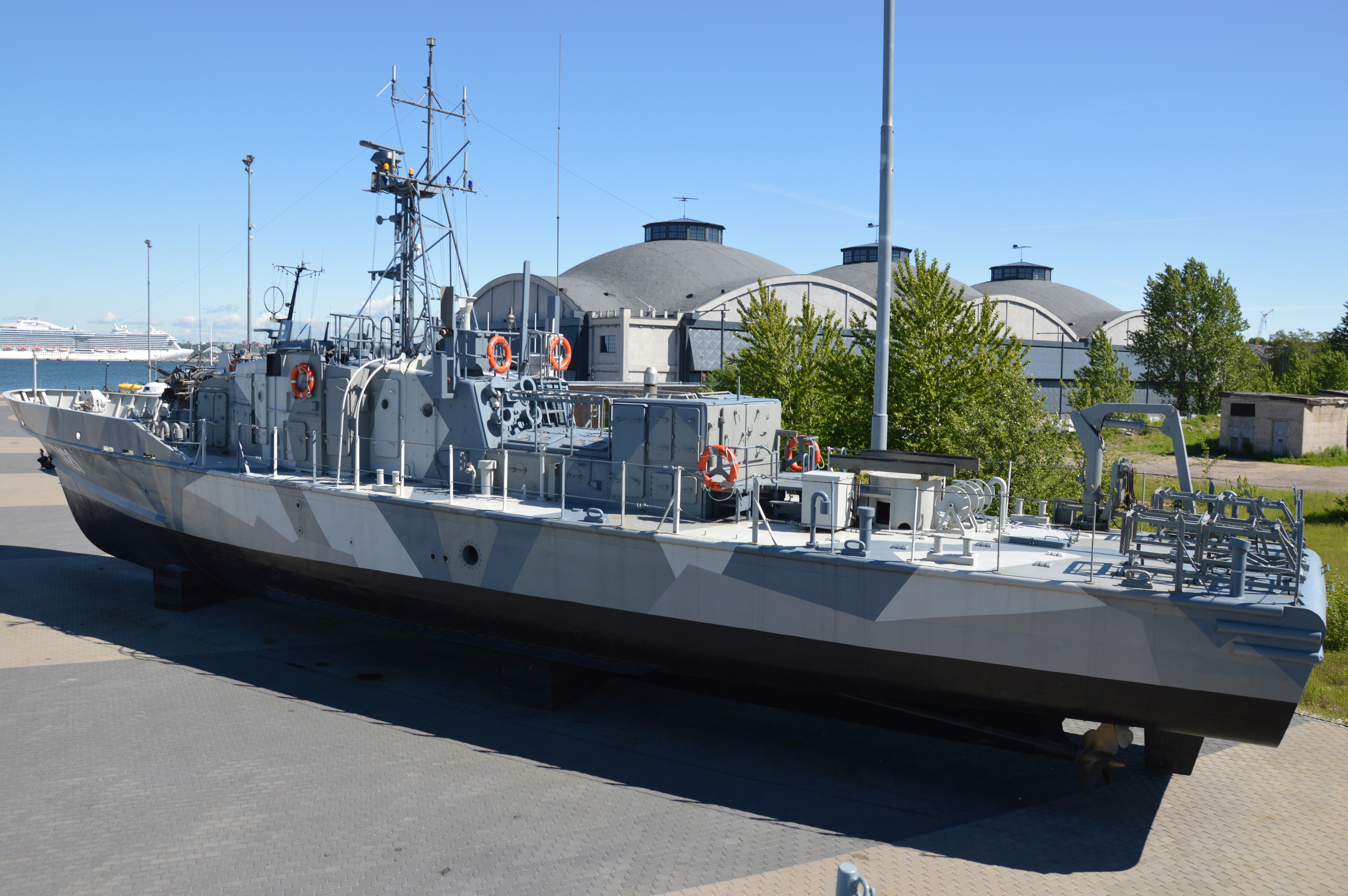
EML Suurrop

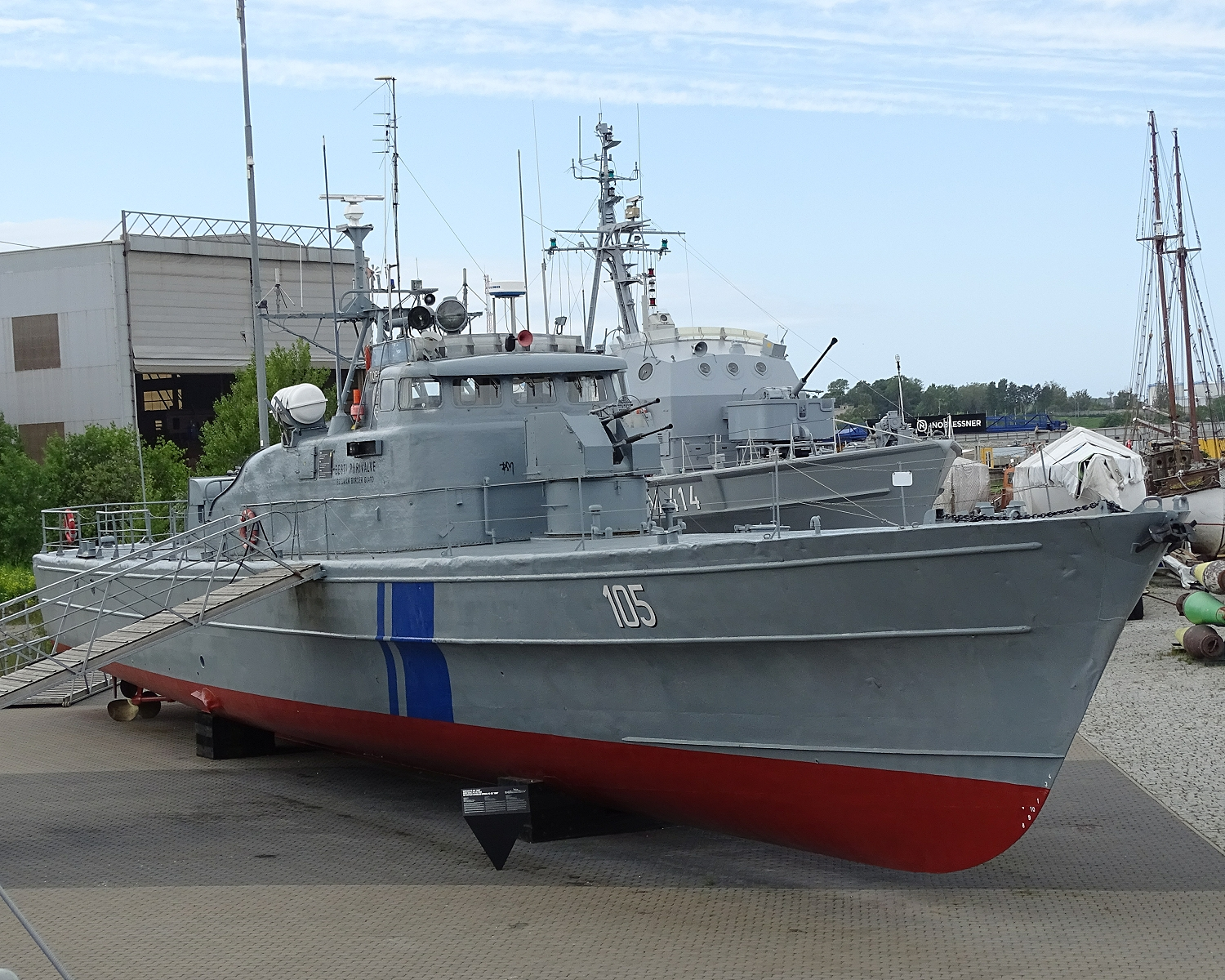
PVL 105 Torm

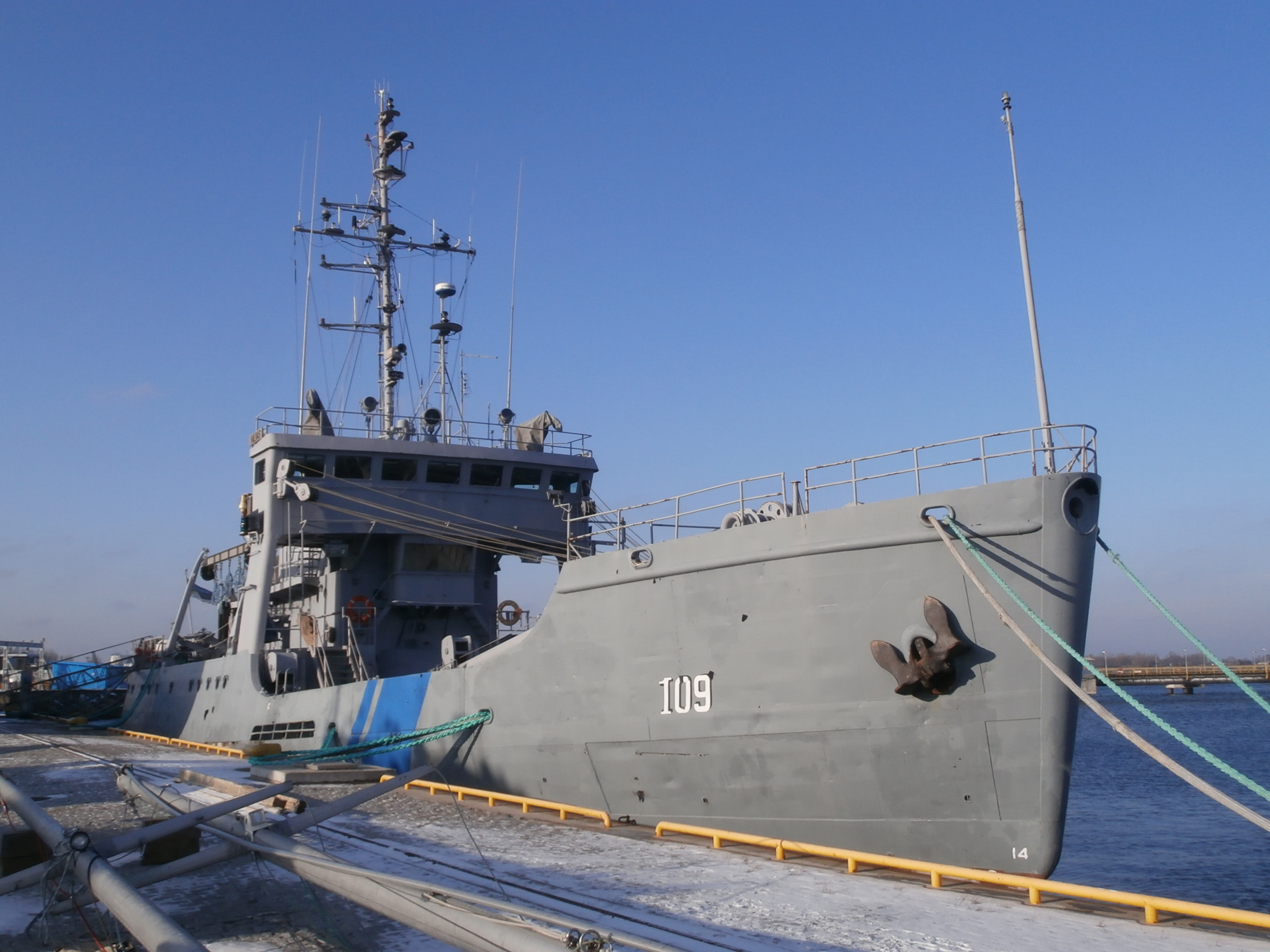
EML Valvas

== See also ==
- Põhjala Brewery - also located in Noblessner Harbour
- List of museum ships
