= List of shipwrecks in 1941 =

The list of shipwrecks in 1941 includes all ships sunk, foundered, grounded, or otherwise lost during 1941.

table of contents
1941
Jan	Feb	Mar	Apr
May	Jun	Jul	Aug
Sep	Oct	Nov	Dec
Unknown date

== Unknown date ==
List of shipwrecks: Unknown date 1941
Ship	State	Description
A 6	Royal Hellenic Navy	The A 1-class contraband chaser was lost sometime in May or June.
Atlas	Germany	World War II: The cargo ship was sunk at Emden in a Royal Air Force air raid. She was subsequently refloated.
Consul Hintz	Germany	The cargo ship was crushed against the quayside at Wilhelmshaven. She was consequently scrapped.
Corvan or Corvin)	Flag unknown	The cargo ship ran aground on Sow and Pigs Reef in Buzzards Bay off the coast of Massachusetts, United States. She drifted off the reef and sank in 100 feet (30 m) of water 1/2 nautical mile (1,000 yd) west north west of the flashing bell buoy northwest of Penikese Island at either 41°28′12″N 070°58′03″W or 41°28′00″N 070°57′20″W on an unknown date sometime before the American entry into World War II.
Frode	Norway	The cargo ship aught fire and was beached at Loshnell Bay, Oban, Argyllshire, United Kingdom. She was refloated in July 1941, repaired and returned to service.
Guglielmo Marconi	Regia Marina	World War II: The submarine failed to return from a patrol. She was lost between 28 October and 4 December.
Kalev	Soviet Navy	World War II: The Kalev-class submarine was listed as missing after 29 October 1941. One source claims she struck a mine and sank in the Baltic Sea off Hanko, Finland, on 1 November 1941.
HMS LCM 82, and HMS LCM 97	Royal Navy	The Landing Craft, Mechanized were lost sometime in August or September.
HMS LCP(L) 24, HMS LCP(L) 25, HMS LCP(L) 26, HMS LCP(L) 27, HMS LCP(L) 38, and HMS LCP(L) 82	Royal Navy	The Landing Craft Personnel (Large) were lost sometime in 1941.
HMS LCT 1	Royal Navy	World War II: The LCT-1-class Landing Craft, Tank was bombed and sunk off Piraeus, Greece sometime in April or May.
HMS LCT 6	Royal Navy	World War II: The LCT-1-class Landing Craft, Tank was scuttled off the south coast of Crete, Greece sometime in April or May.
HMS LCT 19	Royal Navy	World War II: The LCT-1-class Landing Craft, Tank was lost in the Aegean Sea sometime in April or May.
HMS LCT 20	Royal Navy	World War II: The LCT-1-class Landing Craft, Tank was bombed and sunk off Crete sometime in April or May.
Lina B	United States	The purse seiner collided with Charles L. Wheeler Jr. (United States) in fog in the Pacific Ocean near the Farallon Islands off the coast of California. The collision ripped a hole in Lina B.'s bow and disabled her steering gear.
Santiago	United States	The fuel oil storage barge – a converted barque – began leaking and was beached in Monashka Bay (57°50′N 152°25′W) on the coast of Kodiak Island near Kodiak, Territory of Alaska.
Shch-319	Soviet Navy	World War II: The Shchuka-class submarine was lost after 29 September.
Templar	United States	The motorboat was wrecked in Kuskokwim Bay in the Territory of Alaska.
HMS Triumph	Royal Navy	World War II: The T-class submarine disappeared sometime between 30 December 1941 and 9 January 1942 with the loss of all 59 crew. She possibly struck a mine and sank in the Mediterranean Sea.
