= Fat Margaret =

Wall tower in Tallinn, Estonia

Coordinates: 59°26′33″N 24°44′58″E

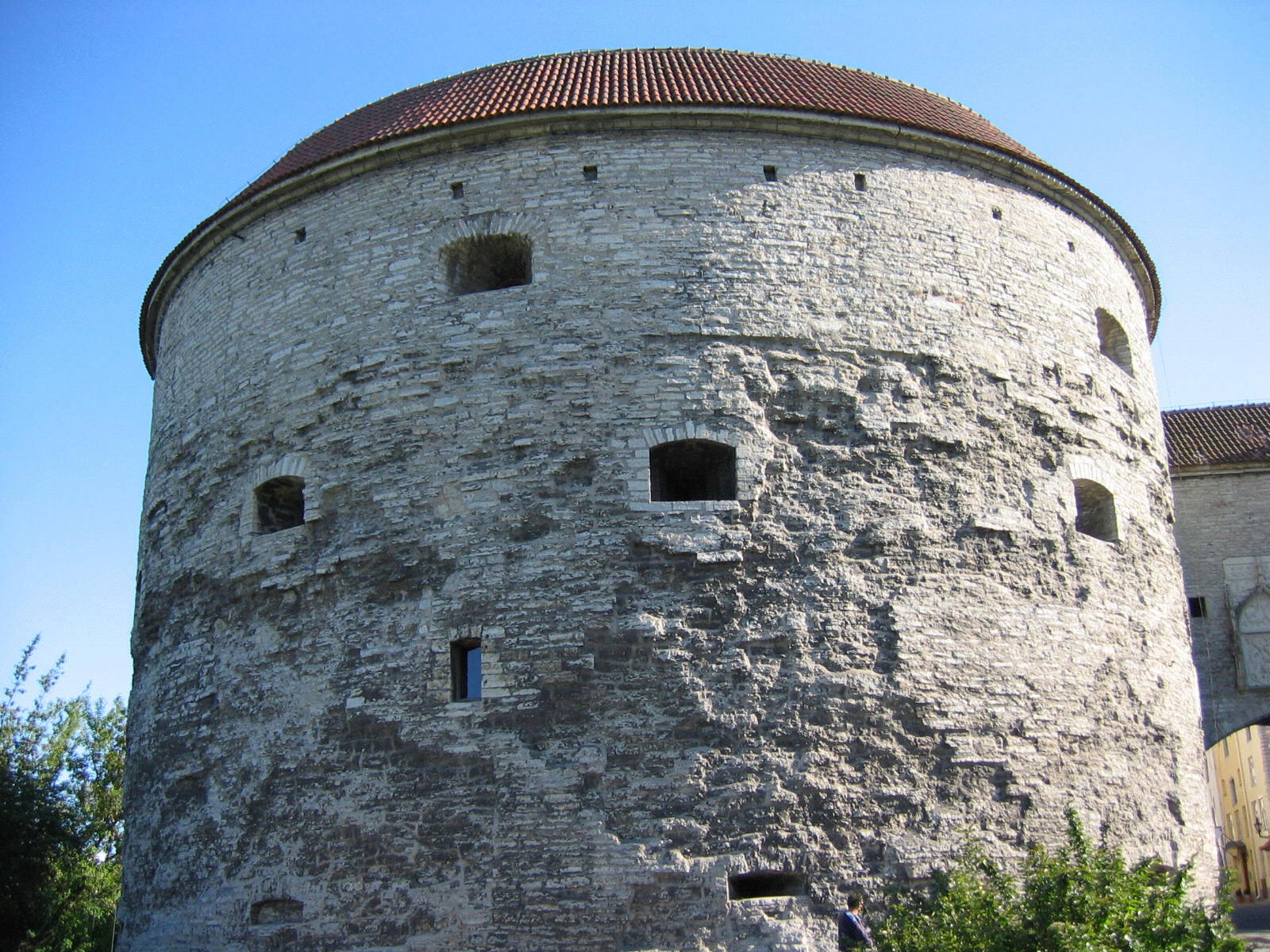
Fat Margaret

Fat Margaret (Estonian: Paks Margareeta, German: Dicke Margarethe) is a tower in Tallinn, Estonia. Nowadays, the tower is home to Estonian Maritime Museum.

The tower was built in the early 16th century (from 1511 to 1530) during the reconstruction of the medieval city gate system. The etymology of the tower's name derives from the fact that it was the largest part of the city's fortifications with walls measuring 25 meters in diameter, 20 meters in height, and up to 5 meters thick. Apart from being a fortification against potential invaders to the port of the town, it was also built to impress outside visitors arriving by sea.

The tower is a defensive structure at the end of Pikk tänav (Long Street). Together with Suur Rannavärav (the Great Coastal Gate), a sixteenth-century arch flanked by two towers, it served to defend Tallinn's harbor. Later, it was used as a storehouse for gunpowder and weapons, and then transformed into a prison, and it was the scene of an outbreak of violence during the 1917 Revolution, when the prison guards were murdered by a mob of workers, soldiers, and sailors. In the 1920s there were plans to convert it into an artists' home. The tower was reconstructed from 1978 to 1981 to house the Maritime Museum. A cafe with a seating area overlooking the sea is very comfortable for tourists.
