= Suur Tõll (icebreaker) =

1914 Estonian ship

Coordinates: 59.4531°N 24.7387°E

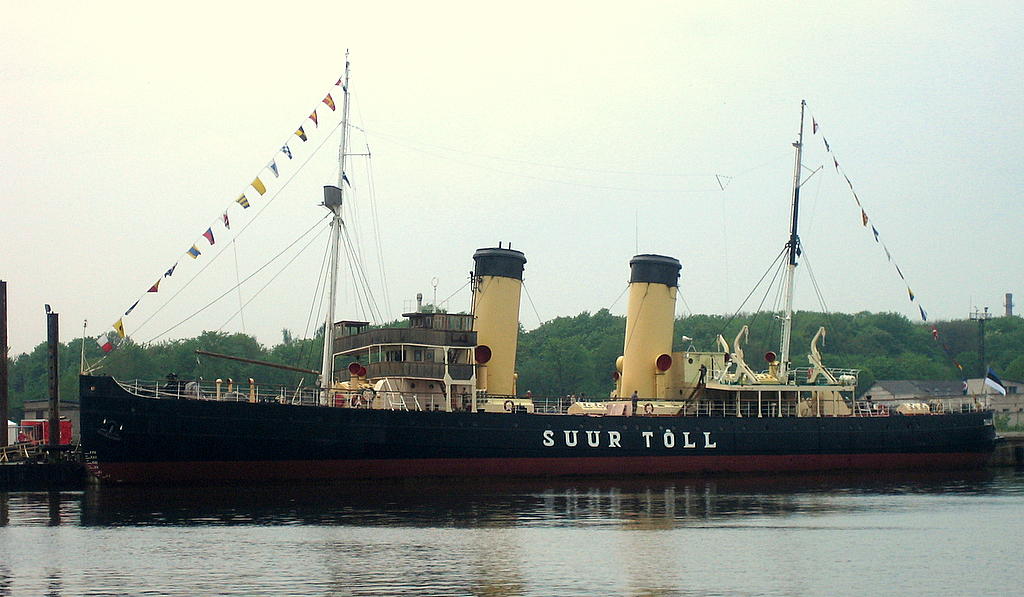
- Suur Tõll at the Maritime Days in Tallinn on 27 May 2007.

History

Russian Empire
- Name: Tsar Mikhail Feodorovich (Царь Михаилъ Ѳеодоровичъ)
- Port of registry: Tallinn, Estonia
- Ordered: 1912
- Builder: Vulcan Werft, Stettin, Germany
- Yard number: 345
- Launched: 26 December 1913
- Commissioned: 27 May 1914
- In service: 1914–1917

Soviet Russia
- Name: Volynets (Волынец)
- In service: 1917–1918

Finland
- Name: Wäinämöinen
- In service: 1918–1922

Estonia
- Name: Suur Tõll
- In service: 1922–1940

Soviet Union
- Name: Volynets (Волынец)
- In service: 1940–1985

Estonia
- Name: Suur Tõll
- Owner: Estonian Maritime Museum
- Acquired: 13 October 1988
- Status: Museum ship in Tallinn, Estonia

General characteristics (as built)
- Type: Icebreaker
- Tonnage: 2,417 GRT
- Displacement: 3,619 tons
- Length: 75.4 m (247 ft)
- Beam: 19.2 m (63 ft)
- Draft: 5.7 m (19 ft)
- Boilers: Six coal-fired boilers with mechanical ventilation
- Engines: Three triple-expansion steam engines, 2,300 ihp (1,700 kW) each
- Propulsion: Three propellers; two in stern and one in bow
- Crew: 62–65
- Armament: 4 × 76 mm guns; 4 × 45 mm guns

Suur Tõll is an Estonian steam-powered icebreaker preserved in the Estonian Maritime Museum in Tallinn. She was originally built for the Russian Empire in 1914 by AG Vulcan in Stettin, Germany, as Tsar Mikhail Feodorovich. In 1917, she was taken over by the Bolsheviks and renamed Volynets. However, in 1918 she was captured by Finland and served as Wäinämöinen until 1922, when she was handed over to Estonia according to the Treaty of Tartu and renamed Suur Tõll. When Estonia was occupied by the Soviet Union in 1940, the icebreaker rejoined the Soviet fleet and was again named Volynets. She remained in service until 1985.

The Soviet Navy decided to sell the decommissioned icebreaker for scrap, and she was purchased by the Estonian Maritime Museum in 1987. The ship was given back her original Estonian name and was extensively renovated; Suur Tõll, the largest preserved pre-war icebreaker in the world, is currently moored at Lennusadam, the historical seaplane harbour in Tallinn.

== History ==
=== Early career (1914–1918) ===
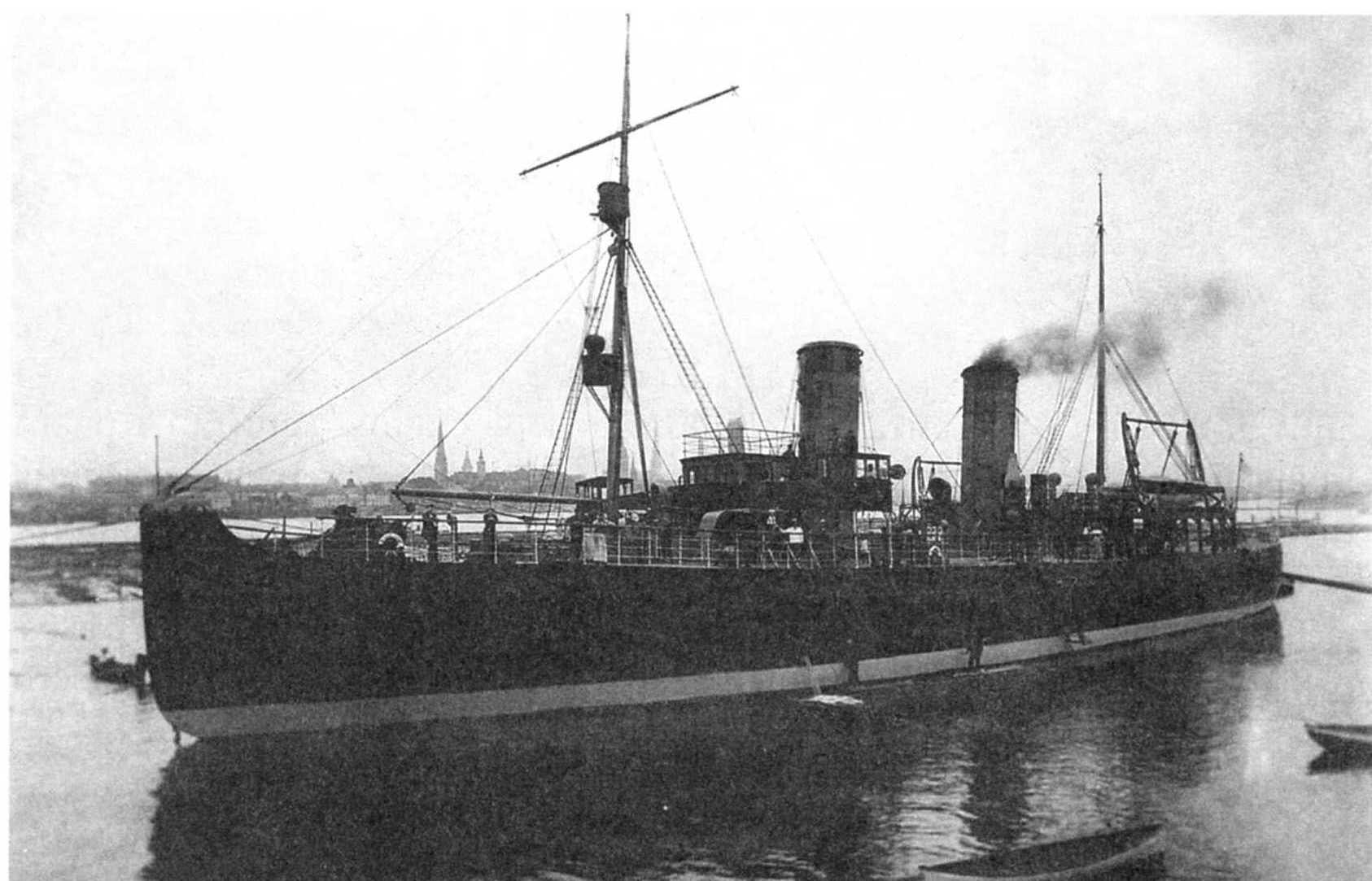
The Imperial Russian Tsar Mikhail Feodorovich.

In 1912, the Imperial Russian government organized a request for tender for the construction of a large steam-powered icebreaker designed specifically for the ice conditions of the Baltic Sea. The shipbuilding contract was awarded to the German shipyard Stettiner Maschinenbau AG Vulcan and the vessel, christened Tsar Mikhail Feodorovich (Царь Михаилъ Ѳеодоровичъ) after Michael of Russia, was ready for launching on 26 December 1913. In the following spring, the new icebreaker carried out sea trials off the coast of Finland. Tsar Mikhail Feodorovich was presented to the general public in St. Petersburg on 26 May and on the following day she was officially handed over to Russia. In 1915, two armed icebreakers of similar design, Knyaz Pojarskiy and Kozma Minin, were constructed in England.

Tsar Mikhail Feodorovich arrived to her homeport, Tallinn, on 2 July 1914. When Germany declared war on Russia on 1 August 1914 and the First World War began, the icebreaker was armed and 96 soldiers were stationed on her. During the war, the icebreaker operated in the Gulf of Finland, where she carried troops and material, and escorted transportation vessels between Tallinn and Helsinki. In 1916, she was drydocked in Kronstadt.

On 12 March 1917, the Volhynian Guard Regiment from Petrograd mutinied against their Tsarist officers and joined the revolutionary Bolsheviks. Following the February Revolution, Tsar Mikhail Feodorovich was renamed Volynets to honor the regiment on 15 May 1917. During the winter of 1918, Volynets assisted the retreating Baltic Fleet — the Ice Cruise of the Baltic Fleet — together with another large Russian icebreaker, Yermak.

=== Wäinämöinen (1918–1922) ===
After the failed attempt to capture the small Finnish icebreaker Avance from the Russian revolutionaries in March 1918, Finnish captain Theodor Segersven and his men shifted their focus to the much larger Volynets. On 29 March 1918, 53 men dressed as workers boarded the icebreaker and Segersven presented a forged written order for the ship's political commissar claiming that he and his men were to be transported to Kuivasaari for construction work. When the icebreaker passed the lighthouse of Harmaja, the men broke into the ship's weapons storage and shortly afterwards the Russian crew of 116, half of them armed guards, had been taken into custody. In the evening Volynets, flying the Finnish flag under the command of Segersven, arrived in Tallinn, where she was welcomed by a group of high-ranking German officers, including Prince Henry of Prussia. On 28 April 1918 the captured icebreaker was renamed Wäinämöinen after the legendary Finnish hero. This caused some discontent with the crew who had held a naming contest while the icebreaker was moored in Tallinn and chosen the name Leijona after the Lion of Finland.

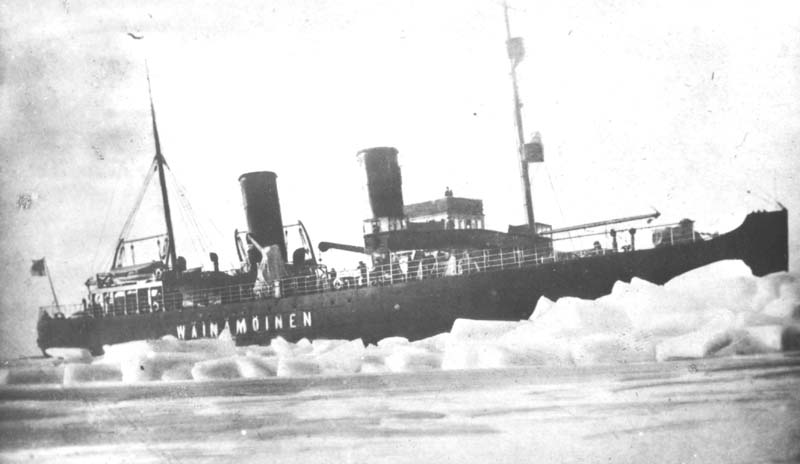
The Finnish icebreaker Wäinämöinen after the Civil War.

Shortly after the capture Wäinämöinen was used to transport 3,000 German soldiers — Detachment Brandenstein — to Loviisa together with Tarmo, another Finnish icebreaker. The Germans supplied her with coal and provisions and she spent most of the spring assisting German ships between Helsinki and Tallinn. On 3 June 1918 Wäinämöinen was officially handed over to the Finnish Board of Navigation and became the largest and most powerful icebreaker in the Finnish state-owned fleet. Captain Segersven was replaced by Polish-Estonian Stanislaus Juhnewicz, the ship's original captain who had joined forces with the Finns during the capture after having been promised a government post by Gustaf Wrede, the director of the Board of Navigation.

Although Wäinämöinen was an invaluable addition to the Finnish icebreaker fleet, she was not used as extensively as the smaller state-owned icebreakers due to her high fuel consumption and the shortage of coal shortly after the war. In addition to icebreaker duties she was used to transport volunteers across the Gulf of Finland to participate in the Estonian War of Independence. In September 1919 she was drydocked in Suomenlinna, but while the repair work was completed in late October, she could not leave the shipyard until 24 November due to her deep draft and the particularly low sea level. During the particularly harsh winter of 1922 she assisted 170 ships to and from the Finnish ports. Her last task under the Finnish flag was to open the South Harbour in Helsinki on 16 April 1922.

During her years under the Finnish flag Wäinämöinen demonstrated the advantages of a large icebreaker and that such vessel was definitely needed in Finland. As a result, the Finnish Board of Navigation decided to order a large icebreaker based on her basic design and the experiences gained during her operation. The new icebreaker, Jääkarhu, was delivered in 1926.

=== Suur Tõll (1922–1940) ===
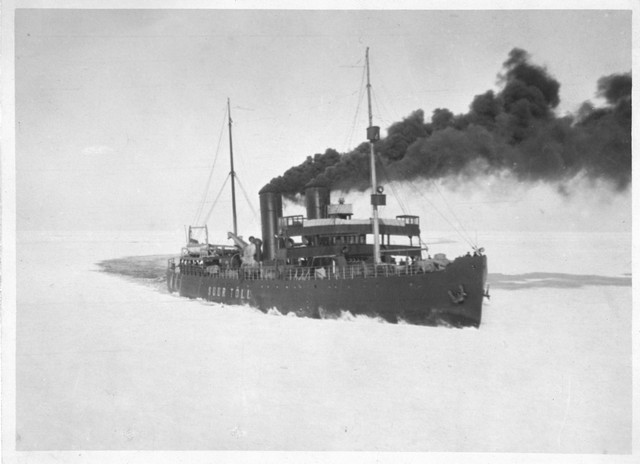
Suur Tõll assisting FÅA's Wellamo between Helsinki and Stettin in 1928.

When Finland signed the Treaty of Tartu on 14 October 1920, it had agreed to return the Russian icebreakers seized by the Finnish White Guard during the Civil War. However, instead of the Soviet Union Wäinämöinen was handed over to Estonia on 20 November 1922 and renamed Suur Tõll after Toell the Great, a great giant from the Estonian mythology. During the era of Estonian independence in the 1920s and 1930s, she assisted ships mainly outside Tallinn in the southern Gulf of Finland, but sometimes sailed as far south as the coast of Lithuania. Her last winter in 1940 was so difficult that Suur Tõll had to escort ships all the way from Stockholm and Danzig to Tallinn.

In the 1920s, Estonia did not possess a dry dock large enough to accommodate the 3,619-ton Suur Tõll and as a result the icebreaker was drydocked in Copenhagen, Denmark, in 1923. As a response, the Tallinn-based Riigi Laevatehased combined their 2,000-ton and 3,000-ton floating docks with pontoons. In 1927, the shipyard replaced Suur Tõll's old boilers with new ones purchased from Vulcan and heightened the bridge by one deck to improve visibility over the bow.

=== Volynets (1940–1987) ===
When the Soviet Union occupied Estonia in June 1940, Suur Tõll was transferred to the Soviet fleet. On 27–29 August 1941, she participated in the evacuation of Tallinn, joining the convoy led by Soviet cruiser Kirov while carrying 980 passengers and hundreds of tons of military supplies. Although the convoy suffered heavy losses — over half of the 67 civilian ships were destroyed and around 6,000 people died — Volynets, steaming in front of Kirov, managed to evade the bombs dropped at it and arrived in Kronstadt unharmed. However, on 11 September the icebreaker was hit by three incendiary bombs which caused minor damage to the vessel. Following a secret decision to scuttle all vessels in the port of Leningrad to prevent capture, depth charges and other explosives were placed in the engine rooms and boiler rooms. However, these were later removed when the icebreaker was pressed into naval service.

On 4 October 1941, Suur Tõll was transferred to the Soviet Navy and armed with four 45 mm anti-aircraft guns. Two weeks later, her Estonian crew was replaced by Soviet Navy sailors and on 11 November she was given back her old name, Volynets. However, it was not until 25 January 1942 that she raised the naval ensign. At the same time, her armament was increased with two 76 mm anti-aircraft guns and later she received two more guns of the same type. During the Siege of Leningrad and the resulting shortage of coal, Volynets mostly remained in the port as a stationary anti-aircraft battery. She had also struck naval mines twice, first on 24 November 1942 when three small mines caused minor damage to her bow and then again in January 1945.

After the war, Volynets was used for towing captured vessels from Germany and Poland to shipyards in Leningrad. Still flying the naval ensign, she was transferred to the auxiliary fleet on 29 April 1948 and stationed in the Western Gulf of Finland. In 1951–1952, Volynets was extensively refitted at Rauma-Repola shipyard in Rauma as part of the Finnish war reparations to the Soviet Union. The refit included replacing her old coal-fired boilers with new Swedish-built oil-fired boilers and almost complete rebuilding of her superstructure.

In 1957, Volynets was transferred to Kronstadt where she remained for the remainder of her active career. Equipped with large pumps and extensive fire-fighting outfit, the old icebreaker was stationed at the shipyard where the Red Fleet demolished its old warships. In 1966, two ships once named after the hero of the Finnish national epic Kalevala met for the last time when Vyborg, the former Finnish coastal defence ship Väinämöinen that had been handed over to the Soviet Union as part of the war reparations, was broken up at the naval scrapyard.

While the scrapping of the obsolete steam-powered icebreaker was planned already in 1967, Volynets remained in service until 1985. In the following year, she was used to supply steam during the construction of the naval port in Primorsk, but was afterwards returned to Lomonosov. She was finally slated for demolition in late 1987.

=== Return to Estonia (1987–) ===
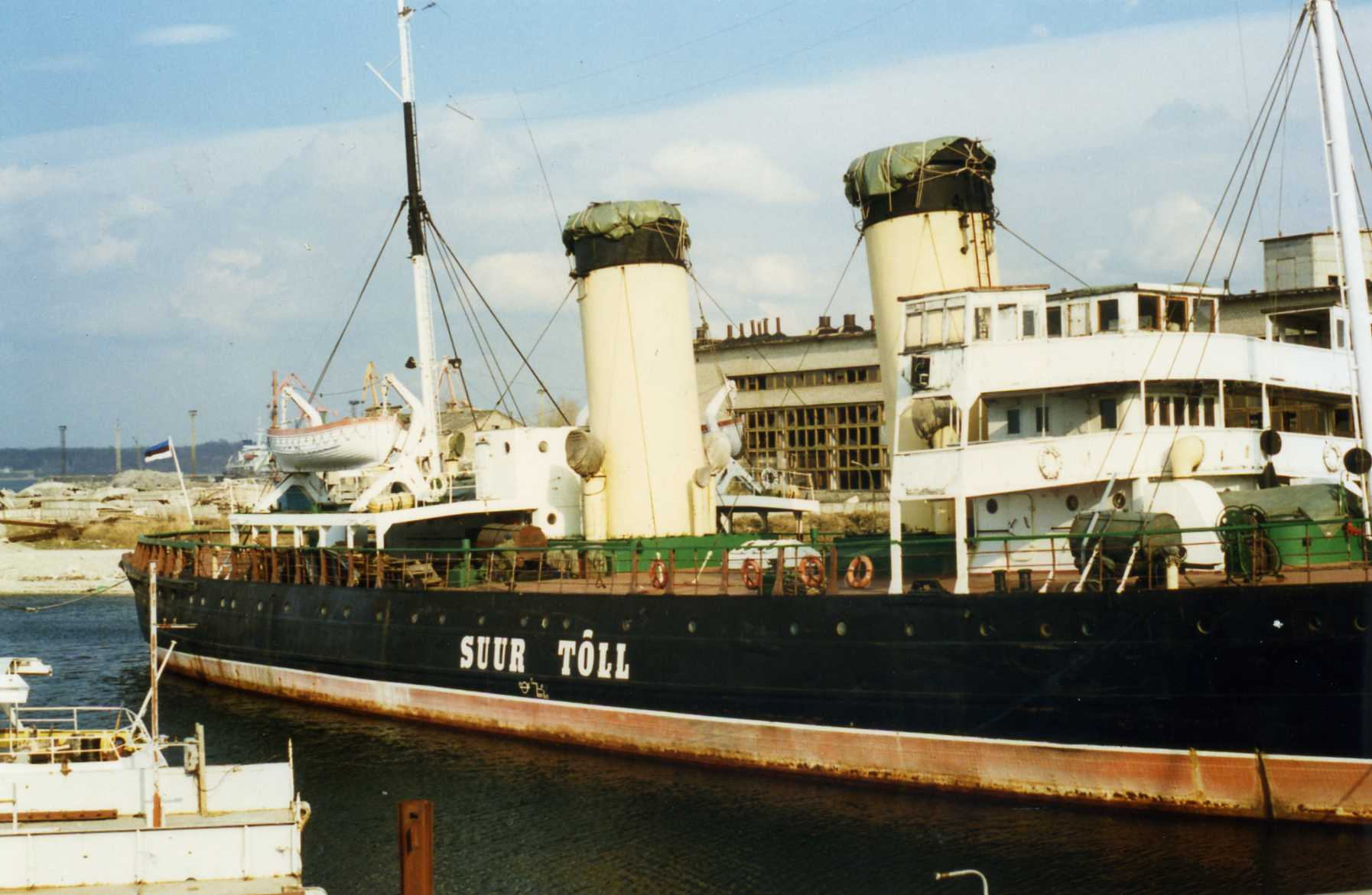
Suur Tõll under restoration in May 1996.

When Ants Pärna, the director of the Estonian Maritime Museum, found out that Volynets was going to be scrapped, he decided to purchase the icebreaker for the museum in order to preserve it. After a long negotiation, the Commander-in-Chief of the Soviet Navy agreed to trade the ship for 300 tons of scrap iron. On 10 October 1988, a delegation from the Estonian Maritime Museum arrived at Lomonosov to inspect the old icebreaker. When the seagoing tugboat Tjulen began towing her towards Tallinn in the following evening, the other ships in the port saluted the old icebreaker with their horns. 31 hours later, on 13 October 1988, Volynets dropped her anchor outside the port of Tallinn. On 21 November 1988, the icebreaker was given back her old name, Suur Tõll. On 24 August 1991, four days after Estonia regained full independence, she raised the blue-black-white flag of Estonia for the first time and on 23 December she became the first ship to be added to the newly founded Estonian Ship Register with register number 001. She was opened to the general public on 2 December 1994.

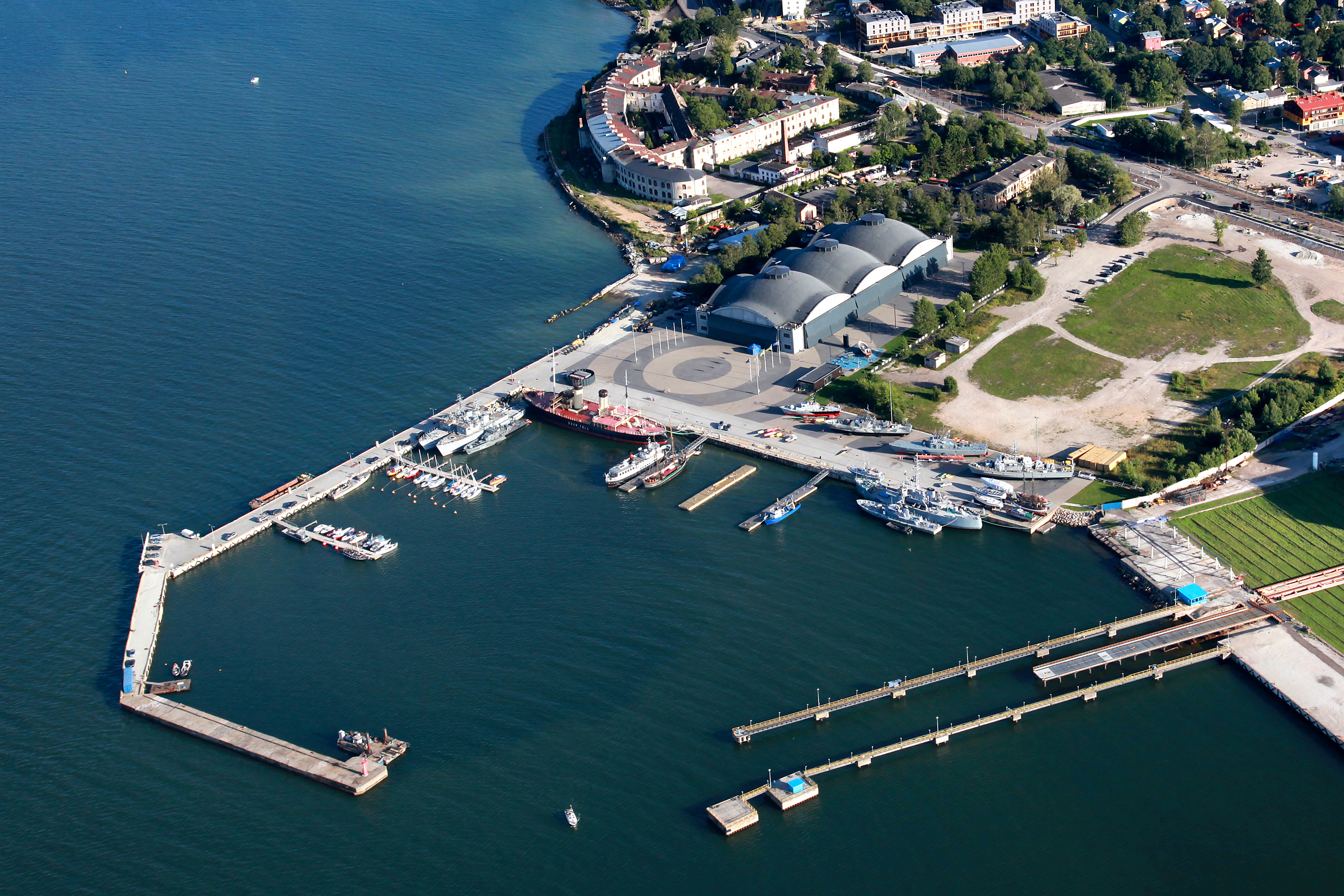
Estonian Maritime Museum, Seaplane Harbour

The restoration of Suur Tõll has been an enormous task which has included cleaning garbage accumulated in the ship over the years and finding the missing fittings, including the helm that had been swapped to a steering wheel of a truck during the night before the departure and the large bronze bell of the icebreaker which was found in a military museum in Leningrad. However, not everything had been stolen — for example, the old German piano was still in the saloon because it was too big to be transported away. While the original piano was destroyed in the First World War, the current musical instrument is from the same manufacturer and dates back to the early 20th century. Despite the limited funding and materials, Suur Tõll was largely restored during the 1990s. In 1997, it was found out that the rivets under the waterline were leaking water and the icebreaker was drydocked at Balti Laevaremonditehas for the first time since 1986. However, over the years the hull of the old icebreaker had deteriorated even further, flooding the tanks with a mixture of water and black oil. In 2011, the Estonian Maritime Administration requested the Estonian Maritime Museum to draw up a restoration plan to save the vessel. In September 2013, Suur Tõll was closed for renovations which included extensive repairs to the hull in a dry dock. While the icebreaker retained her 1950s post-refit outfit, the saloon was restored to its original 1910s Art Nouveau style. She was re-opened to visitors in 2014.

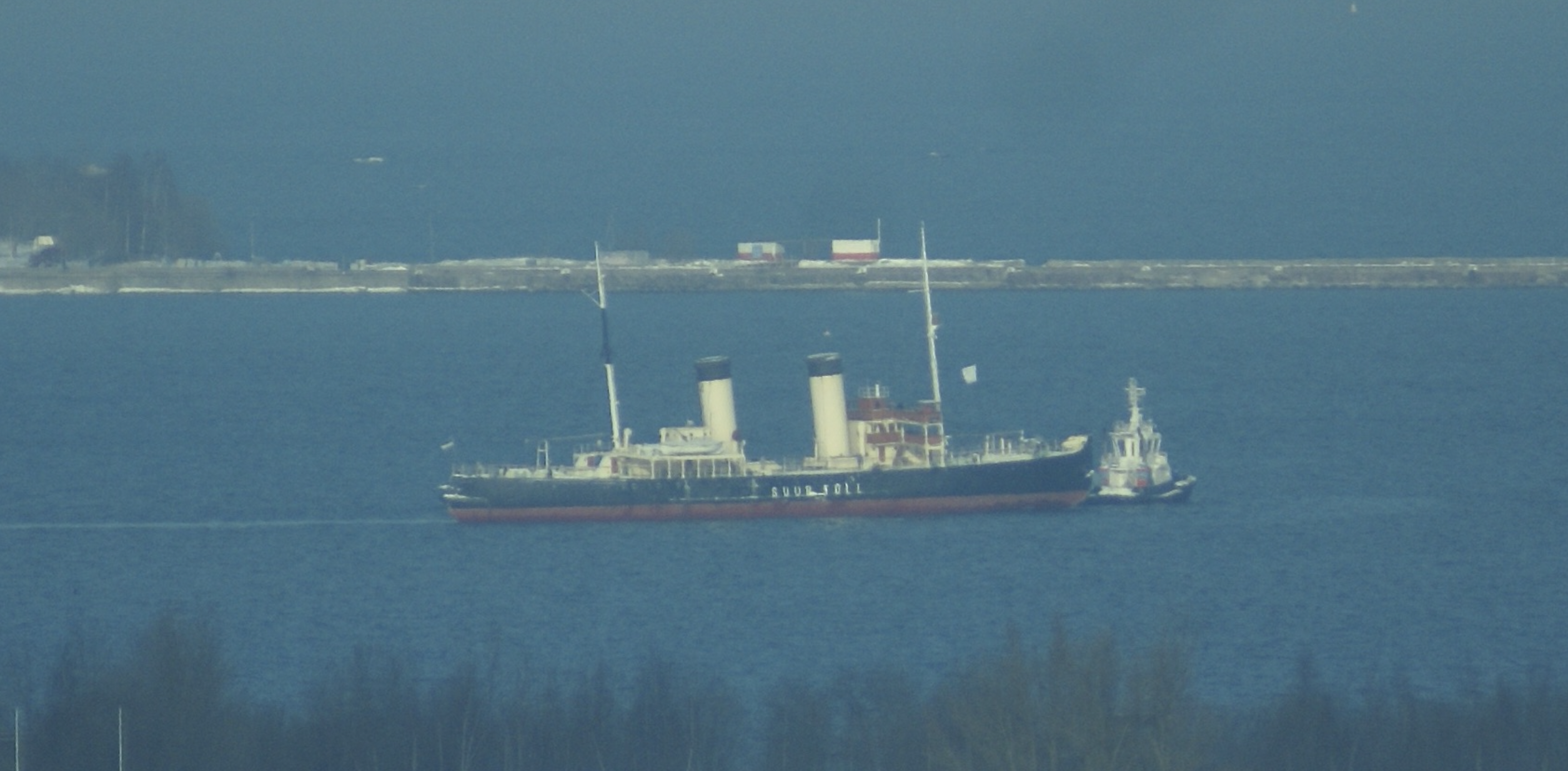
Suur Tõll in Tallinn Roadstead, 22nd February 2023

In the 1990s, Suur Tõll visited Finland twice. In 1993, she was towed to Kotka to participate the annual maritime festival (Kotkan Meripäivät). During the spring of 1998, the Estonian diesel-electric icebreaker Tarmo towed her to Helsinki for a couple of days to celebrate the 80th anniversary of the independent Estonia as well as capturing of the two steam-powered icebreakers, the other being the 1907-built Tarmo which has been preserved as a museum ship in Finland. While Suur Tõll has not moved under her own power since 1994, the Estonian Maritime Museum intends to return her boilers and steam engines to operational status.

Suur Tõll is the largest preserved pre-war steam-powered icebreaker in the world, bigger than both the Finnish Tarmo and the Swedish Sankt Erik. Although the Russian icebreaker Krasin, built in 1917, is considerably larger than Suur Tõll, she was extensively modernized in the 1950s and retains hardly any resemblance to the other icebreakers of the time.

== Technical details ==
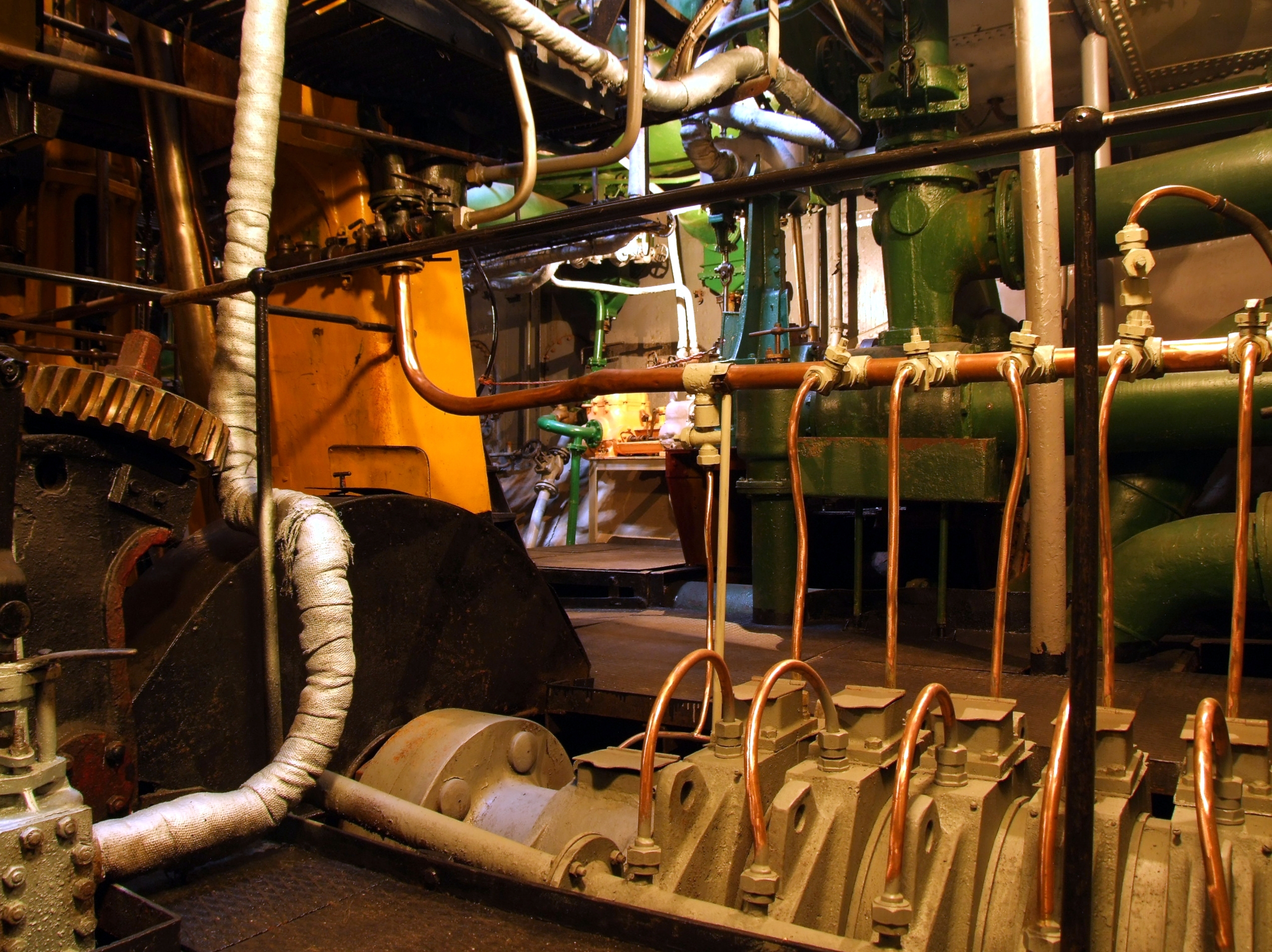
Engine room

Suur Tõll is 75.4 metres (247 ft) long and has a beam of 19.2 metres (63 ft), and at a draft of 5.7 metres (19 ft) her displacement is 3,619 tons. Her hull, strengthened by a cast iron stem and a large number of longitudinal and transverse bulkheads, is surrounded by an ice belt with a width of 2 metres (6.6 ft) and thickness of one inch (25 mm). To assist icebreaking in difficult conditions she is also equipped with heeling tanks and pumps capable of transferring 570 tons of water from one side to another in ten minutes, listing the ship by 10 degrees. Furthermore, her trim could be adjusted by a forepeak tank with a capacity of 600 tons of water. All tanks were connected to an electrical control and indication system.

Powered by three 2,300 ihp triple-expansion steam engines, two driving four-bladed propellers in the stern and one powering a third propeller in the bow, Suur Tõll was one of the most powerful icebreakers in the Gulf of Finland. All moving parts had been dimensioned 35% stronger than in other ships of similar power. She had six coal-fired boilers equipped with mechanical ventilation, burning 3.5 tons of coal per hour in normal operation and four tons during ramming. Her fuel stores could hold 700 tons of coal, almost as much as the cargo capacity of a small cargo ship of the time.

When Suur Tõll was delivered in 1914, she was one of the most modern icebreakers in the world. Extensively electrified, she had electrical lighting and her anchor windlass, winches and two coal cranes were all powered by electricity to avoid having easily freezing steam pipes on the deck. Furthermore, she had an electrical salvage pump that could be transported to a grounded ship in a boat or on a sledge over ice without bringing the icebreaker too close to the shallow waters. When delivered, her radio station had a range of 400 kilometres (220 nautical miles), but it was later increased to 1,100 kilometres (590 nautical miles).

== See also ==
- Barcelona Charter

== Bibliography ==
- Kaukiainen, Yrjö (1992). Navigare Necesse – Merenkulkulaitos 1917–1992. Jyväskylä: Gummerus Kirjapaino Oy. ISBN 951-47-6776-4.
- Laurell, Seppo (1992). Höyrymurtajien aika. Jyväskylä: Gummerus Kirjapaino Oy. ISBN 951-47-6775-6.
