= EML Lembit =

1936 Estonian ship

Coordinates: 59.4517°N 24.7387°E

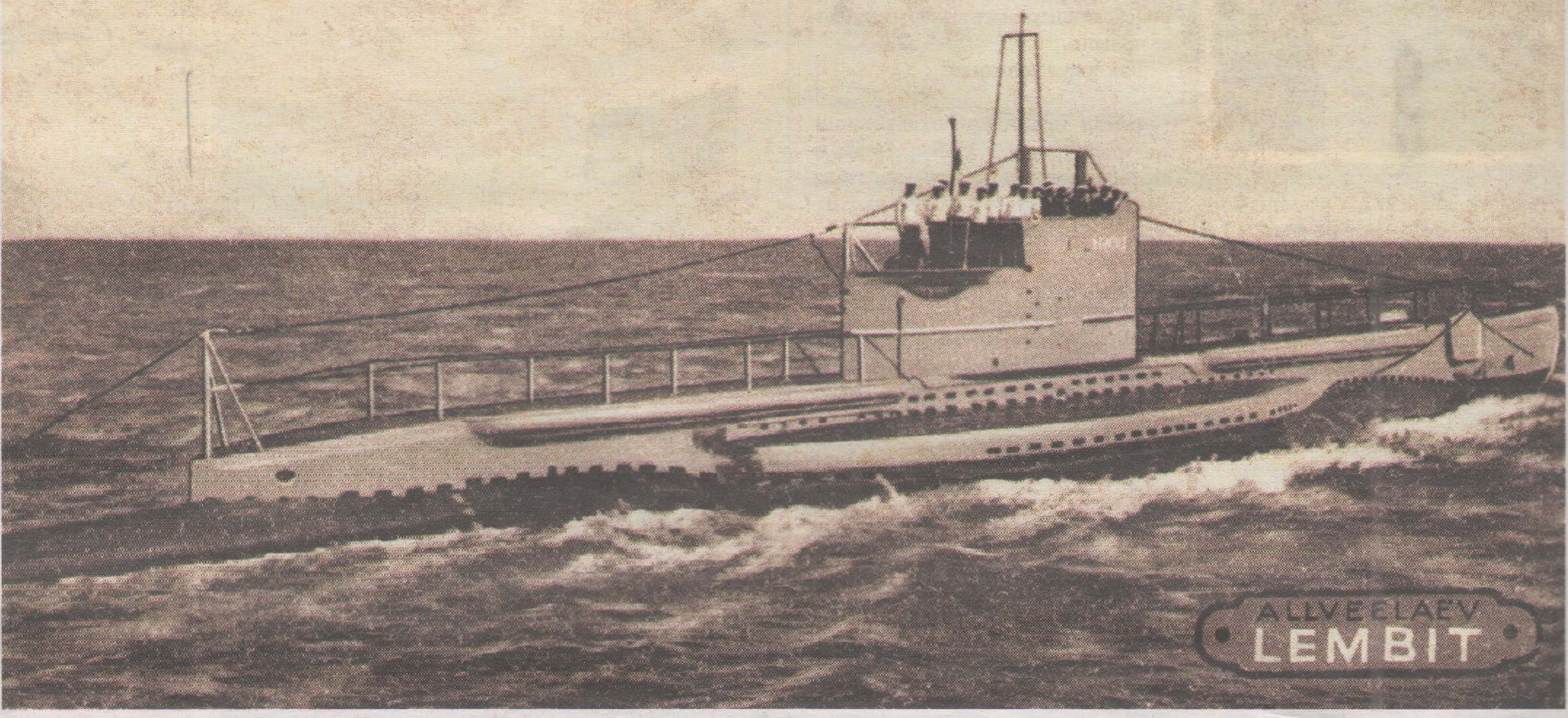
- Stern quarter view of EML Lembit, underway while in service.

History

Estonia
- Name: Lembit
- Namesake: Lembitu
- Ordered: 12 December 1934
- Builder: Vickers-Armstrongs
- Laid down: 19 June 1935
- Launched: 7 July 1936 13:07
- Commissioned: 14 May 1937
- In service: 1937 - 1940
- Home port: Tallinn
- Motto: "Vääri oma nime" ("Be worthy of your name")
- Captured: Soviet Union in 1940

Soviet Union
- Name: Lembit
- In service: 1940 - 1979
- Out of service: 1979
- Home port: Tallinn, Leningrad
- Nickname(s): "Immortal submarine"
- Honours and awards: Order of Red Banner (1945)
- Captured: From Estonia in 1940
- Fate: Museum ship from 1979 - Estonian Maritime Museum, but still guarded by the Soviet Navy

Estonia
- Name: Lembit
- Operator: Estonian Maritime Museum
- Acquired: From the Soviet Navy, on 27 April 1992
- Recommissioned: (Honorary) "Estonian Navy vessel nr.1" as of 2 August 1994
- Decommissioned: 19 May 2011
- Home port: Tallinn
- Honours and awards: Estonian Navy vessel nr.1 (1994)
- Fate: Pulled out of water on 21 May 2011, restored and now in a museum building.

General characteristics
- Class & type: Kalev-class submarine
- Tonnage: 570 (in its current condition)
- Displacement: 665 tons surfaced; 853 tons submerged
- Length: 59.5 m (195 ft 3 in)
- Beam: 7.5 m (25 ft) 7.5 m (24 ft 7 in)
- Draught: 3.6 m (12 ft) 3.6 m (11 ft 10 in)
- Propulsion: two diesel Vickers and Armstrongs Ltd. (600 hp (450 kW; 610 PS) each); two Metropolitan-Vickers electric motors (395 hp (295 kW; 400 PS) each)
- Speed: surfaced - 13.5 kn (15.5 mph; 25.0 km/h); submerged - 8.5 kn (9.8 mph; 15.7 km/h)
- Test depth: 120 m (390 ft)
- Complement: 4 officers + 28 sailors (Estonian Navy); 7 officers + 31 sailors (Soviet Navy)
- Armament: 4 × 21-inch (533 mm) torpedo tubes; (bow, 8 torpedoes); 1 × 40 mm Bofors AA gun; 1 × 7.7 mm Lewis AA machine gun; 24 mines

EML Lembit is one of two Kalev-class mine-laying submarines built for the Republic of Estonia before World War II, and is now a museum ship in Tallinn. She was launched in 1936 at Vickers-Armstrongs, Barrow-in-Furness, and served in the Estonian Navy and the Soviet Navy. Until she was hauled out on 21 May 2011, Lembit was the oldest submarine still afloat in the world. Her sister ship, Kalev, was sunk in October 1941. Lembit is named for Lembitu, an Estonian ruler who resisted the Livonian Crusades.

== History ==
Lembit is the only surviving warship of the pre-war Estonian Navy and in the Baltic countries. Estonia is a maritime nation, and like every country with a long coastline to defend, it has to safeguard its territorial waters. With regard to experience gained and observed during World War I, submarines found their proper application in the pre–World War II Estonian Navy. The collection organised by the Submarine Fleet Foundation in May 1933 developed into one of the most successful undertakings among similar fundraising events nationwide.

In the course of building and testing the two submarines, the Estonian crews received training in Great Britain between 1935 and 1937. Throughout 1937–1940, Lembit and her sister ship Kalev were the most imposing vessels in the Estonian Navy. Their inactivity in the occupation of Estonia by the Soviet Union was a political decision.

Lembit was christened by Alice, the wife of August Schmidt, Estonia's ambassador to United Kingdom, saying: "I name you 'Lembit'. May your service be happy and successful. May God bless all who serve aboard you."

=== World War II ===
In Spring 1937, Lembit joined the Estonian Navy, where she operated until the Soviet occupation in mid-1940. The submarine carried out one training torpedo attack in her three years of service in the Estonian Navy, but was never used in the minelaying role.

The submarine was formally taken over by the Soviet Navy on 18 September 1940, by which time only five men of the submarine's Estonian crew remained on board. They were needed to assist the Soviet crew in learning unfamiliar machinery.

After the German invasion of the Soviet Union in June 1941, Lembit was commissioned into the Soviet Baltic Fleet. The original name Lembit was initially retained. At least three of her original Estonian crew helped to operate the submarine during the war. Lembit participated with the Soviet Baltic Fleet in military operations. Lembit carried out a total of seven patrols during the German-Soviet war.

=== Patrols ===
==== 1941 ====
- War patrol 10–21 August. She laid twenty mines near Cape Arcona. Some ships which were damaged in November 1941, due to British and German mines, were described in Soviet literature as Lembit 'successes'.
- War patrol 19–26 October.
- 4–5 November. In battle conditions and through a broken icefield, transferred from Kronstadt to Leningrad.

==== 1942 ====
- War patrol 17 August - 22 September. On 13 September, Lembit was ordered to return to base. Her commander decided to stay in position for one more day to charge batteries. On 14 September, she attacked a convoy and badly damaged the transport ship Finnland (5,281 GRT), which sank on 15 September, at 59°36'8 N/21°14'5 E (the ship was subsequently raised and re-commissioned on 1 July 1943). During a counterattack which involved the dropping of some fifty depth charges, the submarine sustained serious damage, including a fire in the second group of batteries; six men were wounded. After some repairs Lembit returned to base. This episode earned her the nickname "Immortal submarine".

==== 1944 ====
- Awarded the Order of the Red Banner, 6 March.
- War patrol 2–18 October. Laid twenty mines. Destroyed the Danish merchant ship Hilma Lau (2,414 GRT) on 13 October.
- War patrol 24 November - 15 December.

==== 1945 ====
- War patrol 23 March - 14 April.

Ships sunk by Lembit
Date	Ship	Flag	Tonnage	Notes
14 September 1942	Finnland	(Nazi Germany)	5,281 GRT	merchant (torpedo, later salvaged)
13 October 1944	Hilma Lau	(Nazi Germany)	2,414 GRT	merchant (torpedo)
15 October 1944	M 3619 / Crabeels	(Nazi Germany)	150 GRT	auxiliary minesweeper (mine)
23 October 1944	Pionier 5	(Nazi Germany)	?	harbour tug (mine, most likely)
24 November 1944	Spreeufer	(Nazi Germany)	216 GRT	fishing vessel (mine)
13 February 1945	M 421	(Nazi Germany)	543 GRT	minesweeper (mine)
25 April 1945	Vs 343	(Nazi Germany)	?	auxiliary patrol vessel (mine)
Total:			8,604 GRT	

Also on Lembit's mines was damaged on 24 November 1944 the German auxiliary patrol vessel V 305 / Halbertstadt.

=== After World War II ===
On 18 June 1946, Lembit was renamed to U-1, to S-85 on 9 June 1949, to STZh-24 on 30 January 1956 and to UTS-29 on 27 December 1956. Some time between 1949 and 1956 she possibly carried the designation PZM-1 (PTsM-1?) for some time. The original name was probably restored when she was decommissioned and returned to Tallinn as a museum ship in 1979.

Lembit was presented with the Order of The Red Banner on 6 March 1945 for her victories earlier in the German-Soviet war. She was withdrawn from active duty on 17 January 1946 and become a training boat. On 12 January 1949 Lembit was included among medium submarines. She was stricken (disarmed) on 10 June 1955. She was transferred to the Krasnoye Sormovo shipyard on 3 August 1957 and subsequently towed to Gorky (now Nizhni Novgorod). Here Lembit was preserved as an experimental boat and an example of British submarine design. Her hatch for the pressure-tight anti-aircraft gun storage shaft was of particular interest. It was copied into designs for the missile hatches of new Soviet submarines.

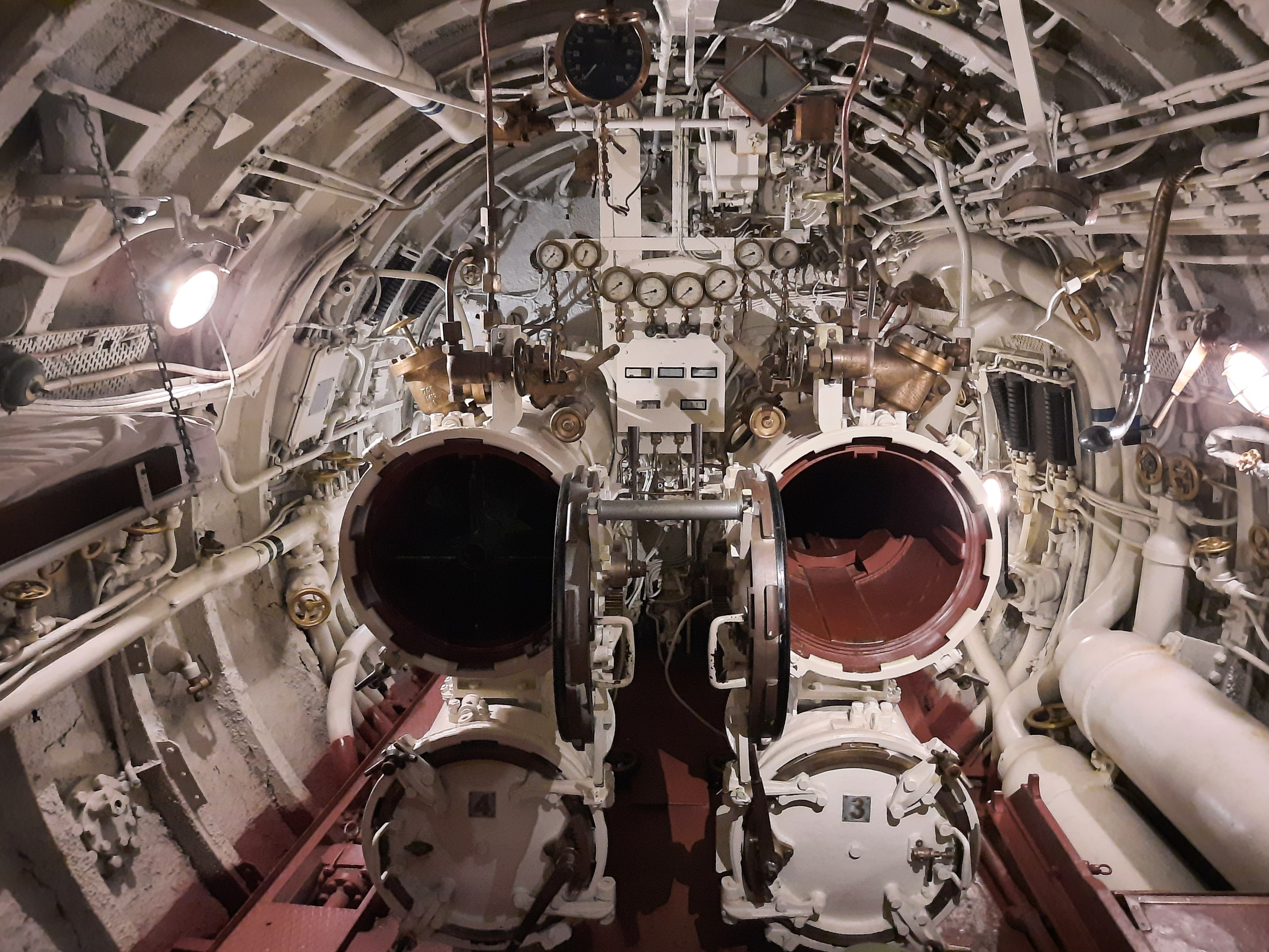
The torpedo room of Lembit (2022)

On 28 August 1979 exactly 38 years after she had left Tallinn, Lembit returned – under tow. After a lengthy overhaul, the submarine was opened to the public as a war memorial, (more precisely, as a branch of the Museum of the Soviet Baltic Fleet), on 5 May 1985. She, along with other artifacts, was used to celebrate the 40th anniversary of the victory over Nazi Germany. Lembit was one of three submarine war memorials in the USSR in 1987, along with S-56 in the Far East, and K-21 in the Far North. There had been plans for displaying all three vessels out of the water, but a floating crane which was to have been used, (which had been moved from Kronstadt), lost its boom during the tow.

=== After regaining independence ===
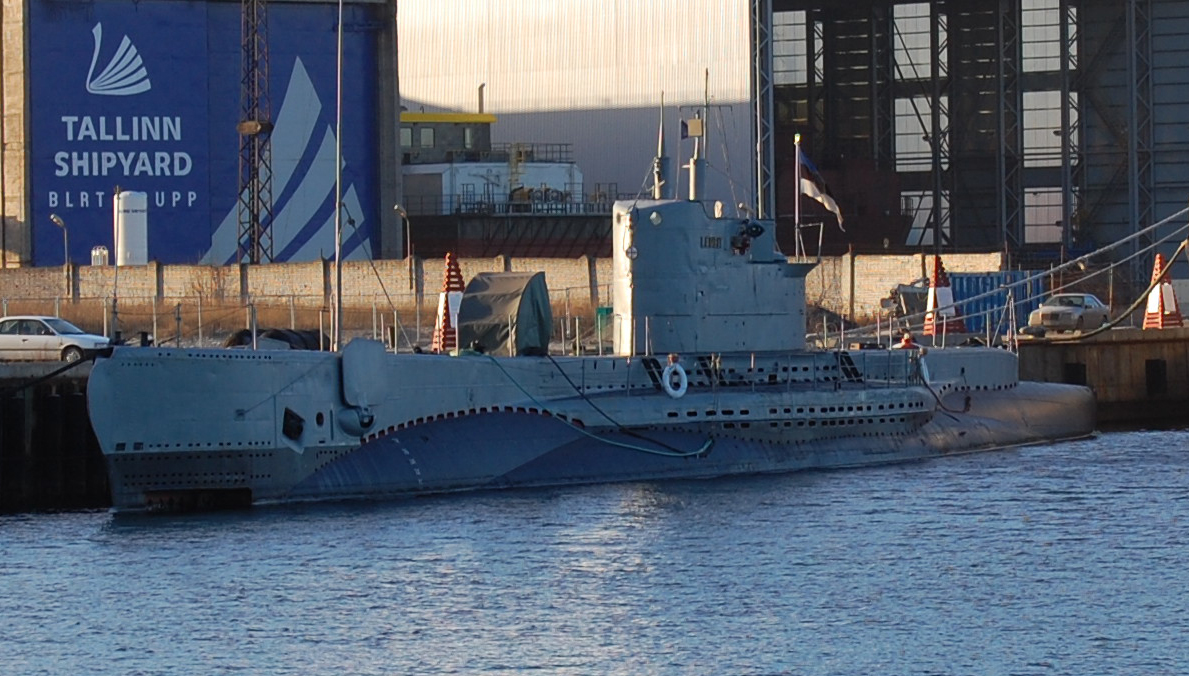
Lembit in Tallinn as part of a museum display (2008)

After the collapse of the USSR in 1991 and the subsequent dissolution of its navy, the submarine was taken over by Estonian officials on 27 April 1992 – a few Defence League men hoisted an Estonian flag on the vessel, meeting no resistance.

Lembit is one of two surviving pre-war Estonian warships; the other is the small gunboat Uku on Lake Peipsi, which is a wreck. Lembit received the honorary nomination of 'vessel No. 1' in the new Estonian Navy on 2 August 1994. After a long and expensive restoration, the submarine was opened to the public, as a department of the Estonian Maritime Museum, with a collection of other naval weapons. Lembit is one of the few surviving pre–World War II submarines (among others are the Finnish Vesikko, built in 1933, and Soviet K-21, built in 1937).

== Preservation ==
In late 2002 Lembit caught fire. One person was killed in the blaze, but nothing of historic value was lost. The inside was filled with flammable wood and rubber. Nobody knew how or why it caught fire but through 2003 it was not viewable by the public. The original design drawings were discovered in a Cumbrian archive in 2010. They were scanned and sent to Estonia. A total of over 200 drawings were sent, so that they could be used for restoration. The Estonian Maritime Museum developed plans to place the vessel into the museum building (Lennusadam) in 2008. Lembit was pulled out of the water on 21 May 2011, using another exhibit at the same museum - BTS-4 (an armoured recovery vehicle, based on the T-54 tank). The winching was done on a 100 m (330 ft) ramp.

The submarine was missing its external torpedo tube covers. They used one original, that was stored somewhere else and the drawings (obtained from England), to construct three replicas. Most of the external paint was also removed, for minor de-rusting and the removal of some small dents. It was anticipated that the total restoration, would cost over 360,000 Euros. The submarine was "parked" next to the Lennusadam building, until the night of 6/7 July 2011, when they began to tow it into the Lennusadam. The towing was done the same way as when it was pulled out of water and it took until 10 July. The Lennusadam opened to visitors in May 2012, with Lembit now undercover for visitors to explore, both inside and out.
