= SS Kenton =

A number of steamships have been named Kenton.

- SS Kenton (1913), a British cargo ship torpedoed and sunk in 1941
- SS Kenton (1921), a British cargo ship in service 1947–50
