= Kalev-class submarine =

Submarine class

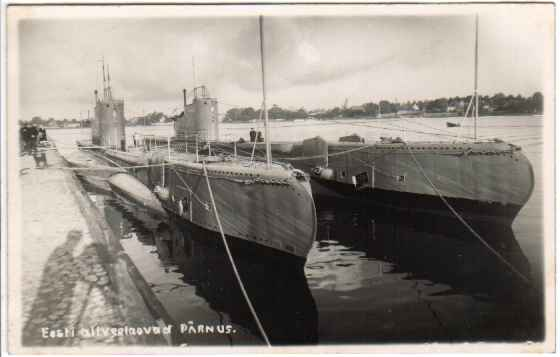
- Kalev and Lembit

Class overview
- Name: Kalev class
- Builders: Vickers Armstrongs
- Operators: Estonian Navy; Soviet Navy
- In commission: 1936 - 1979
- Completed: 2
- Lost: 1
- Preserved: 1

General characteristics
- Type: Submarine
- Tonnage: 570 (in its current condition)
- Displacement: 665 tons surfaced; 853 tons submerged
- Length: 59.5 m (195 ft 3 in)
- Beam: 7.5 m (24 ft 7 in)
- Draught: 3.6 m (11 ft 10 in)
- Speed: surface - 13.5 knots (25.0 km/h; 15.5 mph); submerged - 8.5 knots (15.7 km/h; 9.8 mph)
- Complement: 4 officers + 28 enlisted
- Armament: 4 × bow torpedo tubes; (8 21 inch (533 mm)torpedoes); 1 × 40 mm (1.6 in) Bofors AA gun; 1 × .303 in (7.7 mm) Lewis AA gun; 20 mines

The Kalev class consisted of two mine laying submarines built for the Estonian Navy.

== Development history ==
Shadowgraph of Kalev-class submarine

The newly independent Republic of Estonia followed the Finnish naval armament program and the common top secret defence cooperation in acquiring submarines. Unlike the German-designed Finnish subs, Estonia opted for British-built submarines. Both boats of the class, Kalev and Lembit, were built by Vickers-Armstrongs at Barrow-in-Furness, in the United Kingdom.

== Service history ==
The two subs were ordered in 1934 and delivered in 1937. After the Soviet annexation of Estonia in 1940 the Estonian Navy was integrated into the Soviet Baltic Fleet. The Kalev-class submarines were commissioned into the Soviet Navy on September 18, 1940. Kalev was sunk outside Hanko, Finland in 1941, but Lembit continued a successful campaign against Swedish iron ore transports to Germany. Lembit was decommissioned in 1979. She is now preserved as a museum ship at the Estonian Maritime Museum Lennusadam (Seaplane harbour/Hydroplane port), Tallinn.

== See also ==
- Estonian Navy
- Finnish–Estonian defense cooperation
- EML Kalev (1936)
- ENS Lembit
