= Urmas Dresen =

Estonian historian

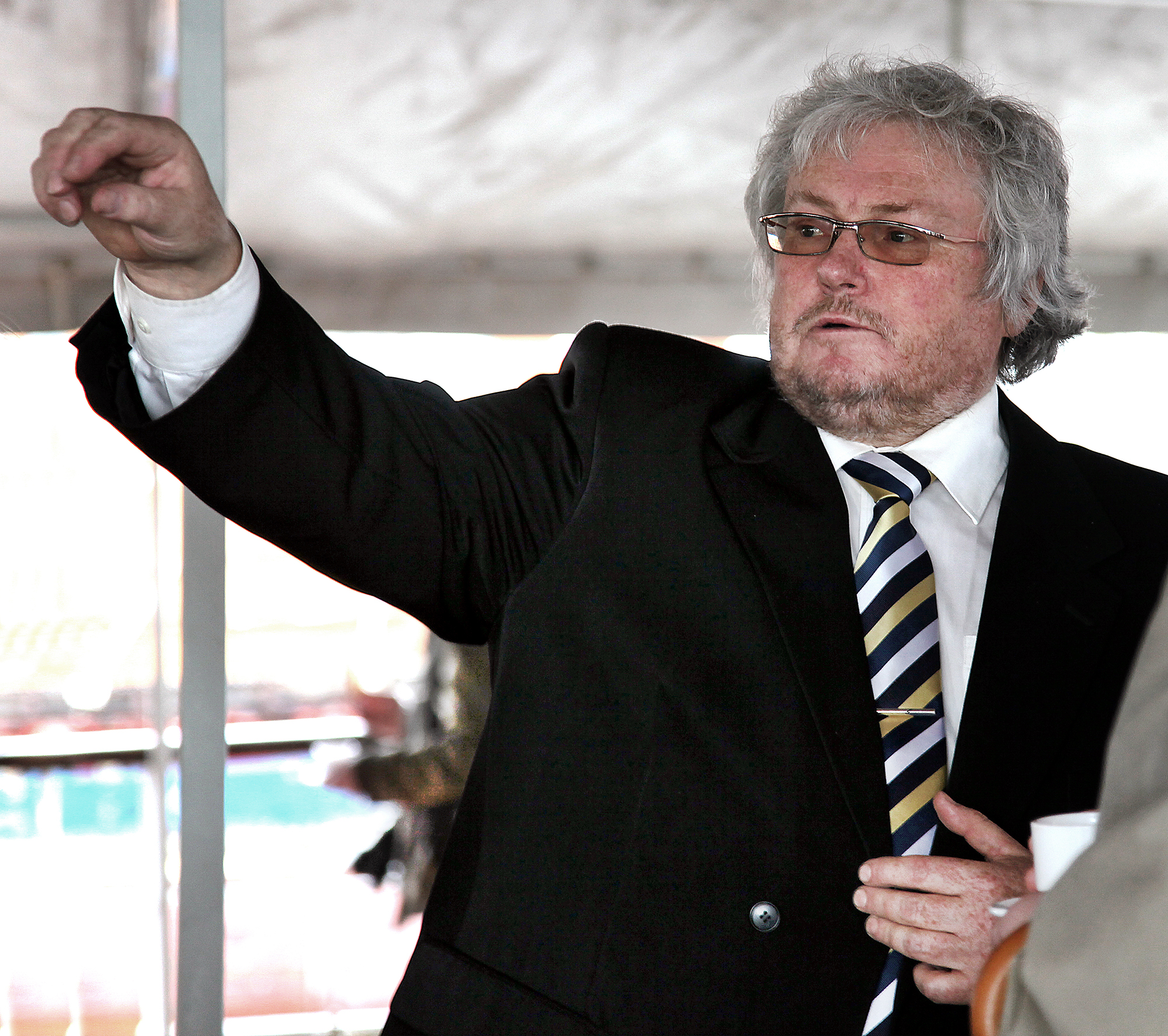
Urmas Dresen (2011)

Urmas Dresen (born in 1958) is an Estonian historian.

Since 1998 he is the head of Estonian Maritime Museum.

In 2013, he was awarded with Order of the White Star, IV class.
