= Kenton (given name) =

Kenton is the name of:

- Kenton Allen (born 1965), British television producer
- Kenton Clarke (born 1951), American entrepreneur and musician
- Kenton Coe (1930–2021), American composer
- Kenton Cool (born 1973), English mountaineer
- Kenton Couse (1721–1790), English architect
- Kenton Duty (born 1995), American actor and singer
- Kenton Edelin (1962–2022), American basketball player and attorney
- Kenton Forsythe (1944–2023), American engineer and professional audio pioneer
- Kenton Grua (1950–2002), American river guide
- Kenton Harper (1801–1867), American politician
- Kenton Jernigan, American squash player
- Kenton Keith (born 1980), American football player
- Kenton Koch (born 1994), American racing driver
- Kenton Onstad (born 1953), American politician
- Kenton Patzkowsky, American politician
- Kenton Richardson (born 1999), English football player
- Kenton Smith (born 1979), Canadian ice hockey player
- Kenton W. Keith (born 1939), American diplomat
