= EML Kalev (1936) =

1936 Estonian ship

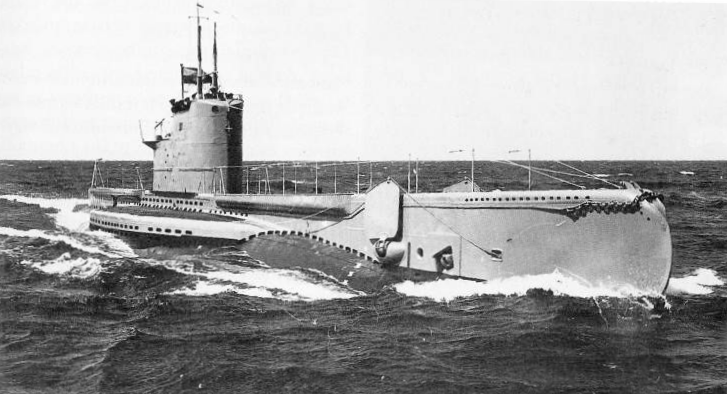
- EML Kalev

History

Estonia
- Name: Kalev
- Operator: Estonian Navy
- Ordered: 12 December 1934
- Builder: Vickers and Armstrongs Ltd., United Kingdom
- Laid down: May 1935
- Launched: 7 July 1936 13:20
- Commissioned: 12 March 1937
- In service: 1937–1940
- Out of service: 1940
- Home port: Tallinn
- Motto: "Julgelt - Kindlalt - Rahulikult" ("Boldly - Firmly - Calmly")
- Nickname(s): Kalev
- Captured: by USSR in 1940

Soviet Union
- Name: Kalev
- Operator: Soviet Navy
- In service: 1940 - 1941
- Out of service: 1941
- Home port: Tallinn, Leningrad
- Captured: from Estonia in 1940
- Fate: Missing after 29 October 1941

General characteristics
- Class & type: Kalev-class submarine
- Displacement: 665 tons surfaced; 853 tons submerged
- Length: 59.5 m (195 ft 3 in)
- Beam: 7.5 m (25 ft) 7.5 m (24 ft 7 in)
- Draught: 3.6 m (12 ft) 3.6 m (11 ft 10 in)
- Propulsion: two diesel Vickers and Armstrongs Ltd. (1,200 hp (890 kW; 1,200 PS)); two Metropolitan-Vickers electric motors (790 hp (590 kW; 800 PS))
- Speed: surfaced - 13.5 kn (15.5 mph; 25.0 km/h); submerged - 8.5 kn (9.8 mph; 15.7 km/h)
- Test depth: 120 m (390 ft)
- Complement: 4 officers + 28 sailors
- Armament: 4 × 21 inch (533 mm) torpedo tubes; (bow, 8 torpedoes); 1 × 40 mm Bofors AA gun; 1 × 7.7 mm Lewis AA machine gun; 24 mines

EML Kalev was one of two submarines of the Republic of Estonia launched in 1936 at Vickers and Armstrongs Ltd. in England. Her sister, Lembit, survived the Second World War.

== History ==
Kalev was a second pre-war Estonian Navy submarine. Estonia is a maritime nation and, like every country with a long coastline, had to defend its territorial waters. Based on the experiences of World War I, the submarines found their proper application in the pre-Second World War Estonian Navy. The collection organised by the Submarine Fleet Foundation in May 1933 developed into one of the most successful undertakings among similar events nationwide.

In the course of building and testing two submarines, the Estonian crews got a top-level naval training at the time in England in 1935–1937. In the period of 1937–1940 the submarines Lembit and Kalev were the most imposing naval vessels of the Estonian Navy. Their non-interference upon the annexation of Estonia by the USSR was a political decision made irrespective of the will of the navy.

== Kalev in World War II ==
The submarine Kalev joined the Estonian Navy in spring 1937, where she operated until the Soviet takeover in 1940. (On 24 February 1940, The Third Reich had expressed its interest in obtaining the submarine, if Estonia would sell it, but this offer was turned down.)

=== Service in the Soviet Navy ===
The submarine was formally taken over by the Soviet Navy on 18 September 1940, by which time only five men of the submarine crew remained in place to instruct the new Soviet crews. After the outbreak of the German-Russian war in June 1941, Kalev was re-complemented, having a totally Russian-speaking crew, although the original name Kalev was retained. During the Second World War Kalev participated in military operations as part of the Soviet Baltic Fleet. Kalev did not return from her second patrol and was reported as missing since 29 October 1941.

== Possible wreck ==
Kalev's ultimate fate or the location of the wreck was unknown for a long time. It was generally assumed that she hit a mine and sunk off Keri in the Gulf of Finland between Tallinn and Helsinki, but she could have been anywhere between Kronstadt and Hanko; some sources suggested she was scuttled in the Tallinn Bay during the Soviet evacuation on 28 August 1941.

In June 2010, an Estonian Maritime Museum research team concentrated their efforts on finding Kalev. It was assumed that Kalev hit a mine and sank in a minefield laid off Cape Juminda. On 30 June 2010 a wreck of what appeared to be a submarine was found five miles north of Cape Juminda, Northern Estonia by the Estonian Maritime Museum research vessel Mare. According to marine archeologist Vello Mäss, the specific shape of shafts for laying mines on the submarine-shaped object seen on the sonar screen gave rise to hopes indicating a probability of about 95% that the wreck found was the Kalev. However, further research had to be done to conclusively confirm the finding.

Later it was discovered that despite the wreck looking like a submarine, it turned out to be an old aerostat. Kalev is still missing.
