= Frank Kendon =

English writer and poet (1893–1959)

Frank Samuel Herbert Kendon (12 September 1893 – 28 December 1959) was an English writer, poet and academic. He was also an illustrator, and journalist. A campaigning pacifist at the beginning of the 2nd World War, he had served in the 1st and termed himself a conscientious objector thereafter.

== Life ==
He was the son of Samuel Kendon, a schoolmaster at Bethany School, Goudhurst; the educator Olive Kendon was his sister. He matriculated in 1921 at St John's College, Cambridge, where he became a Fellow in 1948.

Kendon was a published poet in the 1920s and later a writer of stories and a novel. From 1935 to 1954 he worked for Cambridge University Press. At the beginning of World War II he was a campaigning pacifist. After the war, he undertook the translations of the Psalms in the New English Bible, but died before he could complete the work. Timothy d'Arch Smith argued tentatively for Kendon's inclusion in the canon of Uranian poets in view of a poem, in Poems and Sonnets, singing the praises of naked bathing boys – a Uranian staple.

== Works ==
- Poems by Four Authors (1923) with J. R. Ackerley, A. Y. Campbell, and Edward Davison
- Poems and Sonnets (London, 1924)
- Mural paintings in English churches during the Middle Ages: an introductory essay on the folk influence in religious art (Bodley Head 1923)
- Arguments & Emblems (1925)
- A Life and Death of Judas Iscariot (Bodley Head 1926))
- The Small Years (1930) autobiography
- The Adventure of Poetry (1932)
- Tristram (1934) poem
- The Cherry Minder (1935) poems
- The Flawless Stone (1942) poem
- The Time Piece (1945) poem
- Each Silver Fly
- The Farmers Friend
- Cage & Wing (1947) poem
- Martin Makesure (1950) novel
- Jacob & Thomas: Darkness (1950)
- Thirty Six Psalms, an English Version, Cambridge University Press, 1963

== Family ==
Kendon had four children with his wife, Elizabeth Cecilia Phyllis Horne, a school teacher. The children were in order of birth; Alice (nee Kendon, then Stephens then Thomas) a prolific linguist, Adam Kendon, Andrew a talented musician and artist, and Thomas (known as Adrian) who is the last surviving of the Kendon siblings, also a talented musician.
