= USCGC Bittersweet =

1943 ship

Coordinates: 59.453151°N 24.735871°E

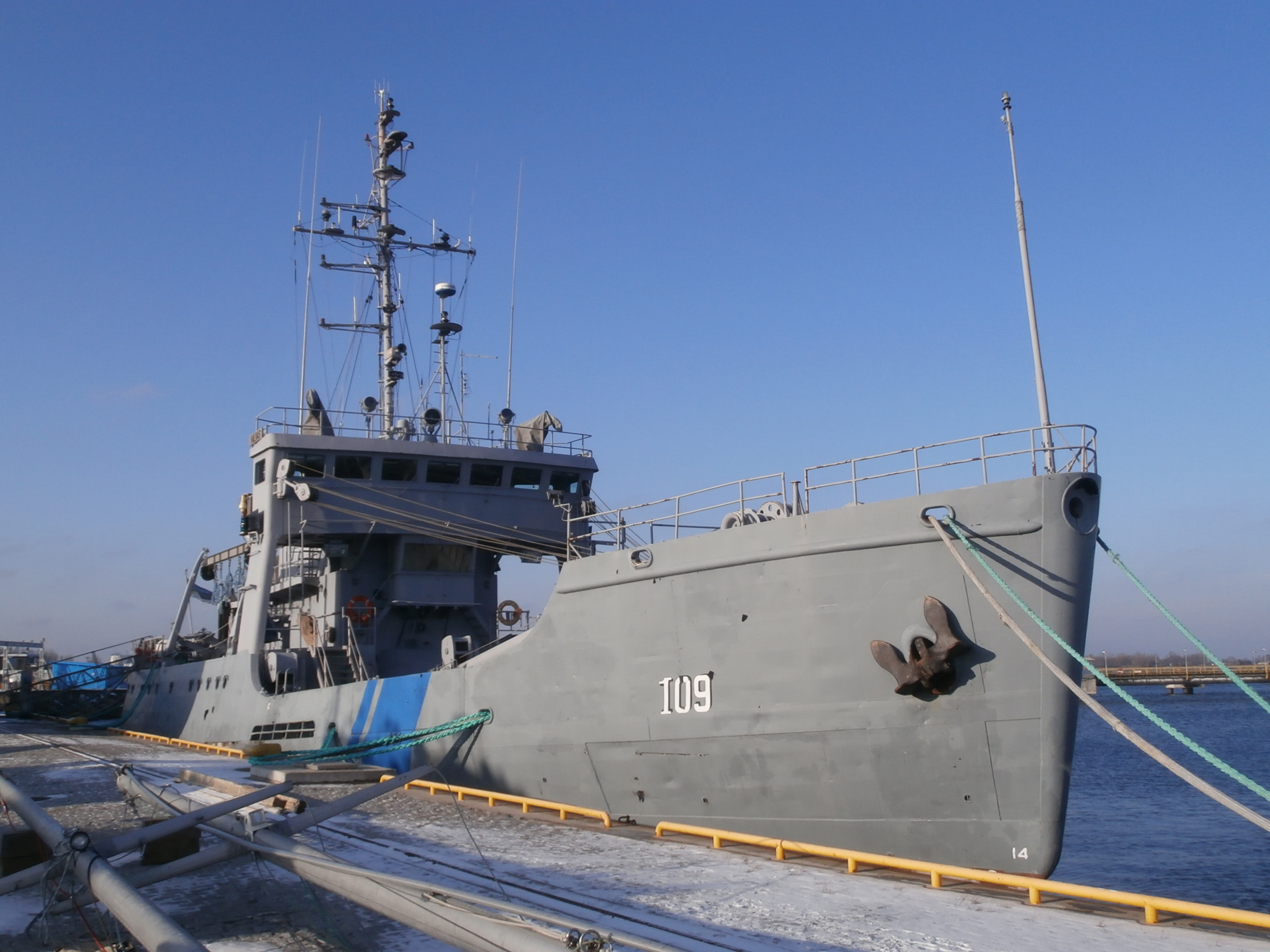
- Bittersweet in Estonian service as Valvas.

History

United States
- Name: Bittersweet
- Builder: Zenith Dredge Company, Duluth, Minnesota
- Cost: $926,769
- Laid down: 16 September 1943
- Launched: 11 November 1943
- Commissioned: 11 May 1944
- Decommissioned: 18 August 1997
- Reclassified: WAGL-389 to WLB-389, 1965
- Identification: Call sign: NODH
- Fate: Transferred to Estonia, 5 September 1997

Estonia
- Name: Valvas
- Operator: Estonian Border Guard
- Acquired: 5 September 1997
- Decommissioned: 11 July 2014
- Identification: IMO number: 6117581; Hull number: PVL-109
- Status: Undergoing preservation to be a museum ship

General characteristics
- Class & type: Iris-class buoy tender
- Displacement: 1945 : 935 long tons (950 t) full load; 1966 : 700 long tons (711 t) light; 1,026 long tons (1,042 t) full load
- Length: 180 ft (55 m) o/a; 170 ft (52 m) p/p
- Beam: 37 ft 1 in (11.30 m)
- Draft: 1945 : 12 ft (3.7 m); 1966 : 14 ft 7 in (4.45 m)
- Propulsion: Diesel-electric; 2 × Cooper Bessemer-type GND-8, 4-cycle diesel engines; 2 × Westinghouse generators; 1 × electric motor; 1 × screw
- Speed: Maximum : 1945 : 13 knots (24 km/h; 15 mph); 1966 : 11.9 knots (22.0 km/h; 13.7 mph); Economic : 1945 : 8.3 knots (15.4 km/h; 9.6 mph); 1966 : 8.5 knots (15.7 km/h; 9.8 mph)
- Range: 12,000 nmi (22,000 km) at 12 kn (22 km/h; 14 mph); 17,000 nmi (31,000 km) at 8.3 kn (15.4 km/h; 9.6 mph)
- Complement: 1945 : 6 officers, 74 enlisted; 1962 : 3 officers, 2 warrants, 42 enlisted
- Sensors & processing systems: 1945 : SL-1 radar; WEA sonar
- Armament: 1 × 3"/50 caliber gun; 2 × 20 mm guns; 2 × Mousetrap anti-submarine rocket launchers; 2 × Depth charge tracks; 4 × Y-gun depth charge projectors (1945)

USCGC Bittersweet (WLB 389) was a C or Iris-class 180-foot buoy tender of the United States Coast Guard.

Built by the Zenith Dredge Company of Duluth, Minnesota, the ship was laid down on 16 September 1943 and launched on 11 November 1943.

== Career ==
Following her commissioning on 11 May 1944, Bittersweet was based at Kodiak, Alaska. There she carried out numerous search and rescue operations, fought fires, delivered medical supplies, and enforced fishing laws. On the January 15, 1945 she departed to assist the Navy patrol craft YP-73 which had been reported aground near the Hanin Rocks. Upon arriving Bittersweet found YP-73 breaking up on a reef. Six crewmembers were rescued and transported to Kodiak. Bittersweet returned to the wreckage and recovered the bodies of nine missing sailors.

In late 1976 Bittersweet was transferred to Woods Hole, Massachusetts and used for aids to navigation (ATON) operations and icebreaking. In addition, she took part in oil spill cleanup operations following the grounding of the tanker Argo Merchant, and also participated in the International Ice Patrol.

Bittersweet was decommissioned on 18 August 1997 and transferred to Estonia. Renamed Valvas, the ship served in the Estonian Border Guard until it was decommissioned in July 2014 and given to the Estonian Maritime Museum. It is to become a museum ship.

== Design ==
The Iris-class buoy tenders were constructed after the Mesquite-class buoy tenders. Bittersweet cost $926,769 to construct and had an overall length of 180 feet (55 m). It had a beam of 37 feet (11 m) and a draft of up to 12 feet (3.7 m) at the time of construction, although this was increased to 14 feet 7 inches (4.45 m) in 1966. It initially had a displacement of 935 long tons (950 t; 1,047 short tons); this was increased to 1,026 long tons (1,042 t; 1,149 short tons) in 1966. It was powered by one electric motor. This was connected up to two Westinghouse generators which were driven by two CooperBessemer GND-8 four-cycle diesel engines. It had a single screw.

The Iris-class buoy tenders had maximum sustained speeds of 13 knots (24 km/h; 15 mph), although this diminished to around 11.9 knots (22.0 km/h; 13.7 mph) in 1966. For economic and effective operation, it had to initially operate at 8.3 knots (15.4 km/h; 9.6 mph), although this increased to 8.5 knots (15.7 km/h; 9.8 mph) in 1966. The ship had a complement of six officers and seventy-four crew members in 1945; this decreased to two warrants, four officers, and forty-seven men in 1966. It was fitted with a SL1 radar system and QBE-3A sonar system in 1945. Its armament consisted of one 3"/50 caliber gun, two 20mm/80 guns, two Mousetraps, two depth charge tracks, and four Y-guns in 1945; these were removed in 1966.

== Legacy ==
A lifering from Bittersweet is on display at the Porthole Restaurant in Falmouth, Massachusetts.

== Awards ==
- American Campaign Medal
- Asiatic-Pacific Campaign Medal
- World War II Victory Medal
- National Defense Service Medal with star
