= Kenton (cigarette) =

Former German cigarette brand

- An old pack of Kenton cigarettes.
- Product type: Cigarette
- Produced by: Bulgartabac
- Country: East Germany
- Markets: East Germany, Soviet Union, Democratic Republic of Afghanistan

Kenton was a German brand of cigarettes, manufactured from East Germany.

== History ==
Kenton was available in the variants "Aromatic Blend" (Blue), "Menthol" (Green) and "American Blend", which was later renamed to "Extra Quality" (Red). The cigarettes had a filter and a length of 85 mm. In 1989 the retail sales price was 3.20 Deutsche Mark . The packaging was a white soft pack with similarly colored diagonal stripes. These cigarettes were produced in the 1980s by the Bulgarian company Bulgartabac in Blagoevgrad.

== See also ==
- Tobacco smoking
