= Olive Kendon =

Olive Miriam Kendon (1897–1977) was an English educator and social activist, founder of the Children's House Society. She is known as one of the pioneers of the experimental concept of children's communities. Leila Berg wrote in 1971 "I remember Olive Kendon beaming when someone in a conference coffee-bar happily described her as 'an elderly juvenile delinquent'."

== Early life ==
She was born 5 March 1897, the granddaughter of Joseph James Kendon (died 1903), a Baptist minister and founder of Bethany School, Goudhurst, in Kent. Her father Samuel Kendon (died 1945) taught there, becoming principal; Frank Kendon was her brother. She began teaching at the school in 1914, during the early days of World War I, when she was 17 years old. By 1915 the school was in pinched circumstances, with the male staff mostly having left, and shortages making an impact.

Theodore Maynard commented of the school that "The staff, with one or two exceptions, was entirely made up of members of the Kendon and Benians families". In her biographical memoir, Kendon mentions the school headmaster as "Mr. Benn", and his daughter who had taught her as "Miss Benn". William Alfred Benians had been appointed headmaster of the school, releasing Samuel Kendon's time for more pastoral work, in 1878. Olive Kendon from early experience of the type of evangelical missionary work that had brought her father to minister in Kent, from London, concluded that it was intrusive and to be avoided. She characterised her own approach in her early years of teaching in terms of "school-marm attitude" and "the era of teaching rather than educating".

At about age 28 Kendon left Bethany School, where she was still teaching under the headmaster P. S. Benians, for a year's study at Westhill Training College, one of the Selly Oak Colleges near Birmingham. There she made a long-term friendship with the Swiss journalist and writer, Betty Wehrli-Knobel, who describes Kendon in her 1984 memoir Wegstrecken as a language teacher, and unforgettable ("nie zu vergessende Freundin aus der College-Zeit").

== School head ==
Towards the end of the interwar period, Kendon had Froebel College training, again at Westhill Training College, Selly Oak. She was placed in the class of third-year teacher training students. She began to apply the methods she had learned there, first at Bethany School: "Miss Benn" had left the school, and Kendon took over the Junior School. She then taught in a small prep school. While the instruction was aimed at the teaching of primary school pupils, she adapted it to older pupils.

On the outbreak in 1939 of World War II, Kendon took up the headship of a prep school in an Oxfordshire hamlet, and lived in Witney. In 1940 the Ladies' College, Goudhurst—the girls' boarding school in Kent associated with Bethany School—moved in a wartime evacuation to the north Midlands, firstly to Charnes Hall, Eccleshall, Staffordshire. It was known as Goudhurst College, and later moved to the area of Nantwich, in Cheshire. Olive's aunt Lydia Elizabeth Kendon (died 1945), fourth daughter of Joseph James Kendon, was there.

== First period of activism ==
In 1941 Kendon heard of a chance to set up a primary-age school at Bramhall, adjacent to Stockport (then in Cheshire). She started to teach in the school, near Bramhall. It was during this period that the first of her Children's Houses was started, in the Hillgate area. In the wartime situation, a group of children in a working-class neighbourhood themselves renovated and decorated a run-down house, then using it for activities they chose themselves, with light adult supervision. In an account written by Kendon of the house, with shop premises, the children cleaning the shop floor found the linoleum had a black-and-white check pattern, and she told them "it's to be your house".

By 1947, a second children's house in the Manchester area had been opened, by K. T. Blamey who was a magistrate, at Chorlton-on-Medlock. It lasted for four years. Kendon in her autobiography explains that at this period she suffered a lengthy illness, which was followed by a longer period abroad to recover. She was unable to continue her activism at this time. While she was out of the country, the Stockport House survived a slum clearance in its original location, by a transfer to a converted fire station.

In 1956, Kendon was living in Tunbridge Wells, Kent. The Stockport Children's House & Youth Club marked its 21st anniversary in 1962, and at that period Kendon tried to set up a Children's House in her area, on land behind Paddock Wood Primary School, at which she had taught. This effort was unsuccessful. By this time, she had joined the Society of Friends. She formed a committee to forward her ideas around 1966.

== Children's House Society ==
Permission was granted for a Children's House for the Sherwood Park housing estate of Tunbridge Wells in 1967. Olive Kendon was interviewed on Woman's Hour, the BBC Radio 2 programme, on 28 May 1970, with Jocelyn Ryder-Smith, and spoke about the Children's House Society she had founded. The Society's primary aim was to create children's houses for play, for the age range 5 to 11 years. Mary Stapleton of School Without Walls, writing in 1972 in the journal The New Era of the New Education Fellowship, grouped Children's House as an innovative concept in the United Kingdom with Action Space of Mary and Ken Turner, and Junior Art and Science Centres (Don Pavey).

Filming directed by Fred Fawbert, for Chorley Training College, went on in 1972 of Olive Kendon at home in Curtisden Green, and at the Sherwood Park Children's House. In 1975/6 the College produced a film "A Place of Their Own" about the Children's House concept.

The Kent Children's House Society was a registered charity from 1973 to 2002. A recruiting advertisement of 1978 for the Society stated that there were five children's houses in the United Kingdom. A government grant was given to the Society in 1979–80.

== Death ==
Olive Kendon died in June 1977, leaving an autobiographical work with an incomplete final chapter, then edited by others including Lorna Ridgway. An address was given at a memorial service on 29 September by Henry Howard, Chairman of the Children's Society, at a memorial service in the chapel of Bethany School. He mentioned her time in a wheelchair as a child, and the fact that she required a special diet; her teaching methods as influenced by Montessori education; her skill as a story-teller. The school she founded at Bramhall had become a grammar school (later Bramhall High School). A Children's House had been opened in Brixton in 1973. She was a Quaker by choice.

== Works ==
- Because they asked (1979), autobiographical. London: Children's House Society
