= Kenton High School =

Kenton High School may refer to:

- Kenton School, Newcastle upon Tyne, England
- Kenton High School (Kenton, Ohio), U.S.

== See also ==
- Simon Kenton High School, Independence, Kentucky, U.S.
