= Kenton (surname) =

Kenton is a surname. Notable people with the surname include:

- Darren Kenton (born 1978), English footballer
- Erle C. Kenton (1896–1980), American film director
- Joseph Kenton (1921-2014), American politician from Missouri
- Lou Kenton (1908–2012), English proofreader and centenarian
- Rodrigo Kenton (born 1955), Costa Rican football coach
- Simon Kenton (1755–1836), American pioneer and soldier
- Stan Kenton (1911–1979), American jazz musician
