= Kenion =

Kenion is a surname. Notable people with the surname include:

- Ella Kenion (born 1969), English actress
- J. Graham Kenion (1871–1942), English sailor
