= Viv Kendon =

British physicist and academic

Vivien M. Kendon
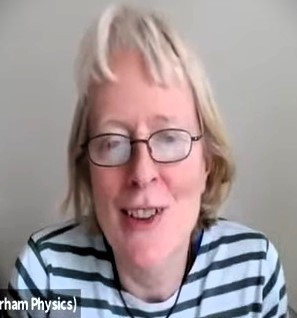
- Kendon in 2021
- Education: University of Edinburgh; University of Oxford
- Scientific career
- Workplaces: University of Strathclyde; Imperial College London
- Thesis: Finite Reynolds number effects in fluid mixtures : an investigation using numerical simulation methods (1999)

Vivien Mary Kendon is a British physicist who is Professor of Quantum Technology at the University of Strathclyde. Her research considers quantum computation and the properties of quantum walks. She is the director of the Computational Collaborative Project: Quantum Computing, which looks to develop useful applications of quantum computers.

== Early life and education ==
She lived on Station Road in Carlton. She gained 9 O-levels in 1974 at Carlton le Willows School, which was a grammar school until 1973.

Kendon was an undergraduate student at the University of Oxford. She moved to the University of Edinburgh for doctoral research, where she used numerical simulations to understand fluid dynamics. She then moved to the University of Strathclyde, where she shifted from soft condensed matter to quantum information theory. She joined Imperial College London in 2002, where she studied quantum walks on discrete lattices. Classical random walks underpin the design of classical algorithms, and it is believed that their quantum counterparts will support the implementation of efficient quantum algorithms. In 2004, she moved into industry to work in global electronic networking.

== Research and career ==
In 2014, Kendon joined Durham University as a member of the Quantum Light and Matter (QLM) research section and the Joint Quantum Centre. She held an EPSRC established career fellowship on Hybrid Quantum and Classical Computation from 2014 to 2019.

In 2020, Kendon launched the Computational Collaborative Project: Quantum Computing, which looks to develop the first useful applications of quantum computers. She moved to the University of Strathclyde in 2021.

== Selected publications ==
- Neil B. Lovett; Sally Cooper; Matthew Everitt; Matthew Trevers; Viv Kendon (2010). "Universal quantum computation using the discrete-time quantum walk". Physical Review A. 81 (4). arXiv:0910.1024. Bibcode:2010PhRvA..81d2330L. doi:10.1103/physreva.81.042330. Wikidata Q62270007.
- VIV KENDON (2007). "Decoherence in quantum walks – a review". Mathematical Structures in Computer Science. 17 (06). arXiv:quant-ph/0606016. doi:10.1017/s0960129507006354. Zbl 1130.81325. Wikidata Q62270030.
- W. Dür; R. Raussendorf; V. M. Kendon; H.-J. Briegel (2002). "Quantum walks in optical lattices". Physical Review A. 66 (5). arXiv:quant-ph/0207137. Bibcode:2002PhRvA..66e2319D. doi:10.1103/physreva.66.052319. Wikidata Q62381999.
