= Estonian Maritime Museum =

Museum in Tallinn, Estonia

- Eesti Meremuuseum

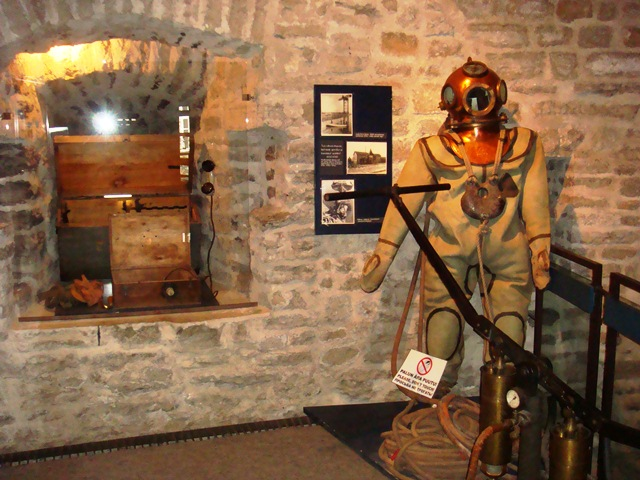
- Exposition of the Estonian Maritime Museum
- Established: 23 February 1935; 91 years ago
- Location: Pikk 70, Tallinn, Estonia
- Coordinates: 59.4424°N 24.7494°E
- Type: Maritime museum
- Collection size: 84,697
- Visitors: 403,400 (2014)
- Director: Urmas Dresen
- Public transit access: Linnahall, TLT
- Website: Official website

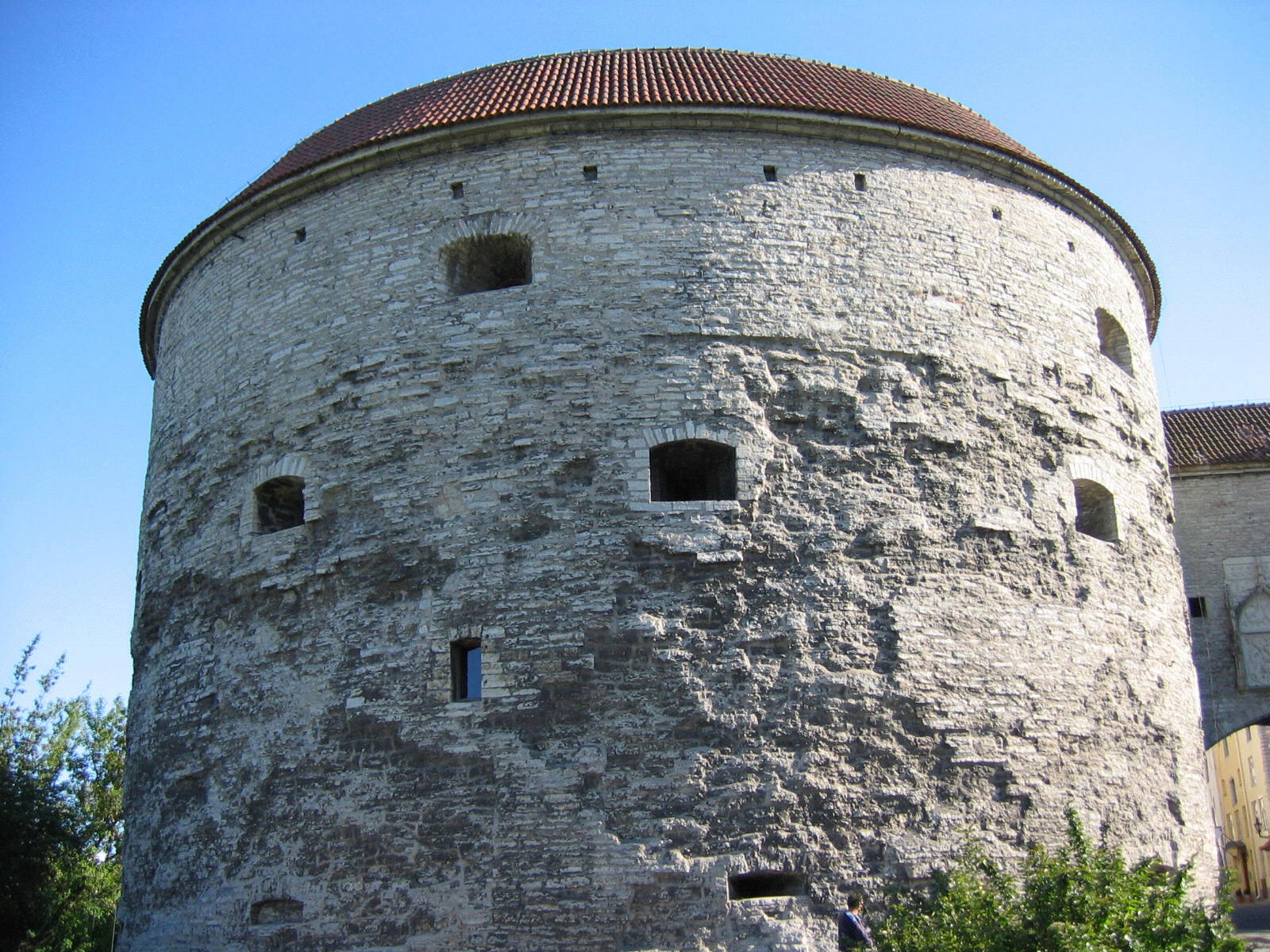
Fat Margaret tower

The Estonian Maritime Museum (Estonian: Eesti Meremuuseum) is located in the Fat Margaret tower in the old town of Tallinn. The museum presents the history of ships and navigation in Estonia and related to Estonia. Other parts of the Maritime Museum are the mine museum and the Seaplane Harbour museum where ships are presented. The museum claims to be one of the largest museums in Estonia and the most popular.

== History ==
The Museum was established in February 1935 by former captains and sailors. In November 1940, after the Soviet occupation of Estonia began, the museum was closed and its collection moved to the Kiek in de Kök tower. The original museum building was destroyed in the war.

After World War II, the museum's collection was distributed to Tallinn City Museum and other local museums. In 1961, the museum was reestablished. In 1977, as part of a restoration plan of the Old Town in preparation for the upcoming 1980 Olympic Games in Moscow, the museum was again closed and reopened in April 1981.

Since 1981, its main exhibition has been housed by the Fat Margaret tower. A second museum was opened in May 2012 in the Seaplane Harbor.

== Fat Margaret ==
Fat Margaret (Estonian: Paks Margareeta, also known in German as Dicke Margarethe) was built in the early 16th century (from 1511 to 1530) during the reconstruction of the medieval city gate system. The etymology of the tower's name derives from the fact that it was the largest part of the city's fortifications with walls measuring 25 meters in diameter, 20 meters in height and up to 5 meters thick. Apart from being a fortification against would-be invaders to the port of the town, it was also built to impress outside visitors arriving by sea.

== Exhibitions ==
Present exhibits include

- EML Lembit - A World War II Kalev-class submarine
- EML Grif - A Zhuk-class patrol boat
- EML Kalev (M414) - A Frauenlob-class minesweeper
- PVL 105 Torm - A Storm-class patrol boat used by the coastguard.
- PVL 106 Maru
- PVL 109 Valvas - An Iris-class patrol boat used by the coastguard, originally known as the USCGC Bittersweet
- EML Suurop (P421) - A R-class patrol boat
- Suur Tõll - a steamer-icebreaker built in 1914
- Research vessel Mare

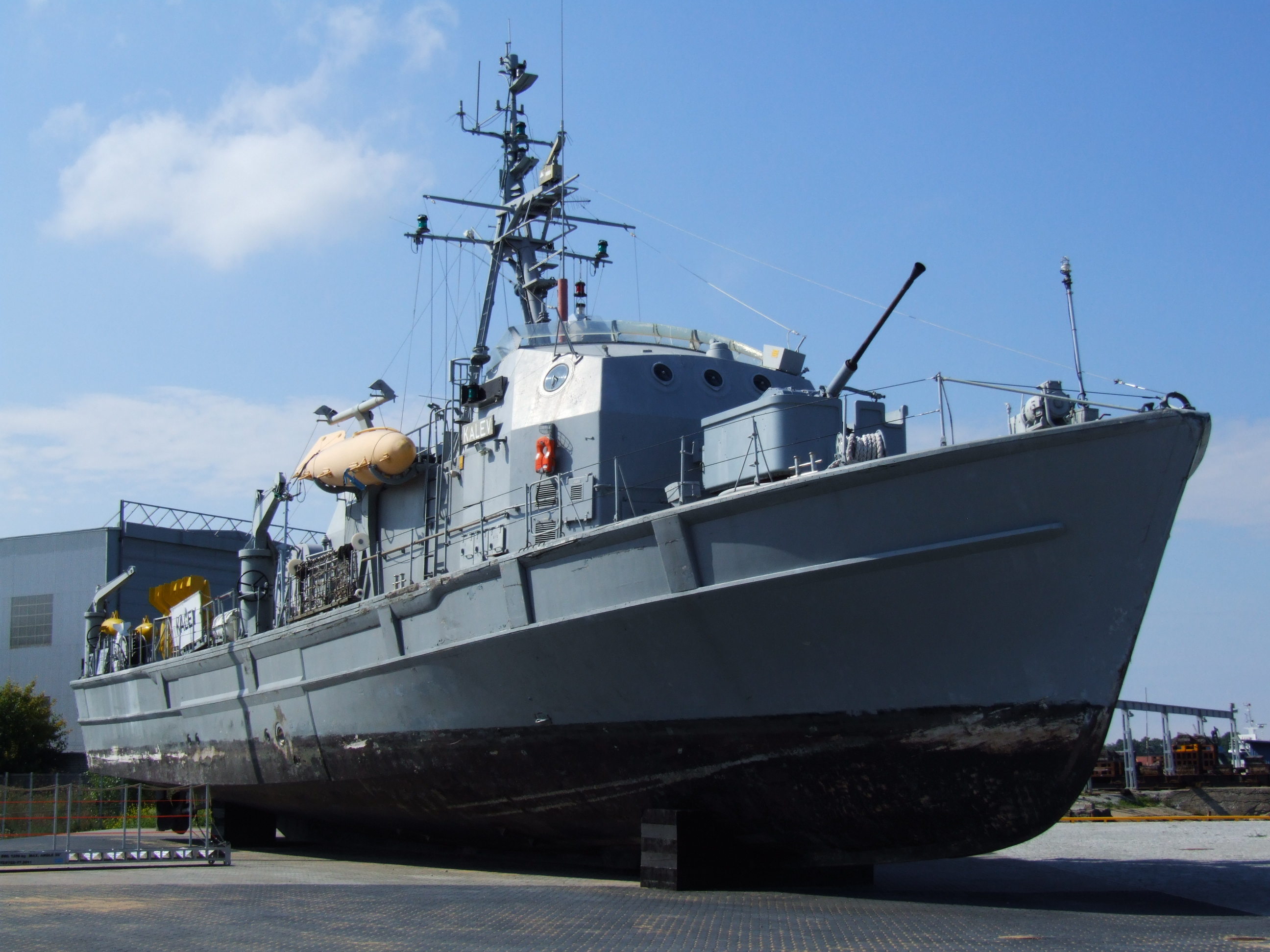
EML Kalev (M414)

== See also ==
- Estonian Navy
- EML Olev (M415)
- EML Vaindlo (M416)
