= Estonian Academy of Security Sciences =

Vocational university in Estonia

- Sisekaitseakadeemia
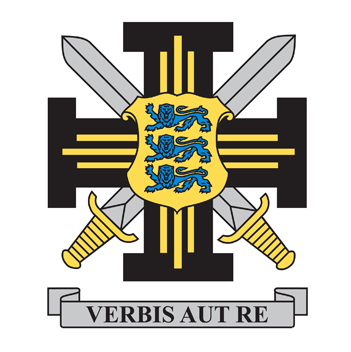
- Motto: Verbis aut Re
- Established: 15 April 1992; 34 years ago
- Founders: Government of Estonia
- Rector: Kuno Tammearu
- Location: Kase 61, 12012 Tallinn, Estonia; 59°27′19.53″N 24°50′36.06″E
- Website: Official website

Estonian Academy of Security Sciences (Estonian: Eesti Sisekaitseakadeemia) is a public vocational university in Estonia. It provides professional education for Estonian civil servants under the Estonian Ministry of the Interior. Its objective is to ensure a secure state and stable development, and to contribute to the security of the European Union. It was established on 15 April 1992 and is based in Tallinn. It has facilities in Pärnu County, Väike-Maarja Parish, Narva and Meriküla.

== History ==
The academy was founded on 15 April 1992, by the Estonian Government. Studies began on October 12. There were courses for police, investigation, customs, border guard and defence forces cadets. In 1993, the school was renamed the Estonian National Defence Academy. In 1999, teaching of defence force officers was transferred to the Estonian Military Academy. In 2004, Väike-Maarja Rescue School and Paikuse Police School were joined to the academy, and in 2006, Muraste Border Guard School also joined the academy. In 2010, due to the formation of the joint Police and Border Guard Board, the academy was reformed, combining the police college and border guard college. In addition, the Institute of Internal Security was formed. In 2015, migration studies were transferred to Tallinn University.

== Structure ==
The highest decision-making body of the academy is the council. The council consists of the rector, vice-rectors, directors, the head of the institute, and representatives of the academic staff, student body, and the Ministry of the Interior. The head of the council is the rector. There is also an Advisory Body, which makes proposals on the development of the academy to the rector, council and the Ministry of the Interior. The rector is also advised by the rectorate, which consists of vice-rectors and directors of colleges. The academy consists of colleges, institutes and centres. There are four colleges and one institute: Financial College, College of Justice, Police and Border Guard College, Rescue College, and Institute of Internal Security. Centres are led by vice-rectors. The Vice Rector of Academic Affairs governs the Language Centre, Centre for Continuing Education and Department of Affairs. The Vice Rector of Development governs the Department of IR and Development and the library. In addition, there are various administrative departments, like the Department of Administration, Financial Department, General Department, and Department of Communication.

== Notable faculty ==
- Urmas Reinsalu (born 1975), Estonian politician
- Hillar Aarelaid (born 1967), recognised civil servant

== See also ==
- List of universities in Estonia
- Police and Border Guard Board
- Estonian Rescue Board
- Estonian Internal Security Service
- IT and Development Centre. Ministry of the Interior, Estonia
