= EML Raju =

2018 Estonian ship

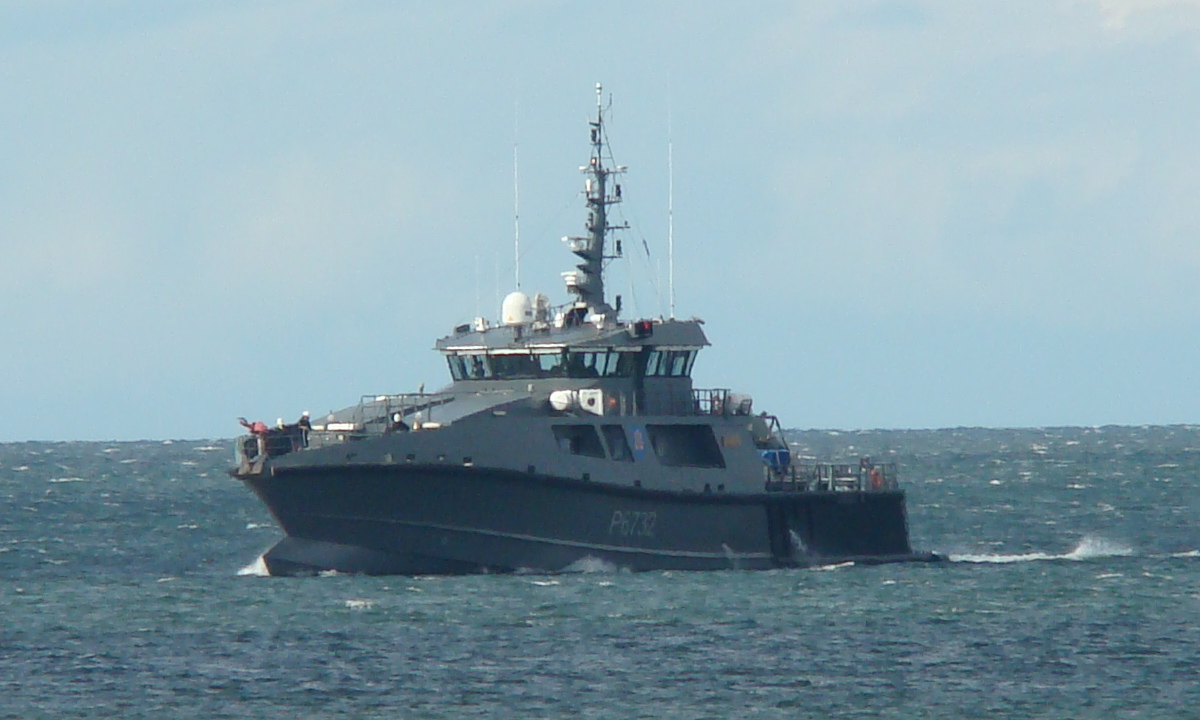
- Raju

History

Estonia
- Name: Raju (203)
- Operator: Police and Border Guard Board
- Ordered: 16 May 2016
- Builder: Baltic Workboats
- Laid down: 16 December 2016
- Sponsored by: Kersti Kaljulaid
- Christened: 16 August 2018
- Completed: 16 August 2018
- Acquired: 16 August 2018
- Commissioned: 16 August 2018
- Decommissioned: 2 January 2023
- Fate: Transferred to Estonian Navy

Estonia
- Name: EML Raju (P6732)
- Operator: Estonian Navy
- Commissioned: 3 January 2023
- Home port: Tallinn
- Status: In service

General characteristics
- Class & type: PATROL 45 WP HYBRID patrol vessel
- Displacement: 235 tons full
- Length: 44.6 m (146 ft 4 in)
- Beam: 8.8 m (28 ft 10 in)
- Draught: 2.6 m (8 ft 6 in)
- Propulsion: 2 x MTU 16V4000; 1 x Sleipner bow thruster
- Speed: 27 knots (50 km/h; 31 mph)
- Complement: 10
- Armament: 1X12.7 machine gun; 2X7.62 machine gun

EML Raju (P6732) is a PATROL 45 WP HYBRID-class patrol vessel. Built in 2018 by Baltic Workboats, it is the first battery-powered ship in the Estonian Navy. This is a multi-purpose patrol vessel with anti-pollution capabilities.

== History ==
=== Transfer to the Estonian Navy ===
On 3 January 2023, four larger ships of the Police and Border Guard Board were transferred to the Estonian Navy as part of the liquidation of the police fleet. This improved responsiveness in the Estonian maritime area and provided Estonia with a better defense capability.

=== 2025 Baltic Sea tanker confrontation ===
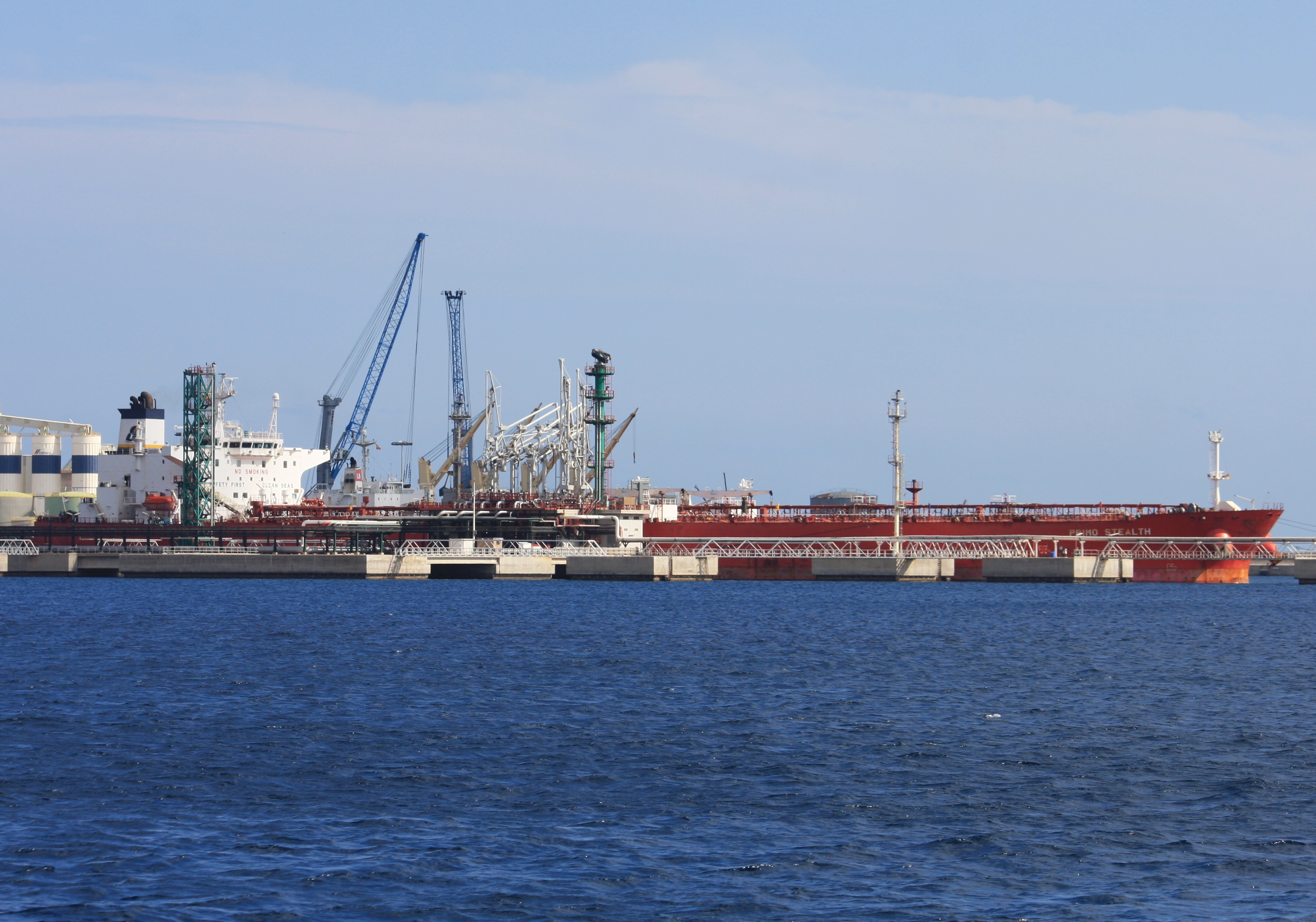
Oil Tanker Jaguar

In May 2025, the head of the European Commission, Ursula von der Leyen announced a package of anti-Russian sanctions that included sanctions on a number of tankers that transport Russian oil under the flags of convenience.

On May 13 EML Raju, supported by an Estonian Air Force M28 Skytruck aircraft and an Estonian Border Guard AW139 helicopter attempted to intercept the Indian owned, Gabonese registered oil tanker Jaguar. The ship had been transiting the Baltic Sea, bound for the Russian port of Primorsk. Estonian authorities requested to inspect the ship, citing its suspicious flag and insurance documentation, but the crew refused to comply.

After this message, Indian and Russian crew members could be heard on the bridge stating: "We are being met by a helicopter, they are demanding that we drop anchor". Following this, a Russian Air Force Su-35 scrambled to provide the ship with an escort. As a result of the arrival of the Russian aircraft, plans to board the ship were abandoned.

Afterwards, Estonian sources acknowledged that a Russian Air Force Sukhoi Su-35 fighter jet had entered Estonian airspace for a period of two minutes and flew towards the ship in response. As a result, a Portuguese Air Force F-16 was scrambled from Ämari Air Base to conduct reconnaissance on the Russian aircraft. Jaguar continued its transit through the Baltic Sea via Gogland, before arriving at Primorsk on the morning of 15 May 2025. The failed interception of the ship raised shortcomings with the operational capability of the Estonian Navy, with Jüri Saska stating that the services measures were constrained due to operating in international waters, as well as attempting a boarding action of a large vessel, for which Raju was not suitably equipped for.

=== 2026 damage ===
On 8 June 2026, Postimees reported that Raju had suffered damage to her propellers while being raised out of the water during scheduled maintenance in Pärnu. However, it was clarified that the hull of the ship was not damaged.

== See also ==
- List of active Estonian Navy ships
