= Ants Kurvits =

Estonian military officer (1887–1943)

- General Ants Kurvits
- Born: 14 May 1887
- Died: 27 December 1943 (aged 56)
- Military career
- Allegiance: Russian Empire; Estonia
- Branch: Imperial Russian Army; Estonian Army; Estonian Border Guard
- Service years: Russia: 1914–1917; Estonia: 1918–1939
- Rank: Major general
- Conflicts: World War I Estonian War of Independence
- Awards: See below

Ants Kurvits or Hans Kurvits (14 May 1887 – 27 December 1943) was an Estonian military commander, reaching rank of major general. He participated in the Estonian War of Independence and later became the founder and long-time leader of the Estonian Border Guard. Kurvits also served briefly as Minister of War.

== Early life ==
Ants Kurvits was born on 14 May 1887 in Mihkli-Aadu farm in Äksi, Tartu County, Estonia, then part of the Governorate of Livonia of the Russian Empire. He was the fifth child in the family. Kurvits received his early education in Hugo Treffner Gymnasium. After graduating in 1911, he went to the University of Tartu, where he studied law until the breakout of World War I in 1914.

== Career ==
Estonian Border Guard badge

On 1 November 1914, Kurvits joined the Imperial Russian Army. In 1915, after passing a short officer course in Vladimir Military School in St Petersburg, he was promoted to the rank of ensign. In the First World War he participated in fighting on the Polish front, becoming company commander by 1917. With the formation of Estonian national units, Kurvits was assigned to the 1st Estonian Infantry Regiment on 8 July 1917, first as company and later as battalion commander. In February 1918, he was promoted to the rank of lieutenant colonel.

On 16 November 1918, after the end of the Imperial German Occupation in Estonia, Kurvits became commander of the Estonian Defence League in Tartu County. On 25 December, he started forming the Viljandi Volunteer Battalion. On 5 February 1919, Kurvits was assigned to head the 2nd Infantry Regiment, which he led during fighting on the Petseri front. Briefly in late 1919 and early 1920, while major fighting was ongoing, he served as garrison commander of Narva and aide to the commander of the 1st division. After the end of the war, Kurvits served as commander of the 2nd and later the 7th infantry regiments until his retirement in October 1921.

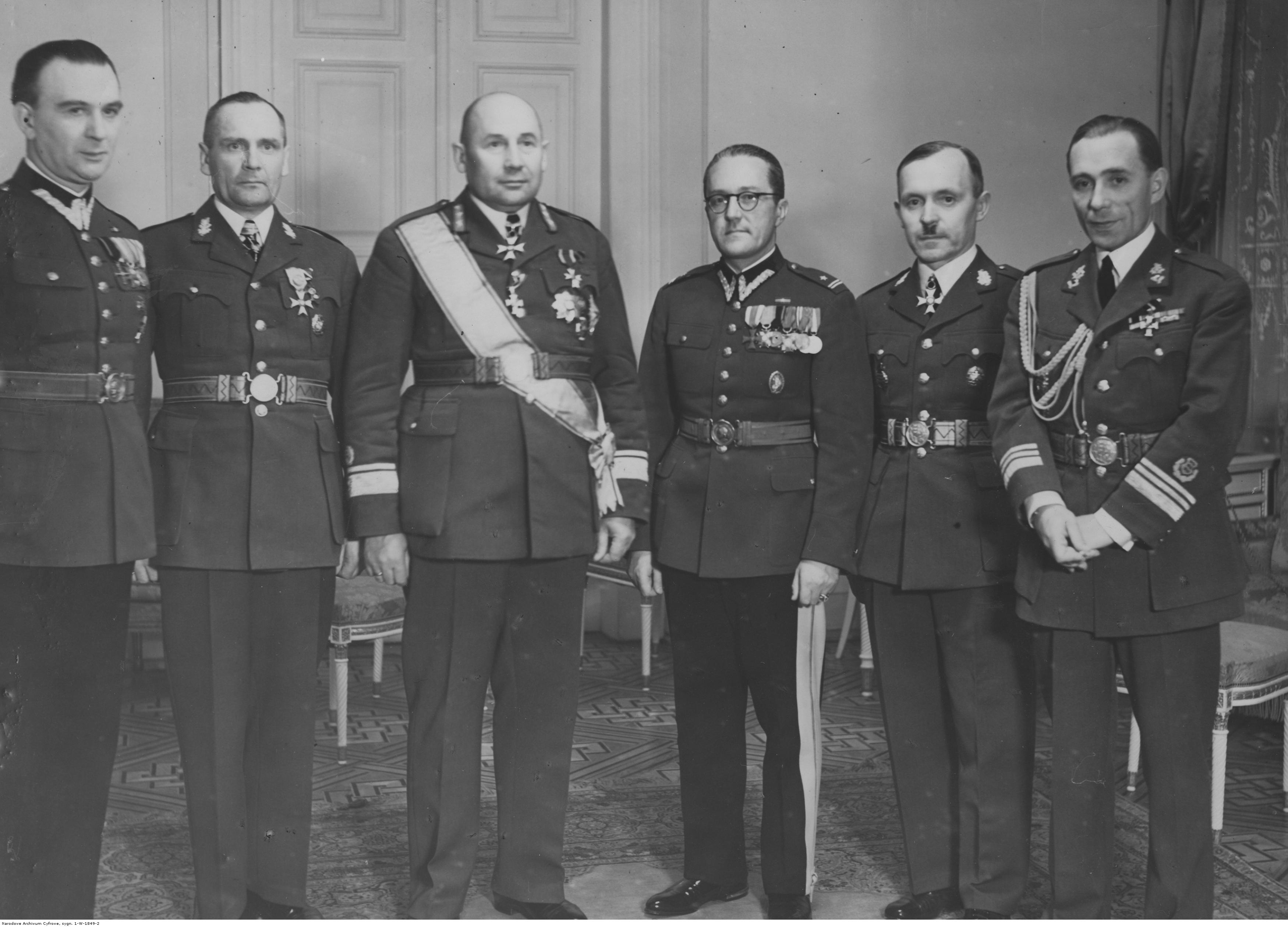
Ants Kurvits in Warsaw, 1939

On 1 November 1922, Kurvits was recalled to service and made head of the newly forming Estonian Border Guard, becoming its first commander. In 1924, he briefly served as Minister of War in the government of Friedrich Akel. After that he returned to head the Border Guard, holding this position up to 1939. In February 1928, he was promoted to colonel, and in February 1932 to major general. As head of the border guard, Kurvits made official visits to Latvia, Finland and Poland. Head of Border Guard was subordinate to the High Commander of the defence forces, holding rights equal to a division commander.

By May 1923, the Border Guard had taken over from Defense Forces guarding of the whole Estonian border. Border Guard guarded 1,159 km of sea border at north and west, 276 km of Soviet border at east and 365 km of Latvia border at south. During period of 1923–1939 the Border Guard exposed 4,491 cases of smuggling and caught 4,651 illegal border crossers. While subordinate to the Minister of Internal Affairs, border guards were all professional military personnel. General Kurvits retired on 22 December 1939.

== Death ==
After the start of Soviet Occupation in 1940, Kurvits's family lost their flat in Tallinn and moved back to Mihkli-Aadu farm. On 14 June 1941, Kurvits and his wife Anna were deported as part of first Soviet mass deportation from the Baltic states. Kurvits was moved to Kirov prison camp in Sosva, Sverdlovsk oblast. On 27 December 1943, he died in Soviet imprisonment.

== Honors ==
During his lifetime Kurvits received numerous awards from Estonia, Russian Empire, Latvia, Finland and Poland, including Estonian Cross of Liberty 1st grade 2nd class, Russian Order of St. George 4th class and Latvian Order of Lāčplēsis 3rd class.

In May 2012, a new multi-purpose ship of the Estonian Police and Border Guard Board EML Kindral Kurvits (PVL-101), was named after General Kurvits.

== Personal life ==
Kurvits married his wife Anna Ariva on 26 December 1917. They had three daughters. After Kurvits became head of the border guard, his family moved to Tallinn, where they lived up to Soviet Occupation period. The home farm at Mihkli-Aadu remained the family's summer home.

== See also ==
- Estonian Border Guard
- Estonian War of Independence

Political offices
Preceded by Oskar Amberg	Minister of War; 1924	Succeeded by Jaan Soots
