= NAVY 18 WP-class patrol boat =

Class of patrol boat developed in Estonia

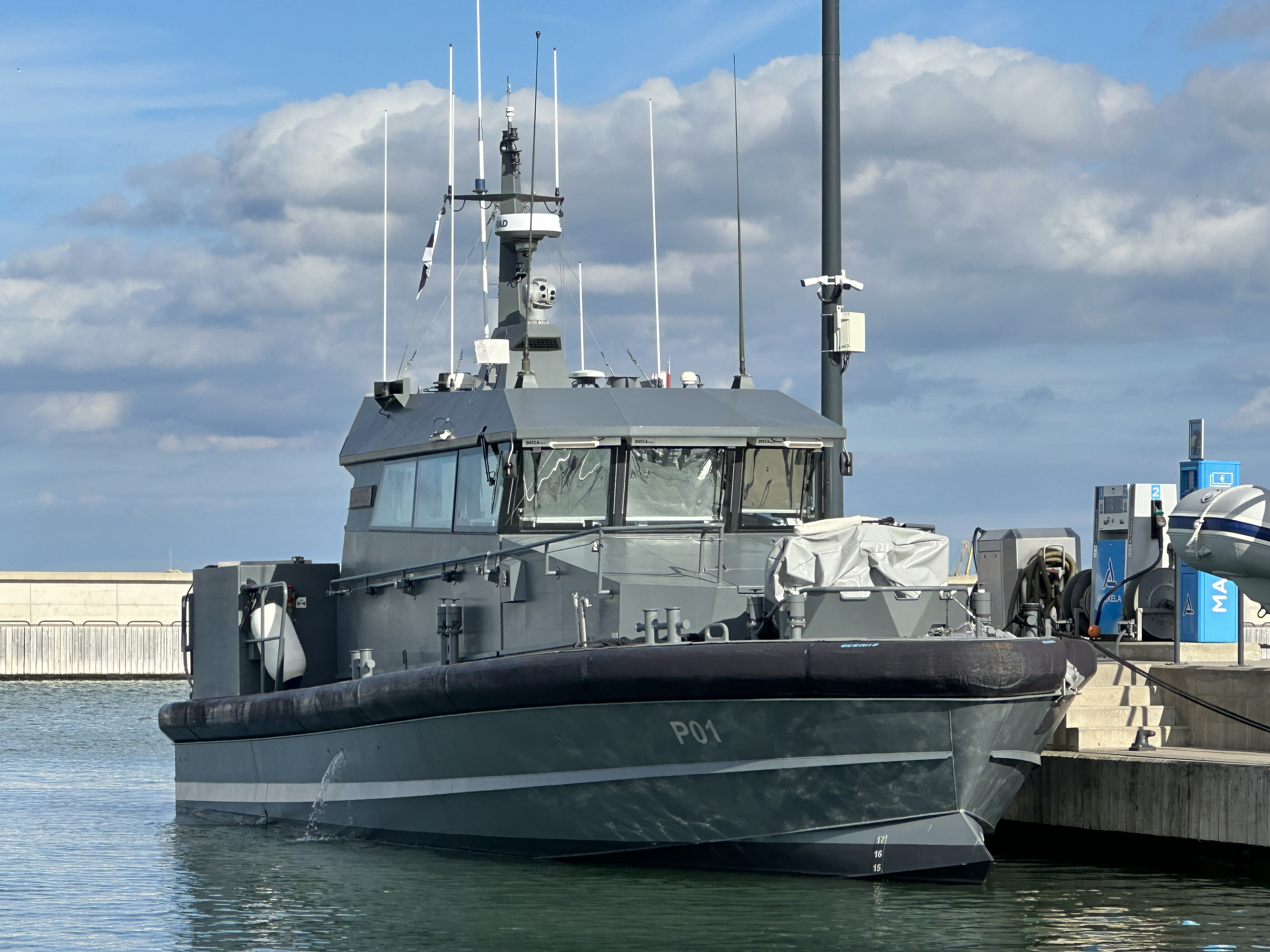
- EML Roland in September 2023

Class overview
- Builders: Baltic Workboats
- Operators: Estonian Navy (former); Ukrainian Navy; Royal Oman Police
- In commission: 2021–present
- Planned: 16
- Building: 3
- Completed: 13

General characteristics
- Type: Patrol boat
- Length: 17.25 m (56 ft 7 in)
- Beam: 5.42 m (17 ft 9 in)
- Draught: 1.6 m (5 ft 3 in)
- Propulsion: 2 × Volvo Penta D13-1000 diesel engines; 2 × fixed pitch propellers
- Speed: 33 knots (38 mph; 61 km/h)
- Range: 230 nmi (430 km) at 25 kn (46 km/h)
- Complement: 6
- Sensors & processing systems: Simrad
- Armament: 1 × 12.7 mm heavy machine gun on FN Herstal Sea DeFNder (RWS); 2 × 7.62 mm general purpose machine guns
- Armour: Ballistic protection

The NAVY 18 WP class is a class of patrol boat, designed by the Estonian shipbuilder Baltic Workboats.

Initially intended to patrol the waters of Estonia's exclusive economic zone (EEZ) as well as rapidly respond to potential maritime border intrusions, they also provided maritime force protection to NATO and partner countries' warships visiting Estonia at sea and in ports. The vessels can also be used for intelligence missions.

== History ==
The WP class were ordered by the Royal Oman Police, with plans to use them for port security in 2022.

In April 2024, Estonia delivered two patrol boats to Ukraine.

A successor class of patrol boats for the Estonian navy was confirmed to be under construction on 16 April 2026. This successor class of patrol boats called the "NAVY 19 WP" is planned to be 20 metres long, designed to carry a small boat, and take into account lessons of its predecessor class.

== Vessels in the class ==
Name	Pennant	Builder	Commissioned	Decommissioned	Status
Estonian Navy
Roland	P01	Baltic Workboats, Nasva	2021	2024	Transferred to Ukraine as Reni
Risto	P02	Baltic Workboats, Nasva	2021	2024	Transferred to Ukraine as Irpin
Ukrainian Navy
Irpin	P182	Baltic Workboats, Nasva	2024		
Reni	P183	Baltic Workboats, Nasva	2024		
