= Estonian Police =

Estonian law enforcement agency

Estonian Police Eesti Politsei
- Seal of the Estonian Police

Agency overview
- Formed: November 12, 1918
- Dissolved: 1 January 2010
- Superseding agency: Police and Border Guard Board

Jurisdictional structure
- Operations jurisdiction: Estonia
- General nature: Civilian police

The Estonian Police (Estonian: Eesti Politsei) was the law enforcement agency of Estonia. It was subordinate to the Ministry of the Interior. In 2010, the organization was superseded by the Police and Border Guard Board.

== History ==
=== Formation and disbandment (1918–1940) ===
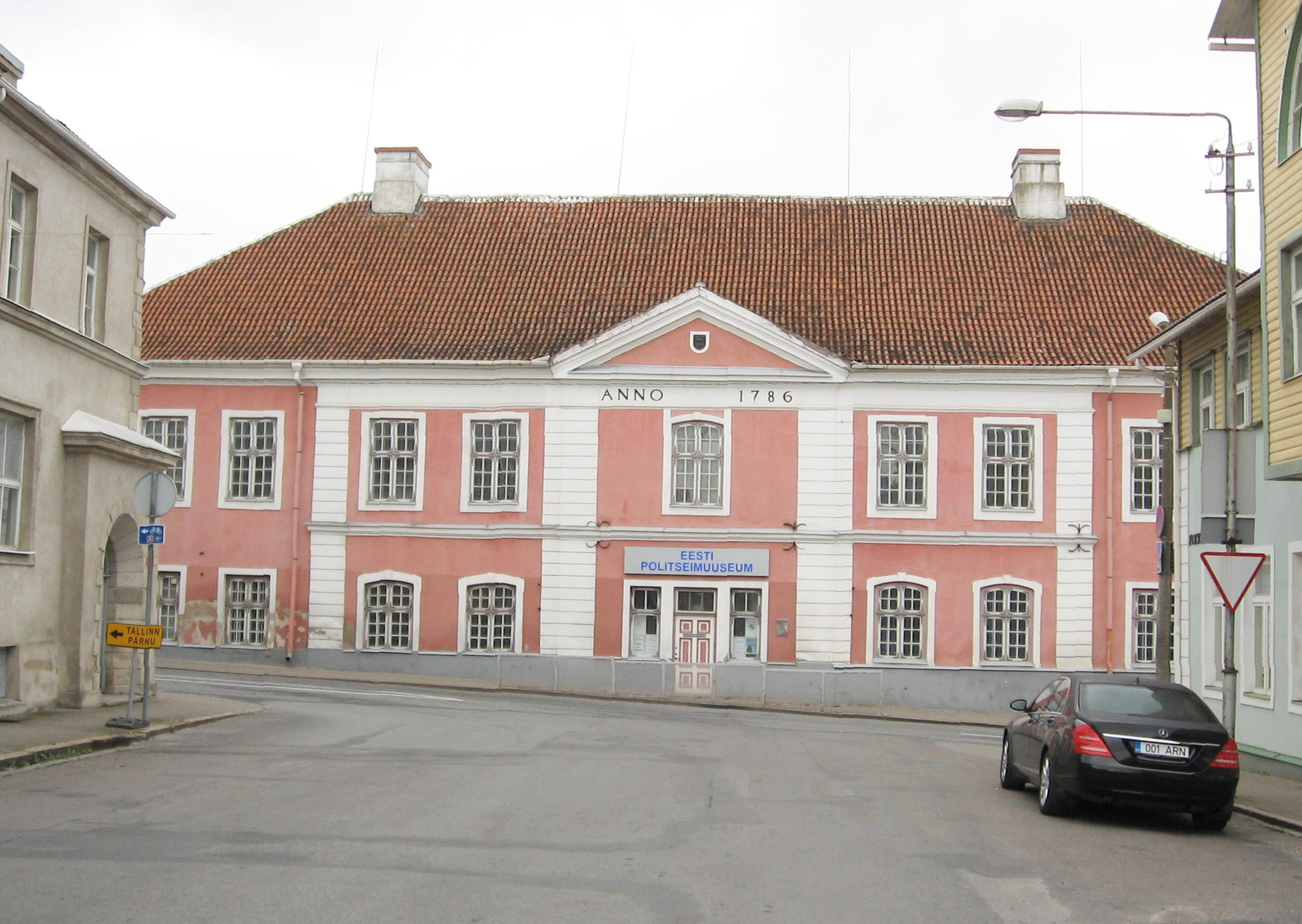
Estonian Police Museum in Rakvere

The Estonian Police was established on 12 November 1918, when police stations were taken over from the German occupation forces by the Chief of Militia – Aleksander Hellat. Between 1918 and 1919, the Estonian police force was called "militia" (Estonian: miilits). It was subordinate to the local self-government and acted according to the Russian Provisional Government law. During the Estonian War of Independence the police was tasked with curtailing crime, helping the military and conducting joint operations with the Estonian Defence League.

On 1 January 1919, the self-government based police became a national agency, subordinate to the Ministry of the Interior and led by the Police Directorate (Estonian: Politsei Peavalitsus). The Police Directorate was called Politseivalitsus between 1929 and 1938, and Politseitalitus between 1938 and 1940. On 17 December 1919, the Estonian Constituent Assembly passed the Police Act. A field police was established, which was tasked with protecting public safety and order. Police districts were formed based on counties and cities, these were divided into divisions, which were further divided into precincts. Criminal police was established on 5 January 1920, and the Estonian Internal Security Service on 12 April 1920. Furthermore, police reserve was established in 1920. The police consisted of field police and the Internal Security Service, which were subordinate to the Ministry of the Interior, and criminal police, which was subordinate to the Ministry of Justice. On 1 May 1924, the services were unified under the control of the Police Directorate. On 1 December 1924, there was a failed coup d'état attempt by the Soviets, in which five policemen were killed. This led to major revisions in the police force. The composition of the staff was put in order, police reserves were enlarged, the number of transportation vehicles was increased, more modern guns were taken into service, and communication options were improved. In 1925, a police school was established in Tallinn.

On 1 January 1926, police districts became prefectures and the Internal Security Service was renamed political police. Police ranks were put in accordance with the rest of Europe. By 1940, there were nine prefectures: Tallinn-Harju, Tartu-Valga, Viljandi-Pärnu, Petseri-Võru, Saare, Lääne, Viru-Järva, Narva, and Railroads prefecture. Education was provided by the Police school between 1925 and 1940. In 1940, the Soviets occupied Estonia and on 28 August, the institution was disbanded. Most policemen fell victim to repressions.

=== Restoration and unification (1990–2010) ===
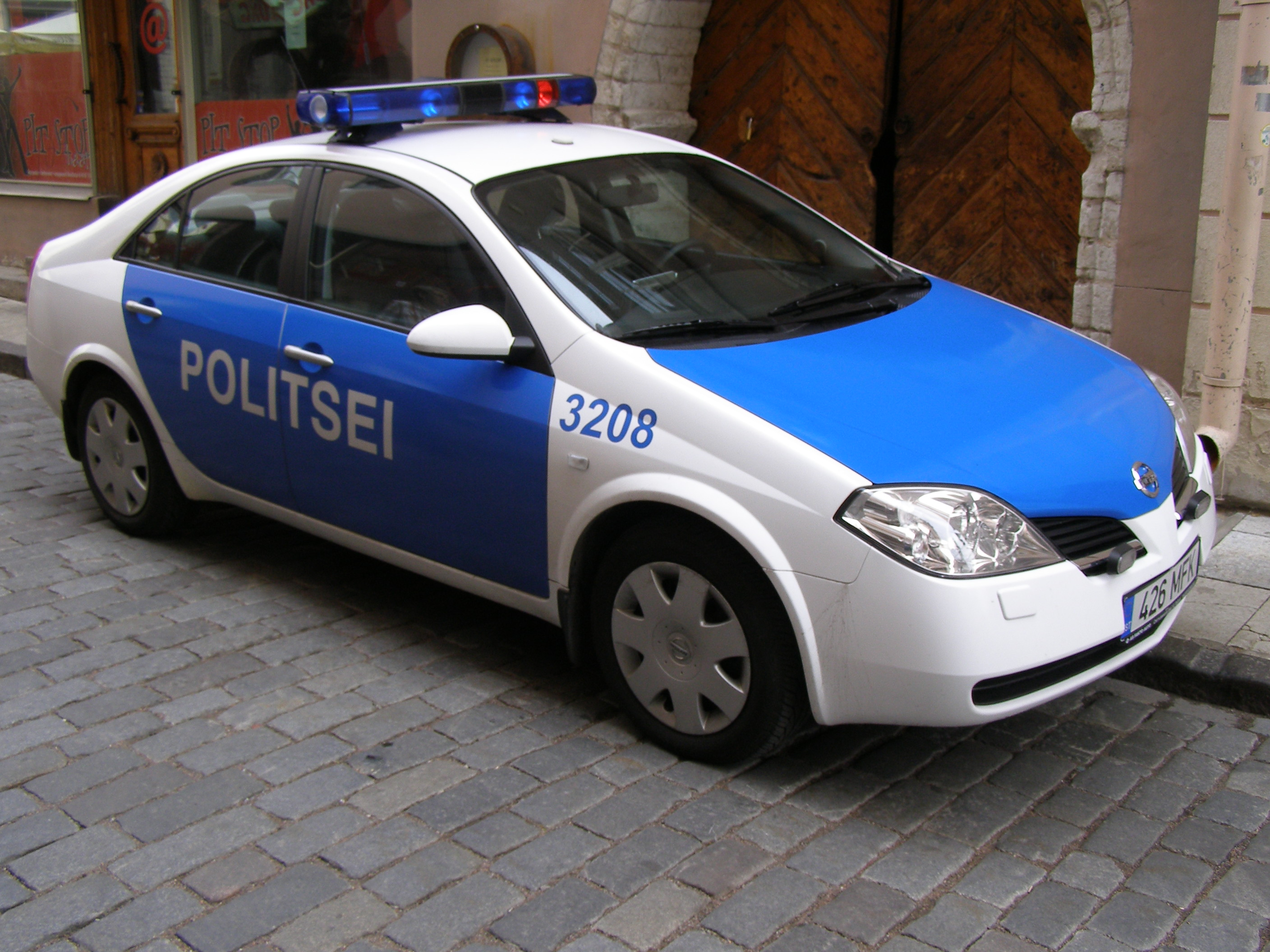
Estonian police car in the late of 2000s

Preparations for the re-establishment of the Estonian Police began in early 1990. On 5 June 1990, a police school was formed in Paikuse. On 1 August 1990, the Estonian Ministry of the Interior became independent from the Soviet Ministry of the Interior. The Police Act, which essentially abolished the former militsiya structure and re-established the police, was passed on 20 September. Jüri Nurme became the Director General of the police on 31 October. The central police institution, called Estonian: Eesti Vabariigi Riiklik Politseiamet, was formed on 20 November and prefectures on 23 November. The institution consisted of police bureaux, police reserve, police prefectures, transport police prefectures, Internal Security Service, police academy, police school, minors bureau, Estonian address office, forensic bureau, special service, security team, and police dog training department. The Estonian Police was officially re-established within the jurisdiction of the Ministry of the Interior on 1 March 1991. The re-established institution consisted of four main services: field-, traffic-, criminal-, and investigative police. The initial situation of was dire. There was a serious lack of personnel and equipment during the formation of the institution. In addition, the personnel that was hired tended to be inexperienced and personnel turnover rate was high. Furthermore, crime was rising daily and in August 1991, the police had to face the threat of a coup d'état. However, the difficulties were eventually surmounted.

In 1993, the police went through a significant reform. The Estonian Internal Security Service was re-established as a separate entity based on the Internal Security Service department of the police. The central police institution was renamed the Estonian: Riigi Politseiamet. Several of the departments were also reorganized and renamed. In 2004, the police went through another significant reform, which reduced the number of prefectures from 17 to four.

The Estonian Police received a lot of foreign help during its formative years. Finland supported the creation of the police school in Paikuse. Sweden and Germany gave material support in addition to training. USA and UK also helped with training and served an advisory role. On 4 November 1992, the Estonian Police became a full member of Interpol and in 1996 started participating in international peacekeeping and police missions. On 10 November 2001, Estonia signed a cooperation agreement with Europol and in 2005 became its full member. The Estonian Police also joined such organizations as the European Police Sports Union (joined in 1994), International Police Association (1995), International Association of Chiefs of Police (1997), European Network of Policewomen (2001), as well as the Nordic-Baltic Network of Policewomen (2001).

On 1 January 2010, the Estonia Police was joined with the Estonian Border Guard to form the Police and Border Guard Board.

== See also ==
- Estonian Rescue Board
- Crime in Estonia
