= List of active Estonian Navy ships =

Naval ensign of Estonian Navy

This is a list of active Estonian Navy ships. In total there are 7 commissioned ships in the navy.

In 2023 the Naval Fleet of the Police and Border Guard Board was merged with the Estonian Navy, meaning that the Police and Border Guard Board transferred its four sizeable sea-going patrol vessels, the Kindral Kurvits, the EML Pikker, the EML Valve, and the EML Raju, to Estonian Navy and retained only some smaller boats (and 3 hovercraft). The transfer was made to improve coastal patrol capabilities and save money.

EML Pikker retired at the end of 2025.

== Ships ==
Class	Type	Ships	Displacement	Note
Lindormen class	Minelayer	EML Wambola (A433)	577 tonnes	Purchased from Denmark in 2006, former HDMS (KDM) Lossen. Served the Estonian Maritime Academy as a maritime training vessel MS Kristiina. Commissioned in 2016 to replace EML Tasuja (A432).
Sandown class	Minehunter	EML Admiral Cowan (M313)	450 tonnes	Former Royal Navy vessel HMS Sandown, purchased in 2006. In refit as of June 2026. Suffered damage to her hull due to heavy ice conditions.
Sandown class	Minehunter	EML Sakala (M314)	450 tonnes	Former Royal Navy vessel HMS Inverness, purchased in 2006. In refit as of June 2026 after being damaged in a fire in early 2026.
Sandown class	Minehunter	EML Ugandi (M315)	450 tonnes	Former Royal Navy vessel HMS Bridport. Active as of June 2026.
Kindral Kurvits class	Patrol vessel	EML Kindral Kurvits (P101)	1367 tonnes	Former Police and Border Guard Board vessel. Active as of June 2026.
Raju class	Patrol vessel	EML Raju (P6732)	260 tonnes	Former Police and Border Guard Board vessel. In refit as of June 2026. Suffered damage to her propellers during maintenance in Pärnu.
Valve class	Patrol vessel	EML Valve (P112)	79 tonnes	Former Police and Border Guard Board vessel.

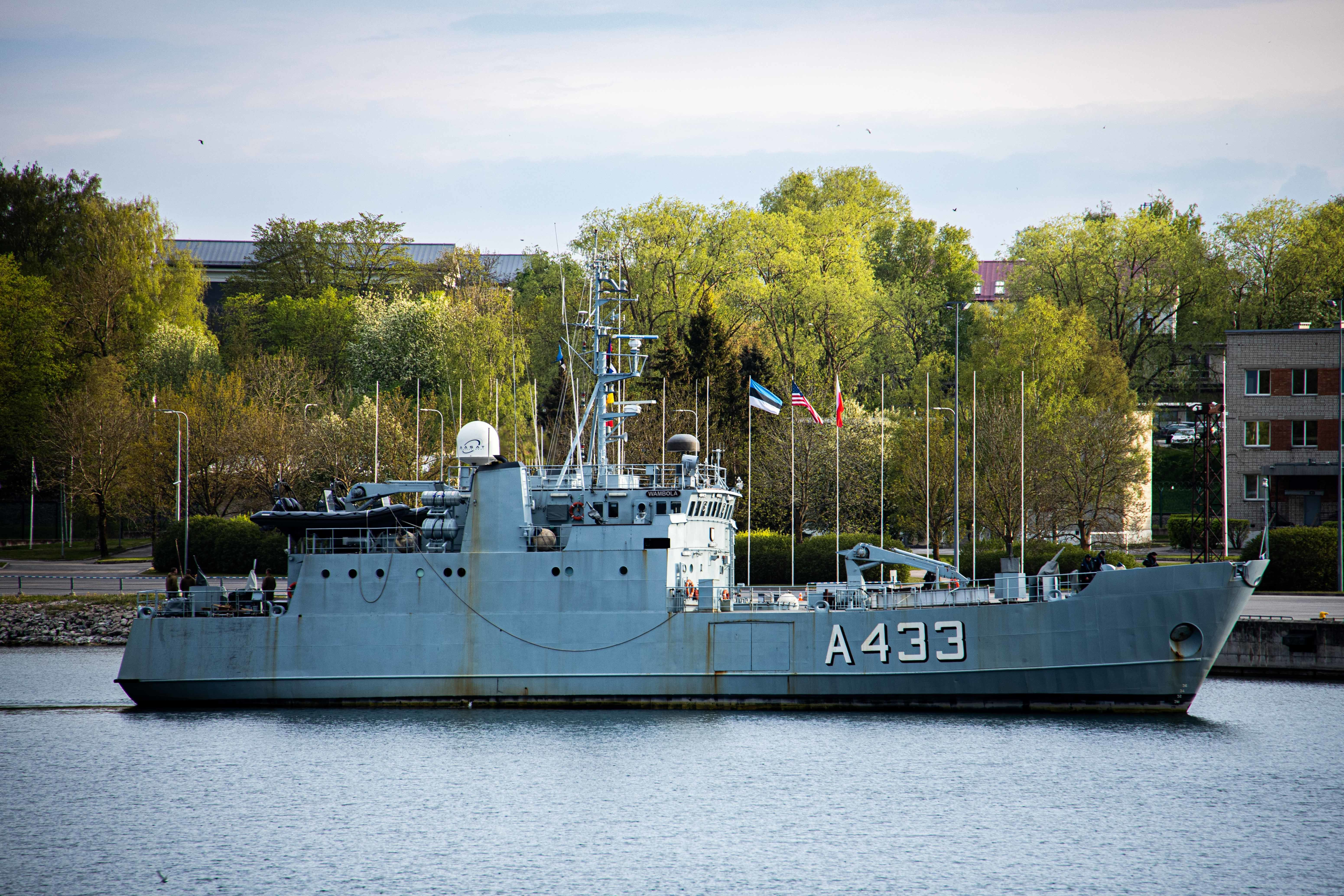
Lindormen class

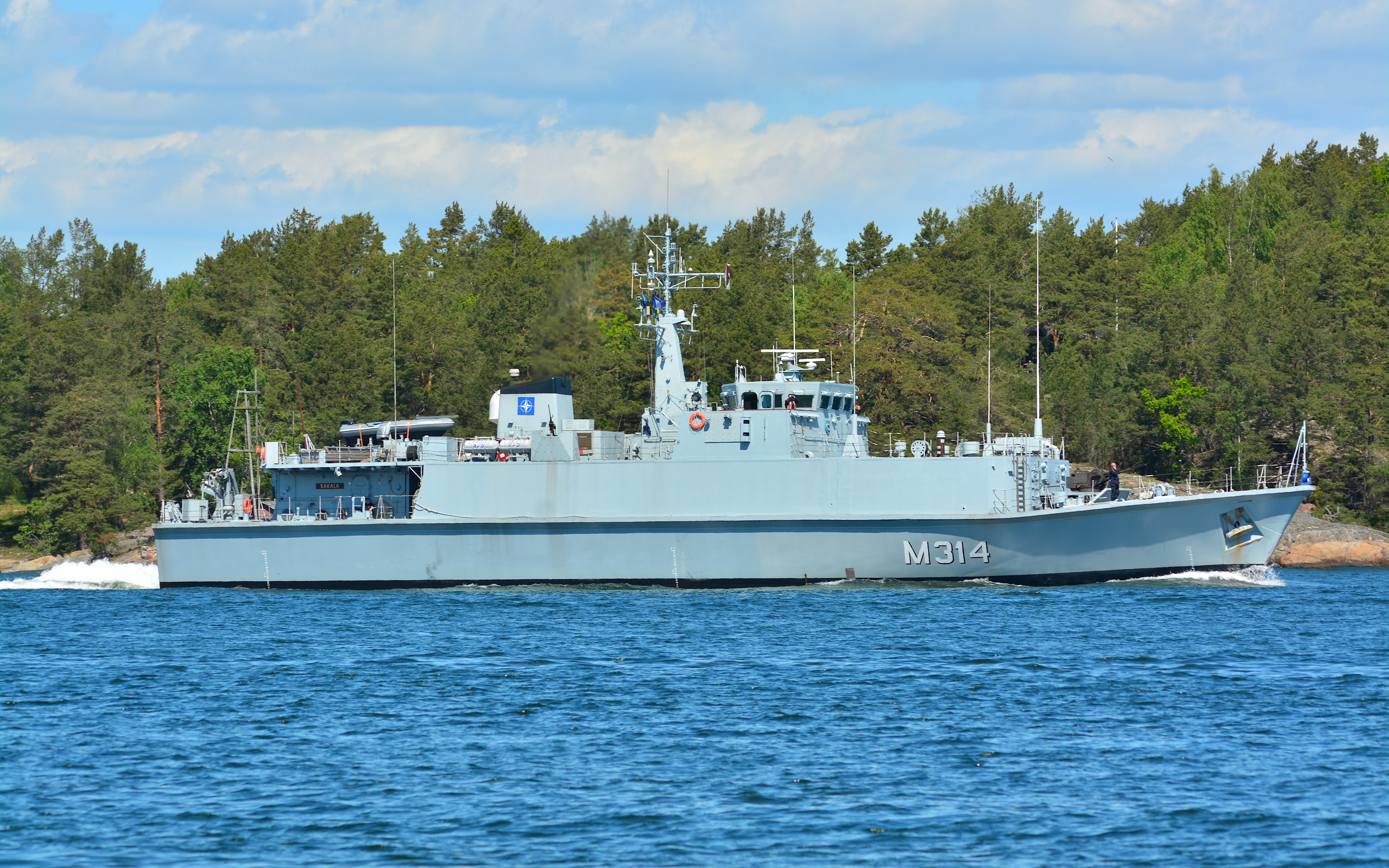
Sandown class

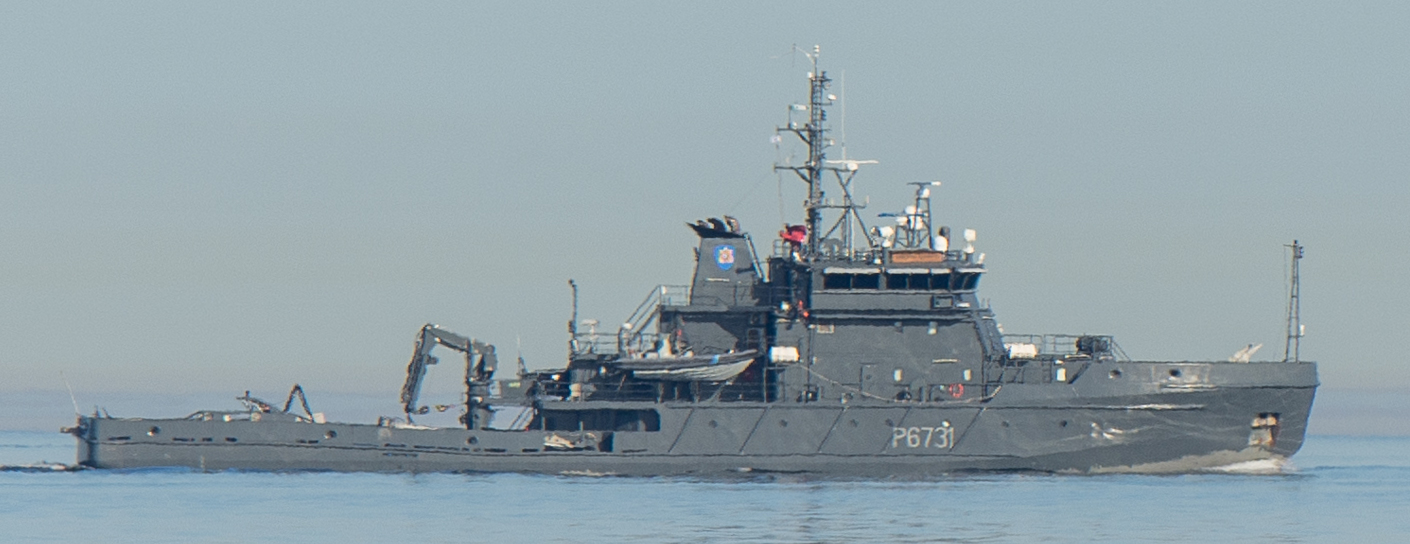
Kurvits class

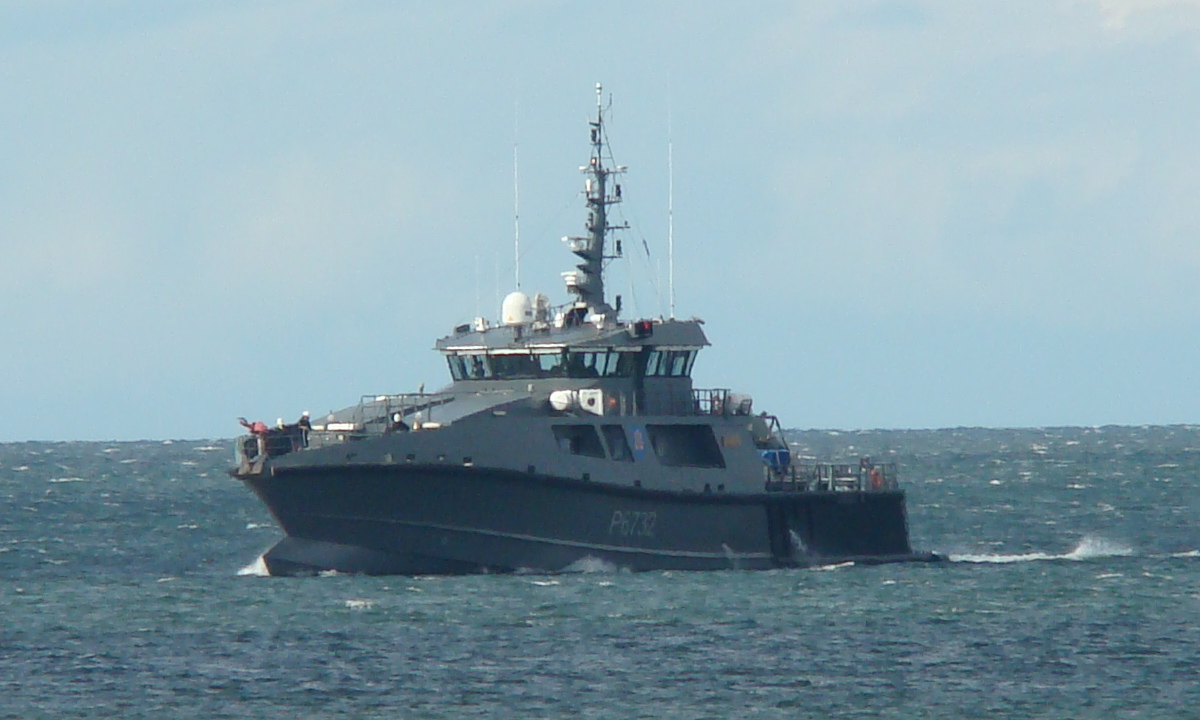
PATROL 45 WP HYBRID class (EML Raju)

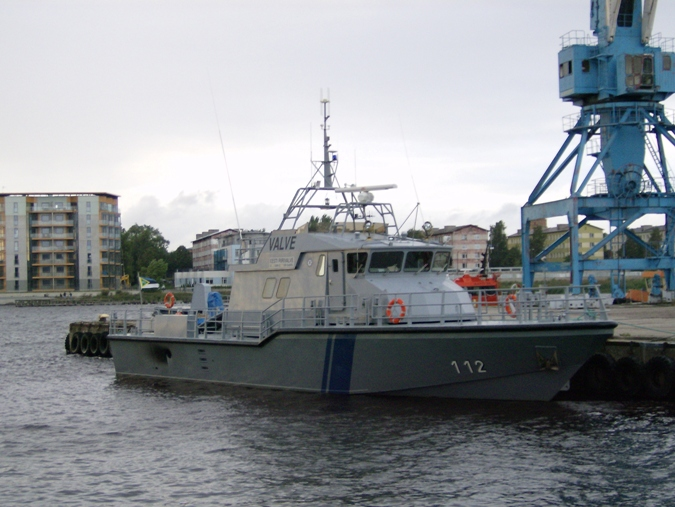
Valve class
