= Estonian Firefighting Museum =

Museum in Tallinn

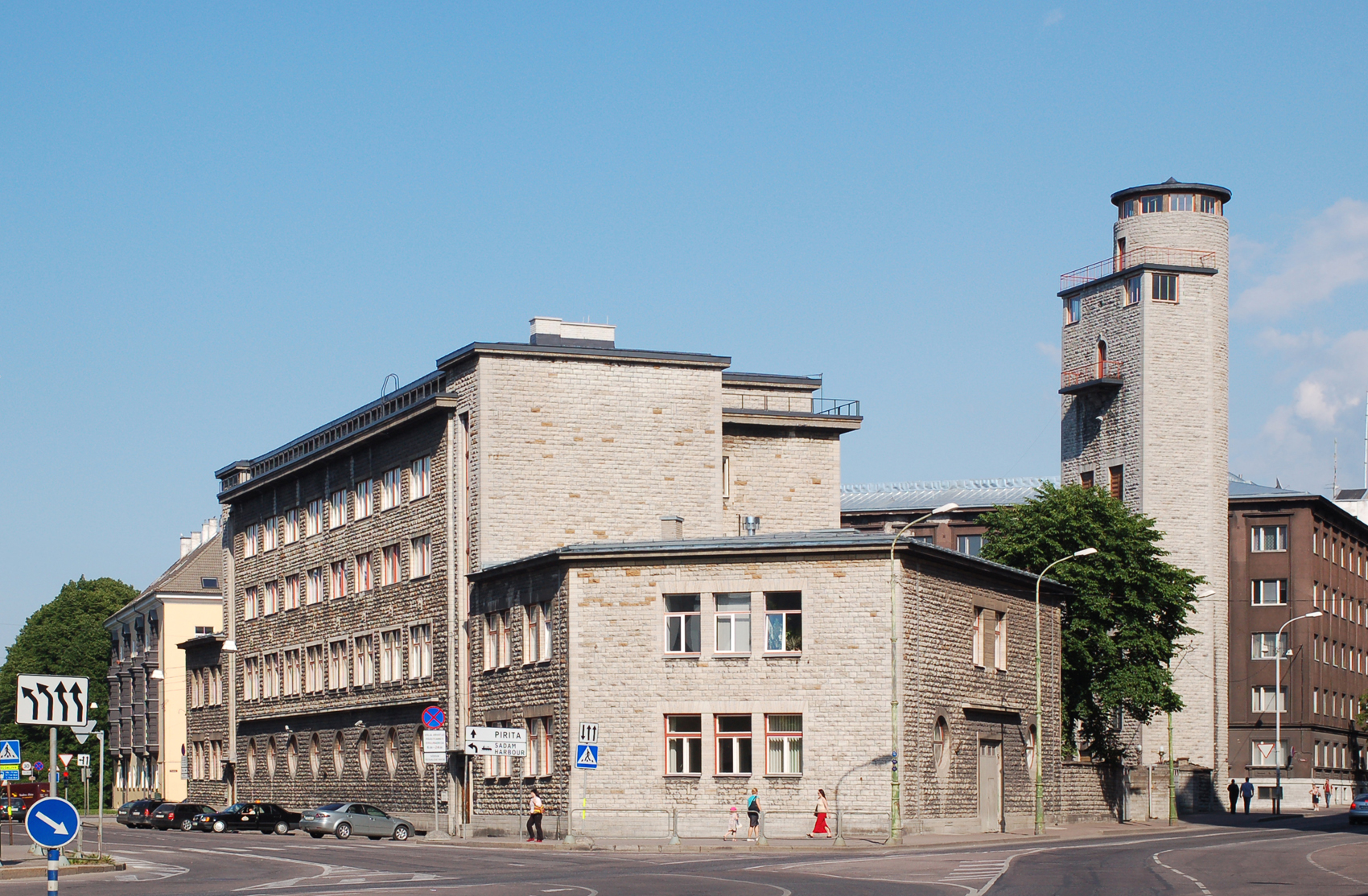
- Established: 30 October 1974
- Location: Raua 2, Tallinn, Estonia
- Type: Fire Museum
- Director: Ivo Paulus
- Website: http://www.tuletorjemuuseum.ee/en

The Estonian Firefighting Museum (Estonian: Eesti Tuletõrjemuuseum) is a museum in Tallinn presenting the historical heritage of firefighting in Estonia. The first volunteer fire department in Estonia was created in 1788 by the Brotherhood of the Blackheads, which was one of the first firefighting brigades in contemporary Europe. The first professional fire departments were established shortly after the end of the First World War, in 1919.

== History ==
The Estonian Firefighting Museum was established in 1974, which makes it one of the oldest active fire museums in Eastern Europe. From 1974 to 2003, the museum was located in the historic fire house on Vana-Viru Street. Since 2007 the Firefighting Museum has been located in the fire station on Raua Street. The exhibits consist of the antique firefighting equipment, and there are currently plans to expand the museum, including to open an exhibition of fire engines and to use the historic tower of the fire station.

== See also ==
- Estonian Rescue Board
