= IT and Development Centre. Ministry of the Interior, Estonia =

Government agency of Estonia

IT and Development Centre of the Ministry of the Interior
- Siseministeeriumi infotehnoloogia- ja arenduskeskus
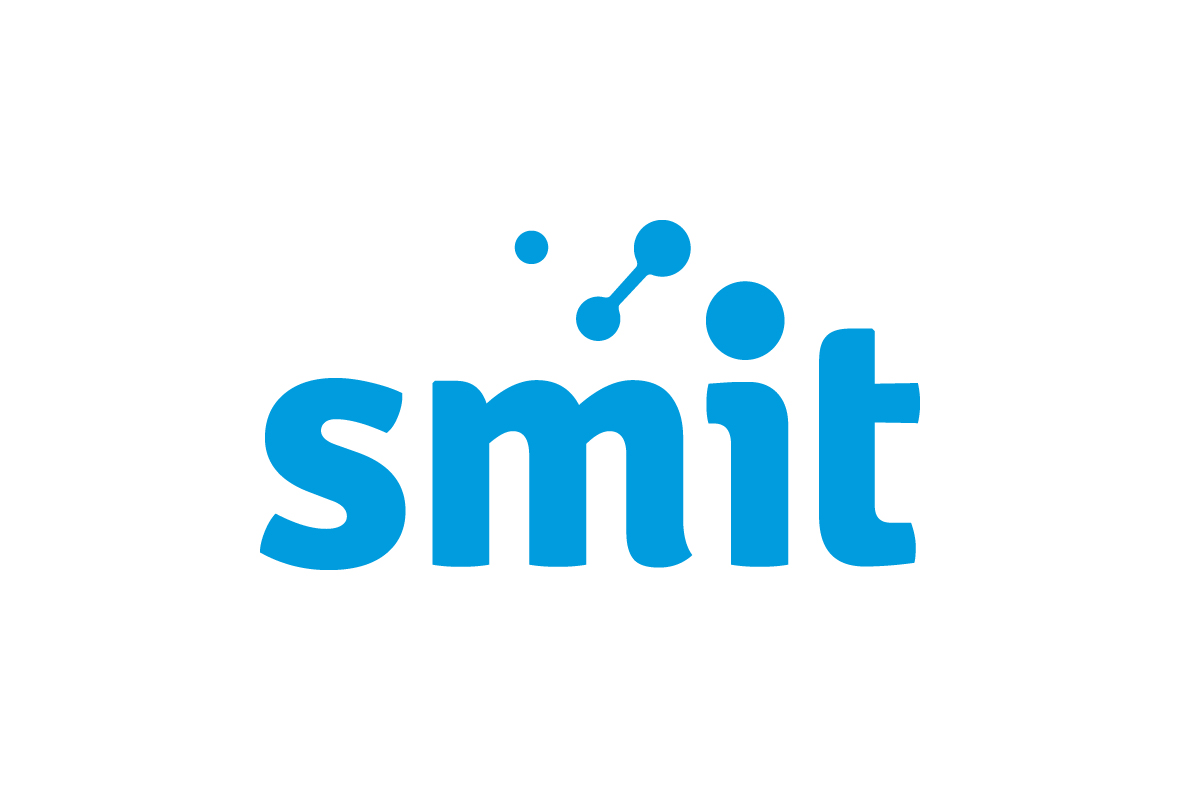

Agency overview
- Formed: 1 March 2010
- Jurisdiction: Government of Estonia
- Headquarters: Mäealuse 2/2, 12618 Tallinn, Estonia
- Agency executive: Mart Nielsen, Director-General
- Parent department: Ministry of the Interior
- Website: https://www.smit.ee

The IT and Development Centre, Ministry of the Interior (Estonian: Siseministeeriumi infotehnoloogia- ja arenduskeskus, SMIT) is an Estonian government agency under the Ministry of the Interior responsible for providing the developing ICT services mainly to Police and Border Guard Board, Estonian Rescue Board, Estonian Emergency Response Centre, Estonian Academy of Security Sciences and the Ministry of the Interior.

== Services ==
SMIT manages more than 100 ICT services. Following keywords will characterize the services managed by SMIT:

- National population register and ICT services related to management of identities;
- ICT services related to application of documents (passports, ID cards, residence cards, visas);
- ICT services related to emergency and rescue services;
- ICT services related to law enforcement and criminal investigations;
- ICT services related to border check and border surveillance;
- operative radio communications networks;

== Structure ==
- Department of services.
- Department of technologies.
- Department of development.
- Security unit.
- Finance and legal unit.
- Staff department.

== See also ==
- Police and Border Guard Board
- Estonian Rescue Board
- Estonian Internal Security Service
- Estonian Academy of Security Sciences
