= Vabatahtlik Reservpäästerühm =

Organization based in Estonia

Volunteer Reserve Rescue Team
- Vabatahtlik Reservpäästerühm
- Formation: April 28, 2005; 21 years ago
- Type: Non-governmental organization
- Registration no.: 80222068
- Purpose: Rescue services
- Location: Jaama 4, 11621 Tallinn, Estonia
- Volunteers: 202
- Website: Official website

Volunteer Reserve Rescue Team (Estonian: Vabatahtlik Reservpäästerühm) is an Estonian non-governmental organization. The organization was established in 2002 in order to support the professional rescue in case of extensive natural and civilian disasters (forest fires and oil spills, for example) and to support the police to finding missing persons. The main purpose is to provide these organizations with help of volunteers as a skilled and organized force.

== Volunteers ==
Volunteers of different professions are the members of the team, amongst them are dog-handlers with their specially trained search and rescue (SAR) dogs. Persons joining the team are presumed to have covered the basic training. Basic training involves 40-hour preparation and practice on knowledge, as well as using fire extinction equipment, and 16-hour training of first aid. Additionally, members can choose among different special trainings from psychology to leadership in emergency situations.

== Prevention work ==
Besides operating as a reserve, prevention work is another important aspect of the team's function. The aim is to raise awareness on fire safety and to instruct different target groups from children to adults how to react in certain critical situations. Training goes from fire extinction to first aid.

== Specialized groups ==
Team's members can choose between 4 specialized groups to have a certain preparation beside the basic training to react on situations. These groups are:

- Rescue group
- Search group
- First aid group
- Logistics group

== See also ==
- Estonian Rescue Board
- Estonian Voluntary Rescue Association

== Sources ==
- Volunteer Reserve Rescue Team
