= Nasva, Saare County =

Borough in Estonia

Nasva
- Small borough
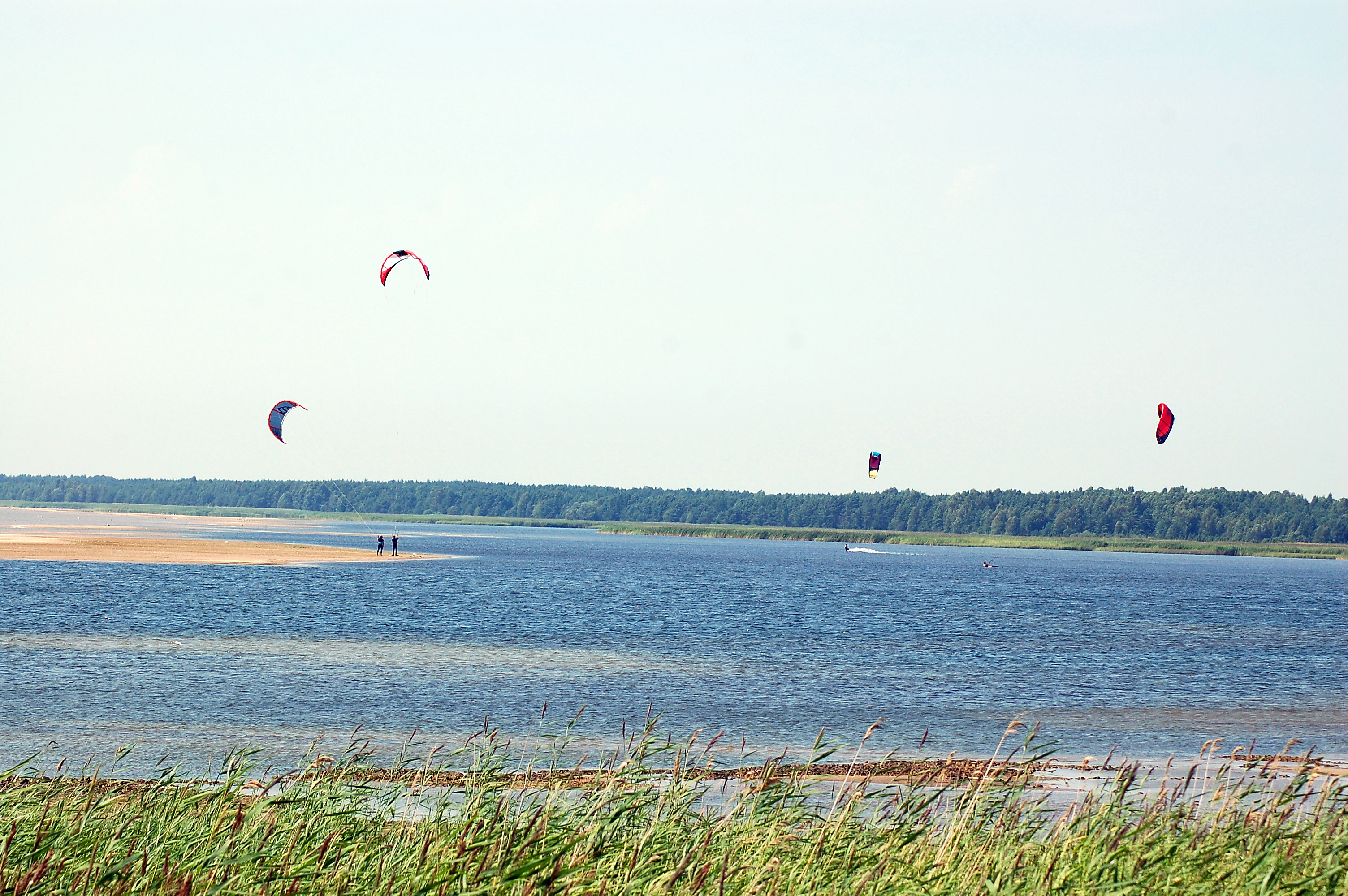
- Kitesurfing in Nasva

- Location in Estonia
- Coordinates: 58°13′42″N 22°23′05″E
- Country: Estonia
- County: Saare County
- Municipality: Saaremaa Parish

Population (01.01.2009)
  - Total: 367

Nasva is a small borough (Estonian: alevik) in Saaremaa Parish, Saare County in western Estonia.

It has a population of 454 (as of 1 January 2011).

The mouth of Nasva River is located in Nasva.

Shipbuilding companies Baltic Workboats and Saare Yachts are located in Nasva.
