= EML Kindral Kurvits =

2012 Estonian ship

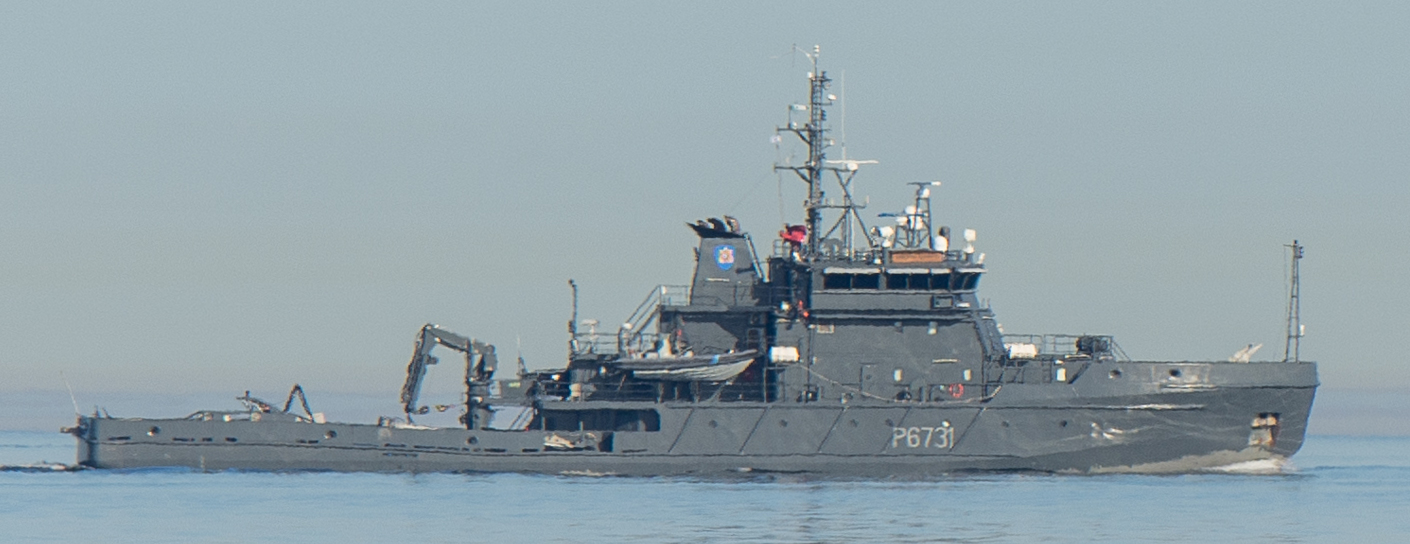
- EML Kindral Kurvits

History

Estonia
- Name: Kindral Kurvits
- Namesake: Ants Kurvits
- Operator: Police and Border Guard Board
- Ordered: 15 April 2010
- Builder: Uki Workboat
- Acquired: 3 August 2012
- Commissioned: 3 August 2012
- Decommissioned: 2 January 2023
- Fate: Transferred to Estonian Navy

Estonia
- Name: EML Kindral Kurvits
- Operator: Estonian Navy
- Commissioned: 3 January 2023
- Status: In service
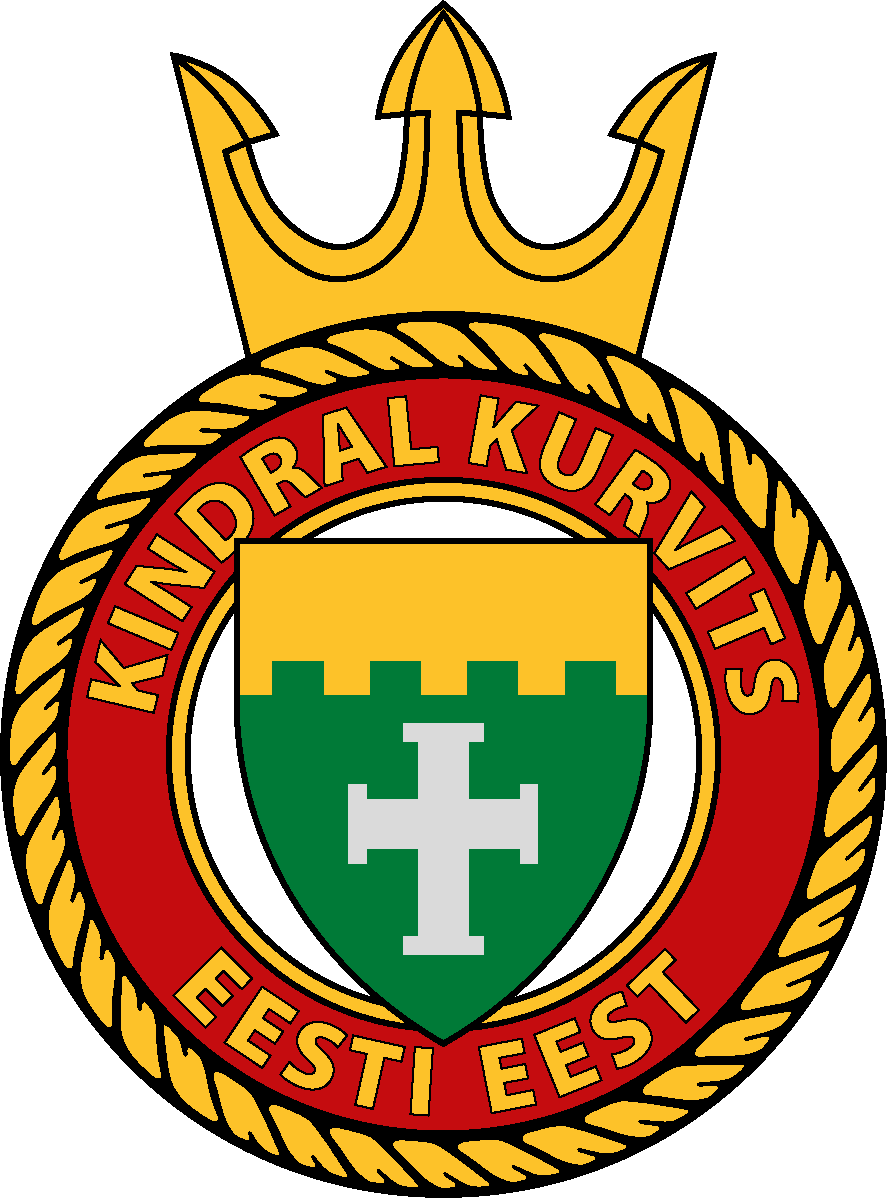
- Badge

General characteristics
- Tonnage: 1,053 GT
- Displacement: 1300 tons full
- Length: 63.9 m (209 ft 8 in)
- Beam: 10.2 m (33 ft 6 in)
- Draught: 4.2 m (13 ft 9 in)
- Propulsion: 2x Wärtsilä 8L20; 1 × Rolls-Royce TT 1300 DPN CP bow thruster
- Speed: 15 knots (28 km/h; 17 mph)
- Complement: 14

EML Kindral Kurvits is a Kurvits-class multi-purpose patrol vessel. Built in 2012 by Uki Workboat.

At the beginning of 2023, four larger ships of Police and Border Guard Board, including Kindral Kurvits, were transferred to Estonian Navy. This improved responsiveness in the Estonian maritime area and provided Estonia with a better defense capability.

== History ==
On 21-22 November 2026, Kindral Kurvits, alongside several Russian, Finnish and Estonian vessels, rendered assistance to the Russian merchant ship MV Sparta II, after it was damaged in a Ukrainian drone attack near Loviisa in the Gulf of Finland. Kindral Kurvits assumed the role of a fireboat alongside the Russian rescue ship Murman and the Finnish Coast Guard vessel Uisko.

== See also ==
- List of active Estonian Navy ships
