= Estonian Voluntary Rescue Association =

Organization based in Estonia

Estonian Rescue Association
- Päästeliit
- Formation: January 22, 2010; 16 years ago
- Type: Non-governmental organization
- Registration no.: 80302703
- Purpose: Rescue services
- Location: Sirge 2, 10618 Tallinn, Estonia
- Chairman of the Management Board: Piia Kallas
- Main organ: General Assembly of the Rescue Association
- Volunteers: 3,000+
- Website: paasteliit.ee

The Estonian Rescue Association (Estonian: Päästeliit) is a non-profit association of volunteer rescue service organisations. Its main goals are the development of joint activities of voluntary rescue services, standing for the interests of its members, introduction and implementation of good practices of joint activities, and the involvement of its members and the general public in the development of civil society in Estonia.

== History ==
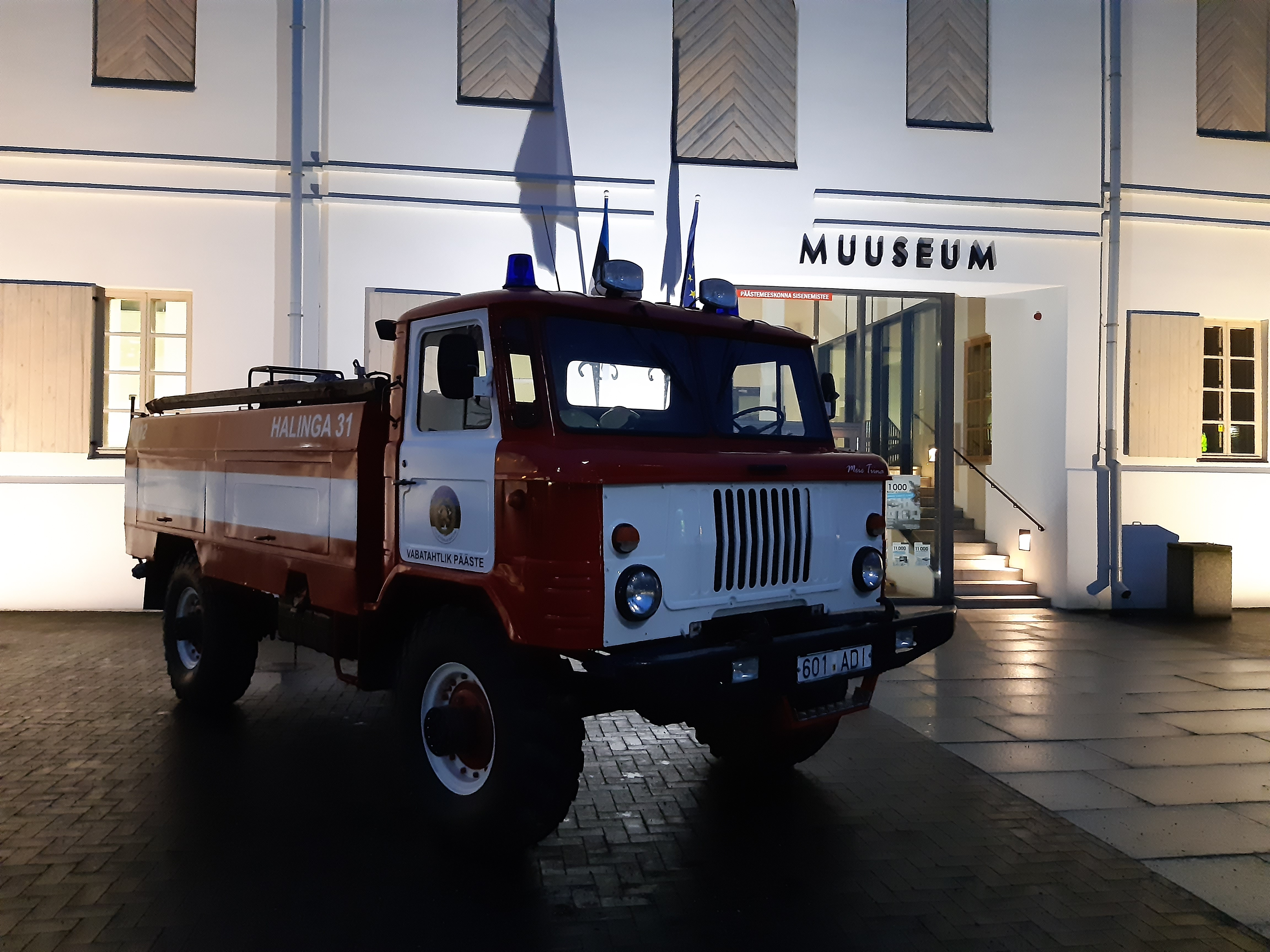
Fire engine of Pärnu-Jaagupi Tuletõrjeselts in front of Pärnu Museum

Since 2006, a think-tank had been meeting to discuss joint activities of volunteer rescue organizations. This led to the realization that the formation of a joint association might be necessary. Preparations for it began in September 2008. An initiative group was assembled in 2009, which started consulting with various governmental and non-governmental organizations, and drawing up a plan for the association. The idea was that the association would enable joint procurement, sharing of resources, and would counsel and coordinate the various volunteer organizations.

Estonian Rescue Association was officially founded on 22 January 2010 in Riigikogu. Since its establishment, the association has formed many partnerships with various organizations, including the International Maritime Rescue Federation, International Association of Fire and Rescue Services, The Confederation of Fire Protection Associations Europe, Estonian Rescue Board, Estonian Defence League and many others.

== Structure ==
The organization is led by the Chairman of the Management Board. The Management Board, which manages and represents the organization on a daily basis, can have up to five members, who are elected and supported by the Supervisory Board for a term of three years. The Supervisory Board consists of representatives from each region of Estonia, in addition to two general representatives and one honorary member from the Estonian Fire Brigade Association. The Supervisory Board is led by a chairman, who is elected from among its members. Members of the Supervisory Board are in turn elected by the General Assembly for a period of three years. The General Assembly is held at least once a year.

== See also ==
- Estonian Rescue Board
- Vabatahtlik Reservpäästerühm
