= Police and Border Guard Aviation Group =

Estonian police and border guard unit

Police and Border Guard Board Aviation Group
- Politsei- ja piirivalveameti lennusalk
- Logo of the Police and Border Guard Board Aviation Group
- Country: Estonia
- Agency: Police and Border Guard Board
- Role: Border patrol; Search and rescue; Medical evacuation
- Headquarters: Väike-Sõjamäe 22A, 11415 Tallinn

Commanders
- Current commander: Kalmer Sütt

Notables
- Anniversaries: 8 February 1993

The Police and Border Guard Aviation Group (Estonian: Politsei- ja piirivalveameti lennusalk) is a mixed helicopter and airplane flight unit formerly operating under the Estonian Border Guard, but now subordinate to the Police and Border Guard Board. The squadron is a rapid response search and rescue unit, which also conducts medical transport and border patrol operations.

== History ==
The creation of the unit began with the establishment of the Border Guard Flight Department in 1992. The unit was officially established on 8 February 1993, under the name of National Border Guard Squadron and the unit started operating from Tallinn Airport. Arvo Palumäe became the commander of the squadron. The squadron initially operated two Let L-410 airplanes, donated by Germany in 1992 and received on 23 February 1993. The airplanes started participating in HELCOM flights that same year. On 1 September 1994, based on the squadron, the Estonian National Aviation Group was established. The unit participated in the rescue efforts of the MS Estonia disaster. As a result of that tragedy, a helicopter squadron was quickly established during that same year. German Air Rescue (German: DRF Luftrettung) donated four former Air Forces of the National People's Army's Mil Mi-8 helicopters for the squadron (a fifth one was sent for spare parts), which were officially handed over on 7 December 1995. On 22 April 1997, the unit was subordinated to the Estonian Border Guard again and renamed the Border Guard Aviation Group. In 1999, Allan Oksmann became the commander of the unit. Between 2007 and 2011, the unit received new AW139 utility helicopters to replace aging Mil Mi-8 helicopters. The unit participated in a Frontex mission called "Poseidon 2009" with one maritime patrol aircraft. In 2010, the unit was transferred to the newly established Police and Border Guard Board and made subordinate to the Border Guard Board. The unit has been under the command of Kalmer Sütt since at least 2012. A new complex of the Border Guard Board was opened at the Kuressaare Airport in 2013, with one AW139 helicopter stationed there. The unit transferred under the Intelligence Management and Investigation Department during a restructuring of the Police and Border Guard Board in 2014. In 2020, the aviation group was moved under the Border Guard Department.

== Equipment ==
=== Current equipment ===
Model	Image	Origin	Type	Number	Notes
Aircraft
Beechcraft Super King Air 350ER		United States	Maritime patrol aircraft	1	Delivered in 2018 to replace L-410. Marked ES-PKY.
Cessna 172R		United States	Utility aircraft	1	Used for flight training and patrol duties. Delivered in 2003. Marked ES-PCO.
AgustaWestland AW139		Italy	Utility helicopter	3	First delivered in 2007 (ES-PWA), second in 2008 (ES-PWB) and third in 2011 (ES-PWC). Tasked with SAR, border patrol, medical missions and utility duties. Due to unreliability (especially de-icing system unreliability) and maintenance difficulties (spare parts hard to find), considerations for replacement taking place for years (as of 2025).

=== Former equipment ===
Model	Image	Origin	Type	Number	Notes
Let L-410UVP		Czech	Utility aircraft	2	Donated by Germany in 1992. ES-PLY (formerly ES-EPI) was retired and donated to Estonian Aviation Museum in 2017. In 2007 ES-PLW (formerly ES-EPA) was equipped with MSS 6000 maritime surveillance system. It was sold off on an auction in 2018.
Mil Mi-8		USSR	Utility helicopter	4	Donated by Germany in 1995. Two helicopters (ES-PMC and ES-PMD) were modernized between 1997-1998. ES-PMC was retired in 2006 and put on display at the Police and Border Guard College in Muraste, ES-PMA was donated to Estonian Aviation Museum, ES-PMB was never in active use and got auctioned off, ES-PMD was given to the city of Valga in 2009 to be put on exposition.
Schweizer 300C		United States	Training and patrol helicopter	1	Purchased in 1999 and phased out in 2006. Marked ES-PSF. Owned at some point by Estonian Aviation Academy. As of 2025 in Estonian Aviation Museum collections.
Enstrom 480B		United States	Training and patrol helicopter	1	Ordered by the Environmental Inspectorate of Estonia in 2006, but operated by the flight squadron. Sold in 2018 due to troubled reliability and a need for additional funds. Marked ES-PEG.
