= Estonian Border Guard =

Government agency of Estonia

Estonian Border Guard Eesti Piirivalve
- Seal of the Estonian Border Guard

- Flag of the Estonian Border Guard

Agency overview
- Formed: November 1, 1922
- Dissolved: 1 January 2010
- Superseding agency: Police and Border Guard Board

Jurisdictional structure
- Operations jurisdiction: Estonia
- Specialist jurisdiction: National border patrol, security, integrity

The Estonian Border Guard (Estonian: Eesti Piirivalve) was the national security agency responsible for the border security of Estonia. It was subordinate to the Ministry of the Interior. The Border Guard also assisted with Search and Rescue missions. In 2010, the organization was superseded by the Police and Border Guard Board.

== History ==
=== Formation and pre-war years (1918-1940) ===
On November 14, 1918, admiral Johan Pitka organized a meeting to discuss the guarding of borders of the freshly established Republic of Estonia. On November 18, 1918, the Border Guard government (Estonian: Piirivalvevalitsus) was established, with captain Leopold Tõnson leading it. Until 1 January 1919, the agency was subordinate to the Estonian Defence League Council of Elders (Estonian: Kaitseliidu Vanematekogu), but was then subordinated to the Ministry of Finance. From 1 February 1919 to the end of the Estonian War of Independence the borders were guarded by the military. Since 15 February 1919 until May 1921 the crossing of borders was checked by the Republic's Border Control Government (Estonian: Vabariigi Piirikontrolli Valitsus). On 30 May 1922, the border guard agency was subordinated to the Ministry of the Interior. Following the recommendation of Minister of the Interior, Kaarel Eenpalu, the Border Guard Government (Estonian: Piirivalve Valitsus) (not to be confused with the previous Border Guard government) was established on 20 September 1922. Lieutenant colonel Ants Kurvits was appointed to lead the organization on 1 November 1922, which is also considered the official formation date of the Estonian Border Guard. Lieutenant colonel Arved Engmaa became his deputy.

On 1 December 1922, the Estonian government approved the structure of the agency, consisting of: a headquarters, departments, districts, and cordons. The headquarters started work in January 1923, at the White hall of the Toompea Castle. Positions were manned with reserve officers from the military and conscripts serving under a one-year contract. By May 20, 1923, all control over the border was transferred from the Defence Forces to the border guard. There were eight district stations: Tallinn, Läänemaa, Pärnu, Valga, Petseri, Tartu, Peipsi and Narva. On 1 December 1923, Valga station was joined with Petseri, and on 1 July, Tartu station was joined with Peipsi, and Pärnu was joined with Läänemaa into Lääne station.

On 16 February 1923, a corporation for officers was established. On 16 June 1927, a similar corporation was established for the conscripts. Until the mid-1930s, the legal ground for the activities of the border guard was based on an old law, established under the Russian Empire. On 5 June 1936, a new Border Guard Act was entered into force. Despite legal agreements with the Soviet Union, a tragic incident occurred on 8 February 1938, when Soviet border guards entered Estonian territory and killed two Estonian border guards and one civilian. On the 10th anniversary of the Border Guard, the agency received its flag. In 1940, the agency was partially disbanded by the occupying Soviet Union forces. The eastern border structures were demolished. By then there were roughly 1100 border guards. Large number of Estonian Border Guard officers were repressed and sent to Gulags.

=== Restoration and unification (1990-2010) ===
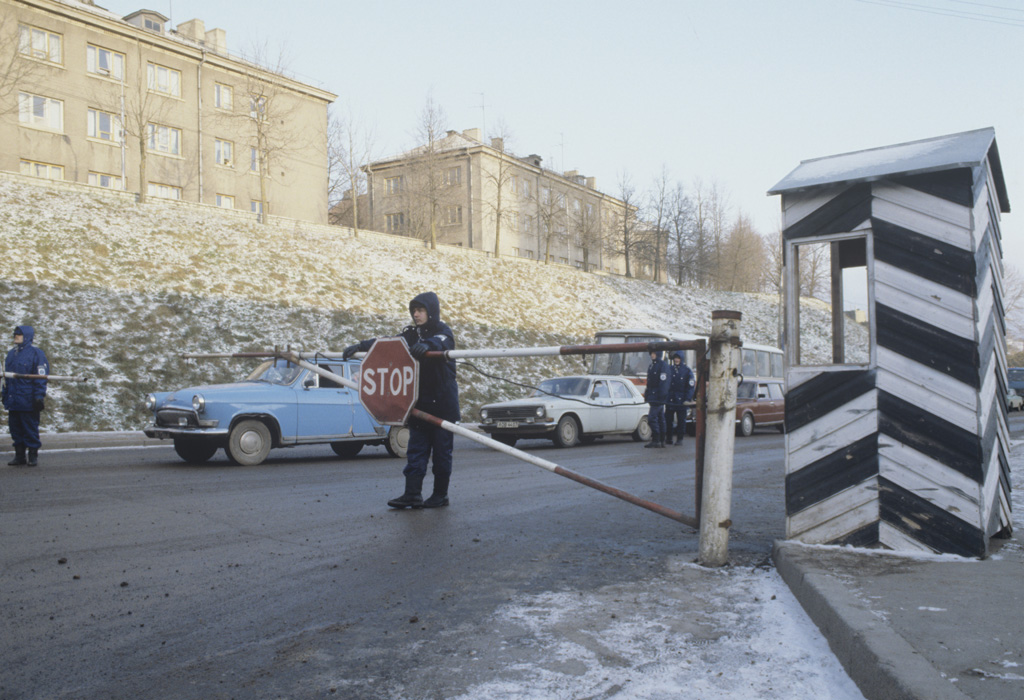
Estonian customs office in Narva during 1991.

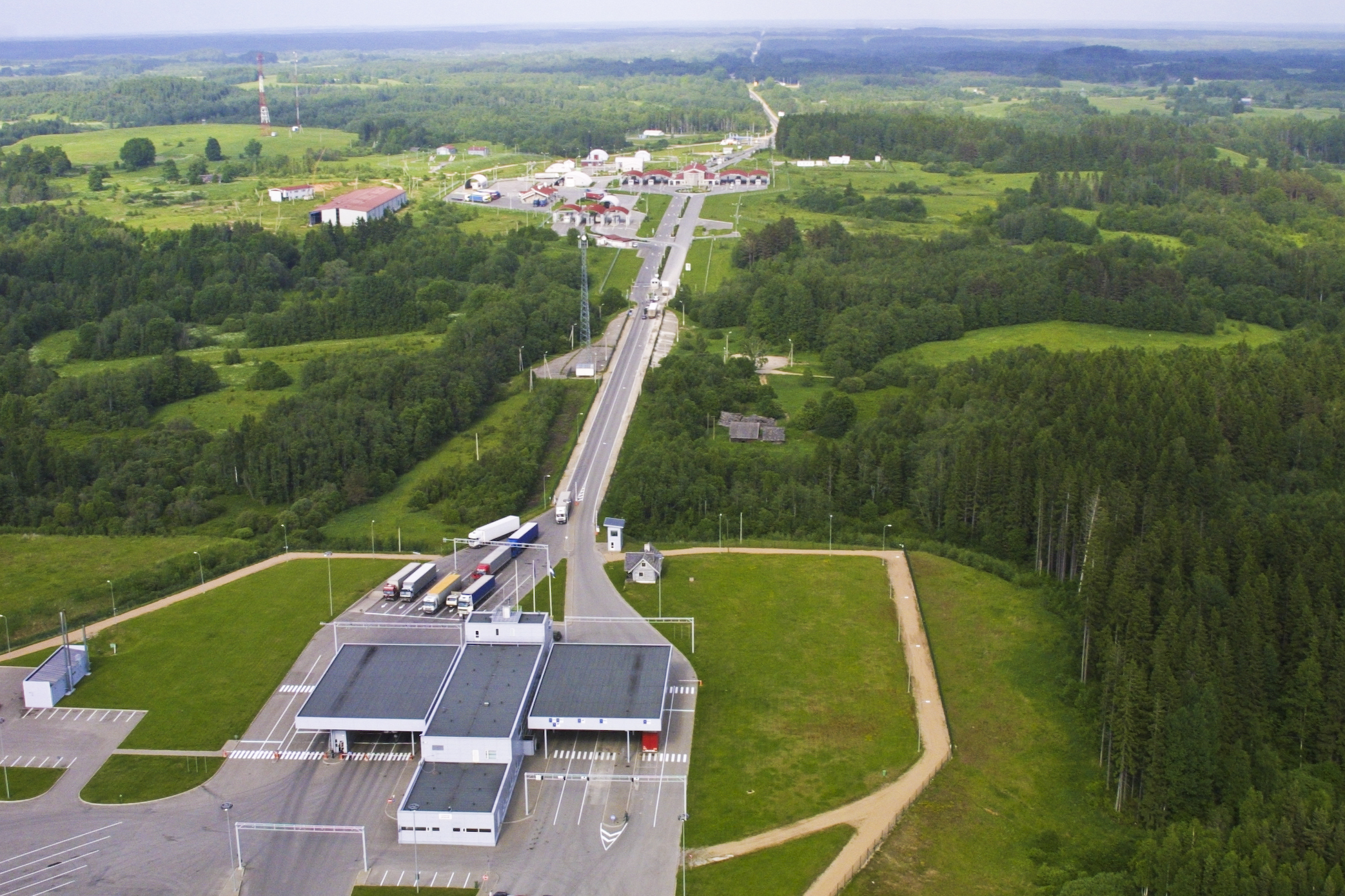
Luhamaa border crossing in 2005.

The restoration of Estonian Border Guard began with the formation of the Estonian Home Defence (Estonian: Eesti Kodukaitse), a volunteer organization, created in response to the attack on Toompea by the Intermovement on 15 May 1990. The guarding of borders was organized with volunteers. The situation with borders was dire - the border was unmarked, there was no communication equipment nor transport, not to mention work and living spaces. Furthermore, Soviet troops were still residing in Estonia.

On 20 September 1990, the Minister of State Raivo Vare formed a commission, which was tasked with establishing control over Estonian borders. On October 1, training of future border guards began. On 15 October, an economic border defence service was established inside the Home Defence organization. An act regarding the economic border of Estonia was passed on 22 October and checkpoints began work three days later.

The restoration date of the Estonian Border Guard is considered to be November 1, 1990, when the government approved 27 permanent checkpoints. On 15 September, Remniku Training Center began operating in Ida-Virumaa, with Johan Saar appointed to head it. The Estonian National Border Guard Board (Estonian: Eesti Riiklik Piirikaitseamet) was formed on April 8, 1991. During that period, the situation on the southern border was tense because Riga's OMON continuously assaulted Estonian checkpoints. On 15 November, border control was established on highway checkpoints, railway crossings, trains, harbours and airports. On 28 February 1992, the institution was reformed into the Estonian Border Guard (Estonian: Eesti Piirivalveamet), under the control of the Ministry of the Interior. On March 9, the Border Guard College began work. On 1 July 1992, a visa regime was established on the border. On November 1, 1992, the organization received its former flag.

On November 16, 1992, the Finnish Border Guard donated the first three ships (PVL-100, PVL-101, PVL-102) to the naval department. In 1993, the National Border Guard Squadron was established, which began operating with two L-410 airplanes donated by Germany (these left service in 2017 and 2018). These were later supplemented with four Mil Mi-8 helicopters (all left service by 2009). In June 1993, Tarmo Kõuts became the head of the organization and the corporation for officers was re-established. In 2000, colonel Harry Hein became the next head of the organization. During that time, employment of conscripts for border control duties ceased and the organization transitioned to a fully professional staff.

After Estonia joined the EU and NATO, the border guard went through a reform, establishing the Schengen Area in Estonia. In 2005, lieutenant colonel Roland Peets became the head of the organization. Estonia officially joined the Schengen Area on 21 December 2007. On January 1, 2010, the Estonian Border Guard was joined with the Estonian Police to form a new unified organization called the Police and Border Guard Board. The organizations duties were taken over by the Border Guard Board subdivision.

== See also ==
- Police and Border Guard Aviation Group
- Frontex
- Estonian Police
- Police and Border Guard Board
