= Oskar Amberg =

Estonian politician (1878–1963)

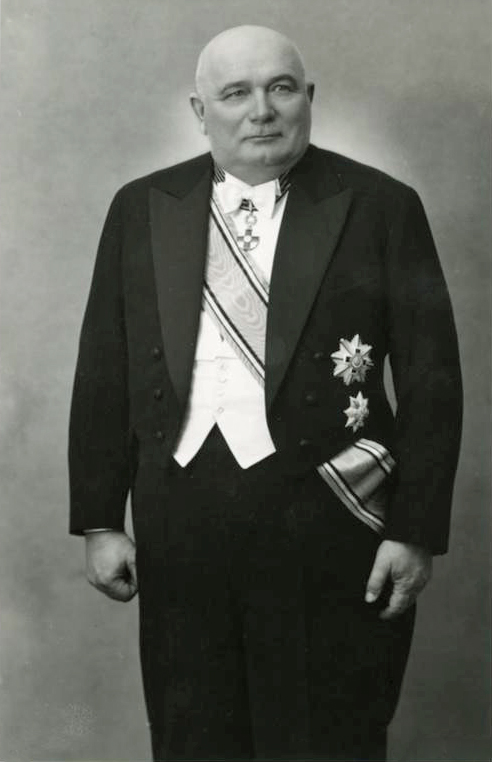
Oskar Amberg in 1930

Oskar Amberg (29 December 1878 – 24 October 1963 Lübeck, West Germany) was an Estonian politician.

Political offices:

- 1923–1924: Minister of Labour and Welfare
- 1924: Minister of War
- 1925–1926: Minister of Roads
