= Raivo Vare =

Estonian economist and politician

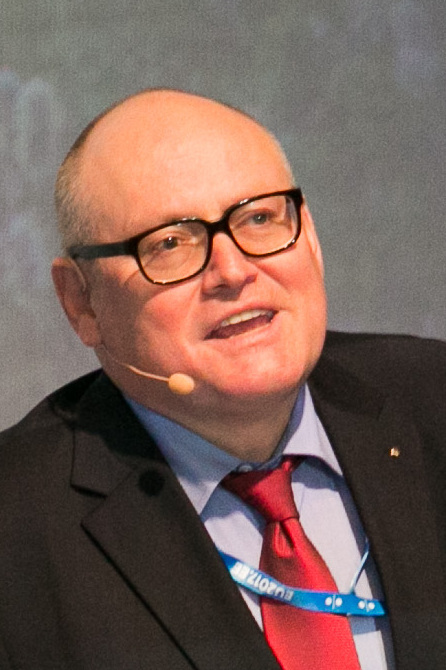
Vare in 2017.

Raivo Vare (born 11 May 1958 in Tallinn) is an Estonian politician, entrepreneur, and transit and economic expert.

== Early life and education ==
In 1980 Vare graduated from Tartu State University with a degree in law.

== Career ==
From 1990 until 1992, Vare served as Minister of State (Estonian: riigiminister). From 1993 until 1996, he was the head of AS Tallinna Pank. From 1996 until 1999, he was Minister of Roads and Communications.

== Other activities ==
- Trilateral Commission, Member of the European Group

== Awards ==
- 2002: Order of the National Coat of Arms, IV class.
- 2006: Order of the National Coat of Arms, II class.
