= Mereküla, Pärnu County =

Village in Estonia

- Village
- Location within Estonia
- Coordinates: 58.2949°N 24.5864°E
- Country: Estonia
- County: Pärnu County
- Parish: Häädemeeste Parish
- Time zone: UTC+2 (EET)
  - Summer (DST): UTC+3 (EEST)

Mereküla is a village in Häädemeeste Parish, Pärnu County in Estonia.
