= Estonian Rescue Services Agency =

Law enforcement agency of Estonia

- Päästeamet
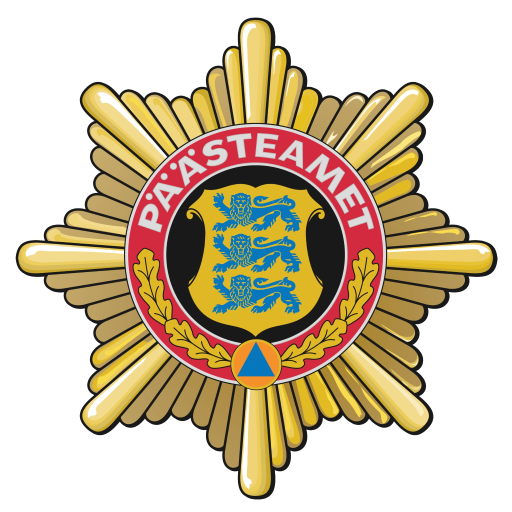

Agency overview
- Formed: 25 May 1992
- Jurisdiction: Government of Estonia
- Headquarters: Raua 2, Tallinn; 59°26′6.82″N 24°45′50.15″E
- Agency executive: Kuno Tammearu, Director General
- Parent agency: Ministry of the Interior
- Child agency: Estonian Firefighting Museum
- Website: www.rescue.ee

The Estonian Rescue Services Agency (Estonian: Päästeamet; formerly also known as the Estonian Rescue Board) is a government agency under the Ministry of the Interior of Estonia. It is tasked with maintaining a secure environment in Estonia, anticipating threats and helping people in the event of an accident. Its mission is to prevent accidents, save lives, property, and the environment. The organization provides a large number of services, including emergency response, firefighting, oil pollution removal, explosive ordnance disposal, chemical and radiation hazard elimination, water rescue etc.

== History ==
The predecessors of the Rescue Services Agency were the Firefighting Administration under the Ministry of Internal Affairs of the Soviet Union, which was renamed the Fire Fighting Board of the Ministry of the Interior in 1990, and a separate civil defence organization. On September 10, 1991, the Civil Defence Staff was reformed into the National Rescue Board of the Republic of Estonia. The organization was officially established on May 25, 1992, with the liquidation of the State Fire Service Board and transferral of resources and tasks to the National Rescue Board. This move combined civil protection, firefighting and rescue operations under the domain of one organization. The establishment of the new organization was supported by new legislation in the form of the Civil Protection Act in 1992, and the Rescue Act of the Republic of Estonia in 1994. In 2012, the organization was restructured. The Alarm Center became an independent government agency and regional rescue centers were merged under the unified management of the Estonian Rescue Services Agency.

== Structure ==
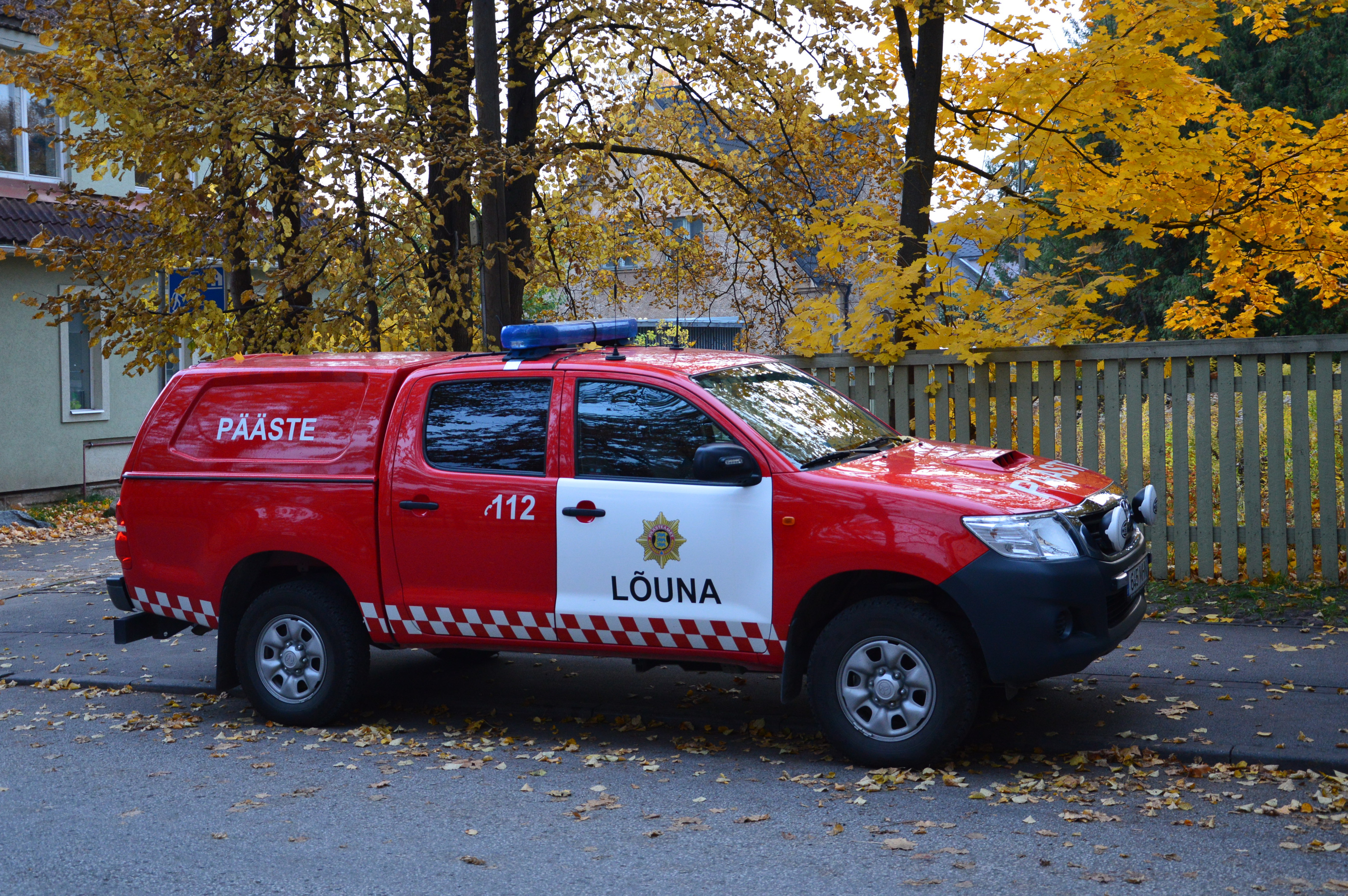
Car from South Estonian division of Estonian Rescue Board in Tartu.

The Estonian Rescue Services Agency is led by a Director General, who is supported by Deputy Director Generals. The Deputy Director Generals help in leading the various departments of the Rescue Services Agency, which develop, plan, manage and implement the activities of rescue centers. These departments include: emergency management department, rescue work department, explosive ordnance disposal ("EOD"), prevention department, safety supervision department, administrative department, human resource department, development department, legal department, finance department, communications department, and the Estonian Firefighting Museum. The Director General oversees the work of rescue centres. There are four rescue centers: North, South, East and West Regional Rescue Center. The rescue centers have various bureaus, which include the prevention bureau, safety supervision bureau, and preparedness bureau. Rescue centers also govern rescue regions, consisting of rescue brigades and stand-by groups. There are 72 national rescue brigades, 119 voluntary rescue brigades, and 4 EOD squads.

== See also ==
- Estonian Firefighting Museum
- Estonian Voluntary Rescue Association
- Vabatahtlik Reservpäästerühm
- Police and Border Guard Board
- IT and Development Centre. Ministry of the Interior, Estonia
