= Baltic Workboats =

Estonian shipbuilding company

Baltic Workboats AS
- Formerly: Saare Töölaevad AS
- Type: Public limited company
- Industry: Shipbuilding
- Founded: 1967
- Headquarters: Nasva, Saaremaa, Estonia
- Area served: Europe, Middle East, Americas
- Key people: Margus Vanaselja (CEO)
- Products: Workboats, patrol boats, pilot boats, ferries, tugboats
- Number of employees: 191 (2024)
- Subsidiaries: Baltic Workboats US
- Website: bwb.ee

Baltic Workboats AS is an Estonian shipbuilding company specialising in aluminium and steel workboats, including patrol vessels, pilot boats, ferries and other special-purpose craft. The company operates a shipyard at Nasva on the island of Saaremaa and has a subsidiary, Baltic Workboats US, in Tampa, Florida, serving the North American market. Baltic Workboats has delivered more than 250 vessels to customers in over 20 countries worldwide.

The company is known for its patented wave-piercing hull design and has been involved in several high-profile international contracts, including patrol vessels for the Royal Oman Police and projects funded by the European Defence Fund.

== History ==
=== Origins as a repair yard (1967–1990s) ===
The origins of the shipyard date back to 1967, when a small repair facility with a harbour and slipway was established in Nasva, on Saaremaa island, then part of the Estonian SSR. The yard initially focused on repairing and maintaining small vessels operating in the Baltic Sea.

=== Privatization and new ownership (1998–2004) ===
Following Estonia’s transition to a market economy, the yard was reorganised and came under new private ownership in the late 1990s. A programme of modernisation was undertaken, including construction of new production halls and the introduction of contemporary shipbuilding technologies.

In 2000 the company was registered under the name Aktsiaselts Saare Töölaevad ("Saare Workboats JSC"). In 2004 it adopted its present name, Baltic Workboats AS.

During this period the yard moved from repair work into building new aluminium workboats. Early projects included pilot boats for Estonian Pilot and other regional operators.

=== Expansion into series-built workboats (2000s) ===
In the 2000s Baltic Workboats expanded its portfolio of aluminium pilot and patrol boats and began exporting to neighbouring countries. The company developed series of fast patrol vessels and medium-sized workboats for pilotage, law-enforcement and harbour operations.

The company also started collaborating with international naval architects, including on catamaran designs, and gradually increased the length and complexity of vessels it produced.

=== Ferries and larger vessels (2010s) ===
From the 2010s, Baltic Workboats moved into building larger vessels, including double-ended car ferries and patrol vessels for foreign coast guards and navies. In 2015–2016 the company delivered the 45-metre ice-class double-ended ferry Ormsö for service between the Estonian mainland and the island of Vormsi.

The yard also supplied 26.5-metre patrol vessels to the Swedish Coast Guard and later delivered patrol craft to the Estonian Navy and other government customers.

In 2019 Baltic Workboats won a contract valued at around €50 million to build 14 patrol vessels for the Royal Oman Police Coast Guard, to be delivered over a four-year period.

=== Recent developments (2020s) ===
In the 2020s the company has increasingly focused on hybrid and alternative-fuel solutions, including vessels using hydrogen, biogas and battery systems, reflecting wider trends in low-emission shipping.

Baltic Workboats has been selected to build a 45-metre semi-autonomous surface vessel as part of the EUROGUARD project, one of the larger initiatives funded by the European Defence Fund. Construction of the vessel began in Nasva in 2025.

In June 2025 Baltic Workboats and the Estonian industrial group BLRT signed a contract worth approximately €55 million with the Belgian government for the construction of vessels, further expanding the company’s Western European footprint.

Also in the mid-2020s Baltic Workboats and Finnish shipbuilder Työvene Oy announced the creation of Nordic Yards Group, a joint shipbuilding group intended to combine capabilities at Nasva and Uusikaupunki for vessels up to 120 metres in length.

== Operations ==
=== Shipyards and facilities ===
Baltic Workboats’ main yard is located at Nasva harbour, near Kuressaare, on the island of Saaremaa in Estonia. The facility includes production halls for aluminium and steel construction, outfitting workshops, launching infrastructure and a harbour area that is periodically dredged to maintain depth for vessel construction and trials.

Baltic Workboats US, based in Tampa, Florida, acts as a design, sales and service hub for the North American market, adapting Baltic Workboats designs to local regulatory requirements and operational needs.

=== Workforce ===
The company employs around 190–200 people. In 2024 Baltic Workboats reported 191 employees. The workforce includes welders, engineers, naval architects and support staff.

=== Financials ===
According to Estonian business information services, Baltic Workboats generated sales revenue of about €51.9 million in 2024 and an operating profit of about €2 million. Earlier data indicate consistent revenue growth during the mid-2010s, with turnover above €30 million by 2017.

== Products ==
Baltic Workboats designs and builds a range of vessels, typically between about 15 and 60 metres in length, constructed in aluminium or steel. Core product groups include:

- Pilot boats – including the PILOT 17 WP and other wave-piercing hull designs used in Northern European pilotage operations.
- Patrol boats and fast response vessels – such as 24-metre and 26.5-metre patrol boats in service with border guards and police in the Baltic region and elsewhere.
- Ferries – including double-ended ice-class car and passenger ferries serving Estonian island routes, such as Ormsö.
- Workboats and special-purpose vessels – harbour workboats, tugboats and research or survey vessels for government and commercial operators.

Many of the company’s designs employ a proprietary wave-piercing bow intended to improve seakeeping and crew comfort at higher speeds in rough conditions. In recent years Baltic Workboats has also developed hybrid and alternative-fuel propulsion solutions, including vessels using batteries, hydrogen and biogas.

== Major contracts and customers ==
Baltic Workboats’ customers include government agencies, port authorities and private operators. Notable contracts include:

- Construction of pilot and patrol boats for the Estonian Police and Border Guard Board and the Swedish Coast Guard.
- Delivery of 45-metre double-ended car ferry Ormsö for the Estonian island route between Rohuküla and Vormsi.
- A contract with the Royal Oman Police Coast Guard for 14 patrol vessels, valued at around €50 million, signed in 2019.
- Participation as lead builder in the EUROGUARD project to construct a 45-metre semi-autonomous surface vessel under the European Defence Fund.
- A contract in cooperation with BLRT Group to build vessels for the Belgian government, valued at approximately €55 million.

== Ownership and management ==
Baltic Workboats AS is an Estonian-owned public limited company. According to Estonian business publications, its management board has included members such as Margus Vanaselja (CEO), Märten Vaikmaa, Ahto Pärl, Jüri Taal and Erik Aleksejev.

== See also ==
- Shipbuilding in Estonia
- List of shipbuilders and shipyards
