= Police and Border Guard Board =

Estonian governmental agency

Police and Border Guard Board Politsei- ja Piirivalveamet
- Coat of arms

- Racing stripe

Agency overview
- Formed: 1 January 2010
- Preceding agencies: Estonian Police; Estonian Border Guard

Jurisdictional structure
- Operations jurisdiction: Estonia
- General nature: Civilian police
- Specialist jurisdiction: National border patrol, security, integrity

Operational structure
- Headquarters: Pärnu mnt 139, Tallinn
- 59°24′31.67″N 24°44′12.91″E
- Elected officer responsible: Lauri Läänemets, Minister of Interior
- Agency executive: Egert Belitšev, Director General
- Parent agency: Ministry of the Interior

Website
- www.politsei.ee

The Police and Border Guard Board (Estonian: Politsei- ja Piirivalveamet) is a unified national governmental agency within the Estonian Ministry of Interior and is responsible for law enforcement and internal security in the Republic of Estonia.

The main tasks of the agency are to ensure and protect the integrity of the Estonian state and, since 1 May 2004, also the European Union border within the territories of the Republic of Estonia; to secure the state borders and the European Union outer border within the territories of the Republic of Estonia, to monitor and identify citizenship, along with handling the documentation, to preserve law and civil order within the borders of the Republic of Estonia and to detect and prevent crime.

== History ==
Andrus Ansip's Government Cabinet which was established after the 2005 parliamentary elections, stated in its 2007–2011 coalition programme the need for a unified homeland security agency in order to reduce operating costs and upkeep between the ministry and its organizations. On 13 April 2007, the Ministry of the Interior established a working group in order commence research about possible unification of the Estonian Police and Estonian Border Guard agencies.

The final study presented by the working group proposed to unite three main law enforcement organizations, including the Police, Border Guard, and the Citizenship and Migration Board into a single structure capable of carrying out all the tasks. In October 2007, the Ministry of the Interior created another working group with an operational task to start the unification process. On 31 August 2008, the Cabinet approved the creation of a new government organization within the Ministry of the Interior with the unification of these three agencies.

On 6 May 2009, the Estonian Parliament recognized the agency unification idea with the adoption of the Police and Border Guard Board Law, and changes into other laws regarding the area of competency of the Ministry. In June, the Cabinet appointed Raivo Küüt to be the first director-general of the organization. On 1 January 2010, the Police and Border Guard Board officially started work.

== Structure ==
The agency is headed by a director general, who has four deputies. The deputies lead various departments. In addition, prefectures are led by prefects. The Police and Border Guard consists of the Development Department, Border Guard Department, Central Criminal Police, Northern Prefecture, Eastern Prefecture, Southern Prefecture, Western Prefecture, Administration, Internal Affairs Office, and Internal Audit Office. The Border Guard Department also manages the Police and Border Guard Aviation Group and the watercraft (also hovercraft) in service of the Police and Border Guard Board.

== Personnel ==
The organization has more than 7,000 servicemen, of which 6,000 are in active duty, and another 1,000 in the administrative area.

=== Ranks ===
The head of the Police Board is the Director General of Police (peadirektor). The head of the regional district is the Police Commissioner (prefekt). With the unification of the Police and Border Guard Boards several new service ranks were created which now also includes the ranks of general and an inspector general.

#	Ranks of the Police and Border Guard	Translation	Ranks of Maritime Border Guard	Ranks of Estonian Internal Security Service
1.	Politseikindral	Police General	-	Politseikindral
2.	Politseikindralinspektor	Inspector General of Police	-	Politseikindralinspektor
3.	Politseikolonel	Police Colonel	-	Politseikolonel
4.	Politseikolonelleitnant	Police Lieutenant Colonel	-	Politseikolonelleitnant
5.	Politseimajor	Police Major	Politseimajor	Politseimajor
6.	Politseikapten	Police Captain	Politseikapten	Politseikapten
7.	Politseileitnant	Police Lieutenant	Politseileitnant	Politseileitnant
8.	Vanemkommissar	Senior Superintendent	Vanemkommissar	Vanemkommissar
9.	Kommissar	Superintendent	-	Kommissar
10.	Ülemkonstaabel/Üleminspektor	Head Constable; Head Inspector	Ülemveebel; Vanemveebel	Ülemassistent
11.	Vanemkonstaabel; Vaneminspektor	Senior Constable; Senior Inspector	Veebel	Vanemassistent
12.	Konstaabel/Inspektor	Constable; Inspector	Vanemmadrus	Assistant
13.	Nooremkonstaabel	Junior Constable; Junior Inspector	-	Nooremassistent
14.	Politseikadett	Police Cadet	-	Politseikadett

=== Officers ===
	General officers		Senior officers			Junior officers
Police and Border Guard Board
Police and Border Guard Board	Police general (Politseikindral)	Inspector general of police (Politseikindralinspektor)	Police colonel (Politseikolonel)	Police lieutenant colonel (Politseikolonelleitnant)	Police major (Politseimajor)	Police captain (Politseikapten)	Police lieutenant (Politseileitnant)	Senior superintendent (Vanemkomissar)	Superintendent (Komissar)

=== Others ===
	Constables
Police and Border Guard Board
Police and Border Guard Board	head constable, head inspector (Ülemkonstaabel, üleminspektor)	Senior constable, senior inspector (Vanemkonstaabel, vaneminspektor)	Constable, inspector (Konstaabel, inspektor)	Junior constable, junior inspector (Nooremkonstaabel, nooreminspektor)
Internal Security Service ranks	Chief assistant (Ülemassistent)	Senior assistant (Vanemassistent)	Assistant (Assistent)	Junior assistant (Nooremassistent)

== Equipment ==
=== Firearms ===
Model	Origin	Type	References
Glock 19	Austria	Semi-automatic pistol	
Walther P99	Germany	Semi-automatic pistol	
LMT R-20 Rahe	United States	Assault rifle	
C-90 Instalaza	Spain	Rocket Propelled Grenade	

=== Aircraft ===
The Police and Border Guard Aviation Group operates fixed and rotary-wing aircraft for the Police and Border Guard Board. In total, they operate three helicopters and two airplanes. One of the airplanes is equipped for maritime patrol and pollution detection duties. Police and Border Guard Aviation Group is stationed at Tallinn Airport and Kuressaare Airport.

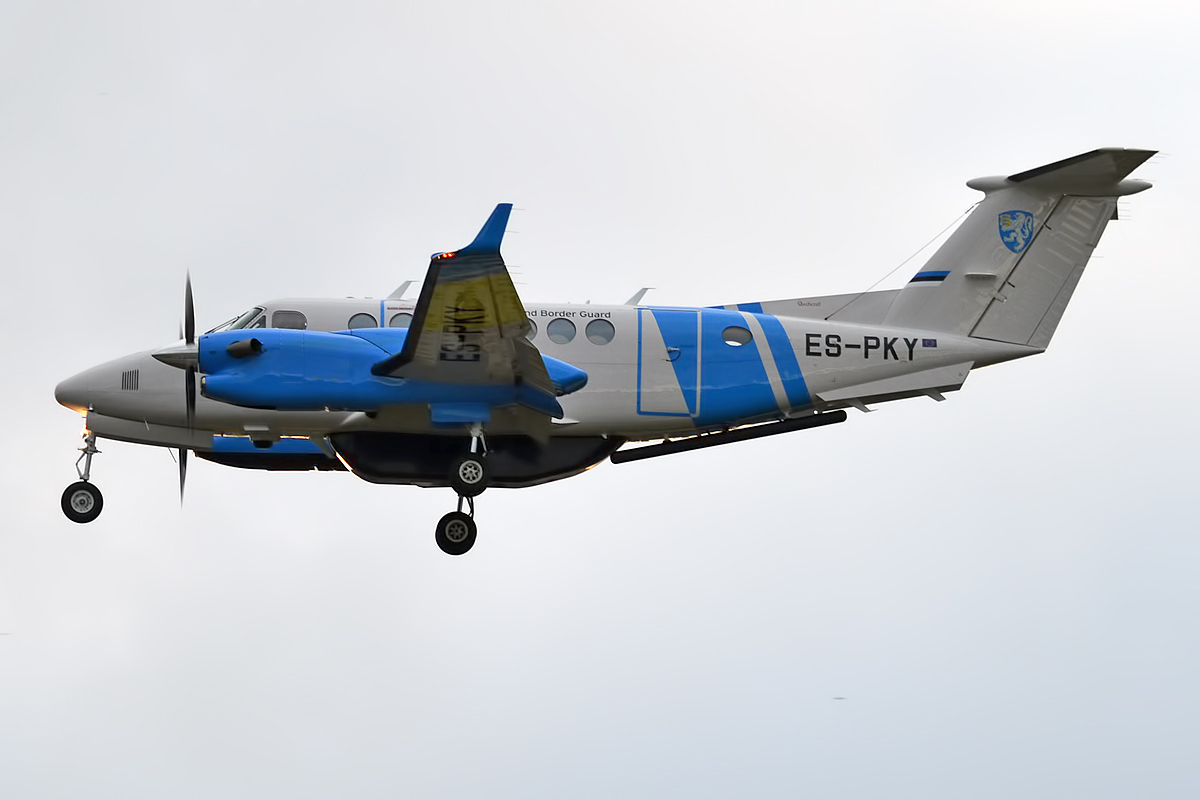
Beech King Air 350

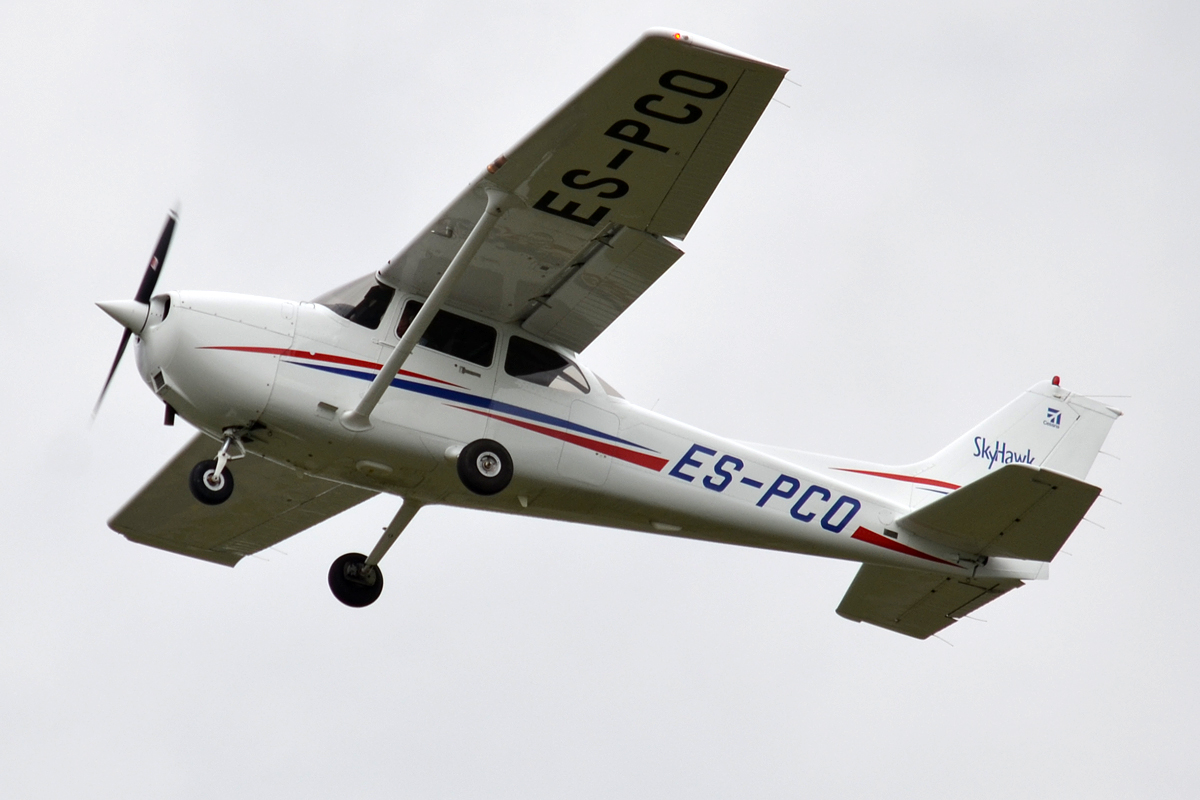
Cessna 172

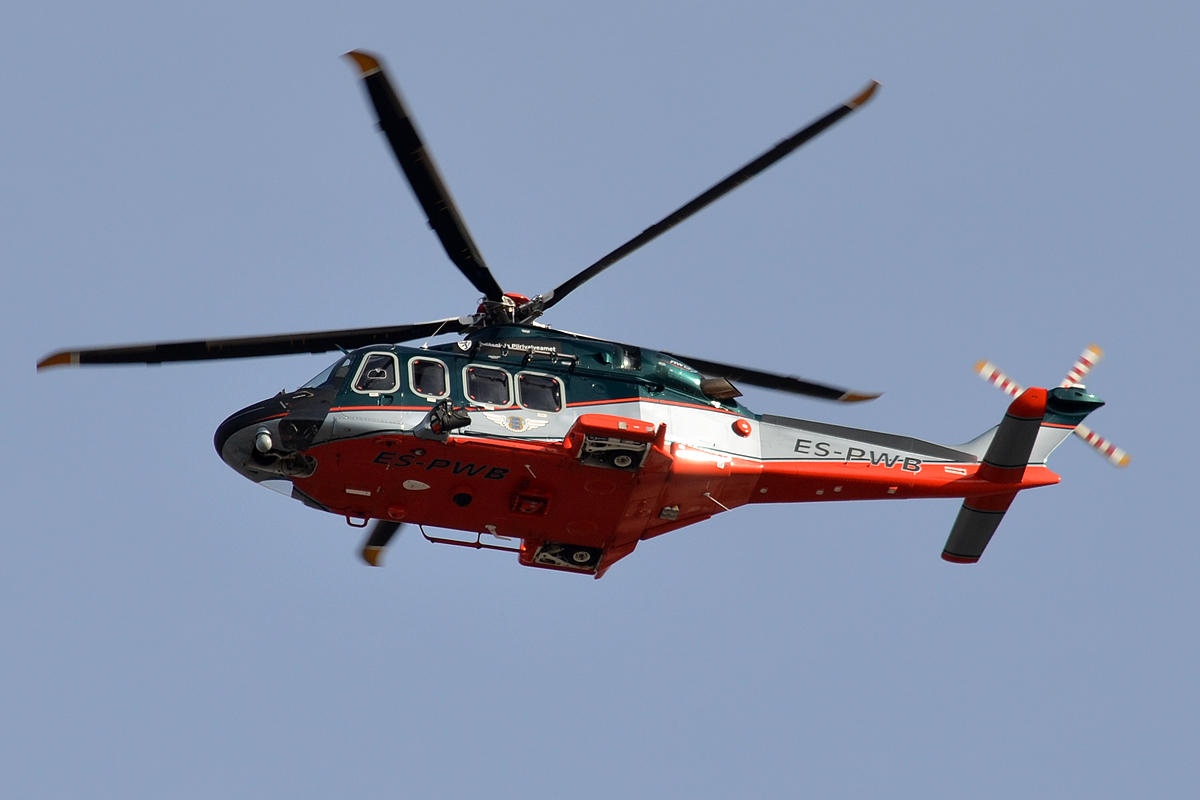
AgustaWestland AW139

=== Naval fleet ===
In 2023 the Naval Fleet of the Police and Border Guard Board was merged with the Estonian Navy, meaning that the Police and Border Guard Board transferred its four sizeable sea-going vessels, the Kindral Kurvits, the EML Pikker, the EML Valve, and the Raju, to Estonian Navy and retained only some smaller boats and also 3 hovercraft. As a result, the Police and Border Guard Board only operates small vessels and 3 hovercraft.

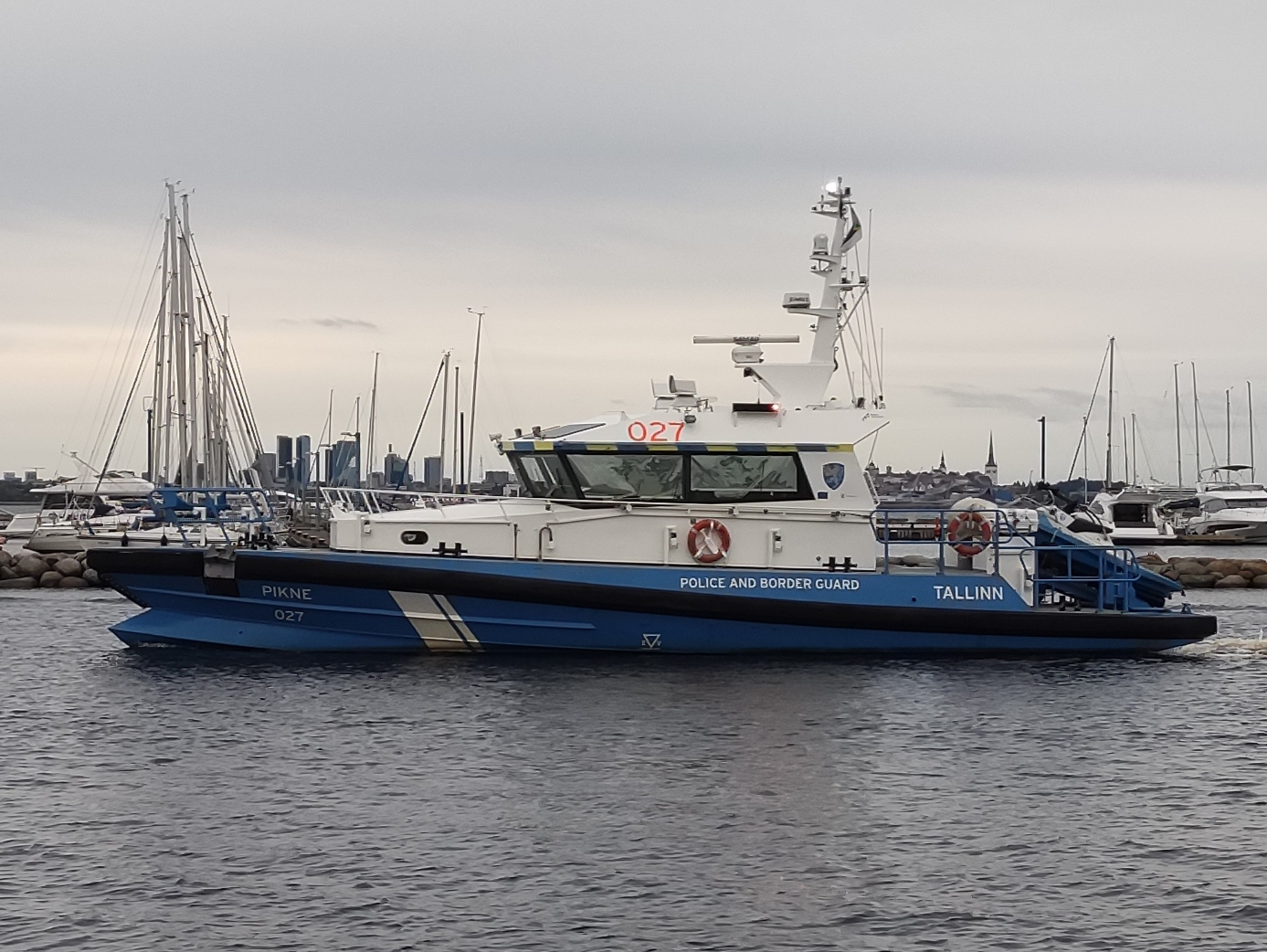
Patrol Vessel Pikne (027)

- Patrol vessels
  - Udria (026)
  - Pikne (027)
  - Rahu (028)
  - Tuule (M-06)
  - Terje (M-07)
  - Kessu (M-10)

In March 2026, an Estonian Border Guard vessel, the motorboat M-80, sunk in Greece while on a Frontex mission.

== Insignia ==
=== Police coat of arms ===
The coat of arms of the police is in the shape of a shield. On a blue background is a silver lion standing on its rear legs, holding a small coat of arms with its paws, which represents readiness to protect public order and the interests of the state. The lion was chosen as a symbol because it represents nobility and courage and because it is also represented on the national coat of arms. The silver color symbolizes nobility and masculinity, while the blue color symbolizes peace and stability. The coat of arms was designed based on historical traditions and the design of the Estonian police badge from the 1930s.

=== Border Guard insignia ===
The insignia of the Estonian Border Guard was designed by Günther Reindorff for the 10th anniversary of the Border Guard in 1932. It depicts a silver eagle holding a sword in front of a border post. The eagle is called the North Eagle, which originates from the national epic Kalevipoeg, and it symbolizes vigilance, courage and readiness to fight. The border post is stylized in diagonally placed national colors and it holds the national coat of arms at the top. The eagle and border post are surrounded by a wreath of silver oak leaves, which symbolizes unity and manliness. There is a silver ribbon with the date of establishment of the Estonian Border Guard on the lower part of insignia.

=== Flag ===
The main color of the Police and Border Guard flag is blue, which is also one of the colors of the national flag. On the agency board the blue symbolises peace and stability. The main figure on the flag is a white standing lion holding a national small coat of arms with its paws. The lions tongue and claws are red. The flag design is based on the Estonian police coat of arms. The length and width ratio of the festive parade flag is 7:9 and the size of the flag is 105x135 cm.

Police coat of arms

Border Guard insignia

Flag

Racing stripe

== See also ==
- Estonian Police
- Estonian Border Guard
- Estonian Rescue Board
- Estonian Internal Security Service
- IT and Development Centre. Ministry of the Interior, Estonia
- Crime in Estonia
