= List of industrial buildings in Greater Copenhagen =

This list of industrial buildings in Greater Copenhagen lists industrial buildings in Copenhagen, Denmark.

== Copenhagen ==
=== Inner City ===
Location	Image	Origins	Current use
Bryggernes Plads 7		Carlsberg building.	Hotel Ottilia.
Bryggernes Plads 7		Carlsberg building.	Hotel Ottilia.
Bredgade 84–86		Royal Danish Silk Manufactury from 1756. The rear wings and the building at No.36 are not listed.	
Dronningensgade 77		Nielsen & Jensen biscuit and cake factory constructed in 1898.	
J. C. Jacobsens Gade		Carlsberg warehouse and worjkshop from 1883.	In 2020-22, Rød Lagerbygning was adapted for use as an office building to designs by Årstiderne/Sweco.
Langebrogade 6		J. Wiedemann and Steff sausage factory 1906–1907.	The buildings have been converted into offices.
Pilestræde 34		Berlingske printing building designed by Bent Helweg-Møller.	
Store Kongensgade 23B		Former silver factory constructed for Bernhard Hertz in 1887	In 2009, Store Kongensgade 23B was converted into residential apartments.
Studiestræde 54		Copenhagen Waterworks: Denmark's first industrial waterworks, completed in 1859 to designs by Niels Sigfred Nebelong.	The music venue Pumpehuset is based in one of the buildings. The other buildings have been converted into a daycare.
Tietgensgade 23		The Western Power Station constructed in 1896–09 to designs by Ludvig Fenger.	The building has now been converted into a distant cooling facility.

=== Amager ===
Location	Image	Origins	Current use
Alléen 2-26, Tårnby		Former Kastrup Værk ceramics factory established by Jacob Fortling in the 18th century. The buildings were later operated as a brewery.	The building has been converted into offices.
Amager Boulevard 115		Building constructed for the Royal Mint in 1923 to designs by Martin Borch. It has now been converted into student dwellings.	
Artillerivej		FDB knitwear factory from 1935.	Trikotagen: The building has been converted into office space.
Holmbladsgade 70		Former Sadolin & Holmblad paint factory.	Sadolinparken: The site has bow been redeveloped into a mixed-use neighbourhood with a mixture of new and old buildings.
Holmbladsgade		Former Phillips light bulb factory.	Now operated as a multi-tenant office building under the name Edison.
Jemtlandsgade		Building constructed for Holmblad's oil mill in 1880. It has now been converted into a community centre.	Kvarterhuset Amagerbro
Kigkurren 6-8		Horwitz & Kattentid	
Prags Boulevard 49		Former Toms confectionery factory.	
Reberbanegade 3		Former Jacob Holm & Sønner rope factory.	Amager Center
Snorresgade 20		Former home of International Harbester's Danish subsidiary.	Scan Group headquarters.
Snorresgade 22		Vonstructed for Dansk Tarmimport in 1915. The book printer Hertz Bogtrykkeri was later based in the building.	Show room for the design brand Vipp.
Strandlodsvej 5		Former printing dyes factory from the 1930s. Later used by the Danish Film Institute as a film storing facility.	Filmlageret: converted into youth housing by Spacon & X in 2019-2022.
Strandlodsvej 44		Factory constructed for Dansk Staalmøbelfabrik in 1945–46 to designs by Niels Gotenborg. Valdemar Tørsleff & Co. was a tenant in the building from 1947 and bought it in 1977.	It has now been converted into office space.
Sturlasgade 10		Viking pencil factory from 1924.	The building has now been converted into apartments.

=== Bispebjerg ===
Location	Image	Origins	Current use
Bispevej 4		C. Schou's Factory	
Brofogedvej 10		Andreas Christensen's Piano Factory from 1918	The building is now owned by Johl-Sørensen. It houses the company headquarters and well as a small concert hall and rehearsal facilities for pianists.
Dortheavej 4		Farvergården	
Lygten 7		A cluster of white buildings constructed for the dairy products company Enigheden.	In 2009, it was adapted for use as office space.
Skaffervej 4-6		Blarke & Mahrt	
Glentevej 47			
Rentemestervej 14		Nielsen & Jespersens: Two-storey Functionalist plastic factory from 1934, with a perpendicular extension from 1943 and another extension from 1944. The building was heritage listed in 1997.	
Rentemestervej 25		Julius Winther's Machine Factory	
Rentemestervej 65-67		Scala Sko	
Theklavej 10		Thor's Steam Laundry	

=== Frederiksberg ===
Location	Image	Origins	Current use
Bernhard Bangs Allé 25		Jørgen Petersen & Co.'s Footwear Factory from 1937 to 1938.	It has now been converted into office space.
Finsensvej 6		August Neubert factory from 1897.	
Holger Danskes Vej 28-30		Fishing net factory built in 1922 to designs by t A.S.K. Lauritzen. The facade features a relief of a fishing net with two fish.	The building has been converted into apartments.
Mtivej		Frederiksberg Metalvarefabrik from 1907 designed by Carl Brummer.	It is now known as Miltimediehuset.
Rahbeks Allé 3–11		Rahbeks Allé Brewery from 1860–61 designed by Jens Eckersberg.	The buildings have now been converted into apartments.
Nordre Fasanvej		Novo insulin factory from 1934 with later additions, designed by Arne Jacobsen.	
Nordre Fasanvej		Tobacco factory constructed for Herman Kruge. In 1916, it was acquired by P. Wulff.	
Smallegade		Porcelænsparken: The Royal Copenhagen Porcelain Manufactory's former factory site.	

=== Nørrebro ===
Location	Image	Origins	Current use
Heimdalsgade 14–16		Hintz & Co.'s Chocolate Factory Chokolate factory from 1914.	
Guldbergsgade 29F			Empire Bio
Guldbergsgade 29N			KEA Guldbergsgade
Hamletsgade		Holger Petersen factory.	
Hermodsgade 24		Coffee roaster from 1932 designed by Carl Servais; the building is heritage listed.	
Hørsholmgade 20		Brødrene Cloëtta chocolate factory from 1901.	
Nørrebrogade 45A		Rud. Rasmussen furniture factory. The building complex consisting of a residential wing fronting Nørrebrogade from 1894 to 1895, a four-storey furniture factory wing from 1876 towards Stengade and a longer furniture factory wing with mansard roof from 1911. The building complex was heritage listed in 2008.	
Tagensvej 85C		Holger Petersen's Textile Factory from 1887 to 1888 (heightened 1908) and one-storey dyeing plant from 1883. The building complex was heritage listed in 1990.	
Struenseegade 7-9		Glud & Marstrand building	
Struenseegade 13-15		Københavns Papæskefabrik	

=== Østerbro ===
Location	Image	Coordinates	Current use
Aldersrogade 6		Hellesens Rnke & V. Ludvigsen factory from the 1910s.	
Aldersrogade 8		Johnsen & Johnsen	
Blegdamsvej 60-62		Nielsen & Winther	
Fanøgade 17		Chr. Hansen's Laboratory	
Jagtvej 169		Building originally constructed for Aldersro Brewery. It was later heightened and converted into a cigar factory.	
Jagtvej 175		Galle & Jessen factory.	
Landskronagade 62-7		Wessel & Vetts Dampvæveri	
Orient Plads		Former warehouse.	Pakhus 54
Østre Grunwalds Plads 1, Østerbro		Gasometer constructed for the Eastern Gasworks in 1881–1883 to designs by Martin Nyrop.	The building was converted into a theatre in the 1879s. It was heritage listed in 194.
Oceanvej 1		Tunnelfabrikken	
Øster Allé 6		Eastern Power Station	
Ragnagade 7		Georg Jensen's Silver Smithy	
Rønnegade 7 / Teglværksgade 31		Nordisk Droge & Kemikalie	
Sandkaj 17		Former DÆG silos	
Sundkaj		Former warehouse from 1947.	Pakhus 47
Sundkaj		Former warehouse.	Pakhus 48
Viborggade 70		Building constructed for Københavns Smergelfabrik in 1907 to designs by Anton Rosen.	

=== Valby ===
Location	Image	Origins	Current use
Bomuldsgade 4		Former cotton mill constructed for De Danske Bomuldsspinderier in 1905–07.	Spinderiet. The building has been converted into a shopping centre.
Carl Jacobsensvej 25		Former Københavns Sukkerraffinaderi processing plant from 1913.	The building has now been converted into one of several campuses of Copenhagen Technical College.
Carl Jacobsens Vej		Henkel factory	
Høffdingsvej		De Carlske Fabriker	
Værkstedsvej 8-54		Håndværkerbyen	
Carl Jacobsensvej 16-18		Former Dansk Pressefabrik factory.	Kapselfabrikken
Trekronergade 26		Trekroner Brewery	

=== Vesterbro/Kongens Enghave ===
Location	Image	Origins	Current use
Energiporten 1		H. C. Ørsted Power Station	Still used for its original purpose.
Fiskerihavnsgade 6		Uni scrap building from 1918-29	
Gammel Kongevej 25		Messerschmidt's Tannaery	
Halmtorvet 9-17		The Brown Meat District: Former cattle meat market from 1883 designed by Hans Jørgen Holm and Ludvig Fenger.	
Halmtorvet 19-27		The White Meat District: Functionalist extension of the meat market from 1934 designed by Poul Holsøe.	
Halmtorvet 29		Former chemical factory built for Alfred Benzon.	The building has been converted into apartments.
Scandiagade 8		H. Hennings & Harving	
Vesterbrogade 144		The Bing & Grøndahl factory site.	The building is now operated as serviced offices under the name Bings.
Vesterbrogade 140A		Tvedes Bryggeri	
Vesterbrogade 148		Former iron foundry established by Heinrich Meldahl.	Teatret Sorte Hest

== Suburban Copenhagen ==
=== Gladsaxe Municipality ===
Name	Image	Location	Origins	Current use
Søborg Møbler Factory		Vestergade 73, Odense		
Telefonfabrikken		Telefonvej	Former Telefonfabrikken Automatic telephone factory.	The building was acquired by Gladsaxe Municipality in 2003. In 2015–2020, it was adapted for use as a cultural centre with the assistance of the architectural firm BDP Arkitekter.

=== Greve Municipality ===
Name	Image	Location	Date	Coordinates	Notes	Ref
Håndværkerbyen Greve		Håndværkerbyen og Håndværkervænget, Greve	1960s			

=== Hørsholm Municipality ===
Name	Image	Location	Origins	Current use	Ref
Usserød Textile Factory		Teglværksvej 23, Nivå		Lyngsø Allé 3, Hørsholm	

=== Ishøj Municipality ===
Name	Image	Location	Date	Coordinates	Notes	Ref
Thorsborg Waterworks	Allévej 23, 27 og 33, Ishøj	1906-09				

=== Lyngby-Taarbæk Municipality ===
Name	Image	Location	Origins	Current use	Ref
Dansk Gardin- og Textil-Fabrik					
Brede Works		Algade 2, Gørlev	1913		
Pritzel's Factory		Lyngby Hovedgade 10	1909		
C. Schous Fabriker		Nymøllevej 55			

=== Solrød Municipality ===
Name	Image	Location	Origins	Current use	Notes	Ref
Kagstrup Kalkværker		Højagervej, Karlstrup	1913			

== Surroundings ==
=== Fredensborg ===
Name	Image	Location	Date	Coordinates	Notes	Ref
Nivaagaard Brickworks		Teglværksvej 23, Nivå		Vestergade 73, Odense		

=== Hillerød Municipality ===
Name	Image	Location	Date	Coordinates	Notes	Ref
Elværket		Frederolsgade 11, 3400 Hillerød	1918			
Støberihallen		Nordstensvej 1, 3400 Hillerød	1918			

=== Køge Municipality ===
Name	Image	Location	Origins	Current use	Ref
Codan Gummi		Københavnsvej 104, Køge	1913		
Køge Iron Foundry		Vestergade 29, Køge Køge	1913		
Privatmejeriet Vasebæk		Ågade 1, 4600 Køge	Former dairy from 1930.		

=== Roskilde Municipality ===
Name	Image	Location	Date	Coordinates	Notes	Ref
Maglekilde Machine Factory		Algade 2, Gørlev	1913			
Roskilde Distillery		Møllehusene 5, 4000 Roskilde				
