= List of industrial buildings in Denmark =

The list of industrial buildings in Denmark lists industrial buildings in Denmark. It consists mostly of heritage listed buildings and buildings that have been designated as industrial heritage sites.

== Capital Region of Denmark ==
=== Bornholm ===
Name	Image	Location	Date	Coordinates	Description
Hjorth's Factory		Krystalgade 5, Rønne	1871		
Petersen's Smokehouse		Sverigesvej 9, Allinge	1871		
Rønne Power Station		Lille Madsegade 32-34, Rønne	1925-38		
Stenbrudsgården		Krystalgade 5, Rønne	1871		

== Region Zealand ==
For the municipalities of Greve, Køge, Lekre, Roskilde and Solrød, se List of industrial buildings in Greater Copenhagen

=== Faxe Municipality ===
Name	Image	Location	Date	Coordinates	Description
Fakse Kalkbrud		Hovedgaden 13, Faxe			

=== Guldborgsund Municipality ===
Name	Image	Location	Date	Coordinates	Description
Bøtø Nor Pumping Station		Møllesøvej 2, 4873 Væggerløse	1871		
Slagtehuset		Sydhavnsgade 1, Nykøbing			

=== Holbæk Municipality ===
Name	Image	Location	Date	Coordinates	Description
Audebo Pumping Station		Lundemarksvej 22, Holbæk	1875		
Holbæk Iron Foundry		Lundemarksvej 22, Holbæk	1918-		
Holbæk Shipyard		Havnevej 7, Holbæk	1938		
Knabstrup Brickworks and Ceramics Factory		Teglværksvej 30, Knabstrup	1938		

=== Kalundborg Municipality ===
Name	Image	Location	Date	Coordinates	Description
Gørlev Sukkerfabrik		Algade 2, Gørlev	1913		

=== Lolland Municipality ===
Name	Image	Location	Date	Coordinates	Description
Højbygaard Sugar Factory		Fabriksvej 2, Holeby			
Holeby Dieselmotor Fabrik		Østervej 2, Holeby	1902-05		
Nakskov Shipyard		Skibsværftsvej 4, Nakskov			
OTA Factory		Gasvej 3, Nakskov			

=== Næstved Municipality ===
Name	Image	Location	Date	Coordinates	Description
Holmegaard Glass Factory		Glasværksvej 54, Fensmark			
Kähler Ceramics Factory		Glasværksvej 54, Fensmark			

=== Slagelse Municipality ===
Name	Image	Location	Date	Coordinates	Description
Basnæs Cikorietørreriet		Basnæsvej 201, Skælskør			
Skælskør Steam Mill		Algade 2, Gørlev	1853	Vestergade 1, Skælskør	

=== Stevns Municipality ===
Name	Image	Location	Date	Coordinates	Description
Bjælkerup Jernstøberi		Kirkeskovvej 4, Store Heddinge	1913		

=== Vordingborg Municipality ===
Name	Image	Location	Date	Coordinates	Description
Mern Saftstation		Gammel Præstøvej 9, Mern	1913		
Præstø Iron Foundry		Adelgade 20, Præstø	1887		
Stege Sugar Factory		Kostervej 2-6, Stege	1884-		

== Funen ==
=== Assens Municipality ===
Name	Image	Location	Date	Coordinates	Description
Naarup Savværk					

=== Faaborg-Midtfyn Municipality ===
Name	Image	Location	Date	Coordinates	Description
Fabers Fabrikker		Ryslinge			

=== Odense Municipality ===
Name	Image	Location	Description
Brandts Klædefabrik		Vestergade 73, Odense	
Dæhnfeldt Seniorboliger			Frøfirmaet Dæhnfeldt seed silo. The building was converted into dwellings for senior citizens in 1999-2000.
Dalum Papirfabrik		Dalum	

=== Svendborg Municipality ===
Name	Image	Location	Date	Coordinates	Description
Svendborg Skibsværft		Frederiksø, Svendborg			

== South Jutland ==
=== Esbjerg Municipality ===
Name	Image	Location	Date	Coordinates	Description
Ribe Cotton Factories		Torvet 13-15, Ribe			
Ribe Iron Foundry		Saltgade 11, Ribe			

=== Kolding Municipality ===
Name	Image	Location	Date	Coordinates	Description
Konstantin Hansen & Schrøder´s Machine Factory		Låsbygade 48, Kolding	1894		

=== Tønder Municipality ===
Location	Image	Origins	Current use
Bonevoksfabrikken		Højer	Former vax factory adapted by ARKKON Arkitekter in 2015-2016.
Skærbæk Uldspinderi		Kirkevej 13, Skærbæk	

=== Varde Municipality ===
Name	Image	Location	Date	Coordinates	Description
Hjedding Dairy		Hjeddingvej 2, Ølgod	1882		Denmark's first cooperative dairy.
Karlsgårdeværket		Karlsgårdevej 64	1919-21		
Lydum Mølle		Åvej 21, Lydum, Nr. Nebel			

=== Vejle Municipality ===
Name	Image	Location	Date	Coordinates	Description
Th. Wittrups Uldvare & Tæppefabrik		Grejsdalsvej 230, Vejle			

=== Vejen Municipality ===
Name	Image	Location	Date	Coordinates	Description
Alfa factory					Former Alfa margarine factory.

== Central Jutland ==
=== Aarhus Municipality ===
Name	Image	Location	Date	Coordinates	Notes	Ref
Elvirasminde		Klostergade 32-34, Aarhus	1912			
Frichs		Søren Frichs Vej 36-42, Åbyhøj				

=== Horsens Municipality ===
Name	Image	Location	Date	Coordinates	Notes	Ref
Bastian		Emil Møllers Gade 41, Horsens	1874-85			

=== Syddjurs Municipality ===
Name	Image	Location	Date	Coordinates	Description
Maltfabrikken	Adelgade 39-41A, Ebeltoft	1861			

== North Jutland ==
=== Aalborg Municipality ===
Name	Image	Location	Date	Coordinates	Description
C. W. Obel's Tobacco Factory	1898	Strandvejen			

=== Brønderslev Municipality ===
Name	Image	Location	Date	Coordinates	Description
Brødrene Larsens Jernstøberi og Maskinfabrik		Havnegade 39, Asaa			
Pedershaab Maskinfabrik		Nørregade 25, Brønderslev			Company founded in 1877. The oldest surviving building is from 1899.

=== Frederikshavn Municipality ===
Name	Image	Location	Date	Coordinates	Description
Frederikshavn Shipyard		Havnepladsen 12, Frederikshavn	1768		Former shipyard founded in 1913. The surviving buildings date from 1917–18. The premises are now operated as a business parl.
Østvendsyssels Andelssvineslagteri		Wenbovej 11, Sæby	1768		Cooperative slaughterhouse founded in 1910. It is now owned by Danish Crown.

=== Mariagerfjord Municipality ===
Name	Image	Location	Date	Coordinates	Description
H.I. Bies Brewery			1768		Brewery buildings from 1841 and later as well as a mineralwater factory from 1913.

=== Morsø Municipality ===
Name	Image	Location	Date	Coordinates	Description
Limfjordskompagniet			1768		Canned mussels factory. The oldest building is from 1910 with later additions.
Morsø Iron Foundry		Holgersgade 7, Nykøbing Mors	1768		Iron foundry founded in 1853. Two of the buildings are from 1813-14.

=== Thisted Municipality ===
Name	Image	Location	Date	Coordinates	Description
Thisted Brewery			1899		Brewery from 1899 with later additions.
