= MT Petar Hektorović =

Ferry owned by Jadrolinija

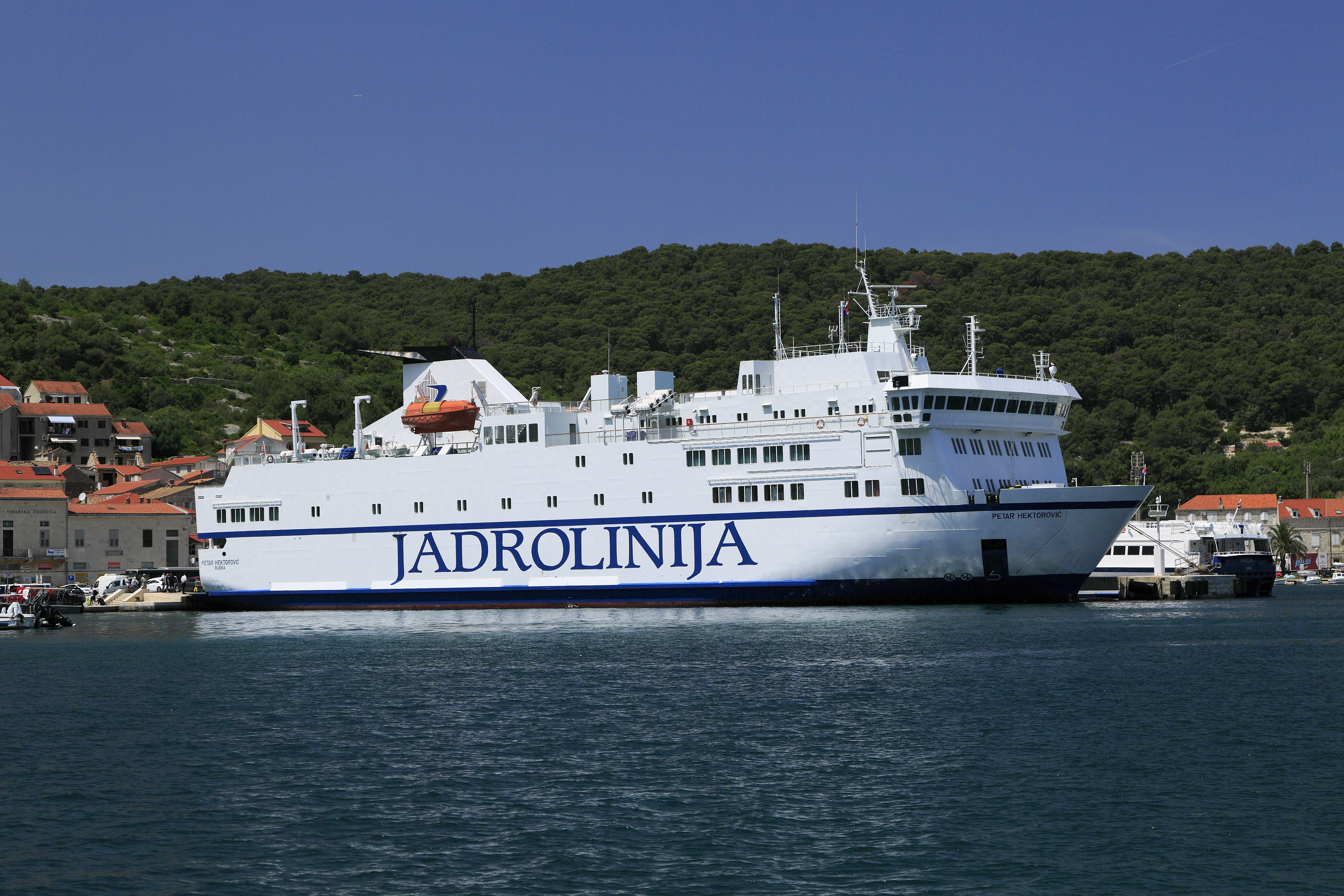
- MT Petar Hektorović moored in Vis, Croatia, May 2018

History
- Name: 1989–1998: Langeland III; 1998–present: Petar Hektorović
- Owner: 1989–1998: Langeland-Kiel; 1998–present: Jadrolinija
- Operator: 1989–1998: Langeland-Kiel; 1998–present: Jadrolinija
- Port of registry: 1989–1998: Denmark; 1998–present: Croatia, Rijeka
- Route: Split–Vis
- Builder: Svendborg Skibsværft, Frederiksø, Denmark
- Identification: IMO number: 8702446; MMSI number: 238160000; Call sign: 9A6551

General characteristics
- Type: Class A ro-ro/passenger Ship
- Tonnage: 6,721 GT; 804 DWT
- Length: 91.8 m (301 ft 2 in)
- Beam: 18 m (59 ft 1 in)
- Draught: 3.8 m (12 ft 6 in)
- Installed power: 1,800 kW (2,400 hp)
- Speed: 15.5 kn (28.7 km/h; 17.8 mph)
- Capacity: 1,080 passengers; 120 cars
- Crew: 22

MT Petar Hektorović is a roll-on/roll-off passenger and cargo ferry currently in use as part of the Croatian shipping company Jadrolinija's fleet. It is the only ferry regularly servicing the Split–Vis route in the Adriatic Sea and its crew has been praised for its skill in difficult waters and its performance in emergency service.

== Construction and sale ==
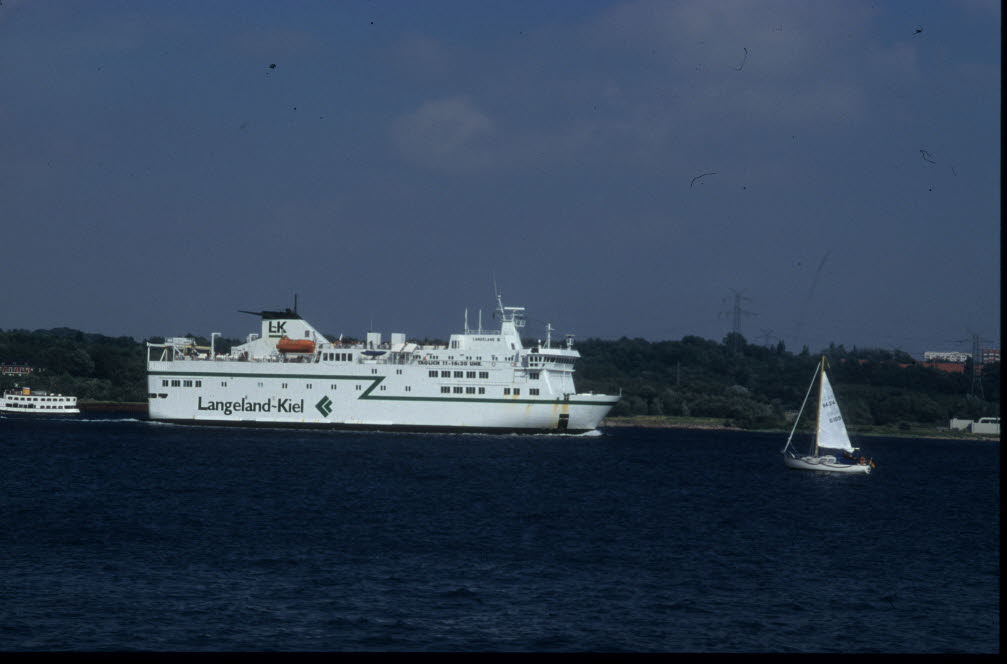
The ship, sailing as the Lageland III, off the coast of Kiel, August 1998

Built in Denmark in 1989 by Svendborg Skibsværft, the ship was originally intended for a Danish customer, Langeland-Kiel, who sailed it under the name of Langeland III. In 1998, it was bought by Jadrolinija and renamed after the author and poet Petar Hektorović (1487–1572), known for his coastal travelogue – Fishing and Fishermen's Talk (Croatian: Ribanje i ribarsko prigovaranje) – and collection of fisherman songs from the island of Hvar. The name was chosen because the ferry originally serviced the Split–Stari Grad line, the latter town being the hometown of Hektorović. It serviced that line for several years until it was transferred to the Split–Vis line, on which it still operates.

== Details ==
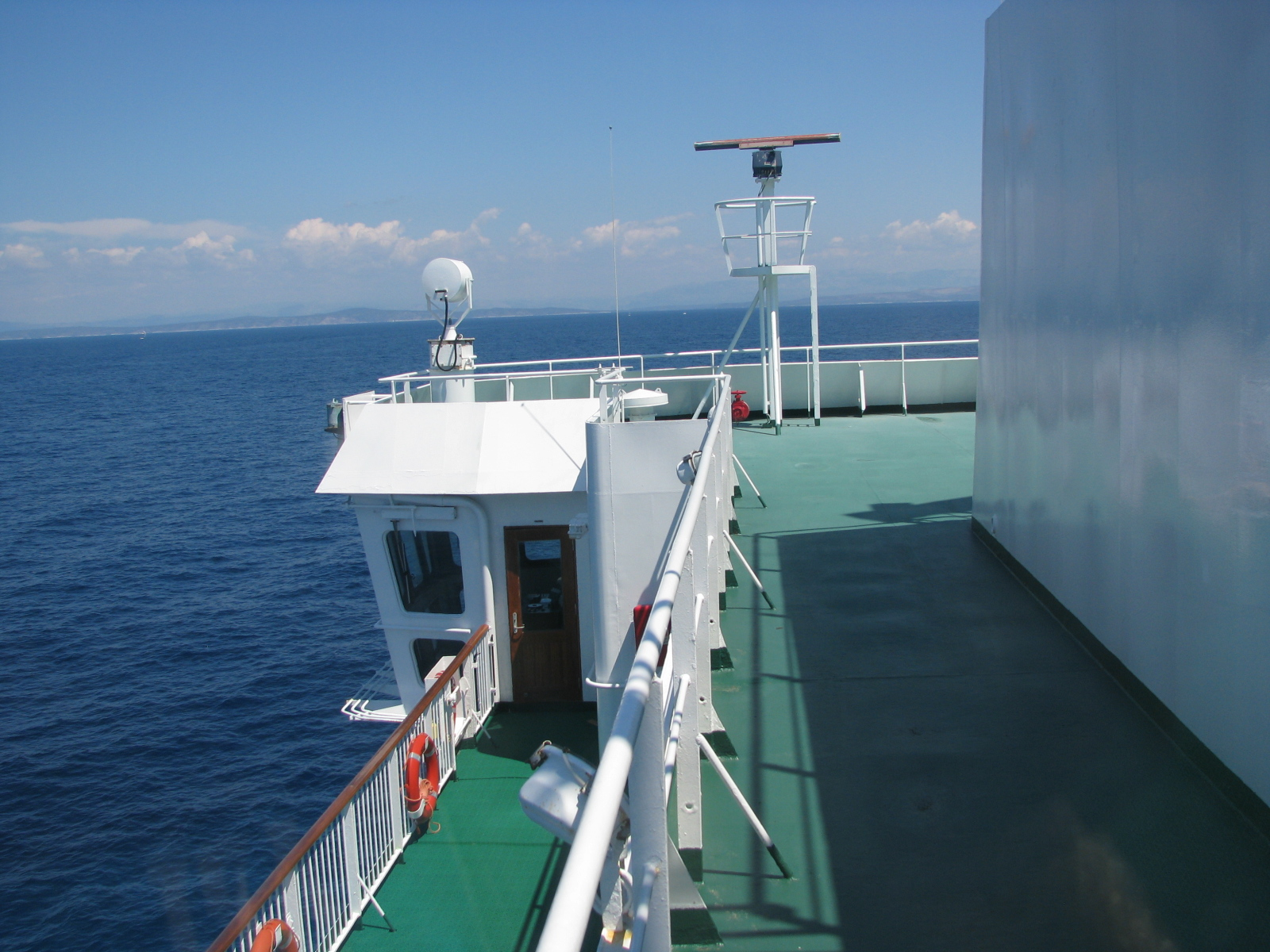
The top deck of the ferry

The ship is 91.8 m (301 ft 2 in) long and 18 m (59 ft 1 in) wide with a draft of 3.8 m (12 ft 6 in). Its maximum speed is 15.5 kn (28.7 km/h; 17.8 mph) and it is equipped two KRUPP–MaK diesel engines which harbor 1,800 kW (2,400 hp) a piece. The ship is rated to carry 1,080 passengers and 120 vehicles. It has a gross tonnage of 6,721 and a deadweight of 804 tons.

On board are two restaurants and two bars, as well as 800 seats and a shop. The deck is also decorated in honor of its namesake. The trip between Split and Vis takes about two hours and twenty minutes and is between 31–35 nautical miles (57–65 km; 36–40 mi). Daily operation of the ferry varies between three times a day during the height of tourist season in Croatia and twice a day during the low season. In 2017, the ship made 792 voyages on the Split–Vis line, transporting 52,912 vehicles. Because the town of Komiža is not connected to the mainland by a ferry line, about 41% of all vehicles carried on the ferry are ultimately headed to Komiža.

== Crew ==
In October 2006, five crew members were hospitalized during a regular boat escape drill with a sixth narrowly avoiding injury by jumping on the ship's deck. After further inspection, the ferry's two rescue boats were no longer allowed to be used and the total number of allowed passengers was decreased. During the inspection, the ship was shortly replaced on its route by the MF Lastovo, which reoccurred in February 2023 as a result of routine maintenance.

As of 2021, the ship is captained by Ante Granić and staffed by 22 crew members. The crew begins work at 5:30 am and ends work at 9:00 pm with two trips or 11:30 pm with three. The crew has been praised for its performance throughout its time on the Split–Vis line, particularly for its skill in bad weather, which is often exacerbated by the jugo katabatic winds, and in emergency services. In October 2023, the ship weathered a storm that disrupted commercial traffic in the Adriatic to deliver an injured Vis fireman to a hospital in Split, saving his fingers after an axe injury.

== Temporary reassignment ==
The ferry is fondly spoken of on the island of Vis, where it is a lifeline for the inhabitants who rely on it for its economy and supplies. When the ferry was quickly – although temporarily – transferred to the Split–Vela Luka–Ubli line to deal with a surge in passengers in May 2024, Vis residents reacted negatively online, claiming that the line had been cut off underhandedly and without warning. Some wrote "in memoriam" posts, with one poster asking:

What can we do to get you to come back to us? The bay of Vis grieves for you... (Note: Croatian: Što da učinimo da nam se vratiš? Viška vala tuguje za tobom...)

When the port in Vela Luka opened, the ferry was its first arrival.

== See also ==
- Dalmatia
- Croatian islands
