= HDMS Lossen =

The following ships of the Royal Danish Navy have borne the name HDMS Lossen:

- HDMS Lossen (1684), a frigate launched in 1684 and wrecked in 1717
- HDMS Lossen (1911) a minelayer launched in 1911 and scuttled in 1943
- HDMS Lossen (N44) a Lindormen-class minelayer launched in 1977 and transferred to Estonia in 2006 as EML Wambola

Danish Record Cards are available online for the following ships, all called Lossen

- Lossen (1666) - a galley
- Lossen (1673) - a frigate with a crew of 104 and up to 32 cannon (6 pounders or 3 pounders)
- Lossen (1769) - a skærbåd, gunboat with a crew of 50 and six small falkonettes
- Lossen (1910) - a mineship scuttled in Copenhagen harbour on 29 August 1943 along with most of the Danish fleet. Recovered and repaired by the Germans as Wismar
- Lossen (1978) - a cabelminelayer ("adopted home port" Sønderborg)

No ship named Lossen is listed at the Danish Naval Museum website
