= EML Wambola =

Four ships of the Estonian Navy have been named Wambola or Vambola (names often intermixed):

- Estonian destroyer Wambola, an Orfey-class destroyer acquired in 1919 and sold to Peru in 1933.
- EML Wambola (M411) (for information see et:Kondor-klassi miinitraaler and et:Sulev (laev 1972)), a Kondor class ship acquired 1994
- EML Wambola (M311), a Lindau-class minehunter acquired in 2000 and decommissioned in 2009.
- EML Wambola (A433), a Lindormen-class minelayer acquired by Estonia in 2006 as the training ship Kriistina, but handed over to the Estonian Navy in 2009 and renamed Wambola.
