= Køge Iron Foundry =

Former iron foundry in Køge, Denmark

- Køge Jernstøberi
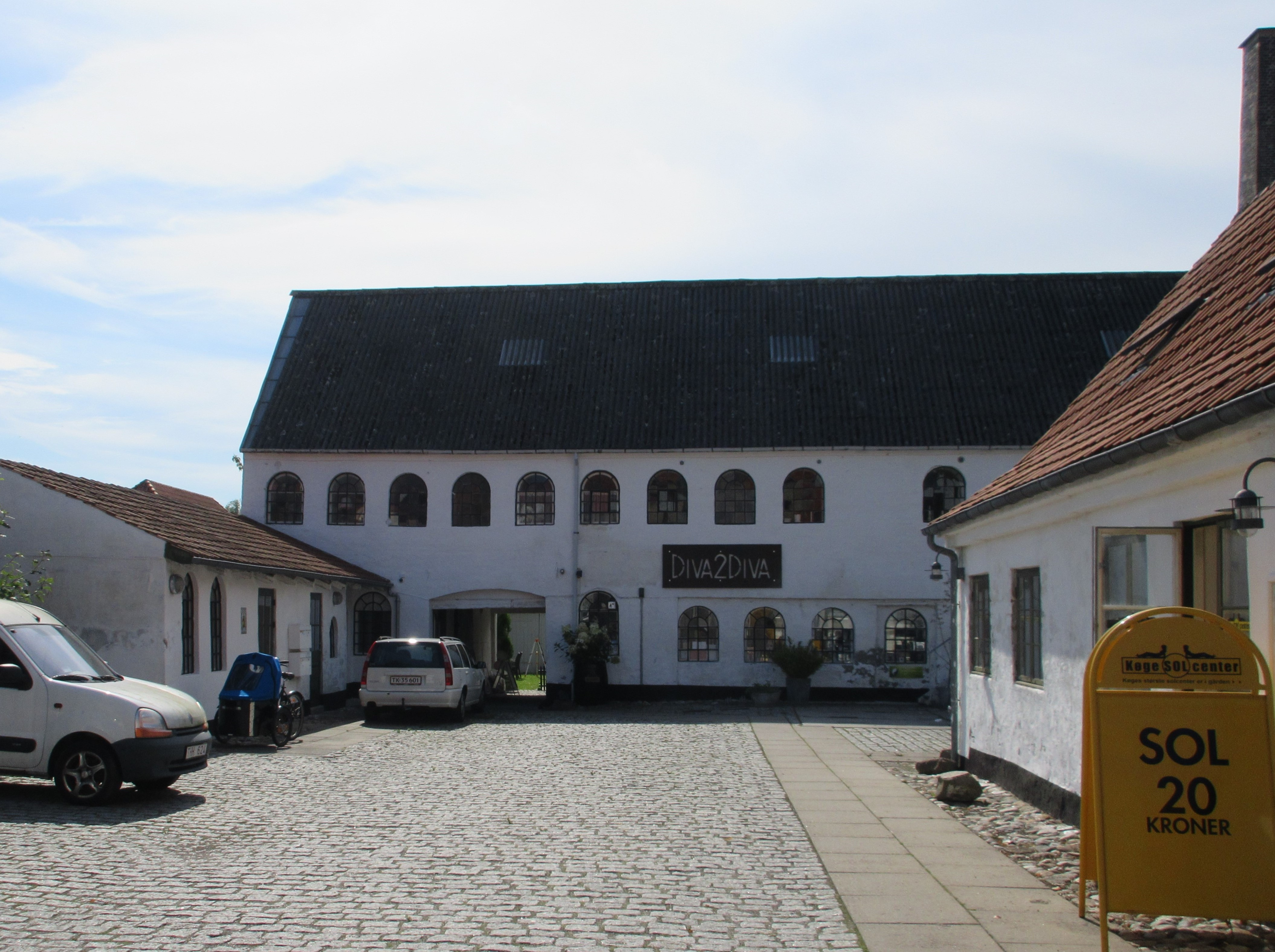
- The factory building from 1865 in the yard.
- Interactive map of the Køge Iron Foundry area

General information
- Location: Køge, Denmark
- Coordinates: 55°27′26.88″N 12°10′40.31″E
- Completed: 1837–75

Køge Iron Foundry (Danish: Køge Jernstøberi) is a former iron foundry situated in Vestergade in Køge, Denmark. The complex consists of a residential building fronting the street and a factory building and various lower buildings in two successive courtyards to its rear. The residential building, the factory building and a side wing are listed.

== History ==
Køge Iron Foundry was the first enterprise of its kind in Køge. It was established by the blacksmith H.C. Hansen in the 1830s Products included stoves, pots and pans, ploughs and threshing machines. From 1869, it also manufactured bicycles.

== Buildings ==
The two-storey building fronting Vestergadeis the former home of H. C. Hansen. It was built in 1875 as a replacement for an older building. It stands in undressed brick with arched windows. The cast iron reliefs on the frontage was manufactured by himself. A gate opens to a large courtyard. A long, low side wing dating from 1837 to 1840 extends from the rear side of the western end of the building. The two-storey factory building at the far end of the courtyard is built in limestone. Its arched cast iron windows were probably made by the company. A gate in the factory building opens to a second, smaller yard with stables.

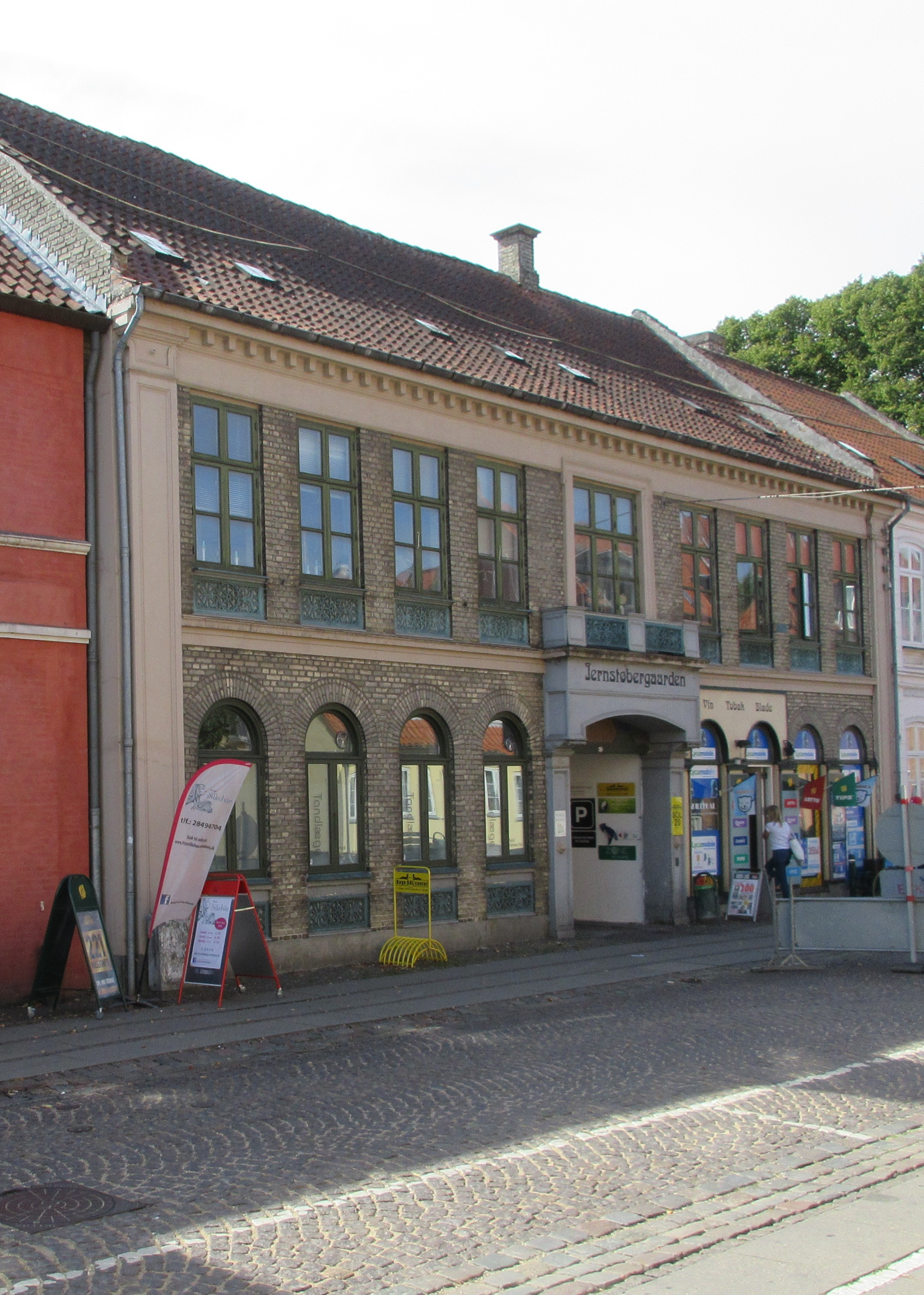
The residential building

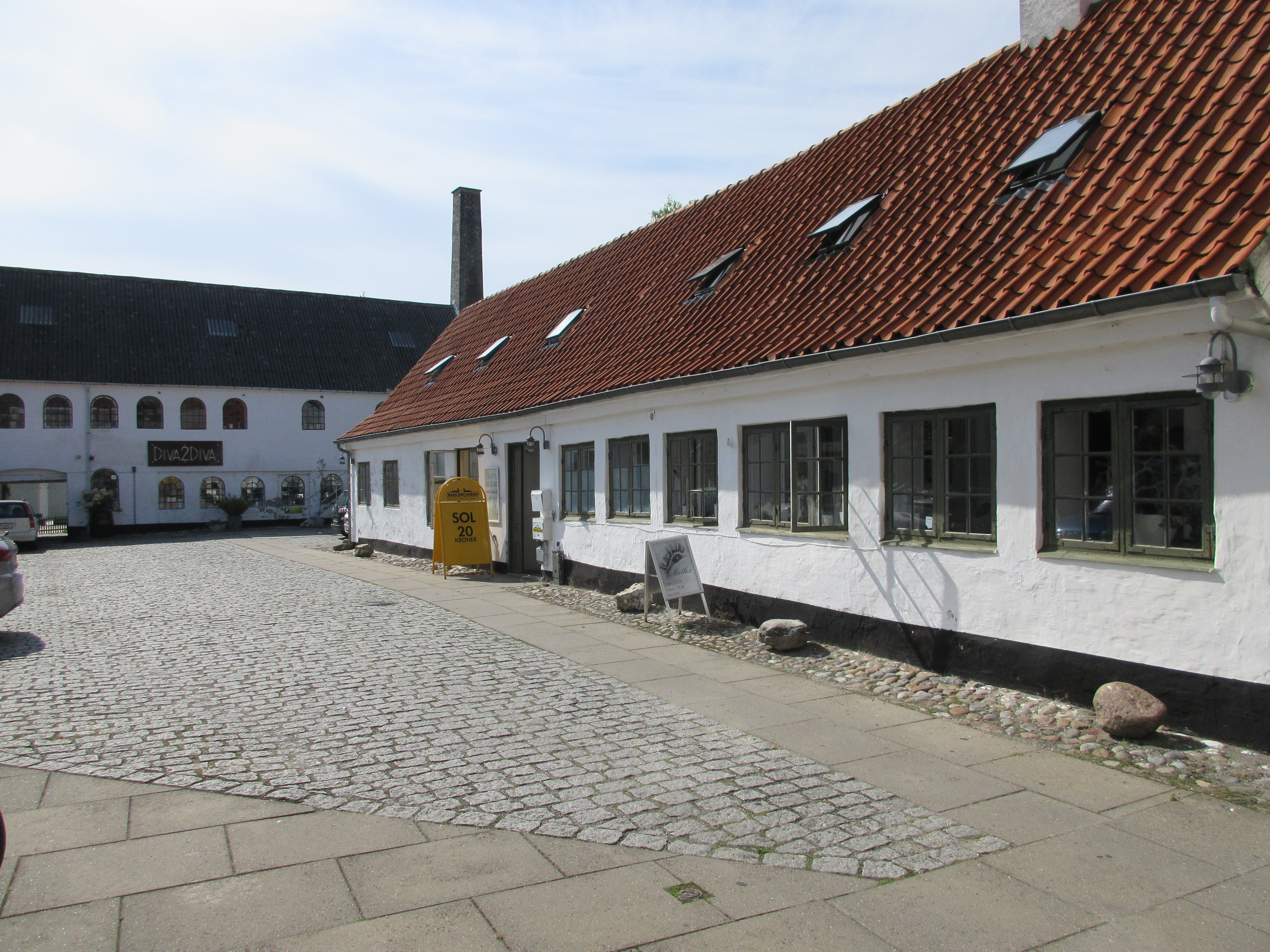
The listed side wing

== See also ==
- Sjiold Group
