= Christiansgave =

Building in Hørsholm Municipality, Denmark

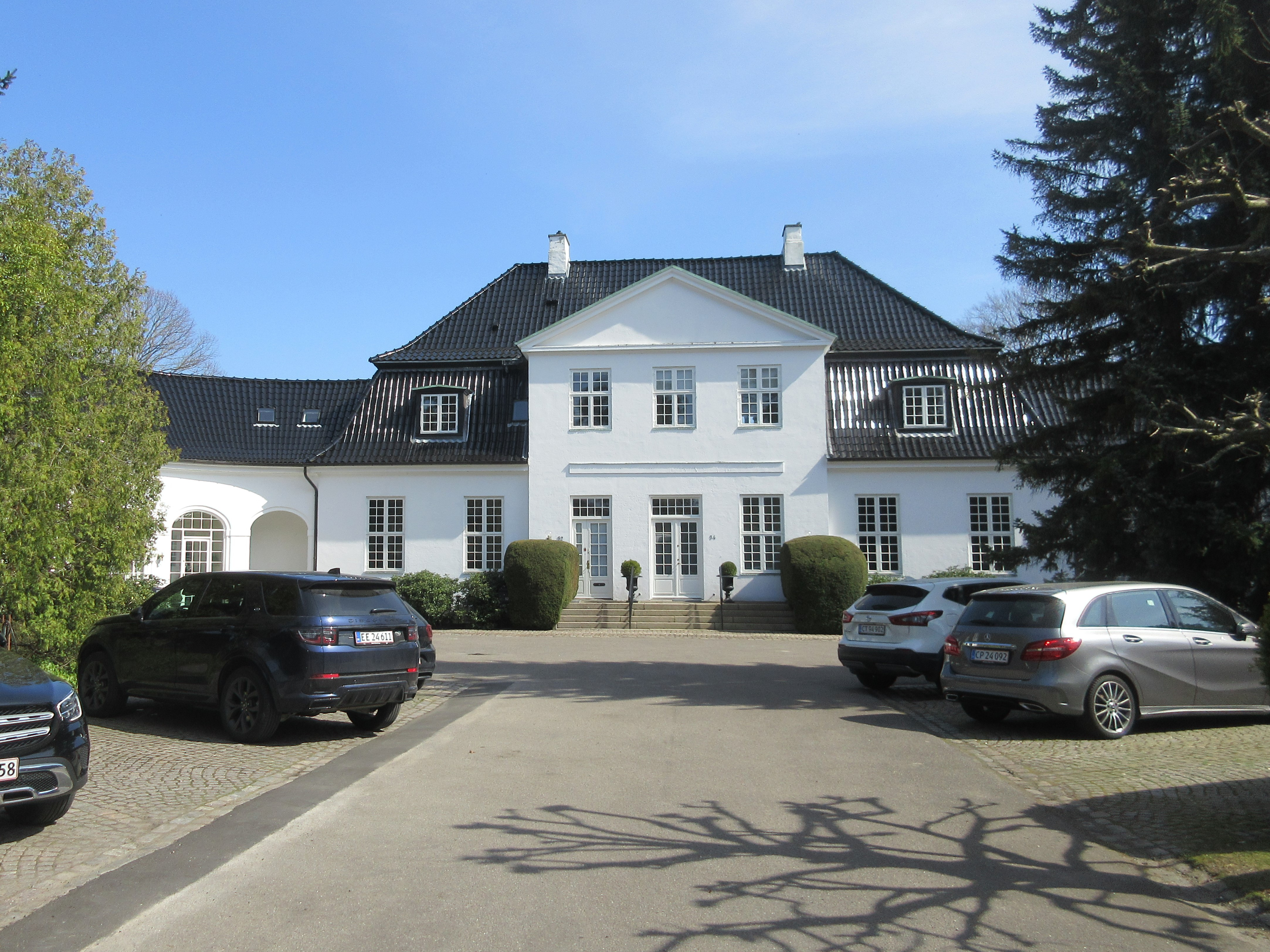
- Interactive map of the Christiansgave area

General information
- Location: Vedbæk, Rudersdal Municipality, Christiansgave 50, 2960 Rungsted Kyst, Denmark
- Coordinates: 55°52′18.0″N 12°33′04.7″E
- Construction started: 1918

Design and construction
- Architect: Carl Brummer

Christiansgave is a mansion in Rungsted, Hørsholm Municipalit, situated on the Øresund coast north of Copenhagen, Denmark. The house was constructed for the businessman Christian Wilhelm Messerschmidt in 1918 to designs by the architect Carl Brummer. The surrounding park was built over with terraced houses by the architect Jean Fehmerling in the mid-1950s.

== History ==
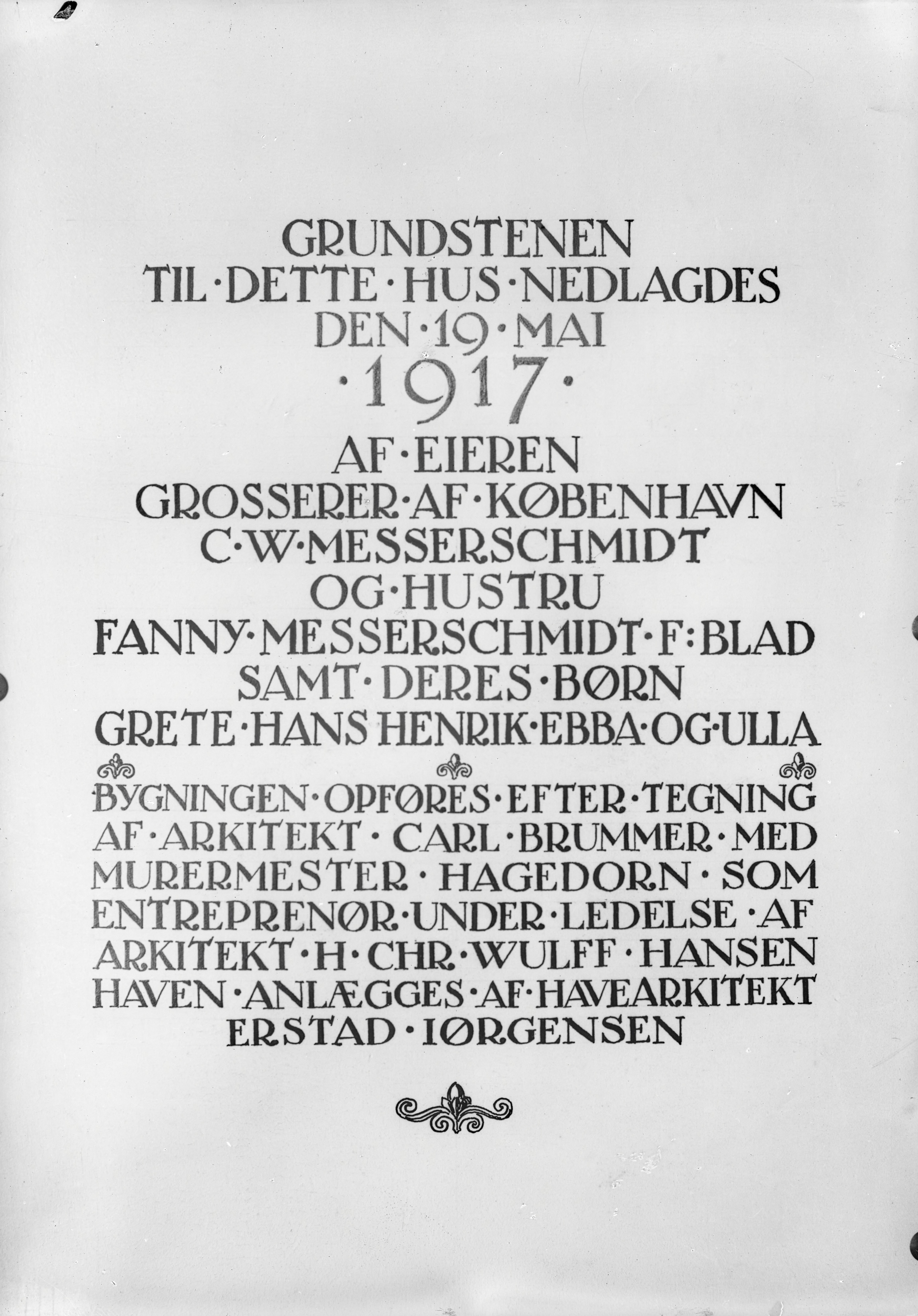
The foundation stone.

Christian Wilhelm Messerschmidt (1871–1948) was the son of the tannery owner Emil Messerschmidt. His two elder brothers, John and Louis Messerschmidt, continued their father's tannery at Gammel Kongevej 25. In 1898, Christian Wilhelm Messerschmidt established a wholesale company trading in tannins, extracts, and leather.

In the middle of the 1910s, Messerschmidt bought a piece of land in Rungsted, north of Copenhagen. He subsequently charged the architect Carl Brummer with the design of a country house for the site. The foundation stone was set on 19 May 1917, and the house was completed in the following year. The large property was located on both sides of Rungsted Strandvej. The house was built as a present for his wife, Fanny. It was given the name Christiansgave (Christian's Gift).

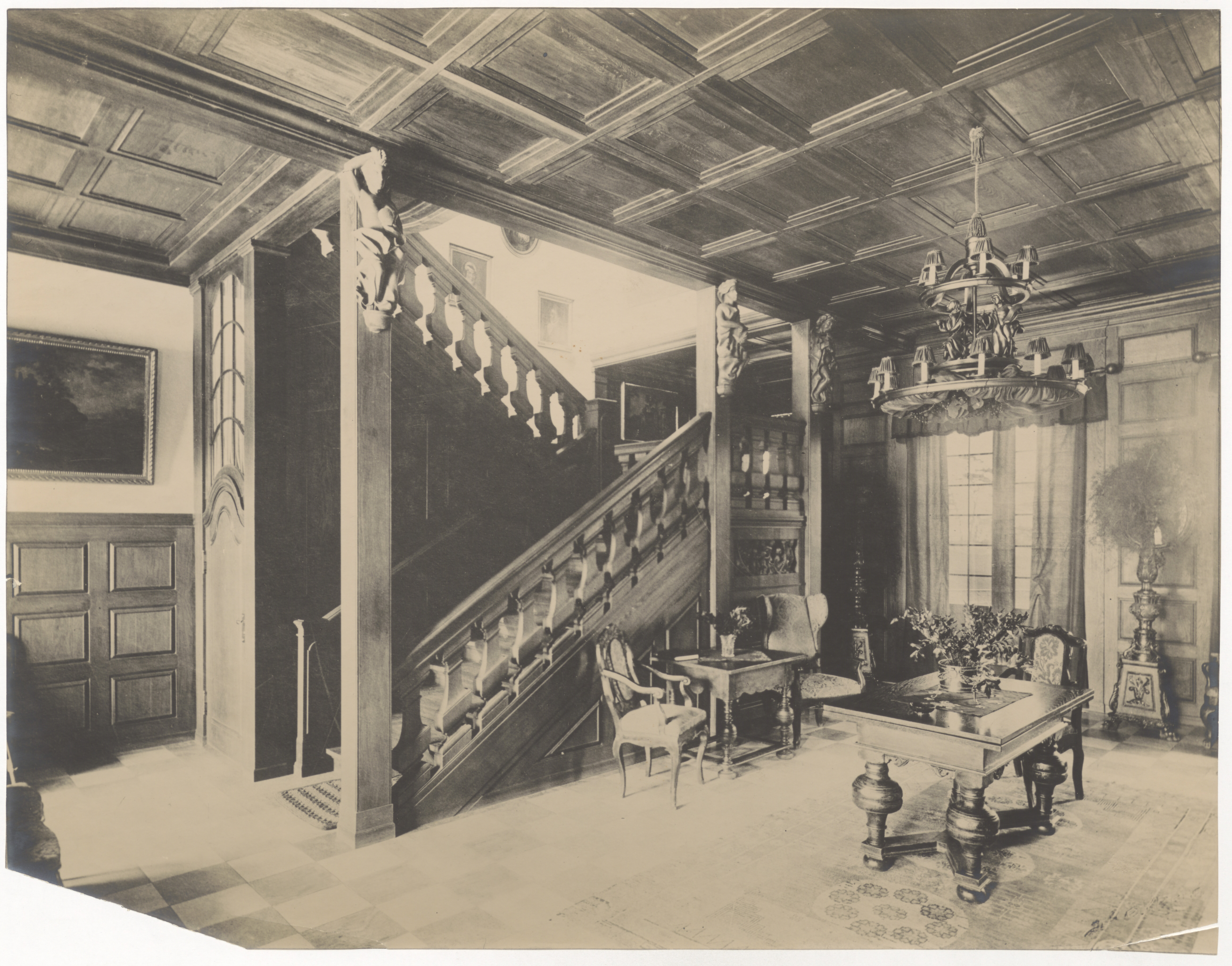
Christiansgave, interior.

The property was later acquired by James Watt Christensen (1862–193). He was a pharmacist in Stege on Møn and heir of Morsø Iron Foundry on Mors. Messerschmidt's uncle Knud Einar Messerschmidt was the technical director and co-owner of Christensen's company N. An. Christensen & Co. His widow owned Christiansgave until at least 1937.

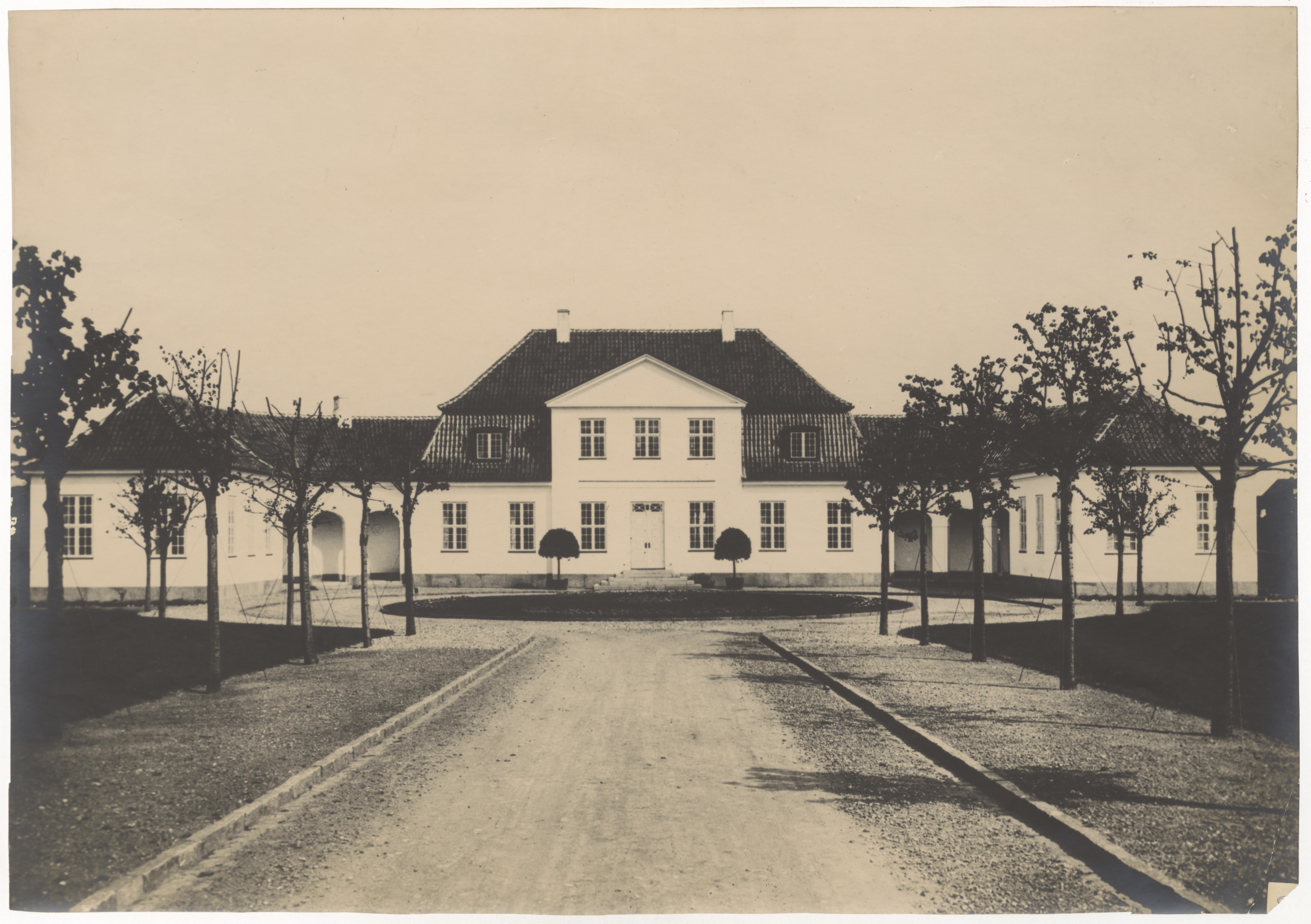
Christiansgave.

In the early 1950s, Christiansgave was acquired by the architect Jean Fehmerling. His vision was to create an enclave with homes for families with more modest incomes in the affluent Rungstedf neighbourhood. The surrounding park was therefore built over with terraced houses. The buildings on the west side of Rungsted Strandvej were demolished. The main building housed Fehmerlin's architectural studio as well as communal facilities for the surrounding houses. In the end, the economic scheme proved unviable. The individual houses were therefore sold as condominiums.

== Architecture ==
Christiansgave was designed with inspiration from Baroque architecture with a U-shaped floor plan. The seven-bay-long Corps de logis features a three-bay median risalit, tipped by a triangular pediment. It is flanked by two curved secondary wings. The building has a Mansard roof clad in black-glazed tile.

== Gallery ==
=== Main building ===
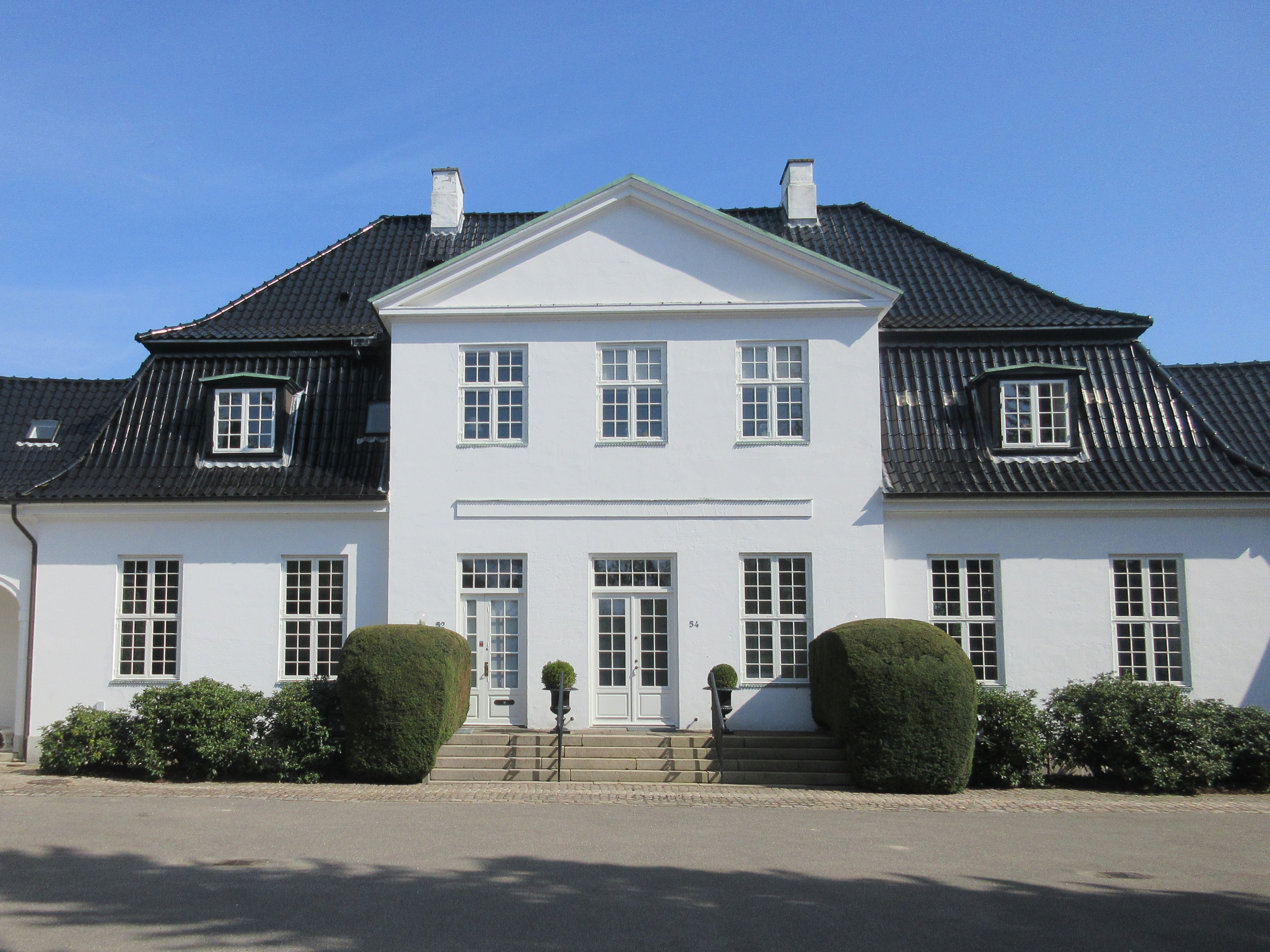

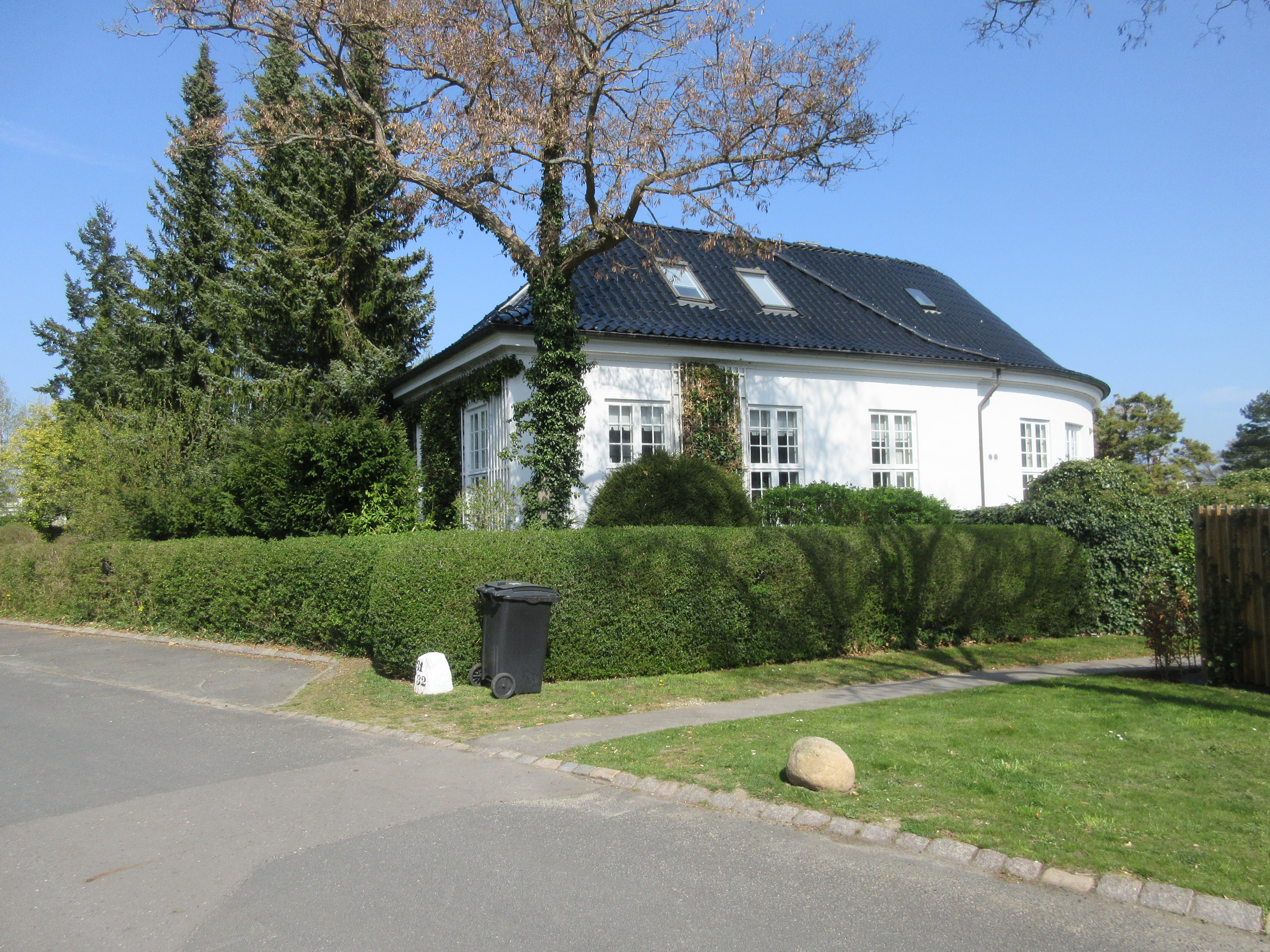

Christiansgave (Rungsted) sidefløj.jpg|One of the curved secondary wings.

=== Town houses ===
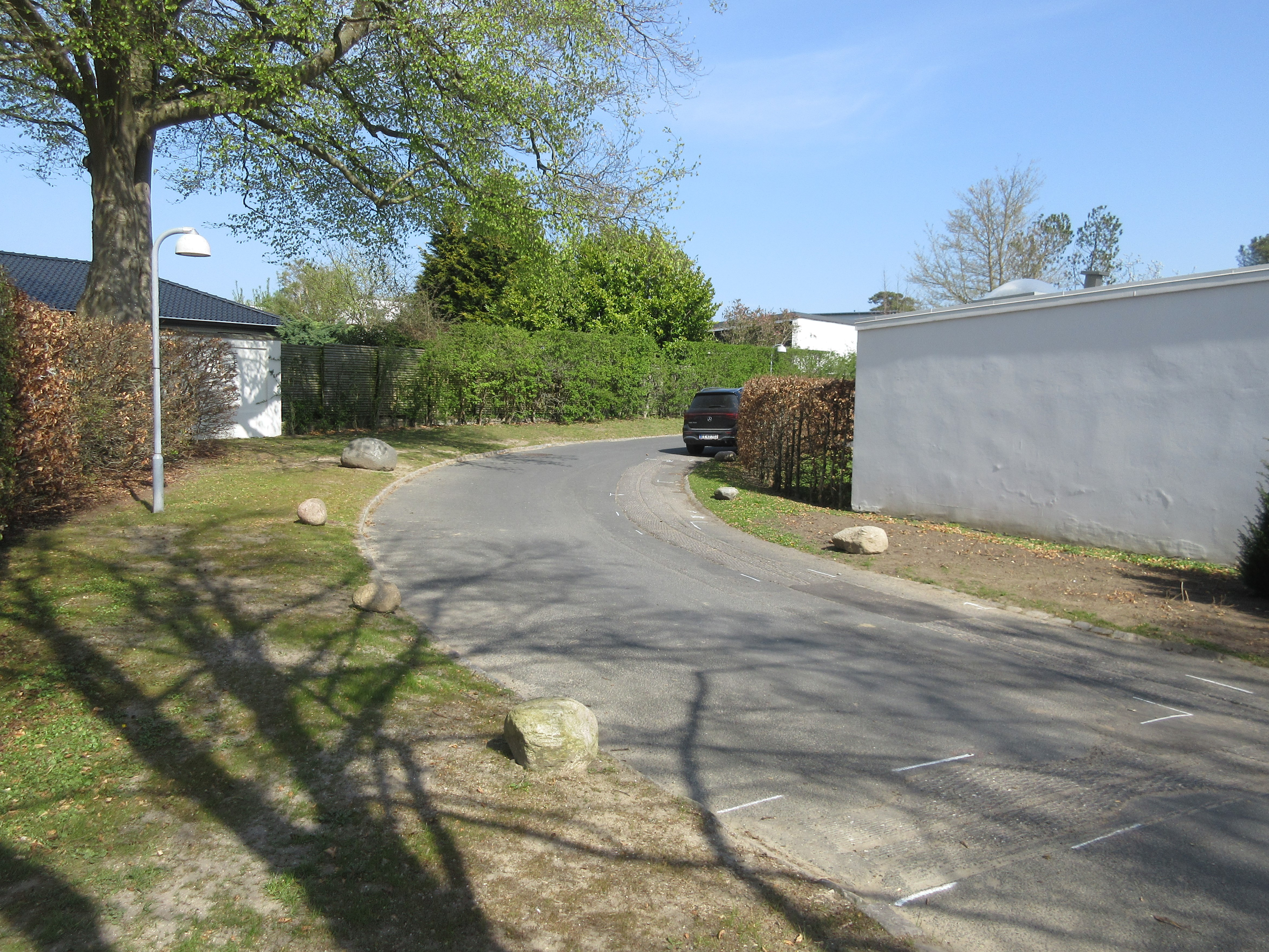

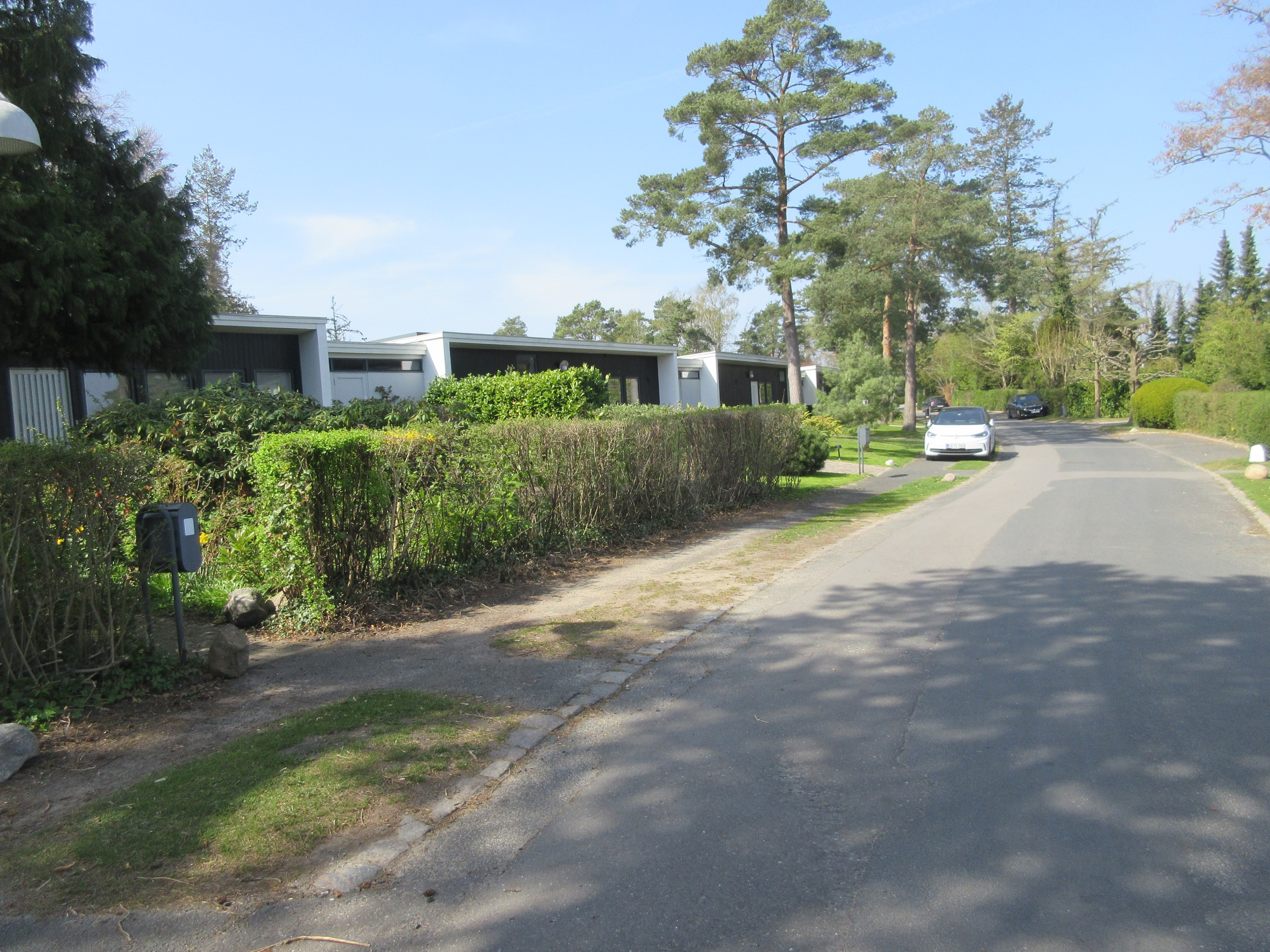

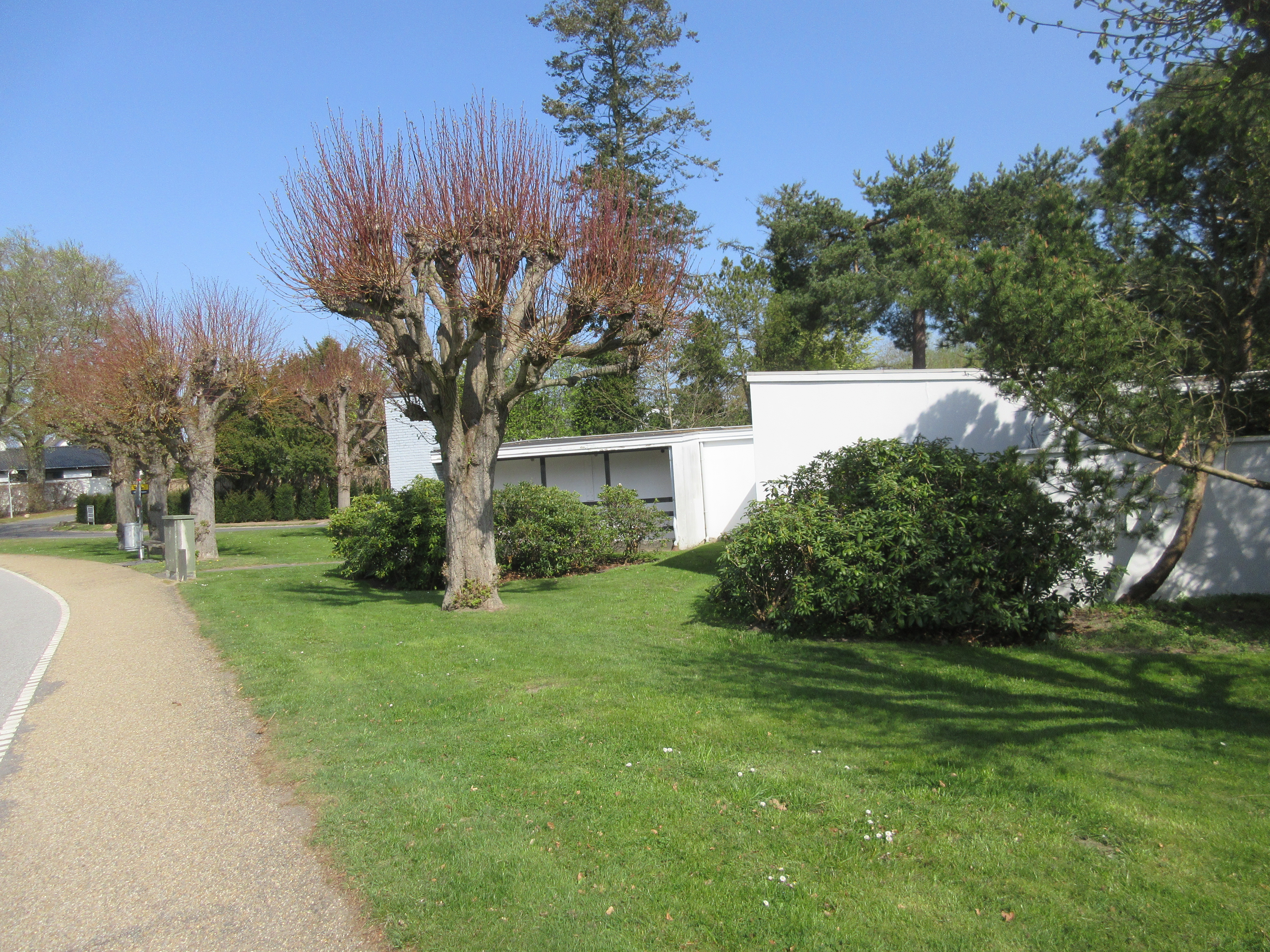
