= Amager Center =

Shopping centre in Copenhagen, Denmark

Coordinates: 55°39′47″N 12°36′16″E

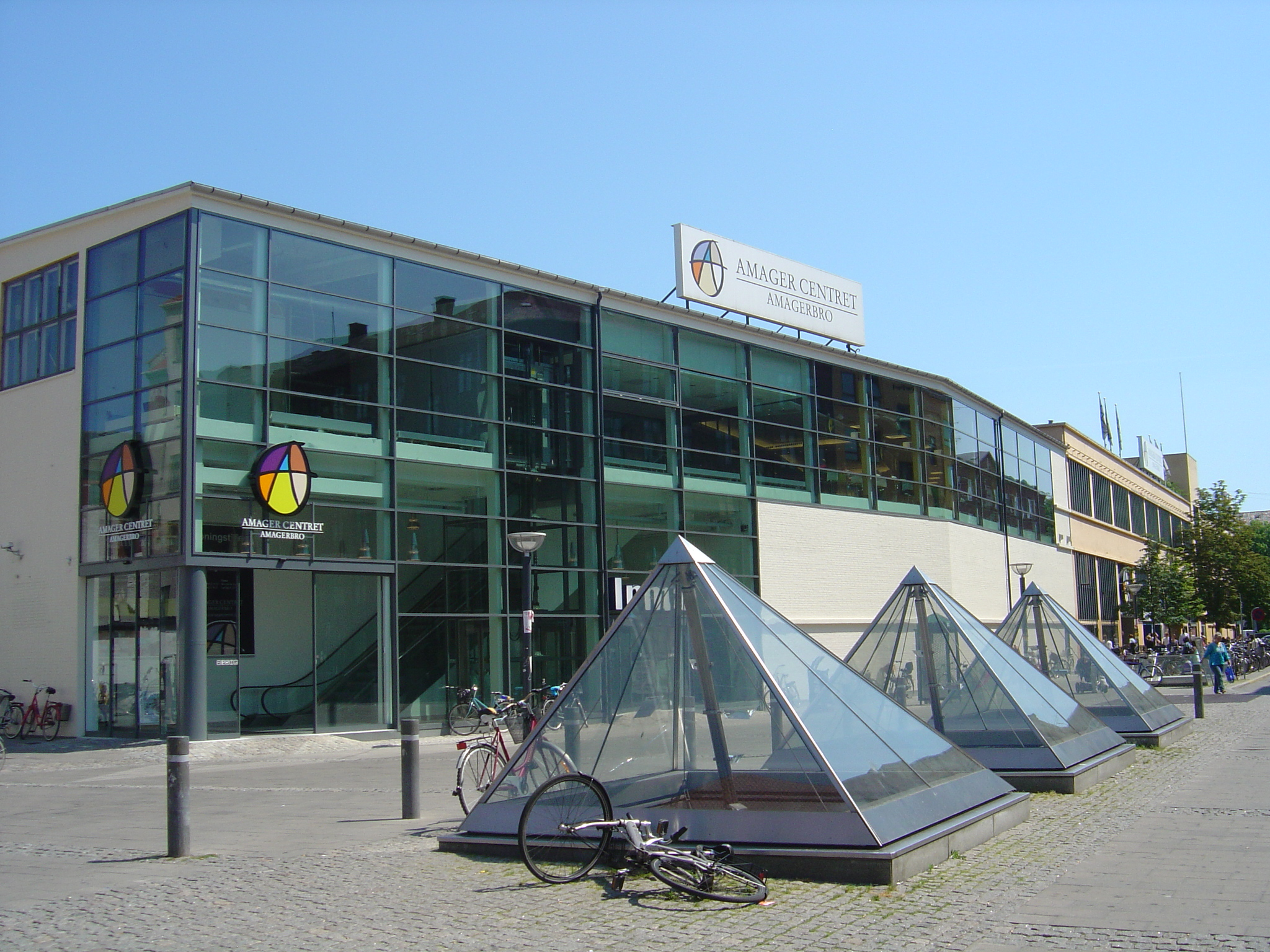
Amager Centret seen from Amagerbro metro station

Amager Centret is a shopping centre on Amager, just off Amagerbrogade, in Copenhagen, Denmark. It is located next to Amagerbro Station.

== History ==
An estate known as Oliegreen was located on the site in the second half of the 18th century. On 4 February 1812, it was purchased by Jacob Holm, a ship owner and industrialist from Christianshavn, who wanted to use it for his many industrial enterprises which required still more space. Later that year he established a rope walk in a wooden building. The facility was expanded and modernized many times over the course of the next 150 years. The buildings which now form part of the shopping centre mostly date from the late 1930s. Jacob Holm & Sønner moved the production of rope to Randers in 1971. The buildings were then taken over by Kamopsaz and the investor and converted into the shopping centre which opened in 1975.

A local plan required the centre to contain a theatre venue and a library. The theatre, Amagerscenen, which was founded by Sejr Volmer-Sørensen, closed in 1998. The former theatre room was converted into a two-storey Hennes & Mauritz store in 2002. A major refurbishment of the shopping centre was completed in 2006.

== Facilities ==
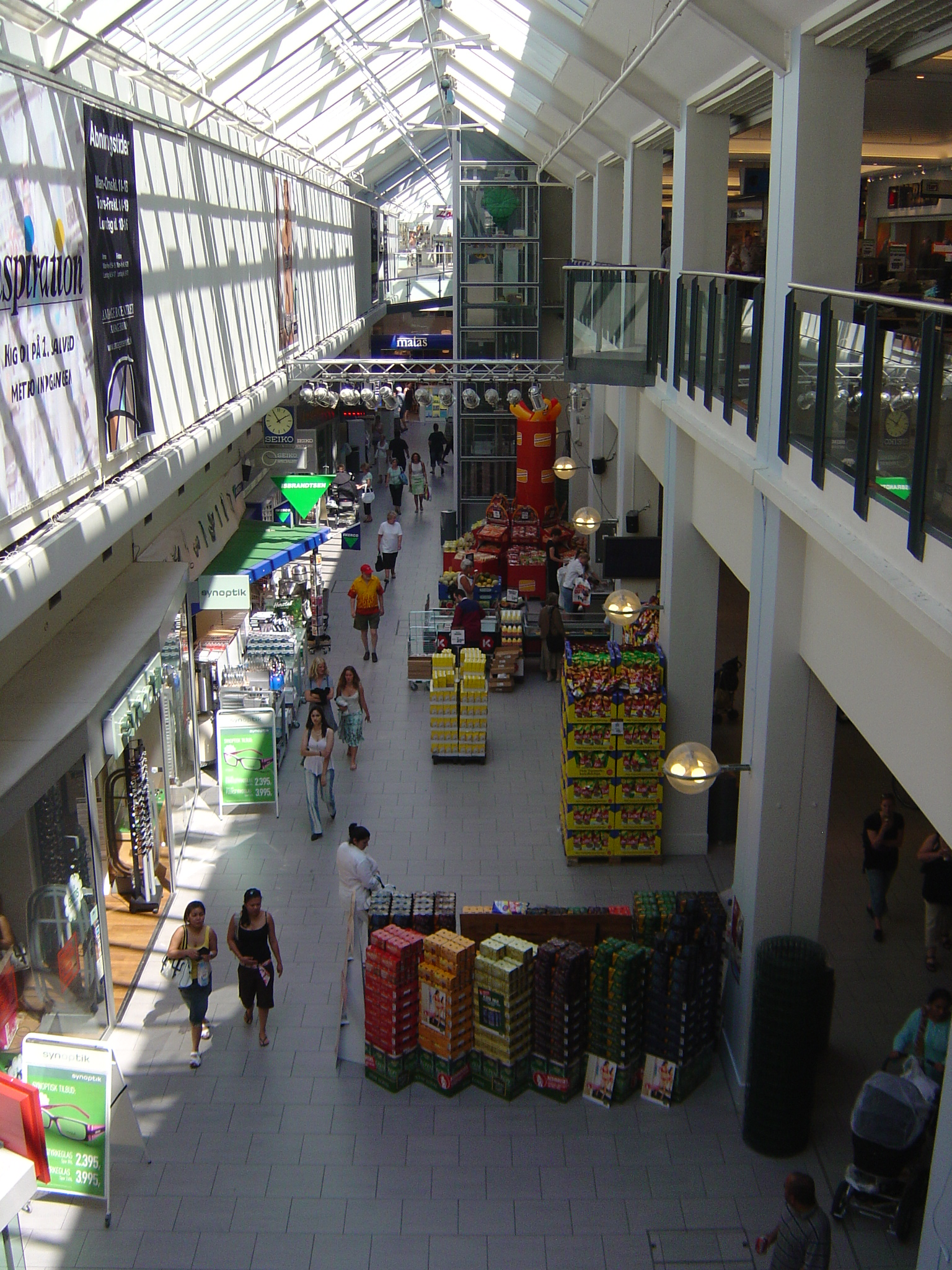
Interior

Amager Centret contains 64 stores and restaurants, covering a total floor area of some 16,000 square metres. It also contains a medical centre and an eye clinic.

The shopping centre has a seven deck parking facility which was built in 1999.
