= Gammel Kongevej 25 =

Historic building in Copenhagen, Denmark

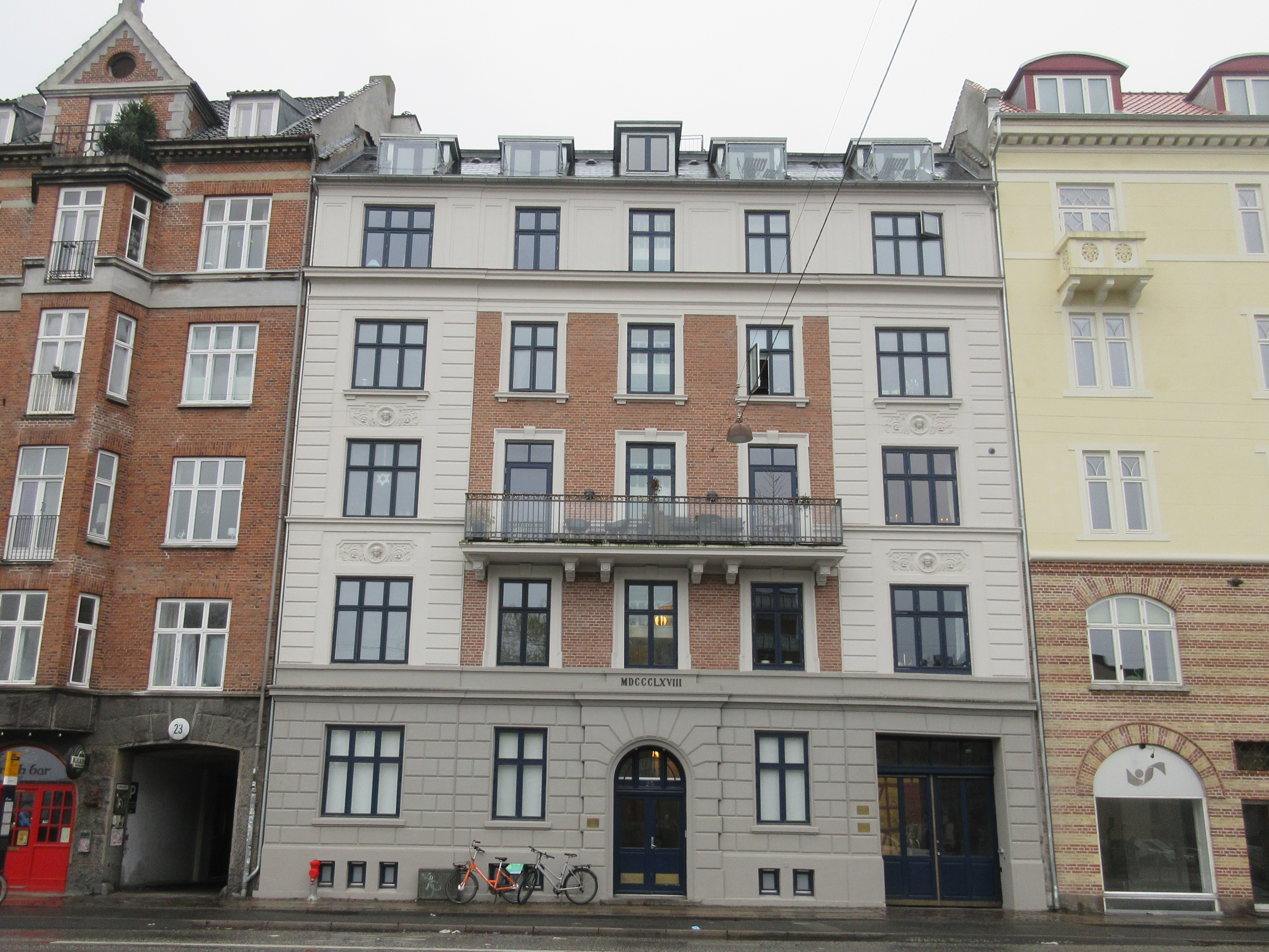
- Gammel Kongevej 25 in December 2020
- Interactive map of the Gammel Kongevej 25 area

General information
- Location: Copenhagen, Denmark
- Coordinates: 55.67353°N 12.55586°E
- Completed: 1867/1869

Gammel Kongevej 25, situated opposite St. Jørgen's Lake, on the border between Vesterbro and Frederiksberg in Copenhagen, Denmark, consists of a five-storey Late Neoclassical residential building fronting the street and the former Emil Messerschmidt's Tannery on its rear. The three-winged tannery complex is one of relatively few surviving examples of the many minor industrial enterprises that once dominated the courtyards of Copenhagen's Vesterbro and Nørrebro districts. The current buildings were constructed by Emil Messerschmidt after a fire in 1867 and later continued by his two eldest sons until another fire in 1907.

A commemorative plaque on the facade of the building commemorates that the resistance fighter Ingolf Larsen-Ledet (1919-1944) was killed on the site when he jumped out of a window in an attempt to escape from the Gestapo during World War II.

== History ==
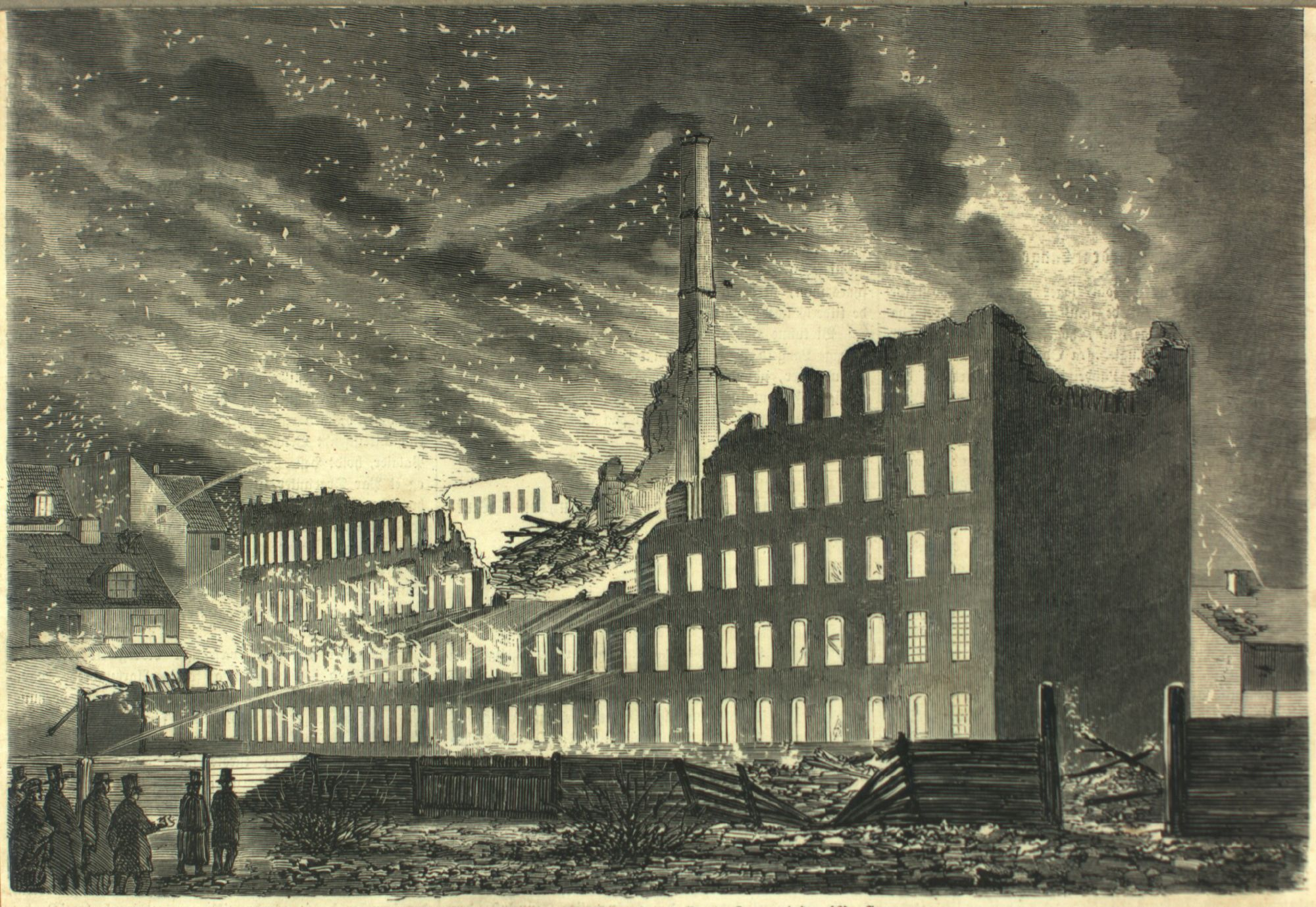
Messerschmidt's Tannery in 1888

The tannery was founded in 1844 by Christian William Messerschmidt (1804-1888), a retired army officer with rank of major. In 1853, he ceded it to his son, Emil Messerschmidt (1828-1877), who moved it to its current location. The large quantities of water that played an essential role in the production process was sourced directly from Rosenåen, a former moat from the 1620s, which crossed Gammel Kongevej at the site.

On 16 January 1867, Messerschmidt's tannery was hit by fire. The tannery was rebuilt the same year. A residential building fronting the street was constructed in 1869.

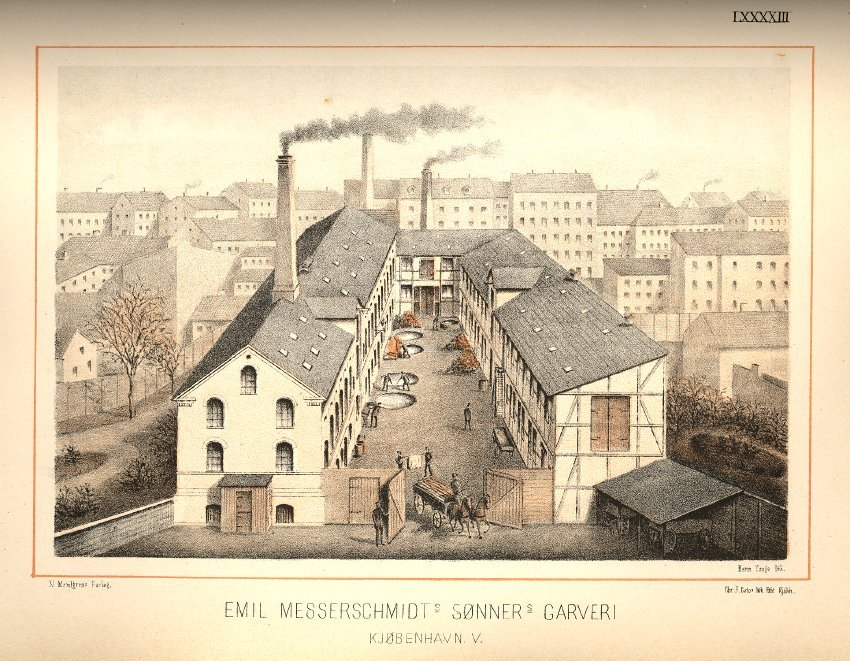
Messerschmidt's Tannery in 1888

On Emil Messerschmidt's death, it was passed down to his two eldest sons: John (born 1855) and Louis Messerschmidt (born 1858). A younger son, Christian Wilhelm Messerschmidt (1871-1948), would in 1895 start a wholesale company trading in tannins, extracts and leather. He is also remembered for building the country house Christiansgave in Rungsted north of Copenhagen. Louis Messerschmidt was from 1904 to 1916 alderman of the Tanners' Guild in Copenhagen.

In 1907, the tannery was once again hit by fire. The property was acquired the following year by A/S M. I. Ballins Sønner. It was decommissioned as a tannery in around 1920. The buildings were then used as a furniture storage and by minor manufacturing companies.

The building fronting the street was restored by Erik Arkitekter in 2017.

== Architecture ==
The tannery occupies three sides of a central courtyard to the rear of the residential building. The eastern wing is constructed in brick and used to contain the tannery's boiler and machinery. The two other wings are built with timber framing. The ground floor of the western wing was originally used as stables. The upper floor was used for storing hides and chemicals used in the production. The rear wing was heightened from one to two floors after the fire in 1907.

== Commemorative plaque ==
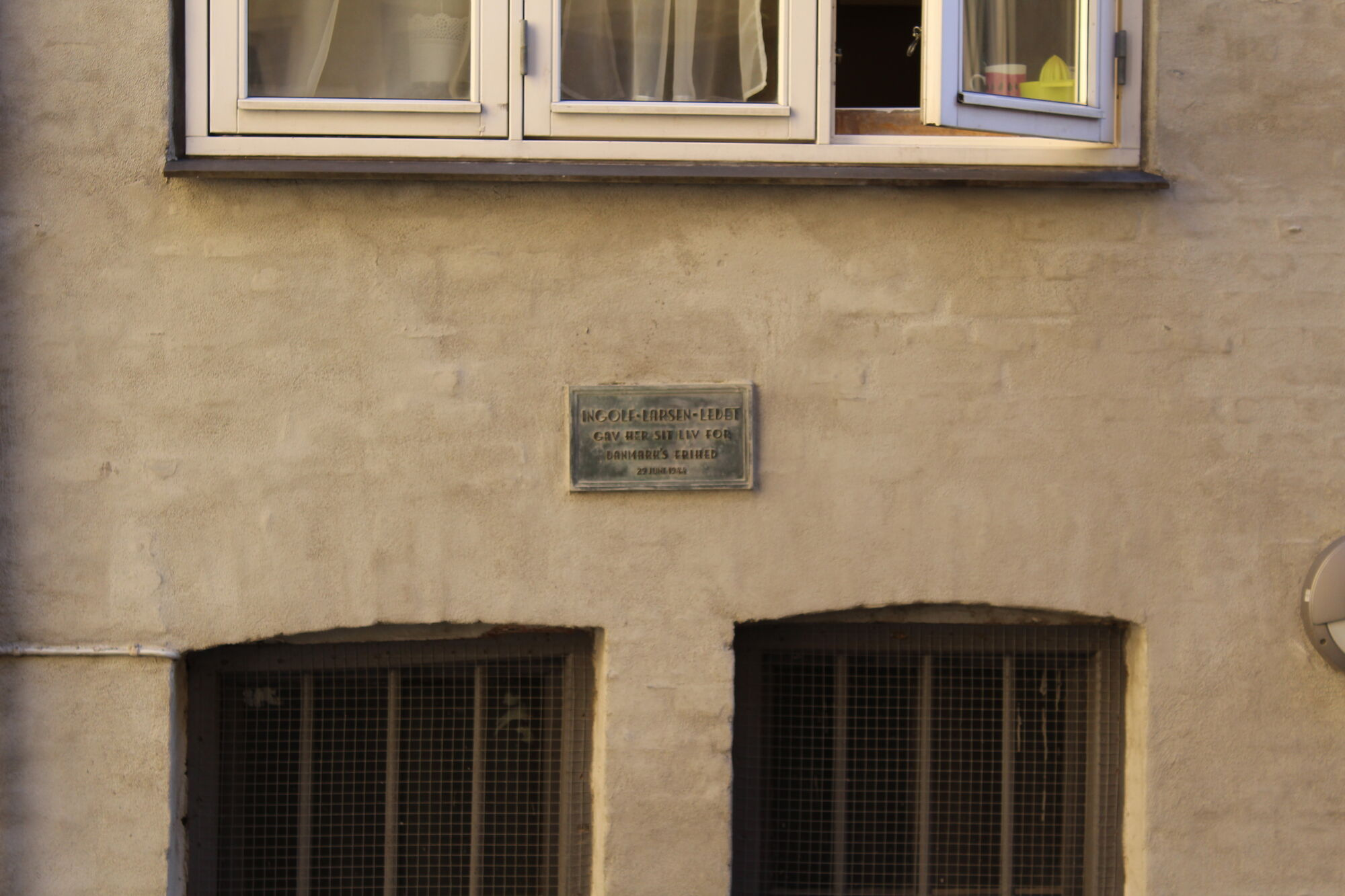
Commemorative plaque.

A commemorative plaque on the facade reads: "INGOLF·LARSEN-LEDET / GAVE HIS LIFE FOR / DENMARK'S FREEDOM / 29 JUNE 1944" ("INGOLF·LARSEN-LEDET / GAV HER SIT LIV FOR / DANMARK'S FRIHED / 29 JUNI 1944"). During the Occupation of Denmark in World War II, Ingolf Larsen-Ledet (1919-1944) was involved in the underground publication De danske Studenter as well as the escape routes out of Copenhagen. He was killed during an attempted escape from the Gestapo when he jumped out of a closed window from one of the apartments.

== See also ==
- Rud Rasmussen
