= Lindormen-class minelayer =

Class of minelayers

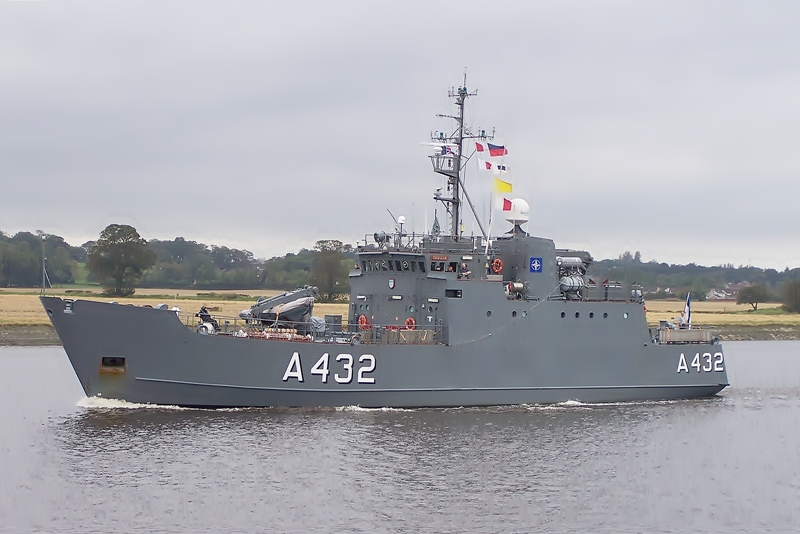
- ENS Tasuja passing Clydebank on her way to KGV Dock in Glasgow, Scotland

Class overview
- Name: Lindormen class
- Builders: Svendborg Skibsværft
- Operators: Royal Danish Navy; Estonian Navy
- Preceded by: Lougen class
- Built: 1977
- In commission: 1978–present
- Planned: 2
- Completed: 2
- Active: 1
- Laid up: 2
- Retired: 1

General characteristics as built
- Type: Minelayer
- Displacement: 575 t (566 long tons) full
- Length: 44.5 m (146 ft 0 in)
- Beam: 9.0 m (29 ft 6 in)
- Draught: 2.65 m (8 ft 8 in)
- Propulsion: 2 × 4,200 bhp (3,100 kW) Frichs diesel engines; 2 x propellers
- Speed: 14 knots (26 km/h; 16 mph)
- Complement: 27
- Armament: 2 × single 20 mm guns; 50–60 naval mines

The Lindormen class is a class of two minelayers built for the Royal Danish Navy to replace the Lougen-class minelayers that dated from World War II. The Lindormen class was designed to lay controlled minefields in the Baltic Sea during the Cold War as part of NATO's defence plan for the region. They were taken out of service by the Danish in 2004, put up for sale in 2005 and transferred to Estonia in 2006.

== Design ==
The ships have a steel hull and were originally designed to lay controlled minefields. They have a full load displacement of 575 tonnes (566 long tons) and measure 44.5 metres (146 ft 0 in) long overall with a beam of 9.0 m (29 ft 6 in) and a draught of 2.65 m (8 ft 8 in). (Note: The class' basic measurements vary between sources. The ships have a length overall of between 43.30 m (142 ft 1 in) to 44.3 m (145 ft 4 in) and the draught from 2.5 m (8 ft 2 in) to 2.9 m (9 ft 6 in)) The ships were initially propelled by two Frichs 7AX diesel engines turning two shafts creating 3,100 kilowatts (4,200 bhp). (Note: Again, the sources disagree on the power output of the diesel engines, with some claiming 1,200 kW (1,600 hp).) This gave them a speed of 14 knots (26 km/h; 16 mph) They were later replaced with two MTU diesel engines, providing 1,600 kW (2,100 hp) of power in total. The ships were initially armed with two Oerlikon 20 mm cannons - one fore and one aft. In 1985, another 20 mm cannon was added to the fore. In 1997, a pair of FIM-92 Stinger launchers were also added. The weapons were removed when they were sold to Estonia. Estonian Navy later equipped the ships with M2 Browning machine guns. They are also equipped with two I-band navigation radars, two cranes (one 2 tonne crane fore and one 2.8 tonne crane aft) and two boats. The ships have a large mine deck, sufficient for carrying 50–60 naval mines, but can also be used for diving support, training or command duties. Their initial complement was 27 in Danish service which increased to 29 in Estonian service.

== Ships in class ==
Lindormen class construction data
Danish name	Pennant no.	Builder	Laid down	Launched	Danish service		Estonian name	Pennant no.	Estonian service	
Danish name	Pennant no.	Builder	Laid down	Launched	Commissioned	Decommissioned	Estonian name	Pennant no.	Commissioned	Status
Lindormen	N43	Svendborg Skibsværft, Svendborg, Denmark	20 January 1977	20 September 1977	26 October 1977	22 October 2004	Tasuja	A432		Laid up 2016
Lossen	N44	Svendborg Skibsværft, Svendborg, Denmark	22 June 1977	11 November 1977	30 January 1978	22 October 2004	Wambola	A433	12 April 2006	In service

== Service history ==
=== Danish service ===
Following the Danish entry into NATO, the Royal Danish Navy was tasked with defending the Baltic Sea against the Soviets during the Cold War. To fulfill this objective, the Danish Navy placed an emphasis on the acquisition of torpedo boats, submarines, minelayers and minesweepers. The class consists of two ships, Lindormen (transl. Dragon) and Lossen (transl. Lynx). The purchase of the cable-minelayers was approved in the 1973 defence bill as a replacement for the World War II-era Lougen-class minelayers for the Royal Danish Navy. The ships were built by Svendborg Skibsværft in 1977. Lindormen served as a command and support ship in NATO's Standing Naval Force Channel (STANVAFORCHAN) in 1989 and again in 1990. Lossen served with STANAVFORCHAN in 1982, 1985, 1988, 1989 and 1992. Lossen was also used as a submarine depot ship.

=== Estonian service ===
Both ships were decommissioned by the Danish Navy on 22 October 2004 and sold to Estonia in 2006. They were renamed EML Tasuja (A432) and EML Wambola (A433). Tasuja was first placed in service with the Estonian Navy while Wambola was lent to the Estonian Maritime Academy as a civilian training vessel. Wambola was held in reserve until it replaced Tasuja in Estonian Navy service in 2016. Wambola served with the Standing NATO Mine Countermeasures Group 1in 2017.

== Sources ==
- Couhat, Jean Labayle, ed. (1986). Combat Fleets of the World 1986/87. Annapolis, Maryland: Naval Institute Press. ISBN 0-85368-860-5.
- Gardiner, Robert; Chumbley, Stephen & Budzbon, Przemysław, eds. (1995). Conway's All the World's Fighting Ships 1947–1995. Annapolis, Maryland: Naval Institute Press. ISBN 1-55750-132-7.
- "Lindormen klass" [Lindormen class] (in Estonian). Estonian Navy.
- Saunders, Stephen, ed. (2009). Jane's Fighting Ships 2009–2010 (112 ed.). Alexandria, Virginia: Jane's Information Group Inc. ISBN 0-7106-2888-9.
- Wertheim, Eric, ed. (2013). The Naval Institute Guide to Combat Fleets of the World (16th ed.). Annapolis, Maryland: Naval Institute Press. ISBN 9-7-815911-4954-5.
