= Skiold Group =

Danish agricultural machinery manufacturer

Skiold Group (formerly A/S Sæby Jernstøberi) is a manufacturer of agricultural machinery headquartered in Sæby, Denmark.

== History ==
The company was founded as Sæby Iron Foundry and Machine Factory by P. Sørensen in 1877. Its products included engines and agricultural machinery. The founder's son Albert Sørensen continued the operations from 1912.

In 1928, Henrik Nielsen acquired the company. In 1928, Sæbry Jernstøberi was converted into a limited company (aktieselskab) as A/S Sæby Jernstøberi. On 1 July 1985, its name was changed to A/S Maskinfabrikken Skiold, Sæby.

== Today ==
The company is today owned by Solix Group. It is headquartered in Sæby and has subsidiaries in nine countries. Its three production sites are located in Sæby, Bur and Ølgod. A new factory in Poland is expected to open in 2024.
