= C. Schous Fabriker =

Danish consumer products manufacturing and retail company

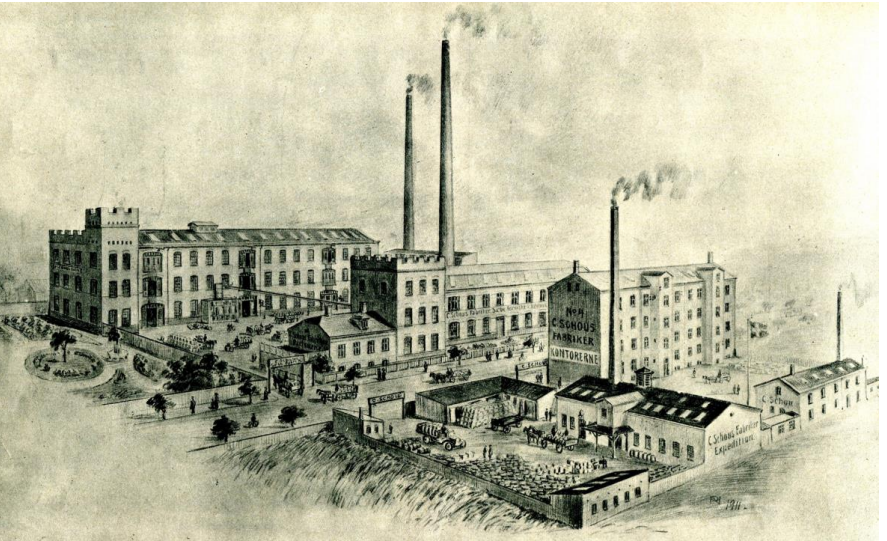
C. Schous Fabriker on H. C. Nielsens Vej in Copenhagen.

C. Schous Fabriker was a manufacturer and retailer of consumer products based in Copenhagen, Denmark. The company specialized in the production, distribution, and provision of household, health care, personal care, and associated products. In the 1920s, with more than 800 outlets, its chain of Schous Sæbehus shops was the largest of its kind in the country.

== History ==
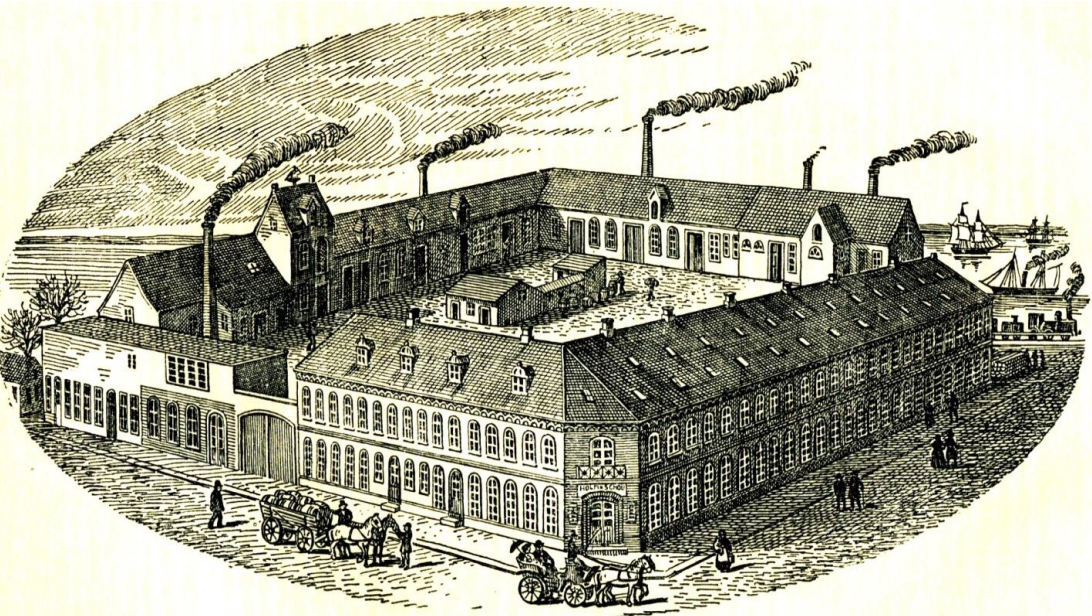
H- C- Schou's property in Nørresundby, 1865.

Jens Christian Schou (1836–1900) was born in Thisted as the son of a carpenter. He attended the local latin school. He later apprenticed with merchant Galster's widow in Nørresundby. In 1859, Galster closed the company. The remains of it was subsequently acquired by Schou and his somewhat older collogue Sofus Holm who had also worked for Galster. The new company operated under the name Holm & Schou. Sophus Holm left the company in 1865. Schou's property was just a few months later destroyed in the Greart Fire of Nørresundby. He received 60,000 Danish rigsdaler from the insurance company. This enabled him to cpmstruct a large new building complex at the corner of the town's central market square and the street Vestergade.He supplemented the income from his grocery business with the manufacturing of confectionary and chemical products.

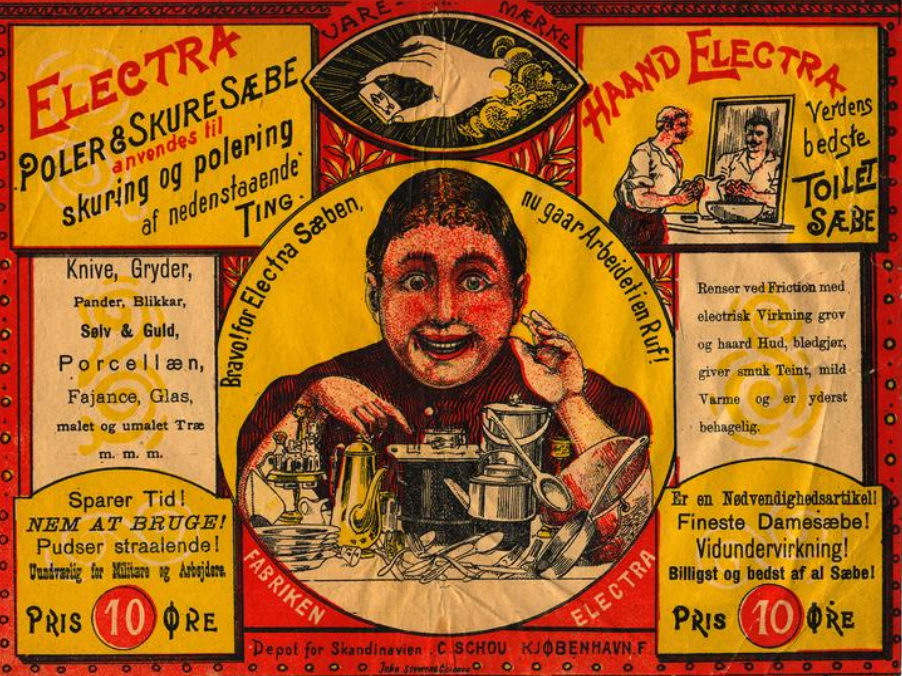
Advert for C. Schou's Electra soap, c. 1895-

In 1888, the company moved to Copenhagen. It was initially located on Godthåbsvej. In 1892, it relocated to new premises on Sankt Peders Stræde.

After the death of Jens Christian Schou in 1900, the business was continued by his widow, Caja Severine Schou, (née Bøggild, b. 1928). In 1904 she made their two sons Lauritz Kjellerup Bøggild Schou, (1866–1938) and Holger Schou (1871–1948) as partners. Not long thereafter shecompletely withdrew from the operations. C. Schous Fabriker later inaugurated a large new factory complex at H. C. Jensens Vej 4 in Copenhagen's North-West district. In around 1900, the company began to set up Schous Sæbehus shops in towns across the country.

The company had 4,000 employees in 1950. It was headquartered at Kronprinsessegade 28. At the time, the company's board members were Oluf Schou (b. 1885), C. L. Da.vid (b. 1878), Marius Schou (b. 1902) and Holger H. Schou (b. 1903). The chief executing officers were en Oluf Schou, Marius Schou and Holger H. Schou. New factories were later established at Nymølle and Ravnholm in Lyngby. The company went bankrupt in 1974.

== Legacy ==
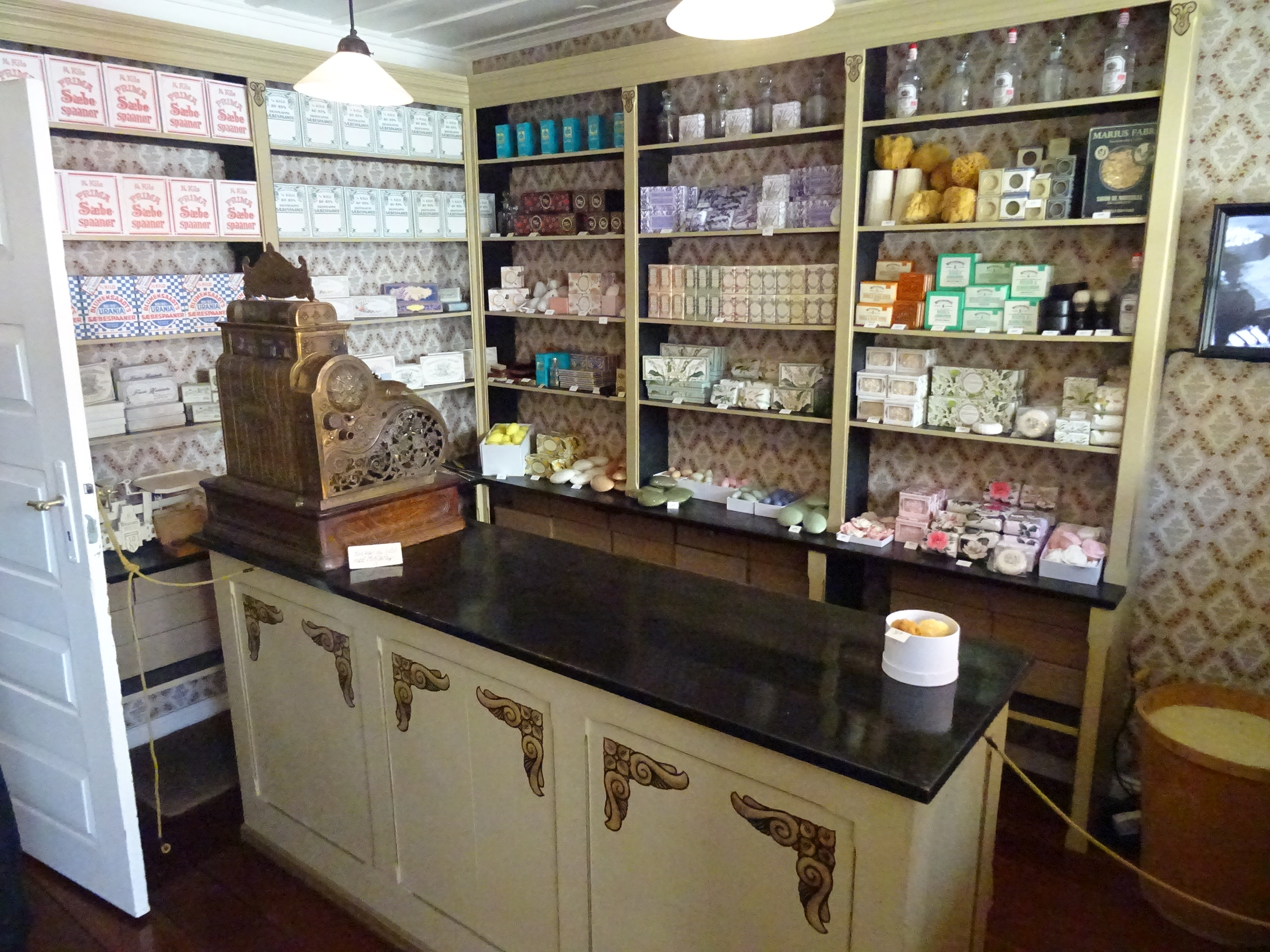
Interior of the shop in Den Gamle By

The company's former factory at Nymøllevej 50 in Lyngby was later taken over by Haldor Topsøe.

A Schous Sæbehus shop from Viborg has been reconstructed in Den Gamle By in Aarhus.
