= Frederiksø =

Island in Svendborg, Denmark

Coordinates: 55°03′34″N 10°37′05″E

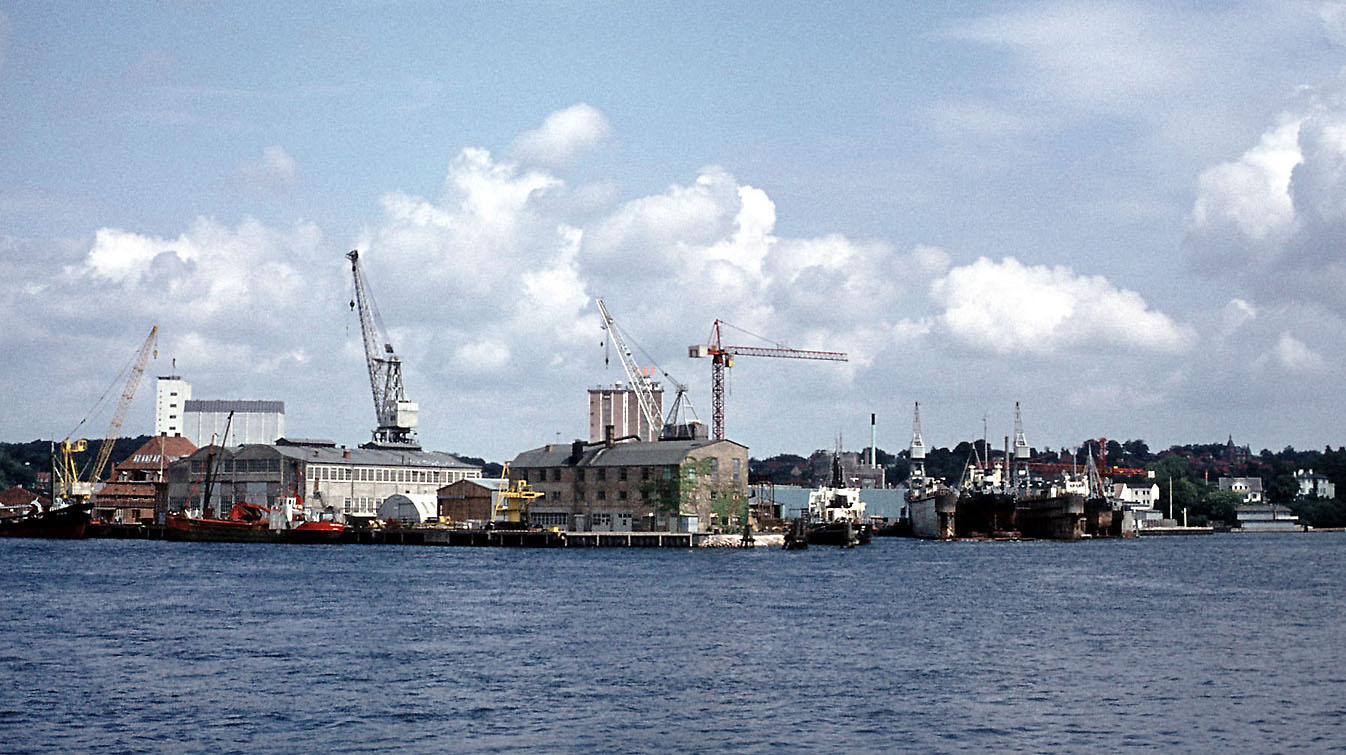
Svendborg Skibsværft on Frederiksø in 1973

Frederiksø is a small island in the port of Svendborg, Denmark, which until 2001 housed Svendborg Skibsværft.
