= Svendborg Skibsværft =

Former shipyard in Frederiksø, Denmark

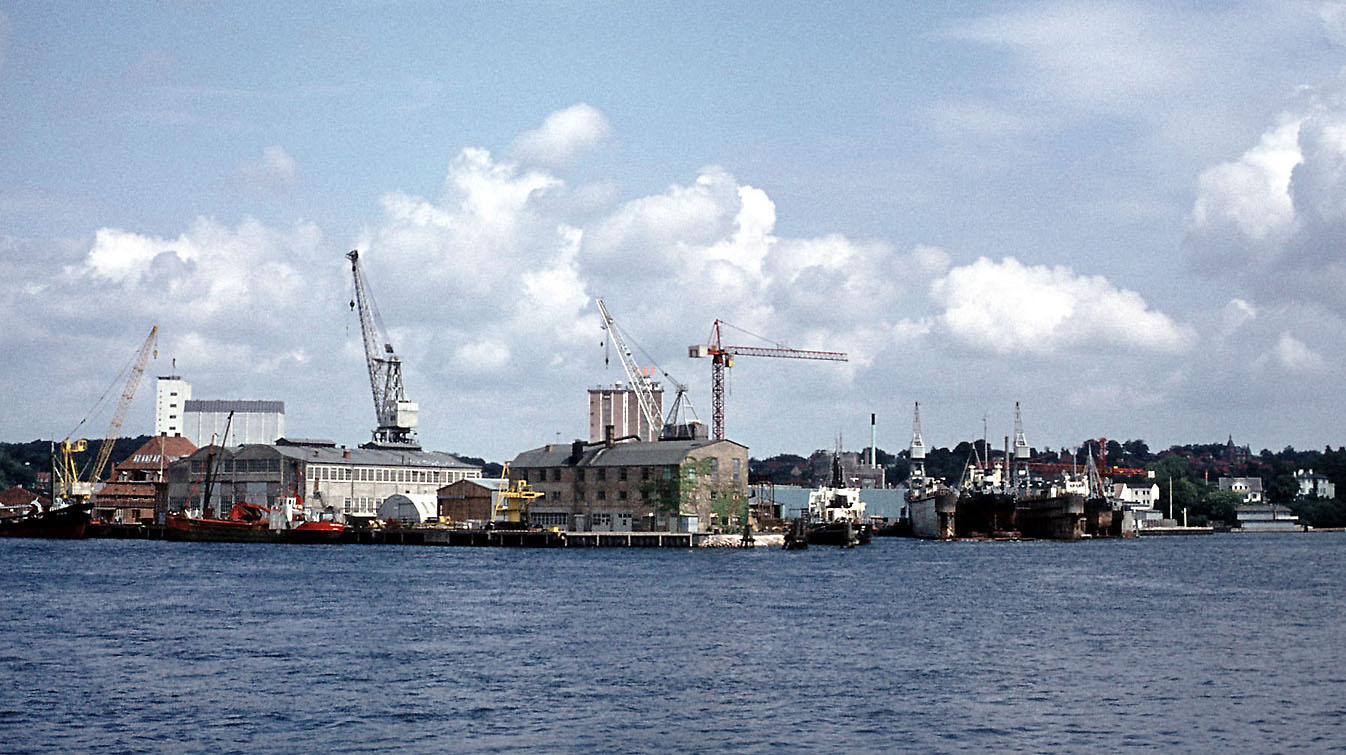
Svendborg Skibsværft

Svendborg Skibsværft (Svendborg Shipyard) was a shipyard, which was located at Frederiksø in Svendborg, Denmark. It was founded in 1907 and closed in 2001, after building close to 200 ships.

== History ==
Svendborg Shipyard was founded in 1907 by ship builder George Ring Andersen, who along with his three brothers started making steel ships as a supplement to the wood ship yards already present at Frederiksø.

21 steel ships were produced until 1916 when machine workshops were added to ship building. In 1925 the yard went bankrupt, but new capital were raised by local businesses and marked a new prosperous period with several orders specializing in mid-size ferries for islands like Langeland and Ærø.

After the second world war, shipping magnate A.P. Møller bought a large share of the stocks intending to merge the yard with Odense Steel Shipyard, but it was later bought by A/S Carl Nielsen. Under the leadership of former ØK-director Per Glente the yard expanded reaching a peak in the period 1988-1992 when the Royal Danish Navy ordered four new Ocean Patrol Vessels. Efforts were made to sell similar ships to South Africa and other countries, but after the production of two coastal trading vessels no more ships were ordered before the company was declared bankrupt in 1999. A series of attempts were made to keep production on site but in 2001 the site at Frederiksø in Svendborg was ultimately closed.

The yard produced around 200 new ships in its 92 years of operation.
