= Ants Laaneots =

Estonian officer and politician (born 1948)

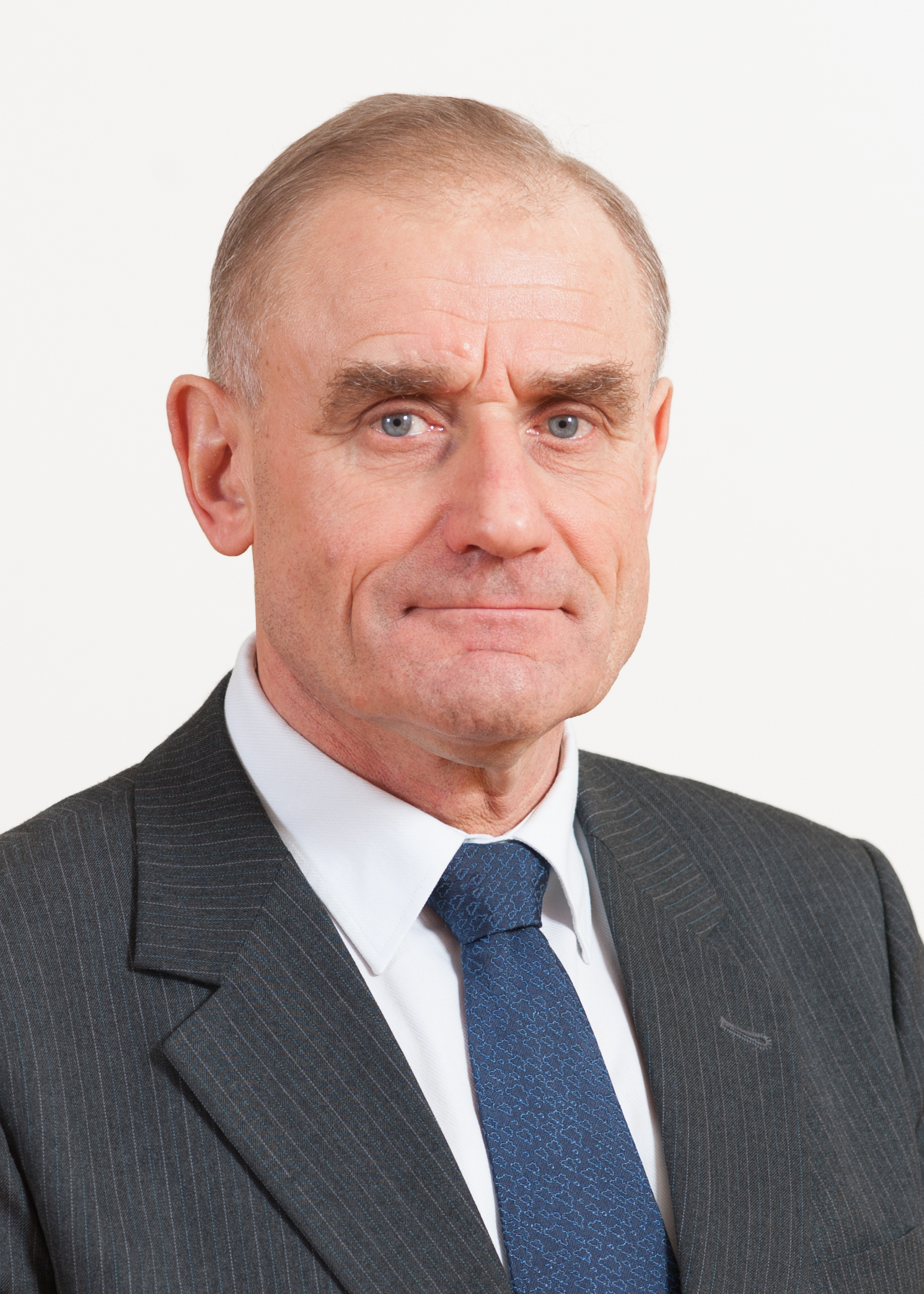
- Ants Laaneots in 2015

Commander of the Estonian Defence Forces
- In office 5 December 2006 – 5 December 2011
- President: Toomas Hendrik Ilves
- Preceded by: Tarmo Kõuts
- Succeeded by: Riho Terras

Member of the Riigikogu
- In office 2015–2024
- Constituency: Electoral District No. 10

Personal details
- Born: 16 January 1948 (age 78) Kilingi-Nõmme, then part of Estonian SSR, Soviet Union

Military service
- Allegiance: Soviet Union (1966–1991); Estonia (1991–2011)
- Branch/service: Soviet Army; Estonian Land Forces
- Years of service: 1966–2011
- Rank: General
- Commands: Estonian Defence Forces; Estonian National Defence College
- Battles/wars: Ethiopian Civil War
- Awards: 1st Class of the Order of the Cross of the Eagle; Commander Grand Cross of the Order of the Lion of Finland; Commander 1st class of the Order of the Polar Star; Commander Degree of the Legion of Merit

Ants Laaneots (born 16 January 1948) is an Estonian politician and former military officer. He was previously the Commander of the Estonian Defence Forces and a veteran officer in the Soviet Army. Laaneots previously served as the Commandant of the Estonian National Defence College from 2001 to 2006. He was appointed the Commander-in-Chief on 5 December 2006 and was promoted to general in 2011. After retiring from the military, he became a politician.

== Early life and education ==
Laaneots was born on 16 January 1948 in Kilingi-Nõmme, Estonia. In 1948 the NKVD arrested his father for being a forest brother. For that he was deported to Siberia between 1949 and 1958. His mother died there in 1952. A year after finishing school, he worked as an assistant to a railway mechanic at Pääsküla railway station. In July 1966 he entered the Higher Military School in Kharkiv, Ukraine, and graduated in 1970 as an Army Tank Officer assigned to the Kiev Military District. He specialized in the T-64 Tank.

== Military career ==
From 1970 to 1978, he served as a platoon leader, company commander, and battalion commander of the 300th Tank Regiment for the Soviet Army in Ukraine, mostly commanding fleets of T-64 Tanks. From 1978 to 1981, Laaneots studied in the Malinovsky Military Academy of Armored Forces (Военная академия бронетанковых войск им. Р. Я. Малиновского) in Moscow for an armored brigade commander's course, and to qualify on the newly introduced T-80 Tank. From 1981 to 1987, he was posted to the Soviet-Chinese border in Eastern Kazakhstan. During this assignment he served as the Executive Officer of the 96th Tank Regiment, two years as the Commander of the 180th Tank Regiment, and three years as the Deputy Commander-Chief of Staff of the 78th Armored Division.

From 1987 to 1989, he deployed to Ethiopia where he spent one year as the military advisor to the commander of an infantry division, and a year and a half as the military advisor to the commanding general of an army corps participating in combat activities. Before his resignation from the Soviet Army in September 1991, he served as the Chief of Regional Department of Defence, Tartu in Estonia.

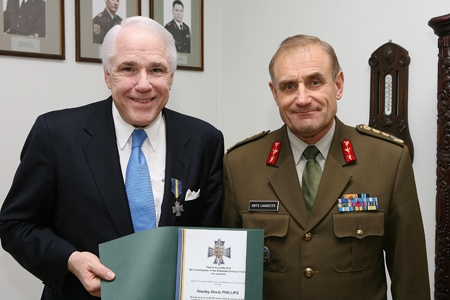
kindralleitnant (English: lieutenant general) Laaneots Commander-in-Chief of the Estonian Defence Forces (r) with Stanley Davis Phillips, US Ambassador to Estonia

=== After 1991 ===
Laaneots was one of the founding-officers of the Estonian Army, defecting from the Soviet Army after the August 1991 attempted coup in Moscow. After Estonia regained its independence in 1991, Laaneots served two times as the Chief of the General Staff – from 1991 to 1994, and from 1997 to 1999. He was crucial in transforming the doctrine and tactics of the Estonian Defence Forces from a Soviet mode to a NATO and western mode. From 1994 to 1996 he was in reserve (Director of the Security company AS ESS Lõuna). In 1997 Laaneots was appointed to the position of Inspector General of the Defence Forces. During his second tenure, in 1998, he graduated from the NATO Defence College in Rome, Italy.

In 1998, he was promoted to kindralmajor (English: Major general). In 2000, after a year at the course in the Finnish National Defence College, he was appointed the head of the Baltic Defence Research Centre located in Estonia. From September 2001 through to December 2006, he was Commandant of the Estonian National Defence College. Ants Laaneots was appointed the Commander of the Defence Forces on 5 December 2006. He stepped down as Commander of the Defence Forces on 5 December 2011 after his 5-year term ended.

== Politics ==
As of 12 December 2011, he worked as prime minister Andrus Ansip's advisor in matters of national defence. That job ended on 28 March 2014 at the end of Andrus Ansip's term in office. Laaneots joined the Reform Party in late 2014. In the 2015 parliamentary election, Laaneots was elected to the parliament with 5,907 individual votes.

In 2016, after NATO soldiers in Estonia were targeted with racist insults by locals, Laaneots stated that Russians directed the vitriol in order to compromise the relationship between Estonia and the U.S.

== Effective dates of promotion ==
=== Soviet Army ===
See Military ranks of the Soviet Union

Promotions
Insignia	Rank	Date
	Lieutenant (лейтена́нт)	1970
	Senior Lieutenant (ста́рший лейтена́нт)	1973
	Captain (капита́н)	1975
	Major (майо́р)	1979
	Lieutenant Colonel (подполко́вник)	1982
	Colonel (полко́вник)	1987

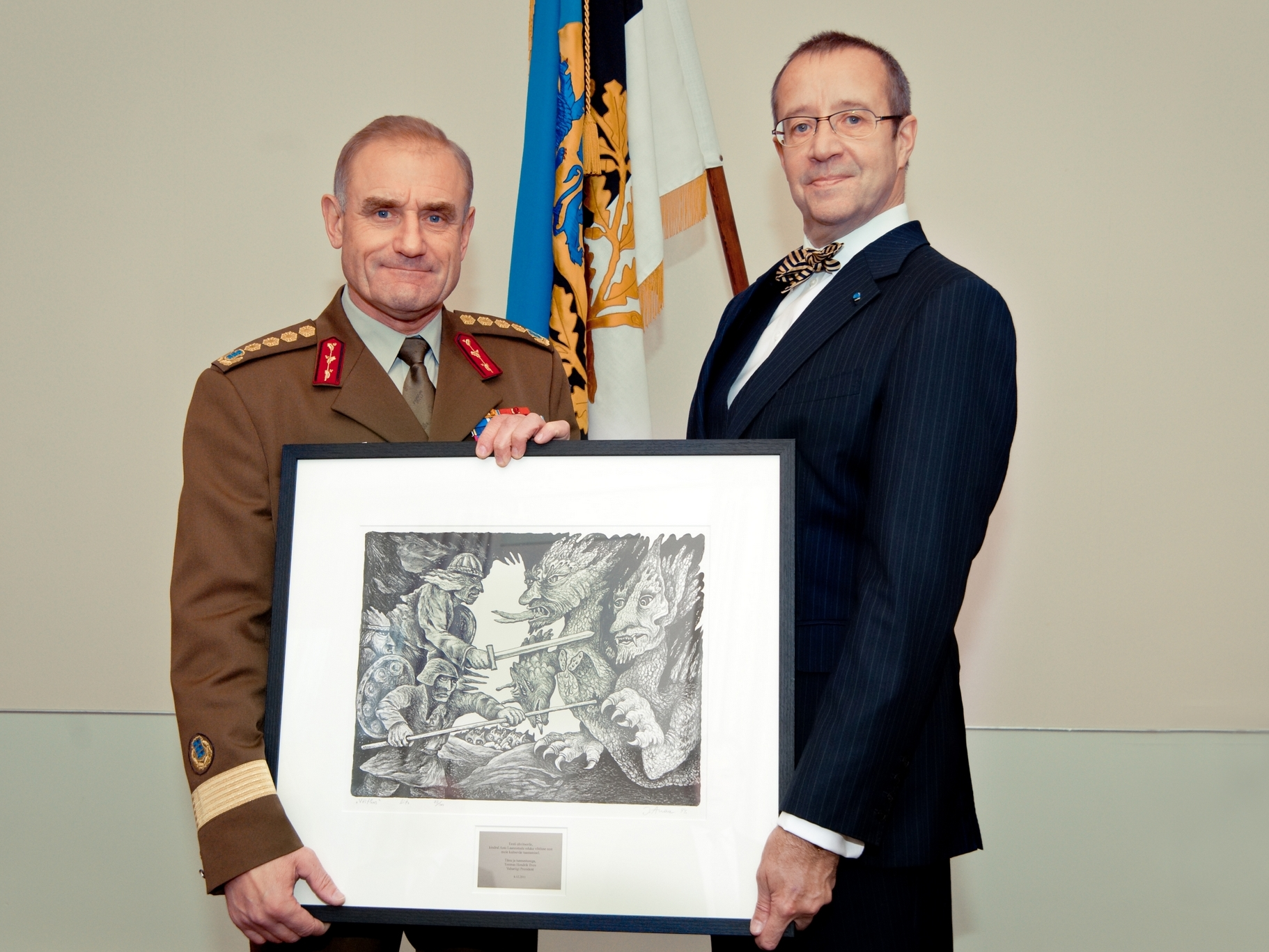
President Toomas Hendrik Ilves giving Ants Laaneots an artwork from Jüri Arrak in December 2011.

=== Estonian Army ===
See Military ranks of Estonia

Promotions
Insignia	Rank	Date
	Colonel (kolonel)	1992
	Major General (kindralmajor)	19 June 1998
	Lieutenant General (kindralleitnant)	18 February 2008
	General (kindral)	16 June 2011

== Awards, decorations, and recognition ==
=== Awards and decorations ===
Estonian Awards and decorations
1st Class of the Order of the Cross of the Eagle	23 February 2012
2nd Class of the Order of the Cross of the Eagle	23 February 2000
White Cross of the Estonian Defence League (I class)	11 November 2011
White Cross of the Estonian Defence League (III class)	
Cross of Merit of the Ministry of Defence (I class)	23 February 2011
Distinguished Service Decoration of the EDF	23 February 1998
Order of Merit of the Estonian Defence Forces	18 February 2005
Gold Cross of the Officer of Land Forces	
Navy decoration " Belief and the Will " Class II " Silver Anchor "	
Estonian Defence Forces General Staff Cross of Merit	12 November 2003
Merit Medal of the Defence League Special Class	
Memorial Medal "10 Years of the Re-Established Defence Forces"	
Armed Resistance Cross of Merit	
The Baltic Defence College Medal of Merit (gold)	
NCO School Medal of Merit	
Memorial Cross "Spearhead Admiral Pitka"	
Distinguished Service Decoration of the Police and Border Guard Board	22 October 2010
Police Cross of Merit 2nd class	2007
Golden Cross of the Rescue Board	
Border Guard Cross of Merit II Class	16 June 1999
Memorial Medal 10 Years of the Re-Established Border Guard (I Class)	
Cross of the Estonian Reserve Officers' Assembly (gold)	12 June 2001
Admiral Johan Pitka Brothers-in-Arms Club Medal of Merit	
St. George's Night Great Star	2007
Foreign Awards
Commander Grand Cross of the Order of the Lion of Finland	(Finland)
Commander Degree of the Legion of Merit	4 July 2012 (U.S.)
Commander 1st class of the Order of the Polar Star	18 January 2011 (Sweden)
Commemorative Medal of the Minister of Defense of the Slovak Republic First Class	15 November 2011 (Slovakia)
Order of the Red Star	(Soviet Union)
Jubilee Medal "In Commemoration of the 100th Anniversary of the Birth of Vladimir Ilyich Lenin"	(Soviet Union)
Jubilee Medal "50 Years of the Armed Forces of the USSR"	(Soviet Union)
Jubilee Medal "60 Years of the Armed Forces of the USSR"	(Soviet Union)
Jubilee Medal "70 Years of the Armed Forces of the USSR"	(Soviet Union)
Medal "For Impeccable Service" 1st class	(Soviet Union)
Medal "For Impeccable Service" 2nd class	(Soviet Union)
Medal "For Impeccable Service" 3rd class	(Soviet Union)

Badges
The Order of Merit of Estonian Border Guard "Sword and Lynx"	29 December 1993
The Board of Elders of the Estonian Defence League member badge	

== Personal life ==
His main research interests include modern conflicts, conflicts involving small states/nations, development of national defence. Since 1999, he has 48 publications, among others 1 monograph, 3 academic papers published in international journals and 15 other academic papers.

In addition to the Estonian language, General Laaneots is fluent in English, Russian, Belarusian, and Finnish. He is an active member of the Estonian National Defence League and the Rotary Club. He is married to a Ukrainian-Moldovan woman named Natalia and has a son and a daughter (and four grandchildren).

Military offices
Preceded by Aleksander Jaakson	Chief of the General Staff; 1991-1994,1997-1999	Succeeded by Aarne Ermus
Preceded by Ants Kiviselg	Commandant of the Estonian National Defence College; 2001-2006	Succeeded by Viljar Schiff
Preceded by Tarmo Kõuts	Commander of the Defence Forces; 2006–2011	Succeeded by Riho Terras
