= Martin Herem =

Estonian military personnel

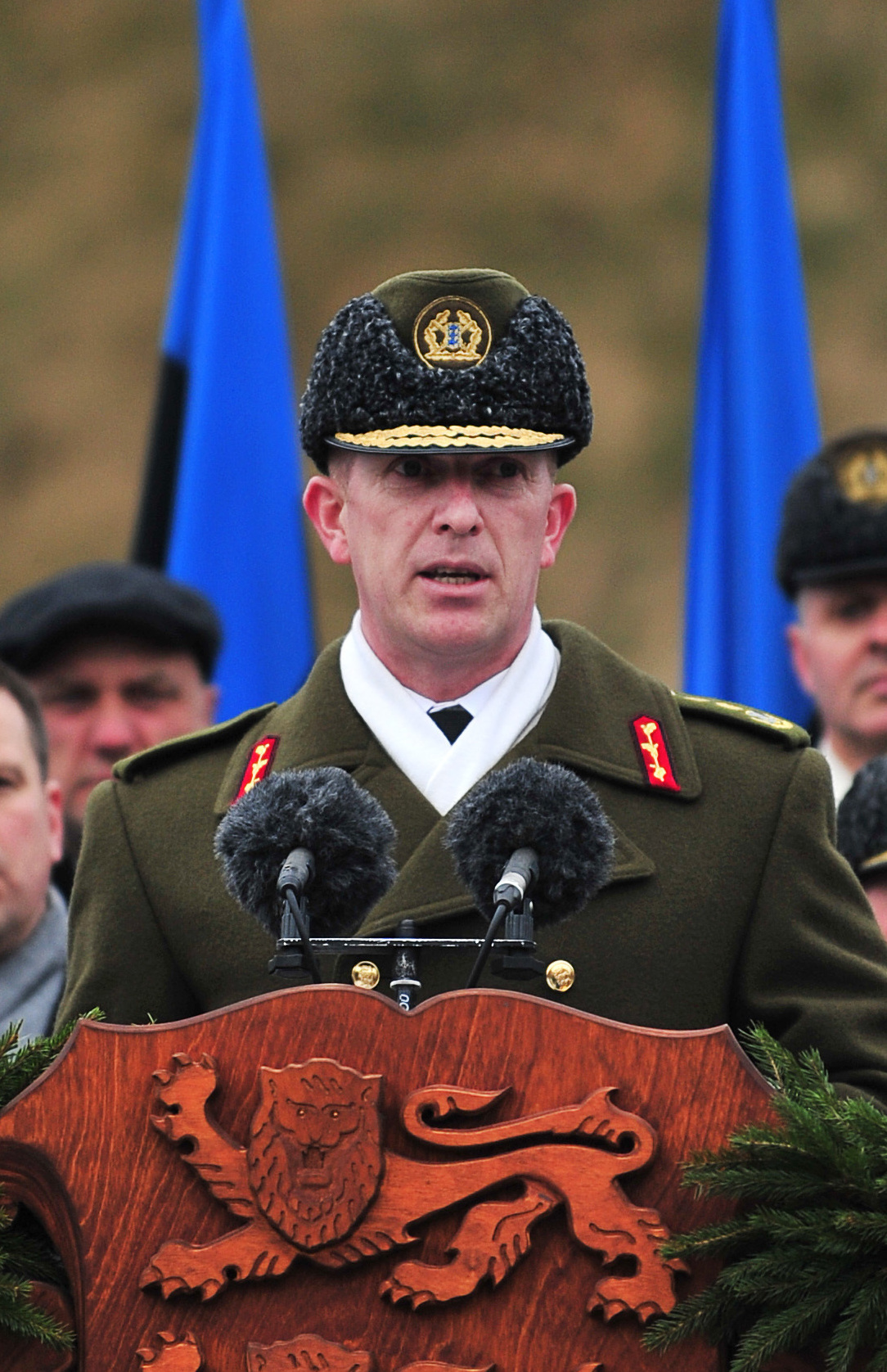
- General Martin Herem in 2019

Minister of Defence
- Incumbent
- Assumed office 16 September 2026
- Prime Minister: Kristen Michal
- Preceded by: Hanno Pevkur

Commander of the Estonian Defence Forces
- In office 5 December 2018 – 30 June 2024
- President: Kersti Kaljulaid; Alar Karis
- Preceded by: Riho Terras
- Succeeded by: Andrus Merilo

Personal details
- Born: 17 December 1973 (age 52) Tallinn, then part of Estonian SSR, Soviet Union

Military service
- Allegiance: Estonia
- Branch/service: Estonian Land Forces
- Years of service: 1992–2024
- Rank: General
- Commands: Headquarters of the Estonian Defence Forces; Estonian National Defence College; Northeast Defense District
- Battles/wars: Iraq War
- Awards: See: Awards and decorations

Martin Herem (born 17 December 1973) is an Estonian General and currently serves as Minister of Defence. He was the Commander of the Estonian Defence Forces from 2018 to 2024.

Herem entered into service in 1992. From 2013 to 2016 he served as the Commandant of the Estonian National Defence College and from 2016 to 2018 Chief of Staff of the Headquarters of the Estonian Defence Forces. Herem was one of the re-founding members of the paramilitary Estonian Defence League in 1990.

On 24 January 2023, Martin Herem was promoted to the rank of general.

Herem became the Commander of the Estonian Defence Forces in December 2018. His tenure was extended for another two years in October 2022, in the interests of stability in the backdrop of the Russian invasion of Ukraine. On 16 January 2024, Herem announced his plan to step down from the post in the summer of 2024, calling the situation stable enough for the change of leadership, which it might not be in the end of his tenure in two years time.

== Military career ==
- 09.1992–06.1996 Estonian National Defence College, cadet
- 07.1996–02.1998 Kuperjanov Single Infantry Battalion, Platoon Leader
- 02.1998–07.1998 Kuperjanov Single Infantry Battalion, Company Executive Officer
- 07.1998–11.1998 Kuperjanov Single Infantry Battalion, S3 Staff Officer
- 11.1998–01.2000 Tartu Single Infantry Battalion, S3 Staff Officer
- 01.2000–07.2000 Tartu Single Infantry Battalion, S3 Staff Commander
- 07.2000–07.2001 Tartu Single Infantry Battalion, Staff Commander
- 08.2002–08.2003 Estonian National Defence College, Instructor of the Tactics Department
- 09.2003–02.2006 Estonian National Defence College, Head of the Tactics Department
- 02.2006–06.2006 Operation Iraqi Freedom II training mission Senior Staff Officer with US brigade
- 06.2006–04.2007 Estonian National Defence College, Head of the Tactics Department
- 04.2007–05.2008 Tapa Training Center, Staff Commander
- 06.2008–07.2012 North-Eastern Defence Command, Commander
- 07.2012–08.2013 Estonian National Defence College, Deputy Commander
- 08.2013–07.2016 Estonian National Defence College, Commandant
- 07.2016–12.2018 Headquarters of the Estonian Defence Forces, Chief of Staff
- 12.2018–06.2024 Commander of the Estonian Defence Forces

== Effective dates of promotion ==
Promotions
Insignia	Rank	Date
	Colonel	18 February 2013
	Brigadier General	15 February 2017
	Major General	14 February 2018
	Lieutenant General	18 February 2021
	General	24 January 2023

== Awards and decorations ==
=== Decorations and badges ===

1st Class of the Order of the Cross of the Eagle		2nd Class of the Order of the Cross of the Eagle
Cross of Merit of the Ministry of Defence (I class)	Cross of Merit of the Ministry of Defence (III class)	Distinguished Service Decoration of the EDF
Order of Merit of the Estonian Defence Forces	Cross for the Exemplary Service of the Estonian Defence Forces	Gold Cross of the Officer of Land Forces
MoD Medal of Participants in International Military Operations	Merit Medal of the Defence League Special Class	Memorial Medal "10 Years of the Re-Established Defence Forces"
Distinguished Service Decoration of the Eastern Prefecture	Silver Cross of the Rescue Board	Estonian Defence League School Cross of Merit
Cross of the Estonian Reserve Officers’ Assembly (special)	Cross of the Estonian Reserve Officers’ Assembly (gold)	Cross of the Estonian Reserve Officers’ Assembly (silver)
Former Estonian Forest Brothers Association Service Cross III class	Badge of Honor of the Freedom Oak Wreath	1st Class of the Order of Viesturs
2nd Class of the Order of Merit	Commandeur of the National Order of the Legion of Honour	Bronze Star Medal

Badges
Combat Action Badge (United States)
Baltic Defence College Higher Command Studies Course graduate Badge
Baltic Defence College Joint Command and General Staff Course graduate Badge
Estonian National Defence College Advanced Officer Training Course Badge
The Order of Merit of Kuperjanov Battalion

== Personal life ==
Martin Herem is married and has a son and two daughters. He is one of the grandchildren of Harri Moora. One of his hobbies is marathon running. He has participated in the organisation of the Järvakandi marathon. He is fluent in English and Russian as foreign languages. He is also one of the re-establishers of the Estonian Defence League in Rapla.

Military offices
Preceded by Aarne Ermus	Commandant of the Estonian National Defence College; 2013–2016	Succeeded by Enno Mõts
Preceded by Igor Schvede	Chief of Staff of the Headquarters of the Estonian Defence Forces; 2016–2018	Succeeded by Veiko-Vello Palm
Preceded by Riho Terras	Commander of the Estonian Defence Forces; 2018–2024	Succeeded by Andrus Merilo
