= Riho Terras =

Estonian politician and military officer (born 1967)

Riho Terras MEP
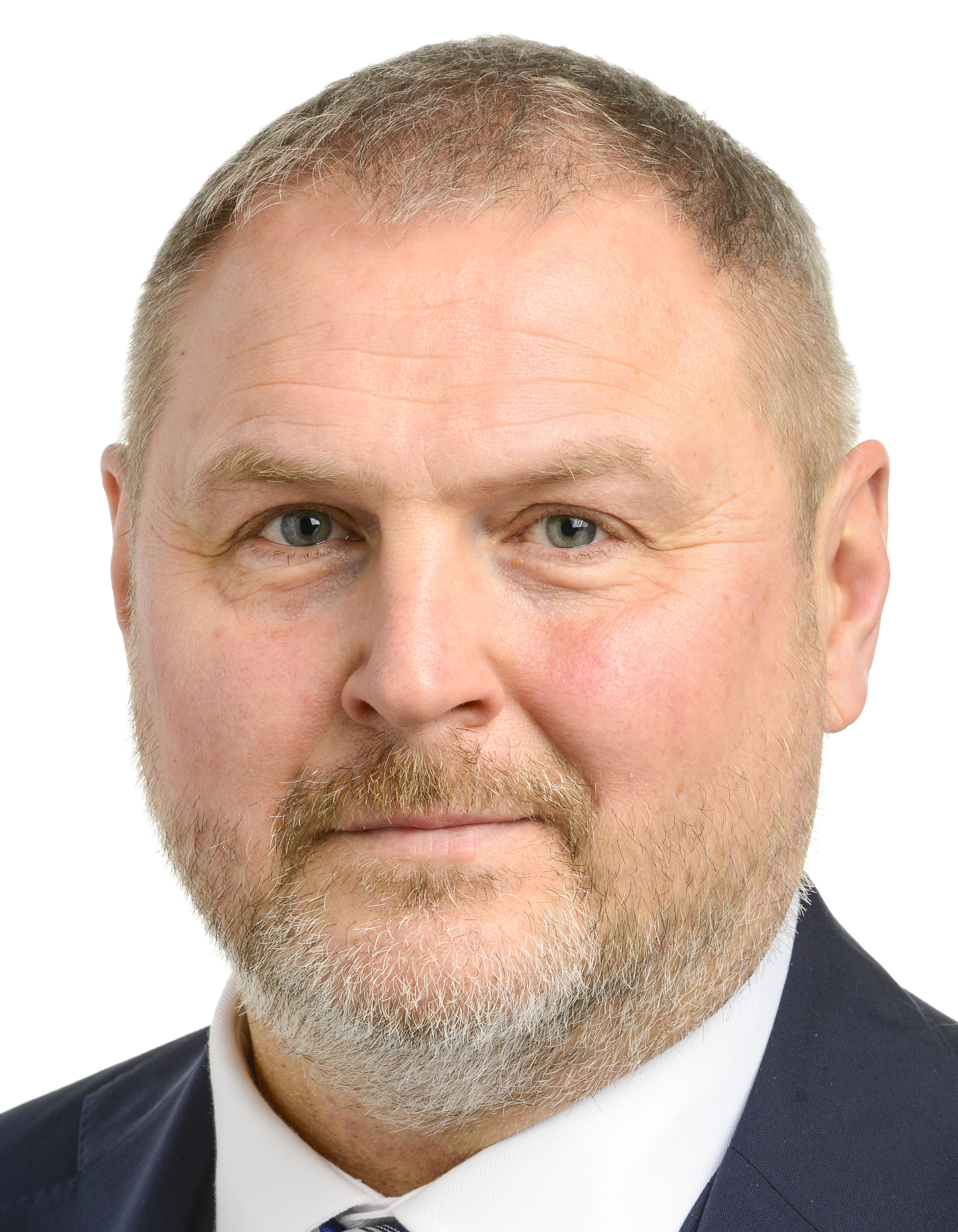
- Official portrait, 2024

Member of the European Parliament for Estonia
- Incumbent
- Assumed office 1 February 2020

Commander of the Estonian Defence Forces
- In office 5 December 2011 – 5 December 2018
- President: Toomas Hendrik Ilves; Kersti Kaljulaid
- Preceded by: Ants Laaneots
- Succeeded by: Martin Herem

Personal details
- Born: 17 April 1967 (age 59) Kohtla-Järve, then part of Estonian SSR, Soviet Union
- Party: Isamaa
- Education: University of Tartu; University of the Bundeswehr Munich

Military service
- Allegiance: Estonia
- Branch/service: Estonian Land Forces
- Years of service: 1991–2018
- Rank: General
- Battles/wars: Iraq War

Riho Terras (born 17 April 1967) is an Estonian politician and a former military officer who is serving as a member of the European Parliament since 1 February 2020. He was the Commander of the Estonian Defence Forces from 2011 to 2018. He was promoted to general in 2017.

He was elected as a Member of the European Parliament in 2019 and took his seat after Brexit.

== Early life and career ==
He was born on April 17, 1967, in the city of Kohtla-Jarve in the Estonian Soviet Socialist Republic. Terras graduated in 1985 from Kohtla-Järve 5th Middle School. In his youth, Terras was conscripted as a sailor in the Soviet Navy, serving with the Northern Fleet on the frigate Zadornyy. He later studied history at University of Tartu, during which he also became a member of the Estonian Defence League. He joined Johannes Kert in the defence of radio and television buildings in Tallinn during the 1991 Soviet coup d'état attempt. Due to a lack of personnel in the Defence League, he decided to join a course for reserve officers, where he studied alongside Leo Kunnas. He was soon persuaded by Ants Laaneots to become a member of the Estonian Defence Forces. In 1994, he started studying at the University of the Bundeswehr Munich, where he received a master's degree in Political Science and Sociology. Thus, he picked up where he had left off in his education after his time at the University of Tartu.

== Military career ==
His military education includes studies in the Royal College of Defence Studies in the United Kingdom, the Joint Command and General Staff Course in the Baltic Defence College, the European Security. Policy Course in the Geneva Centre for Security Policy, a Battalion Commander's Course in Switzerland, a Company Commander's course in Germany, a Company Commander's course in Sweden and the Officer's Basic course in Estonia. Terras's civilian education includes history studies in the University of Tartu, and a master's degree in Political Science and Sociology from the University of the Bundeswehr Munich.

After graduating from the Basic Officer's Course in Estonia, Terras served as a Company Commander and as a Battalion Second in Command of the Kalev Single Infantry Battalion from 1992 to 1993. Between 1993 and 1994 Terras served as the commander of the Põhja Single Infantry Company. After graduating from the University of the Bundeswehr Munich (Germany) he served as the commander of the Guard Battalion from 1998 to 2000. Terras was appointed the Chief of Staff of the Defence League Headquarters in 2000. From 2001 to 2004 he served as the Estonian Defence Attaché in Germany and Poland. Between 2005 and 2008 Terras served as the Chief of the Analysis and Planning Department and as Chief of the Planning Section, Analysis and Planning Department in the Estonian Defence Forces Headquarters. In 2007, Terras served in the NATO Training Mission - Iraq as Deputy Chief of Staff. Riho Terras was confirmed in December 2008 as Permanent Secretary of the Estonian Ministry of Defence. Before taking up the position of the Permanent Secretary, he was Deputy Chief of Staff for Operations in the Estonian Defence Forces. Terras served as the Deputy Chief of Staff for Operations of the Estonian Defence forces from January 2011 to March 2011 and then continued his service as the Chief of Staff of the Estonian Defence Forces. Terras was appointed the Chief of Defence on 5 December 2011.

== Education ==
- 1989-1993, University of Tartu, History studies, Tartu, Estonia
- 1991-1992, Officer's Basic course, Tallinn, Estonia
- 1993, Company Commander's course, Sweden
- 1996, Company Commander's course, Germany
- 1994-1998, University of the Bundeswehr Munich, master's degree in Political Science and Sociology, Munich, Germany
- 1999, Battalion Commander's Course, Switzerland
- 2000, Estonian National Defence Course, Tartu, Estonia
- 2000, Geneva Centre for Security Policy, Policy Course, Geneva, Switzerland
- 2005, Baltic Defence College, Joint Command and General Staff Course, Tartu, Estonia
- 2010, Royal College of Defence Studies, London, United Kingdom

== Effective dates of promotion ==
Promotions
Insignia	Rank	Date
	Second Lieutenant	February 1992
	First Lieutenant	23 November 1993
	Captain	20 June 1996
	Major	18 February 2000
	Lieutenant Colonel	20 June 2005
	Colonel	1 December 2008
	Brigadier General	16 June 2011
	Major General	18 February 2013
	Lieutenant General	5 February 2015
	General	20 February 2017

=== Assignment History ===
From	To	Assignments
March 1992	November 1992	Company Commander, Kalev Infantry Battalion, Estonian Land Forces, Estonia Defence Forces
November 1992	November 1993	Battalion Second in Command, Kalev Infantry Battalion, Estonian Land Forces, Estonia Defence Forces
December 1993	January 1994	Commander, Põhja Single Infantry Company, Estonian Land Forces, Estonia Defence Forces
May 1998	January 2000	Commander, Guard Battalion (Estonia), Estonian Land Forces, Estonia Defence Forces
January 2000	December 2000	Chief of Staff, Estonian Defence League
December 2000	July 2004	Estonian Defence Attaché in Germany and Poland
August 2005	January 2006	Chief of the Planning Section, Analysis and Planning Department, General Staff of the Estonian Defence Forces, Estonia Defence Forces
January 2006	January 2007	Chief of the Analysis and Planning Department, General Staff of the Estonian Defence Forces, Estonia Defence Forces
February 2007	September 2007	Deputy Chief of Staff, NATO Training Mission – Iraq
September 2007	February 2008	Chief of the Analysis and Planning Department, General Staff of the Estonian Defence Forces, Estonia Defence Forces
February 2008	November 2008	Deputy Chief of Staff for Operations, General Staff of the Estonian Defence Forces, Estonia Defence Forces
December 2008	December 2010	Permanent Secretary, Ministry of Defence (Estonia)
January 2011	February 2011	Deputy Chief of Staff for Operations, General Staff of the Estonian Defence Forces, Estonia Defence Forces
18 February 2011	4 December 2011	Chief of Staff, General Staff of the Estonian Defence Forces, Estonia Defence Forces
5 December 2011	5 December 2018	Commander of the Defence Forces, Estonia Defence Forces

== Awards, decorations, and recognition ==
=== Awards and decorations ===
Estonian Awards and decorations
1st Class of the Order of the Cross of the Eagle	5 February 2018
4th Class of the Order of the Cross of the Eagle	23 February 2005
White Cross of the Estonian Defence League (III class)	
The First Class of the Cross of Merit of the Estonian Ministry of Defence	28 November 2018
Ministry of Defence Cross of Merit 2nd Class	
Distinguished Service Decoration of the EDF	22 February 1999
Navy decoration " Belief and the Will " Class III " Bronze Anchor "	
Distinguished Service Decoration of the Estonian Defence League	
Estonian Defence Forces General Staff Cross of Merit	
MoD Medal of Participants in International Military Operations	
Merit Medal of the Defence League III Class	
Memorial Medal "10 Years of the Re-Established Defence Forces"	
Victory Fire Carrier Medal	
Distinguished Service Decoration of the Information Board (II class)	
The Baltic Defence College Medal of Merit (gold)	
Police Cross of Merit 2nd class	2017
Special Service Cross of Estonian Defence League School	
Cross of the Estonian Reserve Officers’ Assembly (special)	29 November 2019
Cross of the Estonian Reserve Officers’ Assembly (gold)	4 December 2018
Cross of the Estonian Reserve Officers’ Assembly (silver)	12 June 2001
Foreign Awards
Commander Degree of the Legion of Merit	13 November 2018 (USA)
Commander with Star of the Norwegian Order of Merit	10 September 2015 (Norway)
Commander Grand Cross of the Order of the Lion of Finland	13 May 2014 (Finland)
Commandery of the Order of Merit of the Republic of Poland	18 March 2014 (Poland)
Officier of the National Order of the Legion of Honour	4 September 2013 (France)
Knight Commander's Cross of the Order of Merit of the Federal Republic of Germany	9 July 2013 (Germany)
1st Class of the Order of Viesturs	5 June 2012 (Latvia)
Gold Cross of Honour of the Bundeswehr	20 April 2011 (Germany)
NATO Medal for the NATO Training Mission in Iraq	
Merit Medal of the Finnish Reserve Officers' Federation	
OSMTH Grand Priory of Scandinavia Pro Merito medal	

Badges
BaltDefCol Joint Command and General Staff Course Badge
Baltic Defence College Joint Command and General Staff Course graduate Badge
Basic Officer’s Course graduate Badge
The Order of Merit of Guard Battalion
The Order of Merit of the Intelligence Center
10 year service badge of Defense League unit in Tallinn

== Personal ==
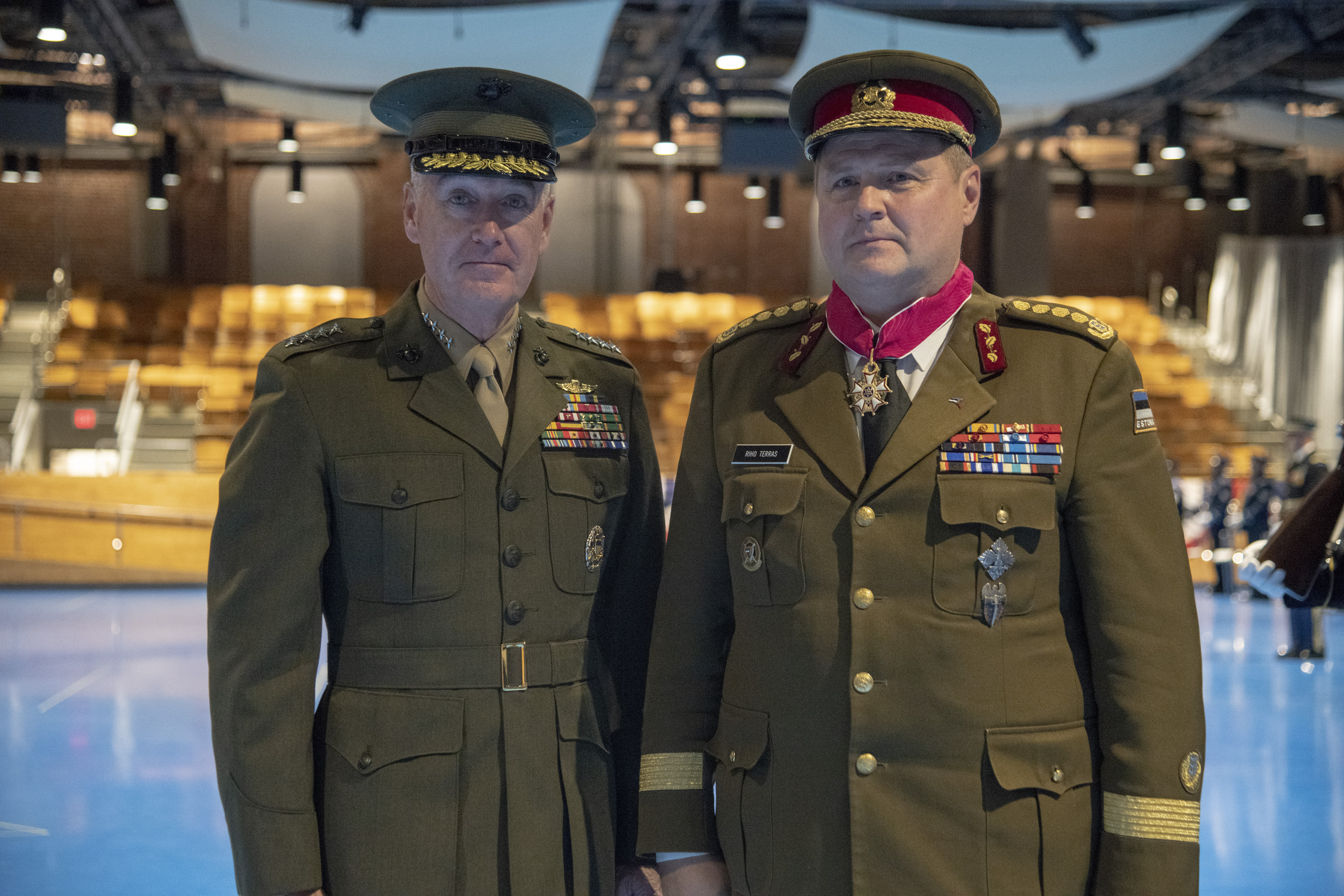
General Joseph Dunford with General Terras during a full honor arrival ceremony at Joint Base Myer-Henderson Hall, 13 November 2018.

In addition to the Estonian language Terras is fluent in English, German and Russian. He is married with two sons. His wife Kaili is an Ambassador-at-large in the Ministry of Foreign Affairs for Education. His eldest son, politician Hendrik Johannes Terras, was named in honor of Johannes Kert and his younger offspring is named after the Estonian god of weather and harvest Uku. His hobbies include opera, medieval history and hunting.

Military offices
Preceded by Neeme Väli	Chief of the General Staff; 2011	Succeeded by Peeter Hoppe
Preceded by Ants Laaneots	Commander of the Defence Forces; 2011–2018	Succeeded by Martin Herem
