= Aleksander Jaakson =

Estonian military personnel and politician

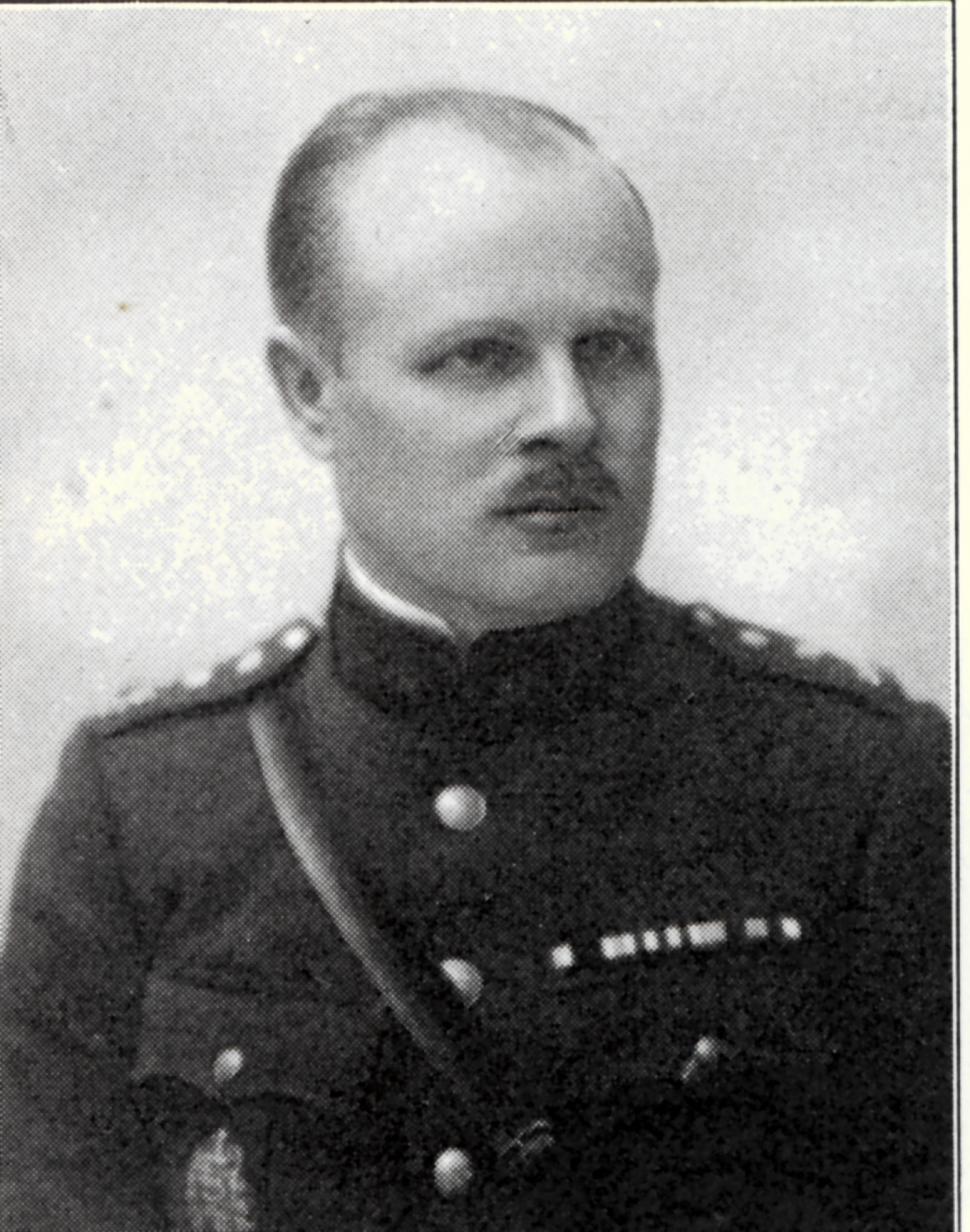
- Aleksander Jaakson
- Born: 29 January 1892; Holdre, Kreis Fellin, Governorate of Livonia, Russian Empire
- Died: 2 October 1942 (aged 50); Kirov, Russian SFSR, Soviet Union
- Military career
- Allegiance: (Russia) Russian Empire/Russian Republic; Estonia
- Branch: Imperial Russian Army; Estonian Army
- Service years: Russia: 1915–1917; Estonia: 1918–1940
- Rank: Major general
- Conflicts: World War I Estonian War of Independence
- Awards: See below

Aleksander Jaakson (29 January 1892 – 2 October 1942) was an Estonian general and educator. After beginnings as a teacher in Türi, he served with the Imperial Russian Army in World War I, and was advanced to staff captain. During the disintegration of the Russian Republic in 1917, he returned home to establish a branch of the Estonian Defence League. He was a decorated participant in the Estonian War of Independence and later continued serving in the Estonian Defence Forces in various positions, including military education.

Jaakson was the Estonian minister of education from 1936 to 1939, contributing to the establishment of various institutions—including Tallinn Technical University and the Estonian Academy of Sciences. His final contributions were as the last Chief of Staff of the Estonian Army, in which capacity he served from 1939 to 1940, reaching the rank of major general. With the onset of Soviet occupation, he was arrested by NKVD in 1940 and killed at Kirov two years later.

== Biography ==
Aleksander Jaakson was born on 29 January 1892 in a family of a manor worker in Holdre Parish (now Tõrva Parish), Kreis Fellin, in the Governorate of Livonia of the Russian Empire. He studied in Holdre village school, in Helme parish school, and in Tartu Teachers' Seminar. From 1913 to 1915 Jaakson worked as a teacher in Türi parish school and Nõmmküla ministry school.

During World War I, Jaakson was mobilized, entering service in February 1915. He studied in the 4th Petrograd Praporshchik school, receiving the corresponding rank in the Imperial Russian Army, and was then called up to fight on the Eastern Front against the German Empire. In March 1916 he was wounded in combat. Jaakson received multiple promotions, reaching the rank of Staff Captain in January 1917, and was awarded the Order of Saint Anna and Order of Saint Stanislaus. In December 1917, shortly after the October Revolution, he joined the Estonian national reserve battalion of Tartu, though this was disbanded in March of the following year.

In 1918 Jaakson organised a paramilitary defense group, the Estonian Defence League, in Türi. At the start of the Estonian War of Independence on 28 November, he joined the 6th infantry regiment, serving first as a company commander, and from 28 December as the commander of the 2nd battalion. He fought against both the Red Army and the Baltische Landeswehr, and suffered a concussion in June 1919 near Stalbe in Latvia. In October Jaakson was promoted to the rank of captain. For his service in the War of Independence Jaakson was awarded Estonia's Cross of Liberty and Latvia's Order of Lāčplēsis, as well as a farm and 50,000 marks.

After the war Jaakson continued to serve in the Estonian army, serving in several different units, and from August 1922 in the general staff. He studied at officer courses in Estonian Defence College and in French War College. In 1927 he was appointed to the Estonian Defence College, serving in several different positions, including teaching, and in 1933 became its commandant. In 1936 Jaakson graduated cum laude from the Faculty of Law of the University of Tartu. On 18 September 1928 Jaakson married Mary Hovaldt (née Pikk). They adopted son Rein.

In May 1936 Jaakson became Estonia's minister of education. He introduced several major changes, a university law was adopted, Tartu University's Faculty of Engineering was brought to Tallinn becoming Tallinn Technical University, and defence institutes were established to both universities. Under his tenure in 1938, the Estonian Academy of Sciences was founded. In October 1939 Jaakson became the chief of general staff, and in February 1940 was promoted to the rank of major general.

In June 1940 Soviet occupation authorities removed Jaakson from his post. He turned to managing his farm in Valga County, but on 18 October was arrested by NKVD on his farm's field. In June 1941 he was transferred to Kirov Oblast, where he was killed in a prison camp at Kirov city (Vyatka) on 2 October 1942. His place of burial is unknown. He was survived by Mary and Rein, both of them escaping to the West in 1944.

== Honors ==
Jaakson received the Russian Order of Saint Anna 4th class and the Order of Saint Stanislaus 3rd class for his service in the World War I. His contribution to the Estonian War of Independence also earned him the Estonian Cross of Liberty 1st grade 3rd class and the Latvian Order of Lāčplēsis 3rd class. Additionally in peacetime he received Estonian Order of the White Star 1st Class, Order of the Cross of the Eagle 3rd class, and various foreign awards from Latvia, Belgium, Finland, Hungary, Lithuania, Poland, and Sweden. Jaakson participated in public life belonging to several organisations, including being an honorary member of Estonian Naturalists' Society.

== Bibliography ==
- Jaska, Vello (2012). "Kindalmajor Aleksander Jaakson väärib mälestuskivi". Kaitse Kodu! (in Estonian) (2). Estonian Defence League. ISSN 1406-3387.
- Kaevats, Ülo; et al. (2000). Eesti entsüklopeedia 14 (in Estonian). Eesti Entsüklopeediakirjastus. ISBN 9985700643.
- Limberg, Fred (1980). Isamaa eest: Eesti Vabariigi sõjajõudude organisatsioon ja juhtkond (in Estonian). Boreas Publishing House. ISBN 9780906967003.
- Pihlak, Jaak (2007). "Helme kihelkond ja Vabaduse Risti vennad" (PDF). Viljandi Muuseumi Aastaraamat (in Estonian). 11 (1). Museum of Viljandi. ISSN 1406-7498. Archived from the original (PDF) on 4 March 2016.

Political offices
| Preceded by Nikolai Kann | Estonian Minister of Education; 1936–1939 | Succeeded by Paul Kogerman |
