= Urmas Muld =

Estonian military personnel (born 1954)

Urmas Muld (born 1954) is an Estonian military personnel.

He has been the head of Headquarters of the Estonian Defence Forces.

In 2007 he was awarded with Order of the Cross of the Eagle, III class.
