= Tarmo Kõuts =

Estonian military personnel

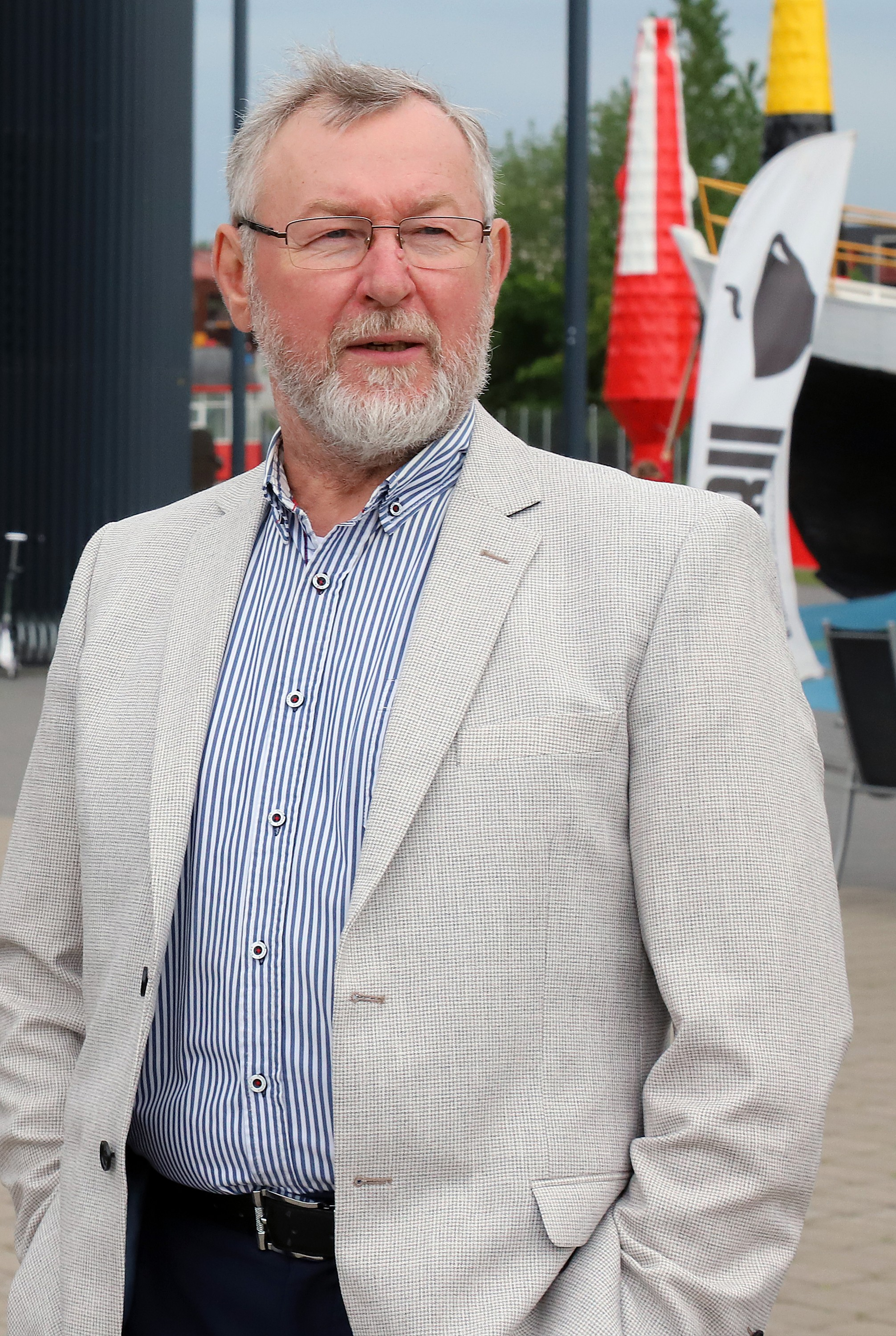
- Kõuts in 2019

Commander of the Estonian Defence Forces
- In office 21 September 2000 – 14 November 2006
- President: Lennart Meri; Arnold Rüütel; Toomas Hendrik Ilves
- Preceded by: Aarne Ermus
- Succeeded by: Ants Laaneots

Personal details
- Born: 27 November 1953 (age 72) Sandla, Pihtla Parish, then part of Estonian SSR, Soviet Union

Military service
- Allegiance: Estonia
- Branch/service: Estonian Navy
- Years of service: 2000–2006
- Rank: Vice admiral
- Commands: Estonian Defence Forces; Estonian Border Guard
- Awards: See: Awards, decorations, and recognition

Tarmo Kõuts (born 27 November 1953) is an Estonian politician and former Commander of the Estonian Defence Forces.

Kõuts graduated from Tallinn Maritime School in 1973 and from Kaliningrad Technical Institute in 1985. From 1973 to 1990 he worked in various positions in the Estonian Shipping Company. He served as the rector of Estonian Maritime Academy from 1990 to 1993 and as the director-general of Estonian Border Guard from 1993 to 2000.

In September 2000, Rear Admiral Kõuts was appointed commander of the Estonian Defence Forces. Having been promoted to the rank of vice admiral in 2002, Kõuts retained the position until 2006, when he stepped down to move into politics. He joined the right-wing Union of Pro Patria and Res Publica and successfully ran for a seat in the parliament in the 2007 elections.

== Effective dates of promotion ==
=== Estonian Defence Forces ===
See Military ranks of Estonia

Promotions
Insignia	Rank	Date
	Captain (Navy) (Mereväekapten)	30 December 1993
	Rear Admiral (Kontradmiral)	19 June 1998
	Vice Admiral (Viitseadmiral)	20 February 2002

== Awards, decorations, and recognition ==
=== Awards and decorations ===
Estonian Awards and decorations
2nd Class of the Order of the National Coat of Arms	2 February 2005
2nd Class of the Order of the Cross of the Eagle	9 February 1998
White Cross of the Estonian Defence League (I class)	2006
White Cross of the Estonian Defence League (III class)	
Cross of Merit of the Ministry of Defence	
Distinguished Service Decoration of the EDF	23 February 1998
Memorial Medal "10 Years of the Re-Established Defence Forces"	
Memorial Cross "Spearhead Admiral Pitka"	
Border Guard Cross of Merit I Class	27 October 1997
Golden Cross of the Rescue Board	
Police Cross of Merit 2nd class	2007
Memorial Medal 10 Years of the Re-Established Border Guard (I Class)	
Women's Voluntary Defence Organization Cross of Lily	
Cross of the Estonian Reserve Officers' Assembly (gold)	6 May 2004
St. George's Night Great Star	2007
Foreign Awards
Commander Grand Cross of the Order of the Lion of Finland	2006 (Finland)
1st Class of the Order of Viesturs	2005 (Latvia)
Commander's Grand Cross of the Order of the Lithuanian Grand Duke Gediminas	30 September 2004 (Lithuania)
Knight Grand Cross of Order of Merit of the Italian Republic	20 April 2004 (Italy)
Grand Cross of the Order of Prince Henry	29 May 2003 (Portugal)
State of Maryland Distinguished Service Cross	(U.S.)
Lithuanian Armed Forces Medal of Merit	(Lithuania)
Latvian Army Medal of Merit I Class	(Latvia)
Latvian Border Guard Cross of Merit II class	(Latvia)
Latvian Border Guard 80 Anniversary Medal	(Latvia)
Finland Border Guard Medal of Merit	(Finland)
Grand Officer of the CISM Order of Merit	(International)
Baltic Assembly Medal	(International)

Badges
Estonian Border Guard badge	23 February 1994
The Order of Merit of Estonian Border Guard "Sword and Lynx"	29 December 1993
Order of Merit of Defense League unit in Tallinn	

Military offices
Preceded by Helmut Kanter	Rector of the Estonian Maritime Academy; 1990-1993	Succeeded by Valdur Aret
Preceded by Andrus Öövel	Director General of the Estonian Border Guard; 1993-2000	Succeeded by Harry Hein
Preceded by Johannes Kert	Commander of the Defence Forces; 2000–2006	Succeeded by Ants Laaneots
