= Veiko-Vello Palm =

Estonian military personnel. 2015–2018 (born 1971)

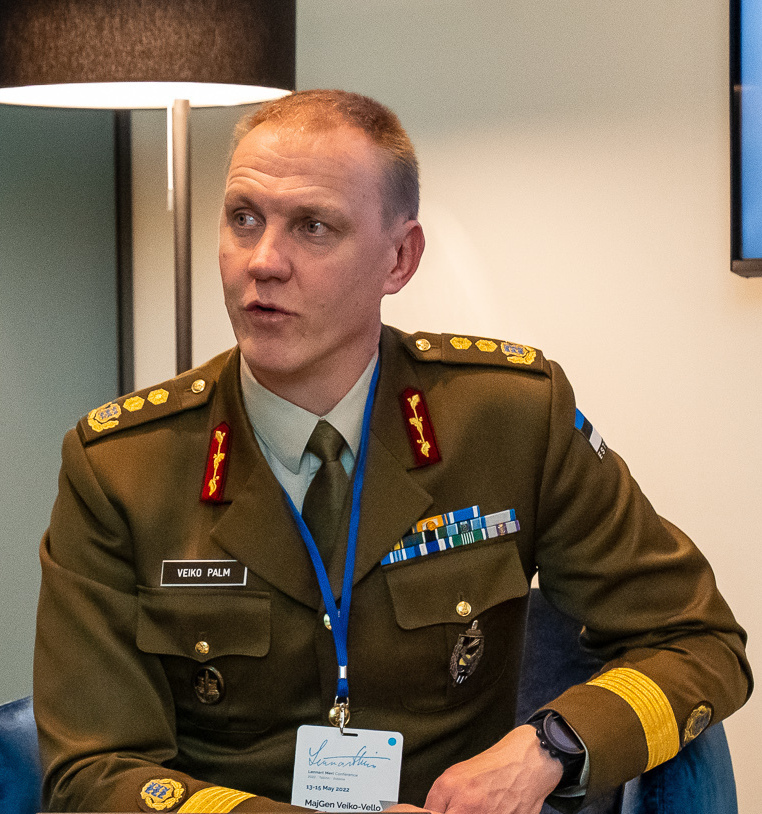
- Veiko-Vello Palm in 2022
- Born: May 29, 1971 (age 55); Tallinn, then part of Estonian SSR, Soviet Union
- Military career
- Allegiance: Estonia
- Branch: Estonian Land Forces
- Service years: 1992–2024
- Rank: Major general
- Commands: Estonian Division; Headquarters of the Estonian Defence Forces; 1st Infantry Brigade
- Conflicts: War in Afghanistan

Veiko-Vello Palm (born on 29 May 1971) is a retired Estonian Major General of the Estonian Defence Forces. He commanded the Estonian Division from 2023 until his retirement in 2024.

== Early life ==
Veiko-Vello Palm was born on 29 May 1971. He attended the Tallinn 21st School, which he graduated in 1989.

== Military career ==
Veiko-Vello Palm started his military career with the Estonian Defence Forces in 1992 as conscript in Kalev Infantry Battalion. Between 1992 and 1994 he studied at the Estonian Academy of Security Sciences. He received his bachelor's degree in 2001 from the National Defence University of Finland, and a master's degree in 2005 from the same university. He has also attended various other courses during his career - officer course in 1996, battalion commander course (armored forces) in 2003, NATO Combat Readiness Evaluation Course in 2007, higher management and higher national defence courses in 2018.

He has served in many various positions throughout his military career. Between 1995 and 1996, he served in the North Single Infantry Company. In 1997, he served as a staff officer in the Headquarters of the Defence Forces. From 2001 to 2002, he served in the Headquarters of the Land Force. After that, until 2003, he worked as a lector in the Estonian Military Academy. Between 2005 and 2007, he served as Chief of Staff in Tapa Training Center. After serving as an International Security Assistance Force staff officer in Afghanistan between 2007 and 2008, he returned to the Headquarters of the Defence Forces. In 2009, he joined the Multinational Corps Northeast as a senior staff officer. During his time with MCN, he served a second stint in Afghanistan with ISAF. He moved on to the Estonian Ministry of Defence as chief of the Defence Planning Department in 2012. In 2015, he became the commander of the 1st Infantry Brigade. In 2018, he was appointed as the Chief of Staff of the Headquarters of the Defence Forces. He was named Deputy Commander of the Estonian Defence Forces in 2021.

In 2023 Palm was appointed the first commander of the Estonian Division.

Palm retired from the Estonian Defence Forces in March 2024.

== Personal life ==
Veiko-Vello Palm is married and has two children. In addition to the Estonian language, he can speak English, Russian, and Finnish.

Military offices
Preceded by Martin Herem	Chief of Staff of the Headquarters of the Estonian Defence Forces; 2018–2021	Succeeded by Enno Mõts
