= Headquarters of the Estonian Defence Forces =

Staff of Estonian Defence Forces

- Eesti Kaitseväe peastaap
- Insignia of the Headquarters of the Estonian Defence Forces
- Active: 1918–1940; 1991–present
- Country: Estonia
- Part of: Estonian Defence Forces
- Garrison/HQ: Juhkentali 58, 15007, Tallinn, Estonia
- Mottos: Viribus unitis (With united forces)
- Anniversaries: 26 November (formed); 31 October (restored)
- Engagements: Estonian War of Independence

Commanders
- Chief of Staff: Major General Vahur Karus

Insignia
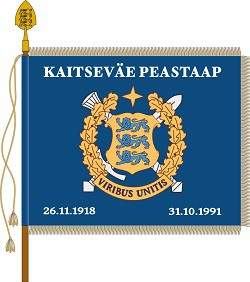
- Flag

The Headquarters of the Estonian Defence Forces is the working body of the Commander of the Estonian Defence Forces and joint staff of the Estonian Defence Forces. Its main tasks include supporting the activities of the Commander and Deputy Commander of the Defence Forces; planning the activities of the Defence Forces; advising, supervising, coordinating and controlling the activities of the Defence Forces units.

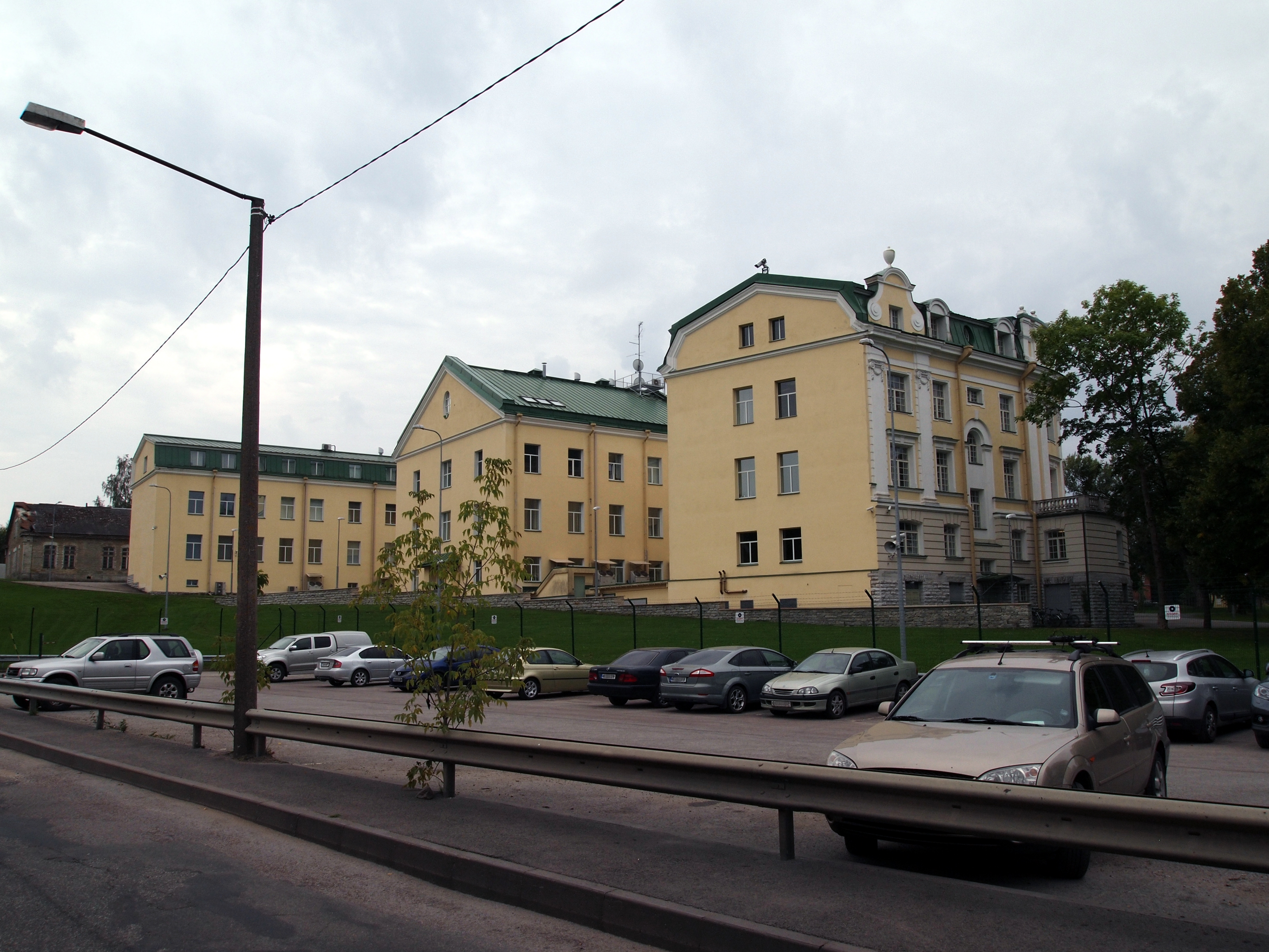
Estonian Defence Forces Headquarters building from the back

== History ==
The first headquarters of the Estonian military was initially formed on 6 December 1917, as the Staff of the Estonian Division. The formation of the headquarters was conducted by Andres Larka and Jaan Soots. The Staff of the Estonian Armies was officially established on 26 November 1918, with Andres Larka becoming the Chief of Staff. In 1926, the Staff of the Estonian Armies was abolished and its functions were transferred to the General Staff, which was subordinate to the Minister of War. In 1929, the General Staff and the Administrative Agency were joined into the Staff of the Defence Forces. On 1 April 1937, it was renamed the Staff of the Armies. The headquarters was abolished in 1940, after the Soviets occupied Estonia.

The headquarters was re-established on 31 October 1991, as the General Staff of the Defence Forces, with Ants Laaneots becoming the Chief of Staff. In 1995, based on the Navy and Air Force Departments of the General Staff, the Navy Staff and the Air Force Staff became independent units. In 2001, the Army Staff also became independent. In 2009, the General Staff was renamed the Headquarters of the Estonian Defence Forces.

== Structure ==
The Headquarters of the Estonian Defence Forces is mainly tasked with counseling and supporting the activities of the Commander of the Estonian Defence Forces, planning the activities of the Defence Forces, organizing the training of the Defence Forces, planning and coordinating military operations, and preparing and organizing mobilization. It is headed by the Chief of Staff of the Headquarters, who commands the staff and corresponding subordinate units. The headquarters consists of various departments: the General Department, Strategic Communication Department, Personnel Department (J1), Military Intelligence Centre (J2), Operations Department (J3), Logistics Department (J4), Analysis and Planning Department (J5), Signals Department (J6), Training Department (J7), and Budget and Finance Department (J8).

=== Chief of Staff ===
The Chief of Staff is responsible for providing information and analysis to the Commander of the Defence Forces, preparing and executing national defence, developing and managing command structures, administrating the Headquarters of the Defence Forces, managing of the Defence Forces resources and investments, planning military operations, organizing international cooperation and mobilization. The Chief of Staff is supported in his/her activities by the Deputy Chief of Staff, who can also stand in for the Chief of Staff in his/her absence.

List of Chiefs of Staff:

No.	Portrait	Chief of Staff	Took office	Left office	Time in office
1	Jaan Soots	Major General; Jaan Soots (1880–1942)	1917	1920	2–3 years
2	Jaan Rink [et]	Colonel; Jaan Rink (1886–1927)	28 March 1920	October 1920	0 years
3	Paul Lill	Major General; Paul Lill (1882–1942)	1920	1925	4–5 years
4	Juhan Tõrvand	Major General; Juhan Tõrvand (1883–1942)	1925	1934	8–9 years
5	Nikolai Reek	Major General; Nikolai Reek (1890–1942)	1937	1939	1–2 years
6	Aleksander Jaakson	Major General; Aleksander Jaakson (1892–1942)	1939	1940	0–1 years
Vacant; Soviet rule
7	Ants Laaneots	Major General; Ants Laaneots (born 1948)	1991	1999	7–8 years
8	Aarne Ermus	Lieutenant Colonel; Aarne Ermus (born 1966)	1999	2002	2–3 years
9	Alar Laneman	Brigadier General; Alar Laneman (born 1962)	2002	2006	3–4 years
10	Neeme Väli	Brigadier General; Neeme Väli (born 1965)	2007	2011	3–4 years
11	Riho Terras	Brigadier General; Riho Terras (born 1967)	March 2011	5 December 2011	0 years
12	Peeter Hoppe	Brigadier General; Peeter Hoppe (born 1960)	15 December 2011	8 July 2013	1 years
13	Igor Schvede	Commodore; Igor Schvede (born 1970)	8 July 2013	15 July 2016	3 years
14	Martin Herem	Major General; Martin Herem (born 1973)	15 July 2016	4 December 2018	2 years
15	Veiko-Vello Palm	Major General; Veiko-Vello Palm (born 1971)	5 December 2018	14 June 2021	2 years
16	Enno Mõts	Major General; Enno Mõts (born 1974)	19 June 2021	21 June 2024	3 years
17	Vahur Karus	Major General; Vahur Karus (born 1974)	21 June 2024	Incumbent	2 years

=== Departments ===
The General Department of the headquarters deals with administrative tasks. The Strategic Communication Department organizes public affairs, civil-military cooperation and information operations. The Personnel Department (J1) organizes human resources. The Operations Department (J3) is tasked with planning national defence, military operations, mobilization and readiness. The Logistics Department (J4) manages the economic activity of the Defence Forces. The Analysis and Planning Department (J5) deals with long-term planning and development of defence capabilities. The Signals Department (J6) is responsible for communication and information systems of the Defence Forces. The Training Department (J7) organizes training and exercises of the Defence Forces. The Budget and Finance Department (J8) is tasked with accounting and preparing the budget of the Defence Forces.

== Symbols and flags ==
The Headquarters of the Estonian Defence Forces received its flag on 29 October 2010. The flags blue field contains the emblem of the headquarters, with "KAITSEVÄE PEASTAAP" written in silver at the top, and two silver datums at the bottom - one marking the formation date and the other marking the restoration date of the headquarters. There is a small coat of arms of Estonia in the centre, which is supported by a crossed sword and staff in silver. The coat of arms is surrounded by a golden North Star, a wreath made of oak leaves, and a ribbon with the motto "VIRIBUS UNITIS". The crossed sword and staff symbolize the higher command level, the coat of arms and North Star symbolize the national level and international cooperation. The motto 'With United Forces' refers to the unity of the forces. The flag was designed by Margus Haavamägi.

=== Building of the Headquarters ===
The house was built in 1925 for a military hospital. The architect was Aleksander Vladovski. As many other Vladovski's buildings, the house at 58 Juhkentali Street is designed as Neo-Classicist, with some elements of late Jugend style. The planning solution involves three wings. In the Soviet time the building also housed a military hospital. In the 1990s the plot was transferred to the Defence Forces.
