= Andrus Merilo =

Estonian army officer (born 1973)

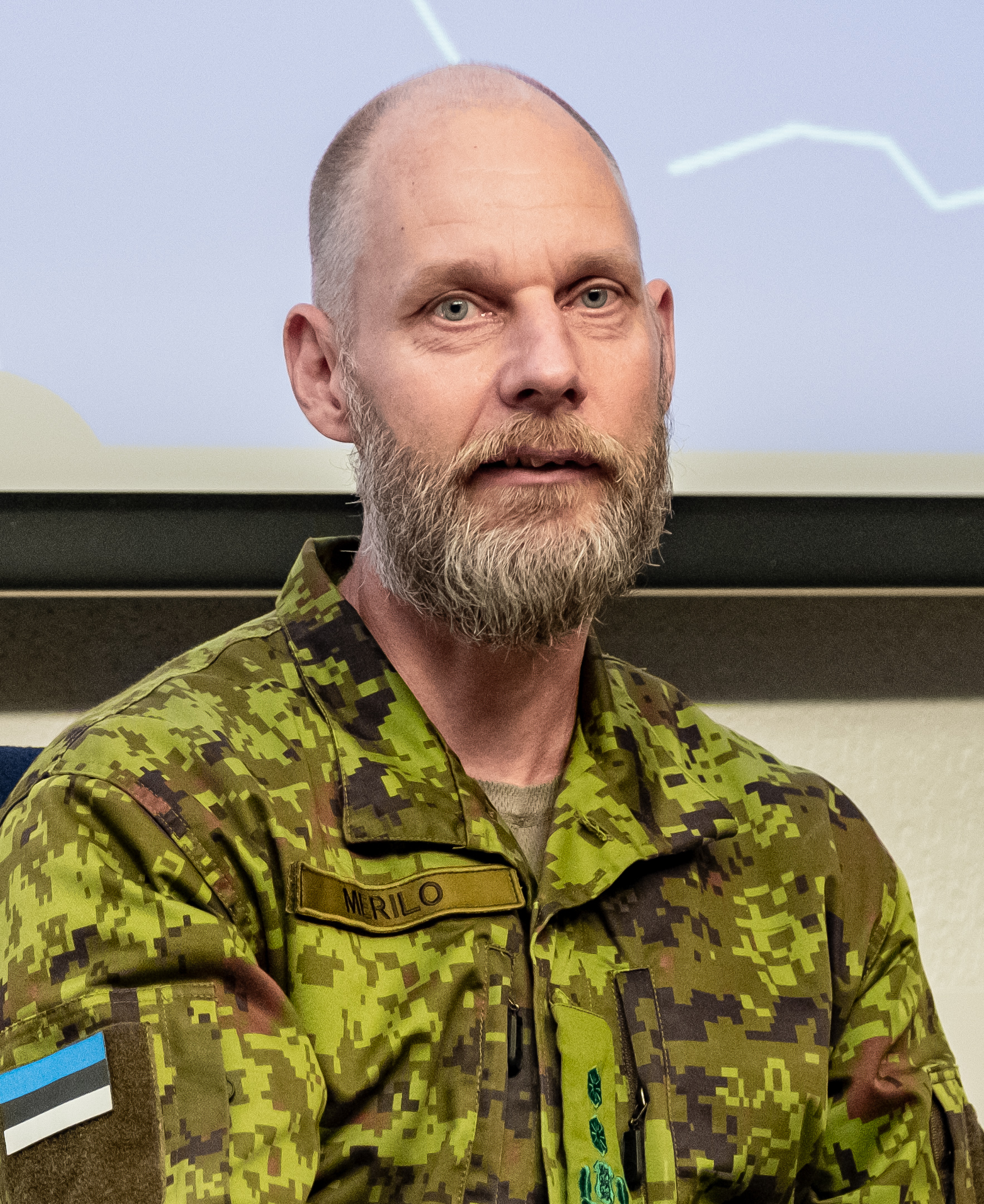

Commander of the Estonian Defence Forces
- Incumbent
- Assumed office 1 July 2024
- President: Alar Karis; Ülle Madise
- Preceded by: Martin Herem

Personal details
- Born: 2 June 1973 (age 53) Tallinn, then part of Estonian SSR, Soviet Union

Military service
- Allegiance: Estonia
- Branch/service: Estonian Land Forces
- Years of service: 1995–present
- Rank: Lieutenant General
- Commands: Scouts Battalion; 1st Infantry Brigade
- Battles/wars: UNIFIL; KFOR; Iraq War; War in Afghanistan
- Awards: See: Awards, decorations, and recognition

Andrus Merilo (born 2 June 1973) is an Estonian General and current Commander of the Estonian Defence Forces since 2024.

In 2005 he was the commander of ESTPLA-10 in Iraq. In 2007 he was the commander of ESTCOY-4 in Afghanistan.

Merilo commanded the Scouts Battalion from 2013 to 2016. Since June 2021, he commanded the 1st Infantry Brigade.

== Effective dates of promotion ==
Promotions
Insignia	Rank	Date
	Ensign	16 July 1999
	Sub-lieutenant	3 June 2002
	Lieutenant	12 June 2003
	Captain	3 October 2006
	Major	9 February 2010
	Lieutenant colonel	16 February 2015
	Colonel	18 February 2020
	Brigadier General	23 February 2024
	Major General	19 June 2024
	Lieutenant General	20 June 2025

== Awards, decorations and recognition ==
=== Decorations and badges ===

5th Class of the Order of the Cross of the Eagle (with swords)	Cross of Merit of the Ministry of Defence (III class)	Distinguished Service Decoration of the EDF (for battle merit)
Cross for the Exemplary Service of the Estonian Defence Forces	Gold Cross of the Officer of Land Forces	Silver Cross of the Officer of Land Forces
Estonian Defence Forces General Staff Cross of Merit	MoD Medal of Participants in International Military Operations	Estonian Defence Forces Long Service Medal
Merit Medal of the Defence League Special Class	Memorial Medal "10 Years of the Re-Established Defence Forces"	Distinguished Service Decoration of the Peace Operations Centre
National Defence Medal (gold grade) with bar	1st Class Commander of the White Rose of Finland	NATO Medal for ISAF
NATO Medal for KFOR	United Nations Interim Force in Lebanon Medal	National Service Medal (Army)

Badges
Badge of the Estonian Scouts Battalion
Badge of the Estonian 1st Infantry Brigade
The badge of the Finnish reserve officer course
United States Army Command and General Staff College International Graduate Badge

Military offices
Preceded by Martin Herem	Commander of the Estonian Defence Forces; 2024-present	Incumbent
