= Johannes Kert =

Estonian politician (1959–2021)

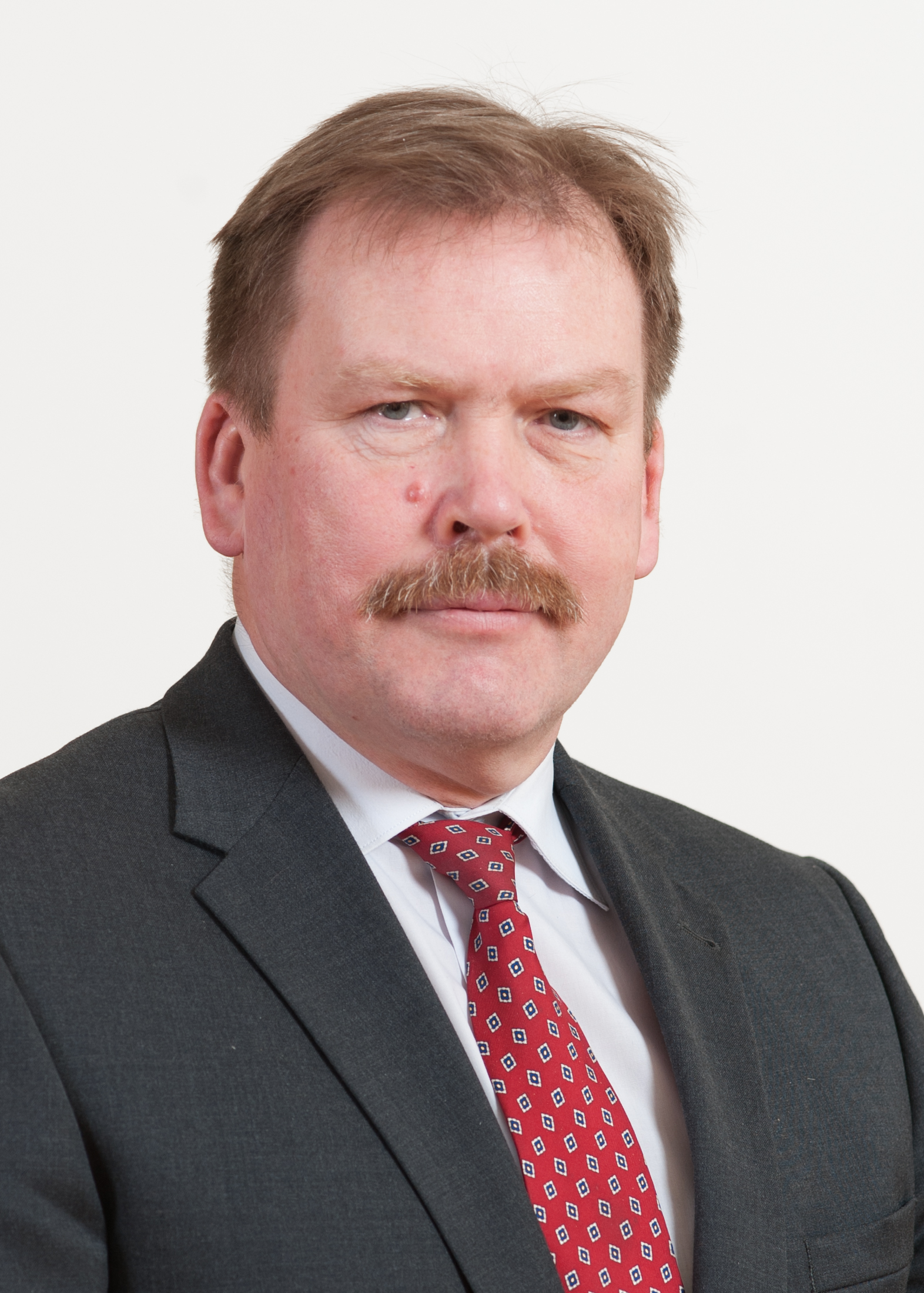
- Kert in 2015
- Born: 3 December 1959; Pechory, Russian SFSR, Soviet Union
- Died: 4 March 2021 (aged 61) Tallinn, Estonia
- Allegiance: Soviet Union (1981–1991); Estonia (1991–2008)
- Branch: Soviet Army; Estonian Land Forces
- Service years: 1981–2008
- Rank: Lieutenant General
- Commands: Estonian Land Forces (2001–2002); Estonian Defence Forces (1996–2000); Estonian Defence League (1993–1996); Kuperjanov Infantry Battalion (1992); Tartu Malev (1991)
- Awards: See: Awards, decorations, and recognition

Johannes Kert (3 December 1959 – 4 March 2021) was an Estonian politician and military officer. He served as the Commander of the Estonian Defence Forces from 1996 until 2000. He retired from the military in 2008. Since 2014, Kert had been a member of the Estonian Reform Party.

== Early life and education ==
Kert was born in 1959 in Pechory, in the Russian SFSR. He graduated from Friedrich Reinhold Kreutzwald Võru 1st Secondary School in 1978 and in 1981 from the Faculty of Physical Education of Tartu State University. He was conscripted as a lieutenant in the Soviet Army, where he was stationed in the Lithuanian SSR. Kert graduated from the Corps Commanders' Course at the Kharkiv Higher Tank School in 1988 and the Strategic Planning Course for Senior Civil Servants at the George C. Marshall Center for European Security Studies in Germany in 1994. He had studied at the Estonian National Defense Senior Command Special Course at the Finnish National Defense College in 1998–1999 and at the United States Army War College in Pennsylvania in 1999–2000.

== Military service ==
Johannes Kert served in the Soviet Army as a platoon commander and acting platoon commander from 1983 to 1985. He was a member of the Estonian Defence League since 1990. He was the Commander of the Tartu Division of the Defence League in 1991, Commander of the Operational Group of the Defence League from 1991 to 1992, Commander of the Kuperjanov Infantry Battalion in 1992. Kert was Commander of the Defence League from 1993 to 1996. He was Commander of the Defence Forces from 1996 to 2000, then Advisor to the Commander of the Defence Forces and Commander of the Land from 2000 to 2002. He was the Estonian Military Representative to NATO and the European Union from 2002 to 2008.

== Later life ==
He retired from active duty on January 31, 2008. Since 1 February 2008, he has been an advisor to the Ministry of Defence. He advised the Ministry mainly on cyber defence. He was one of the founders of the NGO Free Ukraine and an alumnus of the Korporatsioon Sakala. He has been a member of the Reform Party since October 2014. He ran in the 2015 Estonian parliamentary election in electoral district no. 8 and was elected with a district mandate (752 votes). He was a member of the Member of the 13th and 14th Riigikogu from March 30, 2015 to his death on 4 March 2021 in Tallinn. He was buried in the Defence Forces Cemetery of Tallinn.

In August 2023, a memorial to Kert was unveiled in Võru.

== Effective dates of promotion ==
=== Soviet Army ===
See Military ranks of the Soviet Union

Promotions
Insignia	Rank	Date
	Lieutenant (лейтена́нт)	1981
	Senior Lieutenant (ста́рший лейтена́нт)	1984
	Captain (капита́н)	1988

=== Estonian Land Forces ===
See Military ranks of Estonia

Promotions
Insignia	Rank	Date
	Captain	1992
	Major	21 June 1993
	Lieutenant Colonel	1 February 1995
	Colonel	23 January 1996
	Major General	4 June 1997
	Lieutenant General	19 June 1998

== Awards, decorations, and recognition ==
=== Decorations and badges ===
Estonian Awards and decorations
2nd Class of the Order of the Cross of the Eagle	2001
White Cross of the Estonian Defence League (I class)	2008
White Cross of the Estonian Defence League (II class)	
White Cross of the Estonian Defence League (III class)	
Cross of Merit of the Ministry of Defence (I class)	2009
Cross of Merit of the Ministry of Defence (II class)	2009
Distinguished Service Decoration of the EDF	20 February 2001
Order of Merit of the Estonian Defence Forces	18 May 2005
Merit Medal of the Defence League Special Class	
Gold Cross of the Officer of Land Forces	
Estonian Defence Forces General Staff Cross of Merit	12 November 2003
Merit Medal of the Defence League I Class	
Merit Medal of the Defence League II Class	
Memorial Medal "10 Years of the Re-Established Defence Forces"	
NCO School Medal of Merit	
Golden Cross of the Rescue Board	18 February 2002
Border Guard Cross of Merit I Class	
Memorial Medal 10 Years of the Re-Established Border Guard (I Class)	
Cross of the Estonian Reserve Officers’ Assembly (gold)	12 June 2001
Former Estonian Forest Brothers Association Service Cross II class)	
"City locked down" 20 year Memorial Medal	
Foreign Awards
Commander Grand Cross of the Order of the Lion of Finland	(Finland)
Golden Medal of Merit Finnish Reserve Officer Association	(Finland)
Order of Finnish Non-commissioned Officers League	(Finland)
Blue Cross	(Finland)
Cross of the Association of Military Guilds	(Finland)
Order of Merit of Latvian Ministry of Defense	(Latvia)
Award of the Minister of Defense badge of honor "For contribution to the development of the armed forces"	(Latvia)
Medal for Diligency in Military Service	(Latvia)
State of Maryland Distinguished Service Cross	(U.S.)
CISM Order of Merit Grand Knight	(International)
Baltic Assembly Medal	25 October 2018 (International)

Badges
Order of Merit of Kuperjanov Battalion
The Order of Merit of the Estonian National Defence College
The Order of Merit of the Estonian Reserve Officers’ Assembly
The Order of Merit of Estonian Border Guard "Sword and Lynx"
Order of Merit of Defense League unit in Jõgeva
Order of Merit of Defense League unit in Läänemaa
Order of Merit of Defense League unit in Tallinn
10 year service badge of Defense League unit in Tallinn
Order of Merit of Defense League unit in Tartu
Order of Merit of Defense League subunit in Tartu
Order of Merit of Defense League unit in Narva
The Board of Elders of the Estonian Defence League member badge

Military offices
Preceded by Manivald Kasepõld	Commander of the Estonian Defence League; 1992–1996	Succeeded by Neeme Väli
Preceded by Aleksander Einseln	Commander of the Estonian Defence Forces; 1996–2000	Succeeded by Tarmo Kõuts
