= Viljar Schiff =

Estonian military personnel (born 1974)

Viljar Schiff (born 1964) is an Estonian military personnel.

He has been the chief inspector of Estonian Defence Forces.

From 2001–2006, he was Commandant of the Estonian National Defence College.

In 1997, he was awarded with Order of the Cross of the Eagle, iron cross.
