= Igor Schvede =

Estonian military personnel (born 5 December 1970)

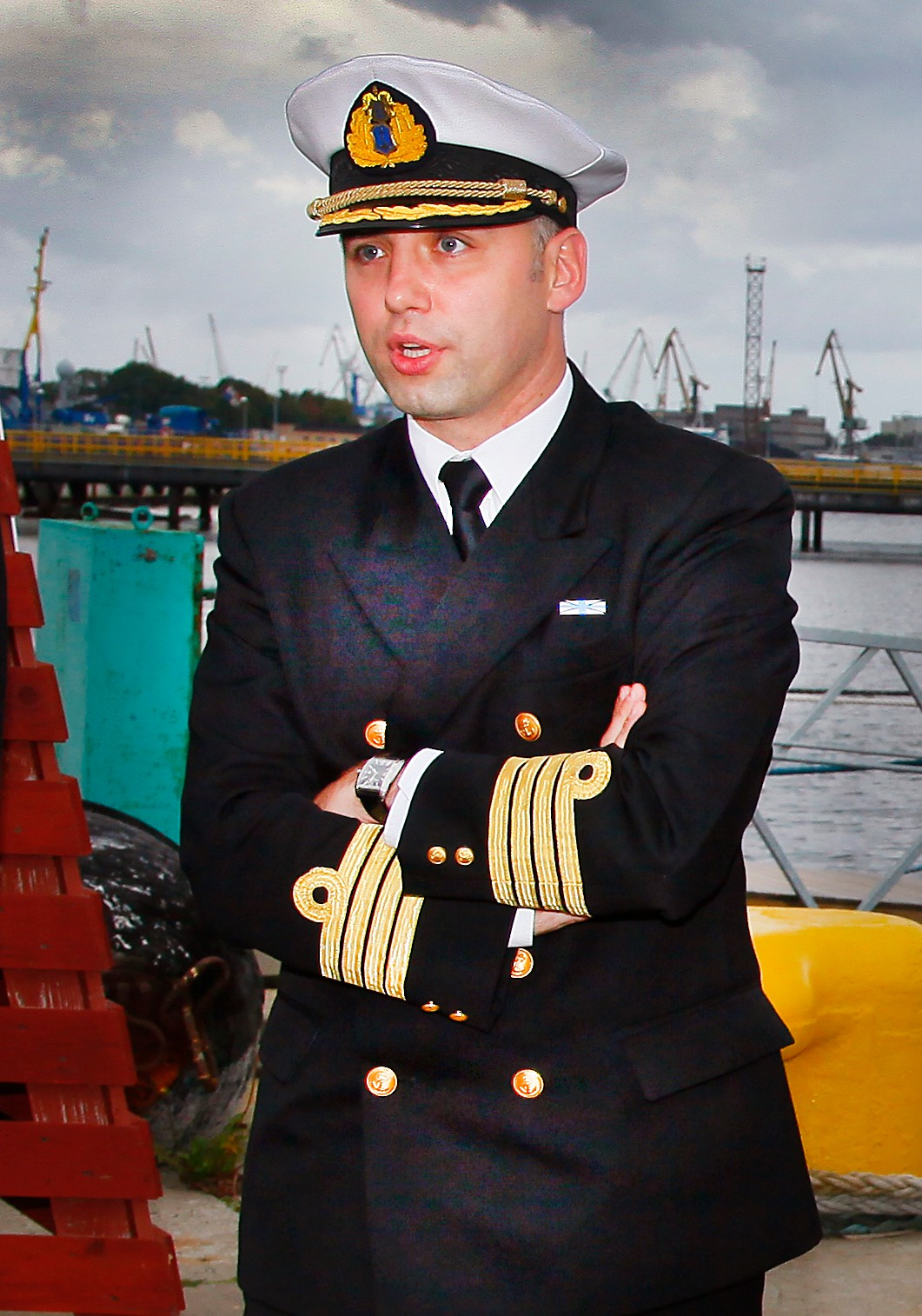

Commander of the Estonian Navy
- In office 9 August 2007 – 23 July 2012
- President: Toomas Hendrik Ilves
- Preceded by: Ahti Piirimägi
- Succeeded by: Sten Sepper

Personal details
- Born: 5 December 1970 (age 55) Prague, then Czechoslovak Socialist Republic

Military service
- Allegiance: Estonia
- Branch/service: Estonian Navy
- Years of service: 1993–2021
- Rank: Rear Admiral

Igor Schvede (born on 5 December 1970) is an Estonian Rear Admiral and the former Commander of the Estonian Navy from 2007 to 2012.

== Biography ==
Schvede was born in 1970 in Prague, the capital of the then-Czechoslovak Socialist Republic. His military career began at the Leningrad Nakhimov Naval School. He later joined the Soviet Navy in 1986, receiving education at the Frunze Naval Academy (now the St. Petersburg Naval Institute), where he graduated with a bachelors in Electromechanical Engineering. Schvede was commissioned in 1993 in the navy, the beginning of which he participated in the withdrawal of the Soviet Armed Forces from Estonia. He has commanded Estonian two patrol craft. In 2005, he was deployed to Afghanistan. In 2012, he graduated from US Naval Command College. From 2007 to 2012, he commanded Estonian Navy. From 2013 to 2016, Schvede was Chief of Staff at the Headquarters of the Estonian Defence Forces In August 2016, he was appointed as Estonia's representative to NATO and the European Union. Since 2021, he has been an advisor at the Ministry of Defence.

Schvede was given the rank of Rear Admiral in February 2020. He is a recipient of the Order of the Cross of the Eagle of the Defence League.

== Political activity ==
Igor Schvede has been a member of the Estonian Reform Party since 2022. He ran for the Riigikogu in the 2023 elections, he received 601 votes in electoral district no. 3 ( Tallinn Mustamäe and Nõmme districts) and was not elected.

== Dates of promotion ==
Promotions
| Insignia | Rank | Date |
|---|---|---|
| | Lieutenant | 1 February 1995 |
| | Senior lieutenant | 11 February 1997 |
| | Lieutenant commander | 18 February 2000 |
| | Commander | 19 February 2004 |
| | Captain | 18 February 2008 |
| | Commodore | 5 February 2015 |
| | Rear Admiral | 18 February 2020 |

== Recognition ==
- Navy Cross (1998)
- Estonian Defence Forces Medal of Merit (1998)
- 4th Class of the Order of the Cross of the Eagle (2005)
- Silver Badge of the Ministry of Defence (2000)
- Ministry of Defence Gold Badge (2004)
- Medal of Merit of the Estonian Defence Forces General Staff (2013)
- Memorial Medal "10 Years of the Re-Established Defence Forces" (2011)

== Personal life ==
He is fluent in Estonian, English and Russian.
