= Commander of the Estonian Defence Forces =

Chief of the Estonian Defence Forces

Commander of the Defence Forces
- Kaitseväe juhataja
- Standard of the Commander of the Defence Force

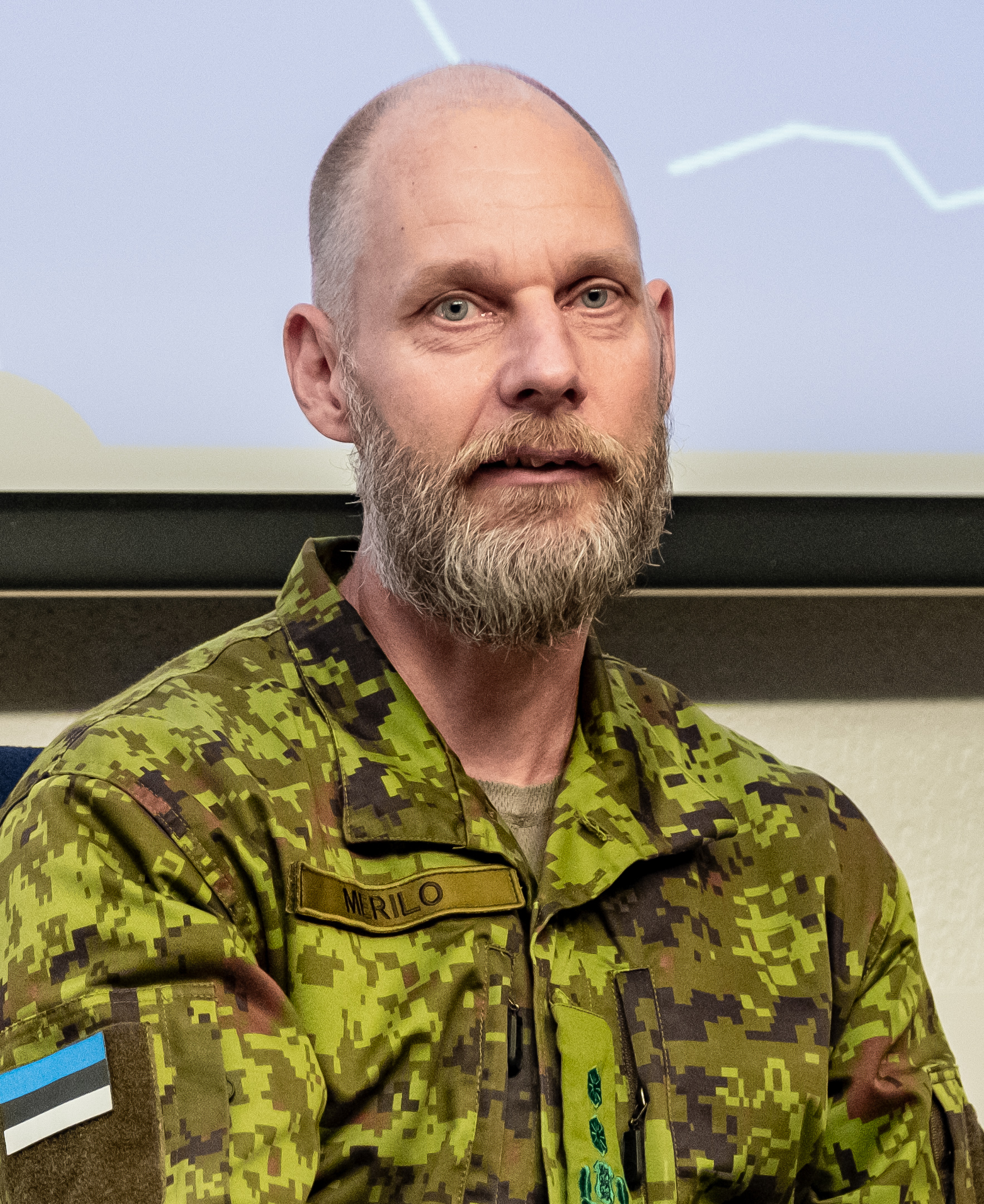
- Incumbent; Lieutenant General Andrus Merilo since 1 July 2024
- Estonian Defence Forces
- Type: Chief of defence
- Member of: Headquarters of the Estonian Defence Forces
- Reports to: Minister of Defence
- Seat: Tallinn, Estonia
- Nominator: Minister of Defence
- Appointer: Government of Estonia
- Term length: Five years (with option for another two years)
- Formation: 1918
- First holder: General Johan Laidoner
- Website: www.mil.ee

The Commander of the Defence Forces (Estonian: Kaitseväe juhataja) is the Chief of the Estonian Defence Forces and the national defence organisations.

== List of officeholders ==
No.	Portrait	Commander	Took office	Left office	Time in office	Defence branch	Ref.
1	Johan Laidoner	General; Johan Laidoner (1884–1953) (Note: First term served during Estonian War of Independence. Made commander-in-chief twice under martial law. Eventually removed from position on 22 June 1940, after Soviet Union occupied Estonia.)	23 December 1918 1 December 1924 12 March 1934	26 March 1920 8 January 1925 22 June 1940	1 year, 94 days 38 days 6 years, 102 days Total: 7 years, 234 days	Army	
2	Gustav Jonson	Major General; Gustav Jonson (1880–1942) (Note: Served as commander-in-chief following the forced resignation of Johan Laidoner following the Soviet Union's demand that the Red Army establish military bases and station 25,000 troops on Estonian soil for the duration of the war. Executed by Soviet authorities in 1942.)	22 June 1940	3 September 1940	73 days	Army; Cavalry	
Vacant; Soviet and German occupations
3	Jaan Maide	Major General; Jaan Maide (1896–1945) (Note: Served as commander-in-chief in the period between the German occupation and second Soviet occupation. Captured by the Soviets on 24 October 1944.)	18 September 1944	24 October 1944	36 days	Army	
Vacant; Soviet occupation
4	Aleksander Einseln	General; Aleksander Einseln (1931–2017) (Note: Resigned on 4 December 1995 due to a disagreement with the Minister of Defence.)	1 May 1993	4 December 1995	2 years, 217 days	Army	
5	Johannes Kert	Lieutenant General; Johannes Kert (1959–2021) (Note: Was requested to make a resignation by the head of state, head of government and the Minister of Defence, but refused. Impeached by the President of the Republic on 30 June 2000.)	23 January 1996	30 June 2000	4 years, 159 days	Defence League	
–	Aarne Ermus	Lieutenant colonel Aarne Ermus (born 1966); Acting	30 June 2000	21 September 2000	83 days	Army	
6	Tarmo Kõuts	Vice Admiral; Tarmo Kõuts (born 1953) (Note: Requested to be resigned to enter politics.)	21 September 2000	14 November 2006	6 years, 54 days	Border Guard	
7	Ants Laaneots	General; Ants Laaneots (born 1948)	5 December 2006	5 December 2011	5 years, 0 days	Army	
8	Riho Terras	General; Riho Terras (born 1967)	5 December 2011	5 December 2018	7 years, 0 days	Army	
9	Martin Herem	General; Martin Herem (born 1973)	5 December 2018	30 June 2024	5 years, 208 days	Army	
10	Andrus Merilo	Lieutenant General; Andrus Merilo (born 1973)	1 July 2024	Incumbent	2 years, 129 days	Army	

== See also ==
- Kindral
