= Ain Tiidrus =

Estonian military personnel (born 1977)

Ain Tiidrus (born in 1977) is an Estonian officer (Lieutenant Colonel). He is the former commander of Kalev Infantry Battalion.

In 2010, he was awarded with Order of the Cross of the Eagle, IV class.
