= Ants Kiviselg =

Estonian sport physician, rower and military personnel

Ants Kiviselg (born 13 July 1955 in Pärnu) is an Estonian sports physician and military officer.

In 1979 he graduated from Tartu State University in medicine.

From 1990 to 1996 he was the head physician and the head of the Dünamix sports medicine centre. From 1984 to 2001 he was a physician for the Estonian rowing team.

Since 1993 he has also been active in the Estonian Defence Forces. From 2000 to 2001, he was commandant of the Estonian National Defence College.

== Awards ==
- 2006: Order of the Cross of the Eagle, III class.
