= Enno Mõts =

Estonian military personnel (born 1974)

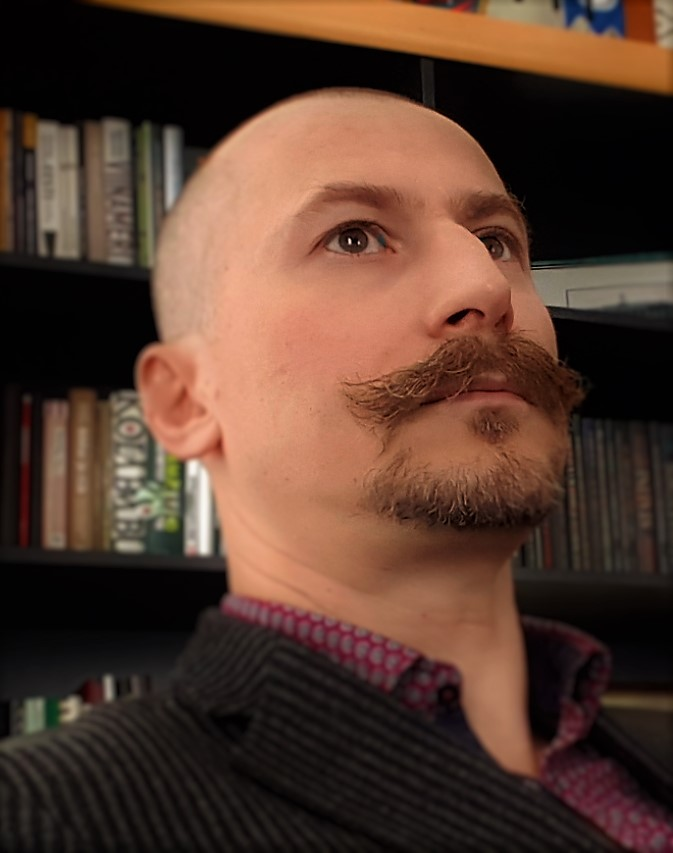
Enno Mõts

Enno Mõts (born 14 October 1974 in Tartu) is an Estonian Major General and the former Chief of Staff of the Headquarters of the Estonian Defence Forces.

== Biography ==
He was born on 14 October 1974 in Tartu. He graduated from the Pühajärvi Primary School in 1989 and Puka Middle School in 1992. He graduated in 1996 from the Estonian National Defense Academy. After serving in leadership positions in the Estonian Land Forces, in 2011, he graduated the University of Tartu. The next year, he became Commander of the Northeast Defense District, and in 2014, headed the Southern Defense District. In 2016, he became the head of Estonian Military Academy. He was Chief of Staff of the Headquarters of the Estonian Defence Forces in 2021-2024.

== Awards ==
- Defense Forces Long Service Medal (2018)
- Order of the Cross of the Eagle, III class (2019)
- Medal of Merit of the Baltic Defense College (2019)
