= Sten Sepper =

Estonian military personnel

Sten Sepper (born 17 February 1971) is an Estonian military personnel.

From 2004 to 2005 he was the leader of BALTRON.

From 2012 to 2016 he was the commander of the Estonian Navy.
