= Order of the White Star =

Estonian state decoration

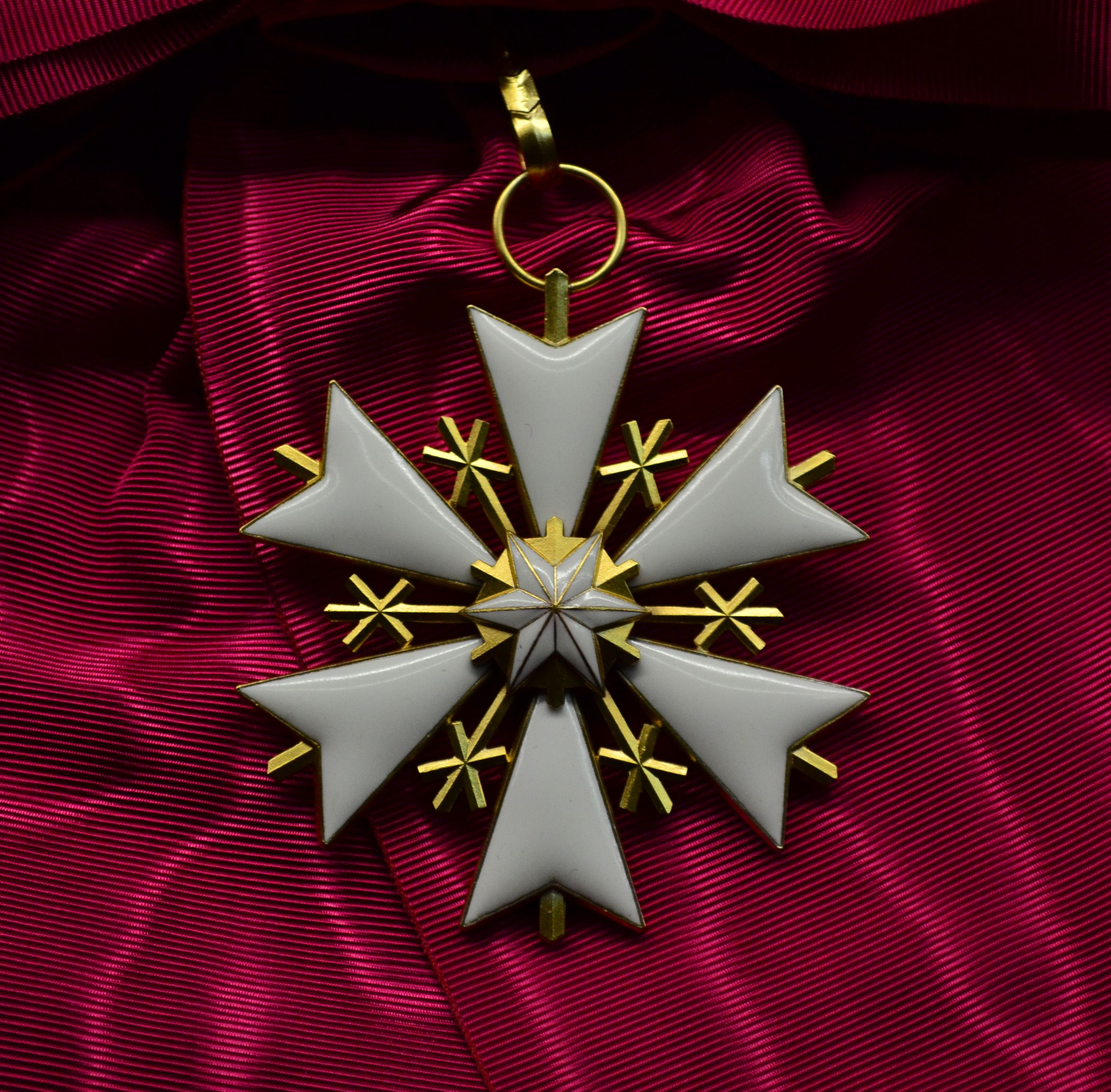
- Badge of the 1st Class
- Type: Order and medal
- Awarded for: Services rendered in state, public service, or local government
- Presented by: Estonia
- Status: Currently awarded
- Established: 1936
- 1st Class 2nd Class 3rd Class 4th Class 5th Class Ribbon bars of the Order of the White Star

Precedence
- Next (higher): Order of the Cross of Terra Mariana
- Next (lower): Order of the Cross of the Eagle

The Order of the White Star (Estonian: Valgetähe teenetemärk; French: Ordre de l'Etoile blanche) was instituted in 1936. The Order of the White Star is bestowed on Estonian citizens and foreigners to give recognition for services rendered to the Estonian state. The order was reinstituted in 1996, after the end of the Soviet occupation of Estonia.

== Design ==
=== Classes ===
The Order of the White Star comprises one special collar class, five basic classes, and one medal:

- Special class: Collar of the Order. It is a golden necklet that has smaller Stars in its design all around it.
- The five main classes:
  - First Class – It has two different types, the male version and the female version. The male version of the Order of the White Star has wider ribbons than the female class.
  - Second Class – It has two different types, the male version and the female version. The male version of the Order of the White Star is worn around the neck, female recipients wear the insignia mounted on a bow on the left chest.
  - Third Class – It has two different types, the male version and the female version. The male version of the Order of the White Star has a full neck ribbon, while a "bow and tails" ribbon is worn in the female version. The Third Class doesn't come with the Star of the Order, just the ribbon and the attached Order Badge.
  - Fourth Class – It has just one type but the single ribbon has a rosette on it.
  - Fifth Class – It has just one type but the single ribbon does not have a rosette on it.
- The Order has a single Medal Class. The medal class has the same design as the fifth main class, but the badge itself is backed in a circular section of silver.

=== Ribbons ===
The ribbon is red coloured, and is attached to all classes, and the medal of the Order of the White Star. The first, second, and third classes have a double ribbon design, the first has a crossed design, the second and third classes have the ribbons meeting at the ends to attach to the Order's Star. The fourth, fifth, and the medal classes have a single red ribbon design.

== See also ==
- Category:Recipients of the Order of the White Star
