= Aarne Ermus =

Estonian military personnel

- Born: April 14, 1966 (age 60); Abja-Paluoja, then part of Estonian SSR, Soviet Union
- Military career
- Allegiance: Estonia
- Branch: Estonian Defence Forces
- Service years: 1991 – present
- Rank: Colonel
- Commands: Headquarters of the Estonian Defence Forces; Estonian Military Academy

Aarne Ermus (born 14 April 1966) is an Estonian military officer.

== Biography ==
=== Early life and service in the Soviet Army ===
Aarne Ermus was born on 14 April 1966 in Abja-Paluoja. He graduated Karksi-Nuia Middle School in 1984 and continued his studies in Omsk at the Higher Command Military School. After graduating from the Omsk Military School, Aarne Ermus was first the commander of a motorized rifle group of the Soviet Army in the Far East.

=== Estonian Defence Force ===
In connection with the restoration of independence of Estonia, Ermus joined the EDF. From 1992 to 1996, he was associated with the Kuperjanov Infantry Battalion.

He has been Chief of Staff of the General Staff of the Estonian Defence Forces, also as the Operative Commander of the Estonian Defence Forces. He has been Estonia's permanent military representative at NATO headquarters with the Allied Powers Europe. He has also been Defence Attaché to Latvia and Lithuania. In 2007 he became the Commander of the Estonian National Defence College, and in 2013 he became a lecturer.
