= Peeter Hoppe =

Estonian brigadier general

Peeter Hoppe (born on 1960) is an Estonian military officer, since 2013 Brigadier General. From 2011 to 2013 he was Chief of Estonian Defence Forces.

He has graduated from Tallinn Polytechnical Institute.
