= General (Estonia) =

Highest rank of Estonian Land Force and Air Force

General Kindral
- Land Force and Air Force insignia
- Country: Estonia
- Service branch: Estonian Land Forces; Estonian Air Force
- Rank group: General officer
- Rank: Four-star
- NATO rank code: OF-9
- Next lower rank: Kindralleitnant
- Equivalent ranks: Admiral

Kindral is the Estonian word for General which is also the highest military position in the Republic of Estonia. Both Ground Force and Air Force superior officers ranks share the same names which have been combined with the military rank of general and other senior officer ranks. There are four types of generals in the Estonia Defence Forces.

== Estonian superior officers ==
Kindral (General)

Kindralleitnant (Lieutenant General)

Kindralmajor (Major General)

Brigaadikindral (Brigadier/Brigadier General)

== Notable Generals ==
- 1939: Johan Laidoner (1884–1953)
- 1995: Aleksander Einseln (1931–2017)
- 2011: Ants Laaneots (born 1948)
- 2017: Riho Terras (born 1967)
- 2023: Martin Herem (born 1973)

== See also ==
- Military of Estonia
