= Neeme Väli =

Estonian military personnel

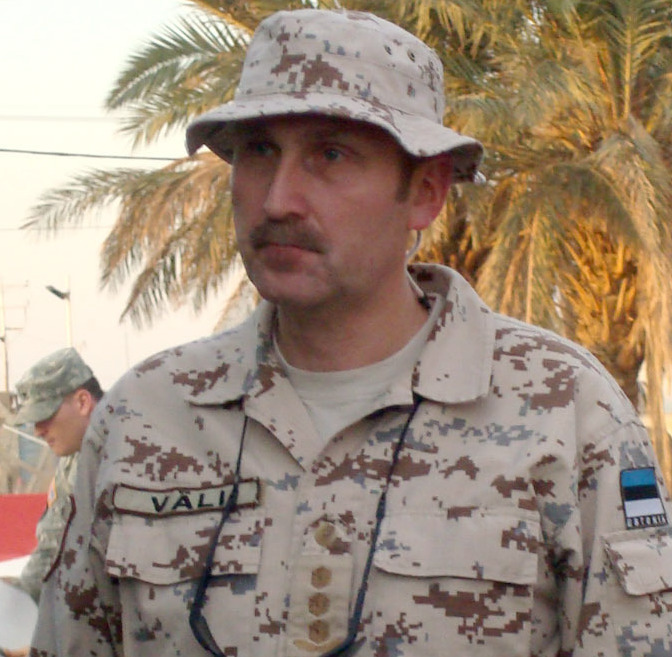
Väli visiting soldiers in Iraq

Neeme Väli (born 1 June 1965, in Paide) is an Estonian Major General of the Estonian Defence League.

He was one of re-establishers of Estonian Defence League in 1990.

In 1996 he become Chief of Staff of the Headquarters of the Estonian Defence League. At the same time, he was also Acting Commander of the Estonian Defence League.

In March 2011, he was appointed as Estonian Military Representative to NATO and European Union.
