= Estonian Military Academy =

Institute for national defense in Estonian

Coordinates: 58°22′24.64″N 26°43′20.75″E

- Kaitseväe Akadeemia
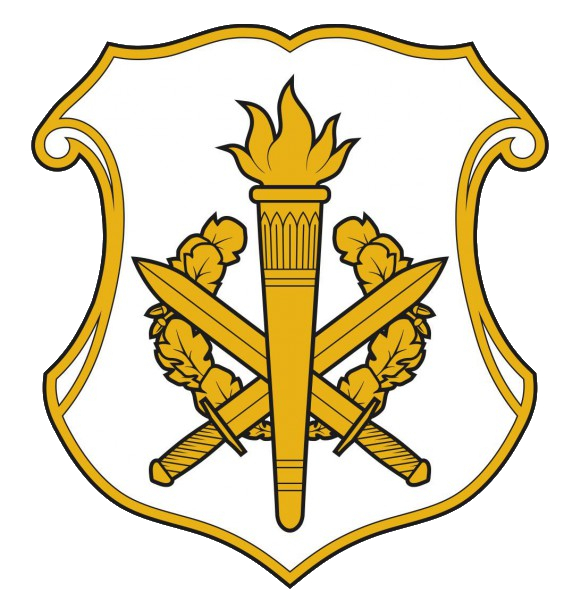
- Former name: Estonian National Defence College
- Motto: Mente et ense pro patria
- Type: Military Academy
- Established: April 3, 1919; 107 years ago
- Parent institution: Estonian Defence Forces
- Commandant: Commodore Johan-Elias Seljamaa
- Location: Riia 12, 51010 Tartu, Estonia
- Colours: Black and gold
- Website: kvak.ee/en/

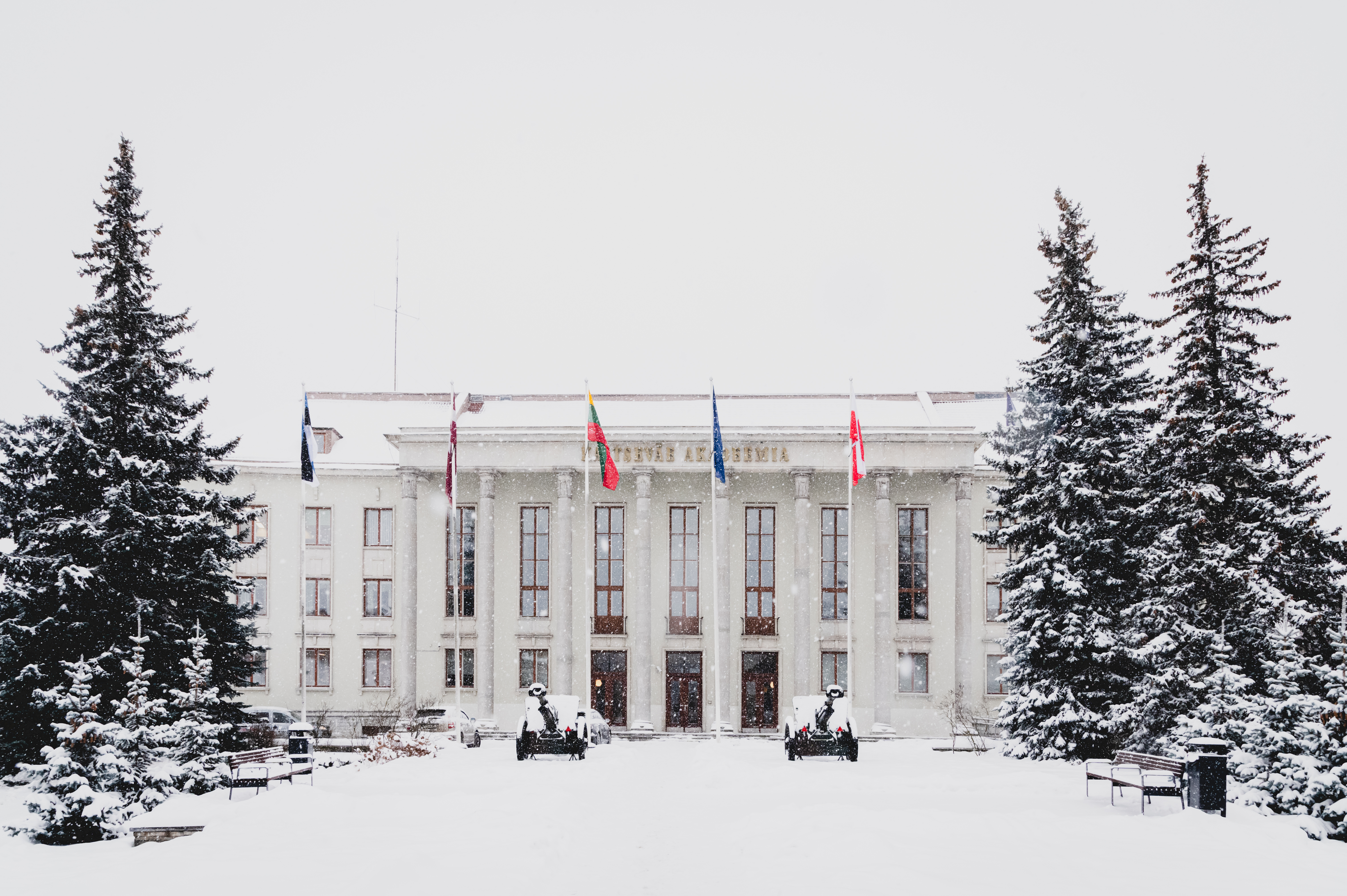
Estonian Military Academy building

The Estonian Military Academy (Estonian: Kaitseväe Akadeemia) is an institution of applied higher education for national defence in Tartu, Estonia.

The institution's mission is to train and educate regular officers for the Estonian Defence Forces and Estonian Defence League, as well as other military institutions.

The academic program of EMA provides a balanced education in military and civilian subjects. The academic staff members of the EMA are supported by members of the academic community from universities throughout Estonia.

== History ==
=== 1919–1940 ===
The school was established on April 3, 1919, by the decree of the commander-in-chief of the Estonian Defence Forces, General Major Johan Laidoner. During the Estonian War of Independence, preparation of non-commissioned officers was limited because men and resources were needed on the front line. However, after the war, there was a growing need for officers, who could train and teach soldiers. Thus a school for non-commissioned officers was formed. Cadets were taught tactics, topography, administration, fortification, machine-gun employment, military law, health care, Estonian, artillery science and gymnastics. The first courses lasted 4 months. After completion of the course, cadets were promoted to the rank of ensign.

Infantry school was founded on May 20, 1920. In 1921, studies were lengthened to three years and divided into three classes: general class, I special class, and II special class. Young men with six-grade education were admitted to the general class, where they were taught gymnasium subjects alongside military subjects. Men with secondary education were admitted to the I special class, and II special class was for reserve officers. During that same year, infantry-, artillery- and cavalry schools were merged into the non-commissioned officer school.

On 29 August 1923, all military schools were merged into the academy, which consisted of the Military School, Higher Military School and the School of Non-Commissioned Officers. In 1927, prior military service became a prerequisite for entering the military school.

In 1928, training of conscript NCO's ended in the School for Non-Commissioned Officers. The school itself was moved from Juhkentali to Tondi. Officer training also changed, with a class for aspirants, and classes for junior cadets and senior cadets. Aspirant class was for reserve officers and cadet classes were for regular officers. Training of officers changed again in 1935, when all officers began to be trained in aspirant and officer classes. Graduates of the aspirant class received reserve officer training, while in the officer classes, postgraduates of the aspirant class received additional training to become regular officers. In 1936, the School for Non-Commissioned Officers was dissolved and a new school was formed in its place.

In 1940, after the Soviets had annexed Estonia, the academy was reorganized into an infantry school for the Red Army.

=== 1998 - present ===
The Estonian National Defence College was restored on March 17, 1998. Before that, officers received training in the Defence College of the Estonian Academy of Security Sciences. Since 1998, there were two curriculums - one provided vocational higher education for officers who would mainly become platoon commanders, the other provided diploma studies for future company and battalion commanders. Studies took three and a half years and gave the students basic knowledge of history, politology, social-, behavioral-, and humanitarian sciences, natural- and exact sciences, and native and foreign languages.

The academy operated on the premises of Estonian Academy of Security Sciences until 1999, when it moved to Tartu. Between 2001 and 2002, Finland helped organize courses for logistics, engineering, artillery and communication specialties. Finland also helped in organizing logistics, artillery, and air-defence courses between 2003 and 2004.

In 2004, the institution adapted its curriculum in line with the Bologna declaration. In 2005, it became a vocational university, which could also issue a master's degree. The university received its first accreditation from an international commission in 2006. In 2008, the academy opened its curriculum for air force officers, and in 2011, for navy officers. Between 2010 and 2013, the academy offered a course for junior officers. In 2010, the university also started offering external studies for officers who would not be able to partake in regular studies.

The Estonian National Defence College received its flag in 2013, from the Estonian Reserve Officers’ Association. In 2019, the university went through a restructuring and was renamed the Estonian Military Academy. To reflect that change, in February 2020, it received a new flag from the Estonian Reserve Officers’ Association, cadet council of the City of Tartu and the Defence Forces.

== Officer training ==
- Basic Officer Training Course is the first level programme with a three-year study period carried out in the Estonian National Defense College. In the course, the cadets acquire the skills of a platoon leader and company commander. On completion of the course, the cadets will have applied higher education and the rank of a second lieutenant.
- Advanced Officer Training Course is the second level of officer training with a two-year study period, whereby the students acquire the knowledge and skills necessary to perform the duties of junior staff officers of an infantry battalion or brigade.
- Senior Staff Officer Course — the third level of officer training — is a one-year course conducted in cooperation with the Baltic Defence College in the same building with the ENDC (or relevant training in some educational institution abroad).
- Higher Staff Officer Course, the fourth level of officer training, is conducted in higher staff officer courses and general staff officer courses in educational institutions abroad.

The Estonian National Defence College offers the first level and, since the 2005/2006 study year, the second level of military higher education.

== See also ==
- Baltic Defence College
- Estonian Academy of Security Sciences
- List of universities in Estonia
