= Order of the Cross of the Eagle =

Estonian state award

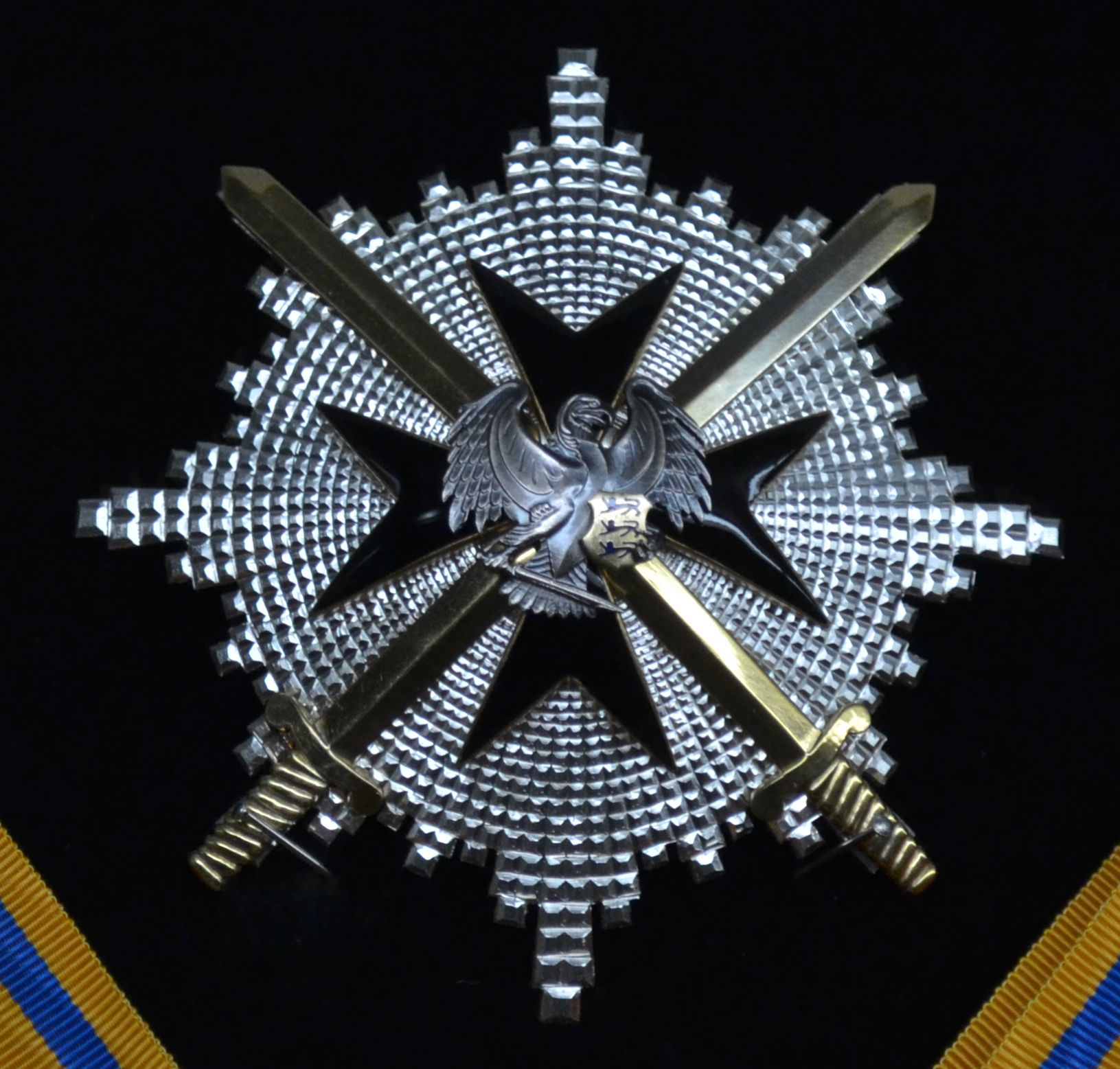
- Star of the 1st Class of the order
- Type: Order granted in 5 classes with three affiliated crosses, in both civil and military divisions.
- Awarded for: Military services and services in the field of national defence
- Presented by: Estonia
- Eligibility: Civilians and military personnel
- Established: 17 February 1928; 13 September 1936 as a state order
- 1st Class 2nd Class 3rd Class 4th Class 5th Class Gold Cross Silver Cross Iron Cross Ribbon bars of the Order of the Cross of the Eagle

Precedence
- Next (higher): Order of the White Star
- Equivalent: Order of the Estonian Red Cross

The Order of the Cross of the Eagle (Estonian: Kotkaristi teenetemärk) was instituted in 1928 by the Estonian Defence League to commemorate the tenth anniversary of Estonian independence. It was adopted as a state order in 1936. The Order of the Cross of the Eagle is bestowed to give recognition for military services and services in the field of national defence. It is awarded in civil and military divisions. The awards made to members of the military are denoted by the addition of crossed swords to the decoration.

== Classes ==
The Order of the Cross of the Eagle comprises eight classes:

- Five basic classes - 1st, 2nd, 3rd, 4th and 5th class;
- Three medal classes - crosses in gold, silver and iron;

The crosses of all the classes of the Order of the Cross of the Eagle have the same design.

The colour tone of the orange moiré ribands belonging to the decorations of all the classes of the Order of the Cross of the Eagle is determined according to the international PANTONE colour-table as 137 MC.

The Order of the Cross of the Eagle is a military decoration if two crossed swords are affixed to it as follows:

- The cross has crossed swords movably attached at the hilts of the swords to the tips of the top arms of the cross. The length of the swords together with their hilts is 35 mm for the 1st, 2nd and 3rd class decorations and 33 mm for the 4th and 5th class decorations and the gold, silver and iron crosses;
- The star has crossed swords affixed to the oblique rays of the star and the vertical and horizontal rays remain uncovered. The swords are set hilts down. The length of each sword is 85 mm.

The medals of the affiliated crosses of the Order of the Cross of the Eagle have swords in the same metal as their cross.

== Gallery ==
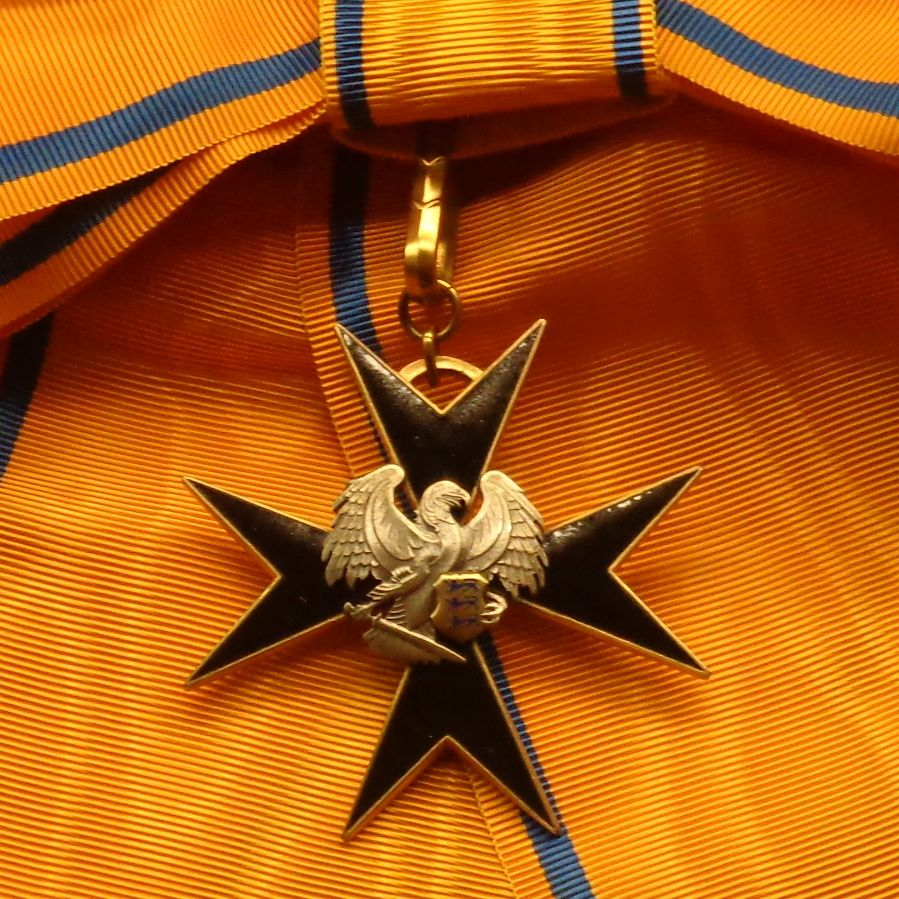
1st Class of the Order of the Cross of the Eagle

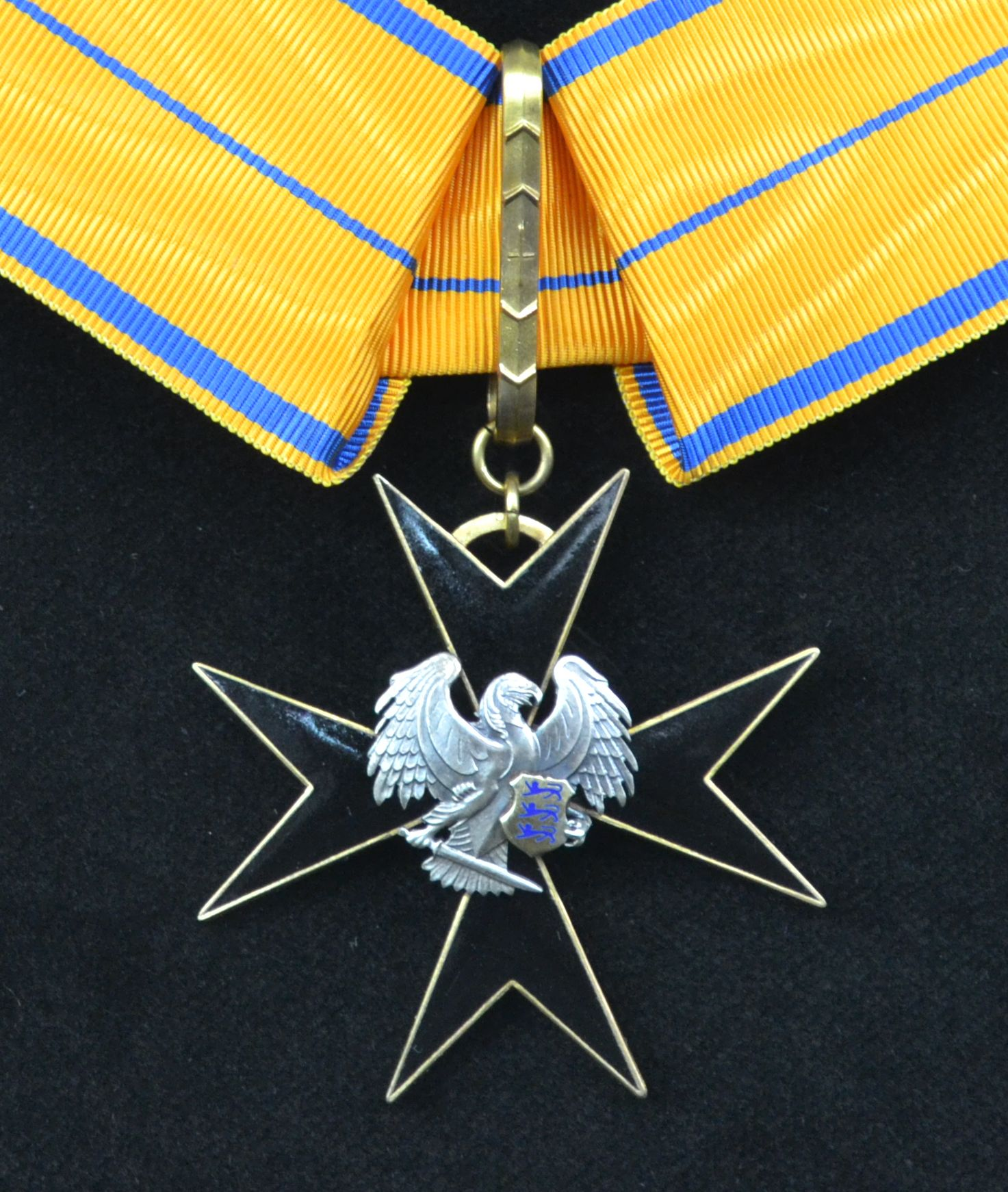
2nd Class of the Order of the Cross of the Eagle

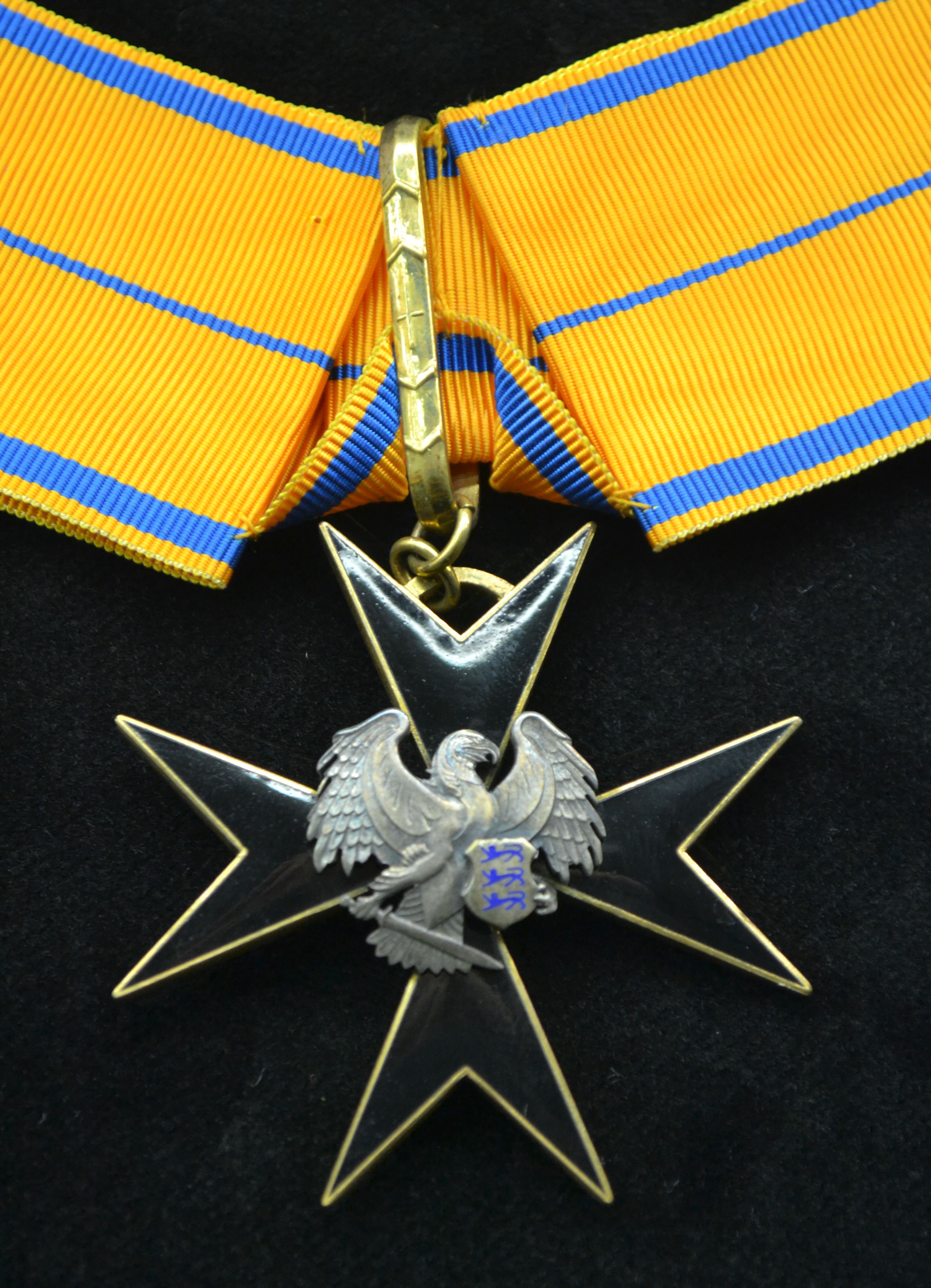
3rd Class of the Order of the Cross of the Eagle

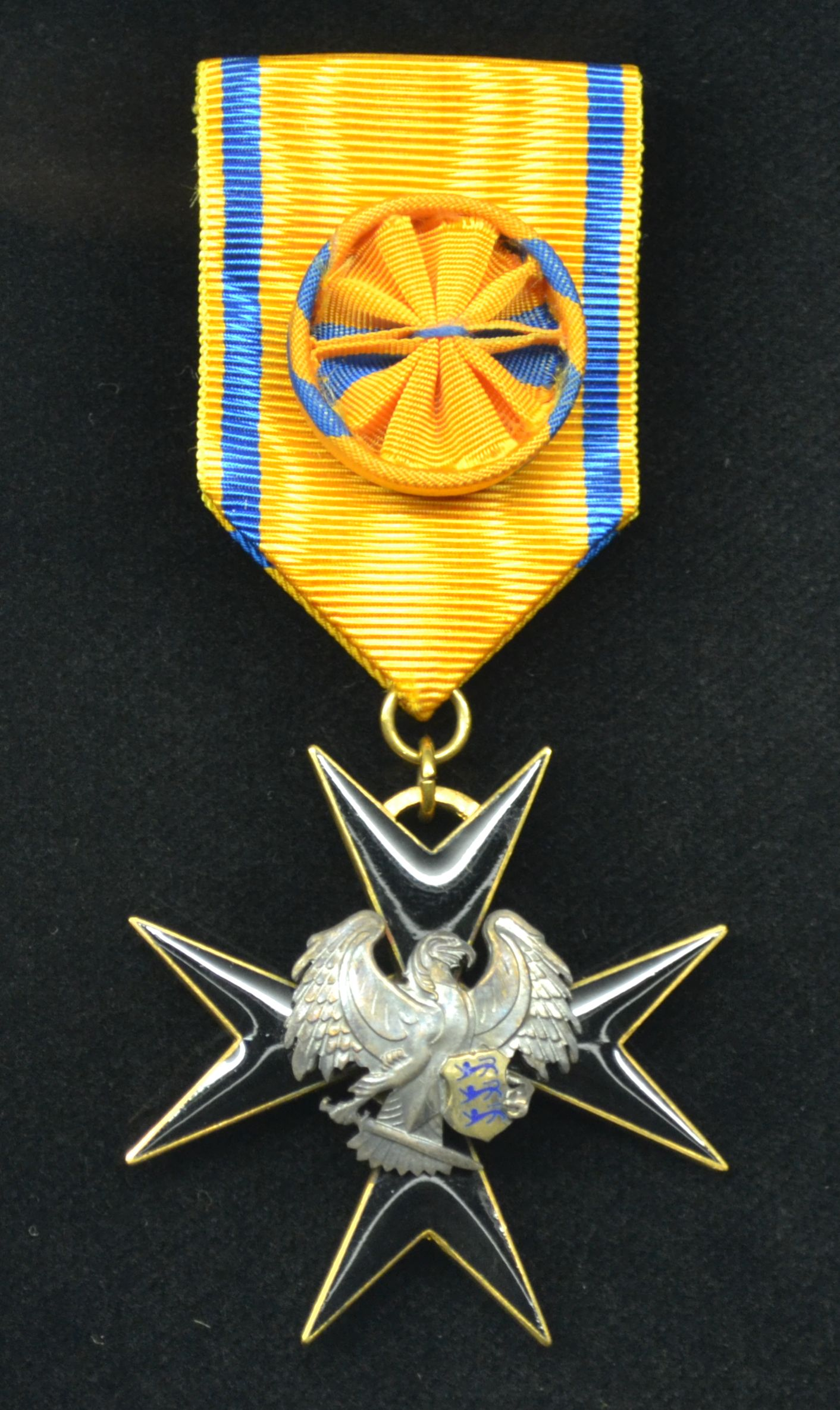
4th Class of the Order of the Cross of the Eagle

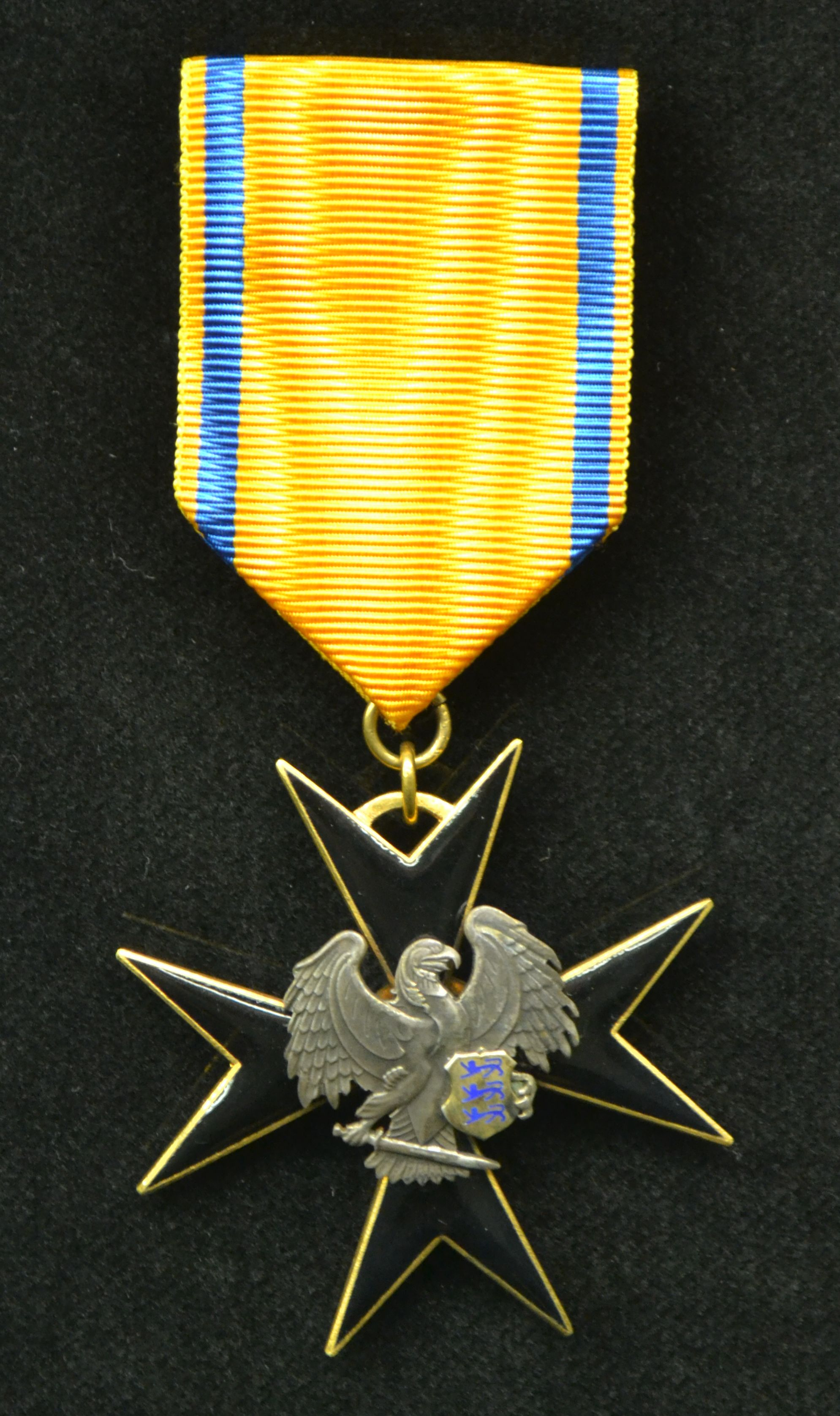
5th Class of the Order of the Cross of the Eagle
