= List of Estonian commanders =

This is a list of the current Estonian commanders:

== Superior officers ==
Generals and Admirals

- Martin Herem

Major Generals and Rear Admirals

- Indrek Sirel
- Enno Mõts
- Ilmar Tamm

Brigadier-Generals and Commodores

- Artur Tiganik
- Vahur Karus
- Andrus Merilo
- Jüri Saska (Merevägi)
- Rauno Sirk (Õhuvägi)
- Toomas Susi (Õhuvägi)

== Senior officers ==
Colonels and (Naval) Captains

- Jüri Järveläinen
- Aarne Ermus
- Albert Helme
- Aivar Jaeski
- Viljar Schiff
- Artur Suzik
- Aivar Salekešin
- Kajari Klettenberg
- Eduard Kikas
- Peeter Läns
- Aivar Kokka
- Vahur Väljamäe
- Mirko Arroküll
- Aron Kalmus
- Risto Lumi
- Jaak Mee
- Vahur Murulaid
- Urmas Nigul
- Eero Rebo
- Kaupo Rosin
- Andres Hairk
- Kalev Koidumäe
- Margus Koplimägi
- Vitali Lokk
- Leon Meier
- Ain Rekkand
- Mati Tikerpuu
- Tarmo Metsa
- Mart Vendla
- Taivo Rõkk
- Meelis Sarapuu
- Viktor Kalnitski
- Mait Müürisepp
- Märt Plakk
- Margo Grosberg
- Margus Kuul
- Janno Märk
- Indrek Lilleorg
- Tarmo Kundla
- Roman Lukas (Merevägi)
- Indrek Hanson (Merevägi)
- Ivo Värk (Merevägi)
- Johan Elias Seljamaa (Merevägi)
- Arvo Palumäe (Õhuvägi)
- Riivo Valge (Õhuvägi)
- Janek Lehiste (Õhuvägi)

== See also ==
- Military of Estonia
- List of former Estonian commanders
