= Scouting and Guiding in Estonia =

The Scout and Guide movement in Estonia is served by

- Eesti Gaidide Liit, member of the World Association of Girl Guides and Girl Scouts
- Eesti Skautide Ühing, member of the World Organization of the Scout Movement

In addition, there are youth branches Young Eagles for boys and Home Daughters for girls of the Estonian Defence League which sometimes employ the Scout method.

== History ==
Scouting in Estonia dates back to 1912, when a group of boys gathered in Pärnu.

Since 1922, Estonia was a member of the international scouting organization. After Soviet occupation, scouting movement was banned in Estonia.
