= Vahur =

Male given name and family name

Vahur is a masculine Estonian given name and may refer to:

- Vahur Afanasjev (1979–2021), Estonian writer, filmmaker and musician
- Vahur Glaase (born 1960), Estonian politician
- Vahur Kersna (born 1962), Estonian journalist, radio and television personality and caricaturist
- Vahur Kraft (born 1961), Estonian banker
- Vahur Murulaid (born 1967), Estonian military lieutenant colonel
- Vahur Sova (born 1956), Estonian architect
- Vahur Vahtramäe (born 1976), Estonian footballer
- Vahur Väljamäe (born 1968), Estonian military soldier

As a surname:

- Britta Vahur (born 1984), Estonian actress
