= Estonian Scout Association =

National Scouting organization in Estonia

- Estonian Scout Association
- Headquarters: Tallinn
- Country: Estonia
- Founded: 1921
- Membership: 1,337
- Affiliation: World Organization of the Scout Movement
- Website http://www.skaut.ee

Estonian Scout Association (Estonian: Eesti Skautide Ühing, abbreviated ESÜ) is the primary national Scouting organization of Estonia, became a member of the World Organization of the Scout Movement in 1996. The coeducational Eesti Skautide Ühing has 1,337 members as of 2011.

== History ==
Scouting was initially established in Estonia in 1911 as part of the Russian Empire, and the first Scout troop was formed in the west coast town of Pärnu in 1912 in what was then the Livonia Governorate. According to its founders, Scouting was registered with the central organization of the tsarist Russian Scout movement Русский Скаут as the first Scout troop in the Baltic provinces. As far as is known today, the Pärnu Troop remained the only one of its kind in the region for four years. In spite of its relatively isolated existence, it developed a remarkable degree of imagination and variety in its activities. In planning and organizing the troop's program, Baden-Powell's Scouting for Boys was studied closely, and its activities emphasized the acquisition not only of Scouting skills, but also of proficiency in various crafts and trades carried out with accompanying tests for which the Pärnu Scouts prepared by working as volunteer helpers with local carpenters, blacksmiths, electricians, and various other tradesmen. During their summer vacations they worked for room and board at a nearby estate, some working in the fields, others in the workshops of the estate.

Within the Estonian Governorate it was not until 1916 that any Scout troops were organized. In Tallinn and Tartu, the movement was started at the initiative of a few enthusiasts, while it was introduced into several smaller towns by students from high schools which had been evacuated northward from Latvia in order to escape the advancing German armies. Local boys were admitted into these Scout Troops, but this privilege was short-lived.

Estonia was soon occupied, and refugees were evacuated further into the inner Russian provinces. Most of the Scouts were among the refugees. This was the end of Scouting in these towns, but not in the larger centers. In Tartu, the second largest city in Estonia and the seat of a 300-year-old university, Scout troops were organized at every large school with no other aid than a Russian translation of Baden-Powell's 'Scouting for Boys' and some consultation with a visiting Scouts in uniform from Pärnu. A few patrols of these troops were even able to continue their activities when Scouting was banned during the following German occupation. The Estonian War of Liberation, however, brought a pause to Scouting in Tartu as most boys over 16 (many even younger) volunteered for the fighting forces. But they restored their troops and patrols as soon as they were able to return to their school benches; one of these Scouts, now in the United States, is still active among Scouts of Estonian extraction.

In Tallinn, the first two Scout troops were started in 1916 by Anton Õunapuu (1887–1919), a teacher of physical education who had studied in Finland and had there acquainted himself with Scouting. The Estonian Boy Scouts consider him their "founding father", although his activity was short-lived; he fell in a battle of the War of Liberation in April 1919. His death became a symbol of the spirit of Scouting. It also brought about in Tallinn the immediate election of a Staff with Commissioners, to head the planning and execution of various Scouting activities. This organization provided the nucleus that later developed into the Estonian Scout Headquarters, which was to lead Estonian Scouting until its liquidation by the Soviet occupational authorities in 1940.

=== Founding of Estonian Scouting ===
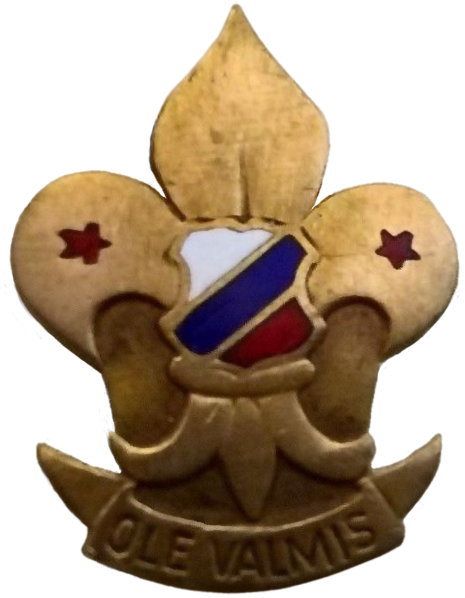
Estonian Boy Scout badge during the Russian Empire, used between 1916 and 1921 before independence

An enormous increase in membership made existing facilities, even in the larger towns with their experienced Scouts and leaders, inadequate to efficiently organize and train all the boys who desired to join the Tanks of Sooldin. Furthermore, there had been no central organization which could coordinate a program and provide assistance to the individual troops.

To remedy the existing conditions the First Estonian Scout Conference was held in Tartu in March 1921. At this Conference all the major principles of Estonian Scouting were established, and the much needed central organization, The Estonian Boy Scout Association, was founded at this conference. On this occasion, one of the most noted and able Estonian public figures, Jaan Hünerson, later to become the Minister of Education of the Estonian Republic, became the chief of staff of their headquarters.

Estonian Scouting was a founding member of the World Organization from 1922 to 1940. The Estonian Boy Scout Association joined the international Scouting scene very early. Under the leadership of its International Commissioner, Baldwin Rautsman, who occupied this post from 1920 to 1940, a contingent of 10 Scouts represented Estonia at the first World Jamboree in London, in 1920.

One of the major events of early Estonian Scouting was the reception of the World Chief-Scout, Lord Baden Powell of Gilwell, who visited Tallinn on August 19, 1933. Scouts from every part of the country rallied to the capital. It is not known exactly how many were on hand, but even the most modest estimates give a figure as large as the number of participants in the biggest Scout camp ever to be held in Estonia.

The foremost achievement of Estonian Scouting was the third Suurlaager, held in 1936 and attended by approximately 2000 boys, including 480 from abroad. Among the foreign guests were 300 Finns, large contingents from Latvia, Lithuania, Sweden, Denmark, Poland, and a few representatives from Hungary and Norway. The third Suurlaager, which had, as did the preceding one, Herbert Michelson for its Camp Chief, remained the biggest achievement of Estonian Scouting. As a result of the Soviet occupation of Estonia, Scouting was liquidated and banned from 1940 onwards.

Immediately following their seizure of power in June 1940, the paramilitary Estonian Defence League and its youth organizations, Noored Kotkad and Kodutütred, were abolished. The Boy Scouts and Girl Guides were tentatively permitted to continue their activities, but the operation of camps was forbidden. Thus the first Estonian Wood Badge course, which was to open in July, 1940 could not be held. The Scouts and other remaining Estonian organizations were compelled to participate in political meetings and demonstrations organized by the Soviet authorities. In August, 1940 the representatives of all sponsoring bodies were ordered to a meeting with the ostensible purpose of electing a new executive for the "Federation of Friends of Scouts" and new Headquarters staffs for the Boy Scout and Girl Guide Associations. No elections were held; instead the Communist Party representative announced the new members of the above organizations all positions were filled by Communists. The new Communist headquarters issued only one order, to liquidate the organizations and to surrender all property, including documents and archives, to the Komsomol Communist youth organization. The Soviets justified this move by claiming that Scouting was a disguised Anglo-American espionage organization.

Estonian Scouting was not broken by the liquidation of their organizations by the Soviet occupational authorities in 1940; nor was it crushed by the following German occupation of 1941–1944. This became quite evident during the final stages of World War II when Estonian refugees reached those countries and areas where they were at liberty to reorganize their Movements.

In order to unify all Estonian Scouting organizations in exile, two independent organizations were formed, one for Boy Scouts and the other for Girl Guides. The central organization for boys was established on the initiative of the Central Bureau of the Estonian Boy Scouts in Germany, the only legally recognized Estonian Scouting organization. The Charter of the "Estonian Boy Scouts in Exile" was signed in London on August 1, 1949, by the representatives of Estonian Scouts from Germany and Great Britain. This new organization was later joined by the Estonian Scouts in the United States and Australia, but universal membership could be assured only after the statutes had been modified. At this occasion the name was changed to the present one, "The Estonian Boy Scout Associations in Exile".

The executive organ of the Boy Scouts is a Central Bureau under the direction of a Secretary General. The more important decisions of the "Estonian Boy Scout Associations in Exile" are submitted to a Council composed of representatives of the constituent organizations. This Council never meets; its members decide the issues in question by voting by mail.

The post of Secretary General has up to now had four incumbents. The location of the Boy Scouts Central Bureau and the majority of its members is usually, although not necessarily, determined by the residence of the Secretary General. Herbert Michelson was Secretary-General for the Central Bureau from 1949 to 1953, living at first in Germany and later in the United States. The second Secretary General, Walter Koppemnan (1953–1955) directed the alteration of the statutes and the reorganization of the activities from Philadelphia. The third incumbent, Aksel Salumets (1955–1957), was from Toronto, Canada, where after the Executive Secretary moved to Helsingborg, Sweden, where the fourth Secretary General, Aksel Vaigur resides. Re-elected once (in 1960) he has held his office until present day.

Estonian Scouts have been present at every World Scout Jamboree and Rover Moot, although after World War II, they were compelled to arrive and participate in these events with contingents of other countries. The only exceptions were the World Jamboree at Moisson in 1947 in which 36 Estonian DP-Scouts from Germany took part under the Estonian colors; and the Jubilee Jamboree at Sutton Park, England, in 1957, where it was possible for Estonian Scouts to fly their own flag in the camp allotted to the Federation of Scouts in Exile.

=== Rebirth of Estonian Scouting ===
Estonian Scouting was reborn as soon as the country regained its independence in 1989. Eesti Skautide Ühing was founded in 1995, and has been recognized and rejoined as the 140th member of World Organization of the Scout Movement in January 1996. When founded, Eesti Skautide Ühing had 200-300 members in several counties of Estonia.

Membership in Eesti Skautide Ühing is open to all young people in Estonia, with 1,199 male and female members as of 2004. The association's national headquarters are at Tallinn. Members of the association have participated in international events, including Eurofolk 1993, the 1994 and 2005 EuroJam (European Jamboree), the 1995 and 1999 World Jamborees and various European Region seminars. Leaders have also attended training courses provided by Scout associations in Denmark, Finland and Canada.

== Program sections ==
Since 2005, the program sections are

- Hundud (Cub Scouts) - 6 to 10
- Skaudid (Scouts) - 11 to 14
- Vanemskaudid (Ventures) - 15 to 17
- Rändurid (Rovers) - 18 to 26

== Scout ideals ==
The Scout Motto is Ole Valmis, translated as Be Prepared in Estonian. The Estonian noun for a single Scout is skaut.

=== Scout Oath ===
Tõotan pühalikult püüda teha parimat, et austada Jumalat, täita kohust Eesti, mu isamaa ees, aidata kaasinimest ja järgida skaudiseadusi.

I pledge solemnly to do the best, to honour the God, to fulfill my duty for Estonia, for my fatherland, to help others and pursue the Scout laws.

=== Scout Law ===
Skaut on usaldatav - a Scout is trustworthy
Skaut on truu - a Scout is faithful
Skaut on abivalmis - a Scout is helpful
Skaut on sõbralik ja rõõmus - a Scout is affable and merry
Skaut on viisakas - a Scout is polite
Skaut on looduse sõber - a Scout is a friend of nature
Skaut austab ennast ja teisi - a Scout is considerate for himself and others
Skaut on sihikindel ja visa - a Scout is persevering and single-minded
Skaut on kokkuhoidlik ja töökas - a Scout is frugal and industrious
Skaut on puhas mõttes, sõnas ja teos - a Scout is clean in thought, word and deed

== See also ==
- Estonian Guides Association
