= Harald Nugiseks =

Estonian military personnel (1921–2014)

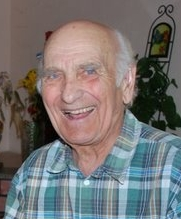
- Nugiseks, 2009
- Born: 22 October 1921; Karjaküla, Särevere Parish, Järva County, Estonia
- Died: 2 January 2014 (aged 92); Pärnu, Estonia
- Military career
- Allegiance: Nazi Germany
- Branch: Security units (1941–1943); Waffen-SS (1943–1945)
- Service years: 1941–1945
- Rank: Waffen-Oberscharführer (Corporal/Sergeant)
- Unit: 20th Waffen Grenadier Division of the SS (1st Estonian)
- Conflicts: World War II Eastern Front Battle of Narva including: Battle for Narva Bridgehead Upper Silesian offensive
- Awards: Iron Cross 2nd & 1st class

Harald Nugiseks (22 October 1921 – 2 January 2014) was an Estonian serviceman in the Waffen-SS of Nazi Germany during World War II. A Waffen-Oberscharführer (sergeant), he served in the 20th Waffen Grenadier Division of the SS (1st Estonian). Nugiseks was one of the four Estonians to receive the Knight's Cross of the Iron Cross.

== Biography ==
Harald Nugiseks was born on Vanaõu farmstead, Karjaküla village, Järva County, Estonia. His parents were farmers, and he attended the primary school at Laupa. His father, August Nugiseks, had participated in the Estonian War of Independence with the Järva Defence Battalion. Harald was a member of the Järva regiment of the Young Eagles when he was of school age. He studied at the Türi Horticultural High School, which he did not graduate from, but continued his studies at the Paide Trade School in 1939.

Nugiseks joined the Estonian Security battalion from the Paide Trade School on 2 October 1941. Nugiseks became part of 185th battalion of General Georg von Kuchler's 18th Army officially known as Estnische Sicherungs Abteilung which was used as a security unit in the rearguard.

In 1943, Nugiseks volunteered for the Estonian Legion. Three Estonian volunteer battalions were sent to Volkhov, when Nugiseks joined 660th commanded by Major Ellram. The 1st Estonian SS Volunteers was formed at Debica, Poland in August 1942 from police battalions such as Nugiseks'. By March 1943 the unit was fighting with the 5th SS Panzer Division Wiking on the Mius Front in Ukraine. Two months later it was expanded into a No. 3 Brigade consisting of two regiments, of three battalions each. They fought in hard battles against Communist Partisans and Soviet Regulars on the Nevel Front, and then in the Battle of Velikiye Luki. In December 1943, Nugiseks was transferred to the 16th Army. In February 1944 his brigade joined Felix Steiner's III (Germanic) SS Panzer Corps.

Nugiseks took part in fighting along the right bank of the Narva River. Nugiseks received the Knight's Cross of the Iron Cross for leading the capture of the Vaasa-Siivertsi-Vepsküla bridgehead. As the I Battalion, Waffen-Grenadier Regiment der SS 46, lost almost all of its officers, Nugiseks stepped in as the leader of the attack. He immediately changed tactics, loading a supply of hand grenade onto sledges so the stormtroopers would not have to crawl back for supplies over the minefields. With hand grenades being passed on along the line of trenches, a bridgehead was at last squeezed in from the north by "rolling" tactics, his platoon engaged in desperate hand-to-hand fighting using spades, hand grenades and bayonets. Nugiseks was mentioned in the Wehrmachtbericht and in the Nazi Signal magazine following his Knight's Cross award, which was personally given to him by the SA occupation head in Estonia, Karl-Siegmund Litzmann on 9 April 1944, while Nugiseks was recuperating in Türi hospital. With Nugiseks being the second Estonian to receive the award, the whole ceremony was filmed for propaganda purposes. In the action the divisional commander Standartenfuhrer Franz Augsberger was wounded and also received the Knights Cross. Unterscharfuhrer Nugiseks was only 22 years old leading a Zugfuhrer (platoon leader) of Estonians defending the homeland against invasion for his unit I.46. and the first non-officer to be so awarded.

Afterwards Nugiseks was demoted for fighting with some soldiers who were harassing Red Cross nurses. During the Soviet assault on Estonia in September 1944, Nugiseks' home was destroyed. Nugiseks was captured by Czech partisans in May 1945 and put in a prisoner-of-war camp. After three unsuccessful escape attempts, he served time after being handed over to the Soviets, who had sentenced him to ten years in the Gulag and five years deportation in Siberia. Nugiseks managed to return to Estonia in 1958: on release from Tyumenskaya oblast he worked as a labourer in Pärnu area of Estonia until his retirement.

In the 1970s, he constructed a house for the family using his own hands. On 21 February 1994, service to his country was recognised when Major-General Aleksander Einseln made Nugiseks a Retired Captain (erukapten) of the Estonian Defence Forces. Nugiseks attended reburial of Alfons Rebane, another Estonian Knight's Cross of the Iron Cross holder, ordered by the Estonian government. After 4229 signatures were collected in October 2008, Captain Nugiseks was awarded the Medal of Gratitude by the people of Estonia for his part in the fight against Bolshevism. After he died in 2014, he was buried in Tori, Estonia with full military honors. Defense minister Urmas Reinsalu said that "[Nugiseks] was a legendary Estonian soldier whose tragedy was that he could not fight for Estonian freedom in an Estonian uniform."

Revered and honoured by his community, a bust was posthumously installed at his school.

== See also ==
- Battle for Narva Bridgehead
- Battle of Narva (1944)
- 20th Waffen Grenadier Division of the SS (1st Estonian)
- Volunteer Legion Netherlands
