= Guard Battalion (Estonia) =

Estonian specialized unit

- Vahipataljon
- Insignia of the Guard Battalion
- Active: January 9, 1919 – June 17, 1940; January 22, 1993 – present
- Country: Estonia
- Branch: Estonian Defence Forces
- Type: Honor Guard
- Role: Ceremonial guard
- Size: Battalion
- Part of: Military Police
- Garrison/HQ: Paldiski, Tallinna mnt 7
- Nickname: Presidendi Kaardivägi (Presidential Guard)
- Motto: Eesti kodu kaitseks (For the protection of the Estonian home)
- Anniversaries: 11 January

Commanders
- Current commander: Major Lauri Kuusekänd
- Notable commanders: Riho Terras

Insignia
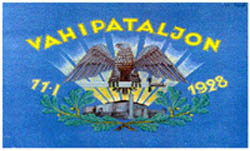
- Flag

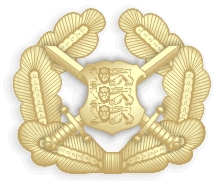
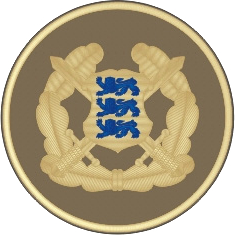
- Cap Badge of the Ceremonial Guard

The Military Police Guard Battalion (Estonian: Sõjaväepolitsei Vahipataljon), or simply Guard Battalion is specialized unit under the Military Police of the Estonian Defence Forces, which conducts ceremonial duties and prepares military police units. It is based in Paldiski and specialized in urban warfare.

The Guard Battalion also has the duty of carrying the guard of honour at presidential palace and welcoming foreign diplomats and political guests.

== History ==
=== 1919–1940 ===
The Guard Battalion was first created on 9 January 1919 from a battalion of the Estonian Defense League. It served as an auxiliary law enforcement unit in Tallinn that doubled as a ceremonial unit used at funerals and reception ceremonies for foreign guests. On 25 February 1919, it was officially renamed to the Guard Battalion. On 1 June of the following year it was renamed to the Tallinn Single Guard Battalion. Single Guard Battalion manned the president's Kadriorg Palace honor guard. During that time the honor guard was much more larger than today. Battalion needed to put 564 men to service for 24 hours. Soldiers had 24 hours of service and 24 hours free. On 20 May 1939, by order of President Konstantin Päts, 11 January 1928 was declared to be the birthday of the unit. On 1 July 1930, the Tallinn Garrison Command and Guard Battalion were formed as an independent institution. On 19 April 1940, the battalion was approved a unit flag donated by the Bank of Estonia. After the Soviet invasion of Estonia, the unit was moved out of its barracks and phased into the 21st Rifle Regiment.

=== Since 1993 ===
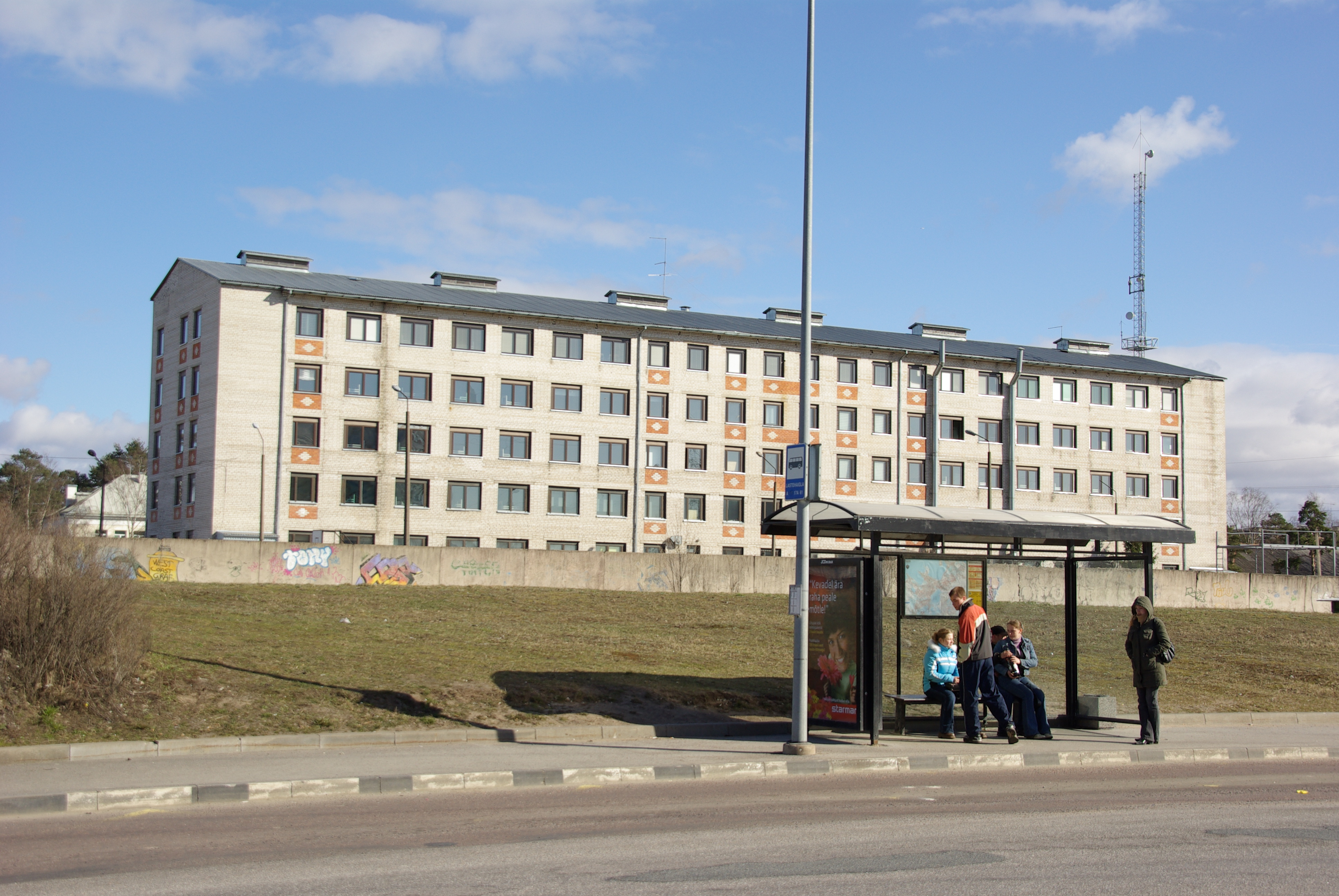
Guard Battalion barracks from 1995 to 2015 in Rahumäe, Tallinn

The modern Single Guard Battalion was reestablished on 22 January 1993 on the basis of the formerly Internal Defense Guard Regiment, which was previously engaged in incarceration services. December 17, 1993, by a decree of that time commander of the Estonian Defence Forces Aleksander Einseln, the A-Company of the Single Guard Battalion was designated as a permanent honor company. In the beginning the honor company performed their ceremonial duties in tactical uniform, with the addition of a white belt and white gloves.

Three different ceremonial uniforms which represented all military forces (Land force, Air force, Navy) were introduced in 1998 and they were firstly used during the visit of the Slovenian president.

On 1 May 2003, a battalion known as the Single Guard was renamed the Infantry Training Center before being changed at the outset of 2009 to the Guard Battalion. After the structural changes in 2003, the A-Company which performed honor guard and ceremonial duties was liquidated. Since then, the entire Guard Battalion personnel participates in the honor guard.

Since 2014, it has been subordinated to the Sõjaväepolitsei, being part of the Northern Defense District until then. In March 2015, it moved to the Estonian Navy's Mine Harbor base, until sometime in early 2022 when the battalion was moved to Paldiski.

To reduce administrative burden and focus more on the development of training and combat readiness, Air Force and Navy ceremonial uniforms were removed. Since 2021 the Guard Battalion uses only Land Force ceremonial uniform during ceremonies and in the honor guard.

== List of commanders ==
- Colonel Oskar Raudvere (1919–1934)
- Lieutenant Colonel Jaan Junkur (1934–1939)
- Lieutenant Colonel Juhan Tuuling (1939–1940)
- Major Jaan Ilm (1992–1994)
- Lieutenant Colonel Manivald Kasepõld (1994–1995)
- Lieutenant Colonel Vahur Väljamäe (1995–1997)
- Lieutenant Sander Kesküla (1997–1998)
- Lieutenant Colonel Riho Terras (1998–2000)
- Captain Madis Uibopuu (2000–2002)
- Major Rene Brus (2002–2007)
- Major Rasmus Lippur (2007–2009)
- Major Toomas Väli (2009–2011)
- Lieutenant Colonel Kalle Teras (2011–2013)
- Lieutenant Colonel Kaido Sirman (2013–2015)
- Major Martin Kukk (2015–2018)
- Major Romet Kaevu (acting) (2018–2019)
- Lieutenant Colonel Margot Künnapuu (2019–2024)
- Lieutenant Colonel Artur Meerits (2024–2026)
- Major Lauri Kuusekänd (2026–present)

== Unit structure ==
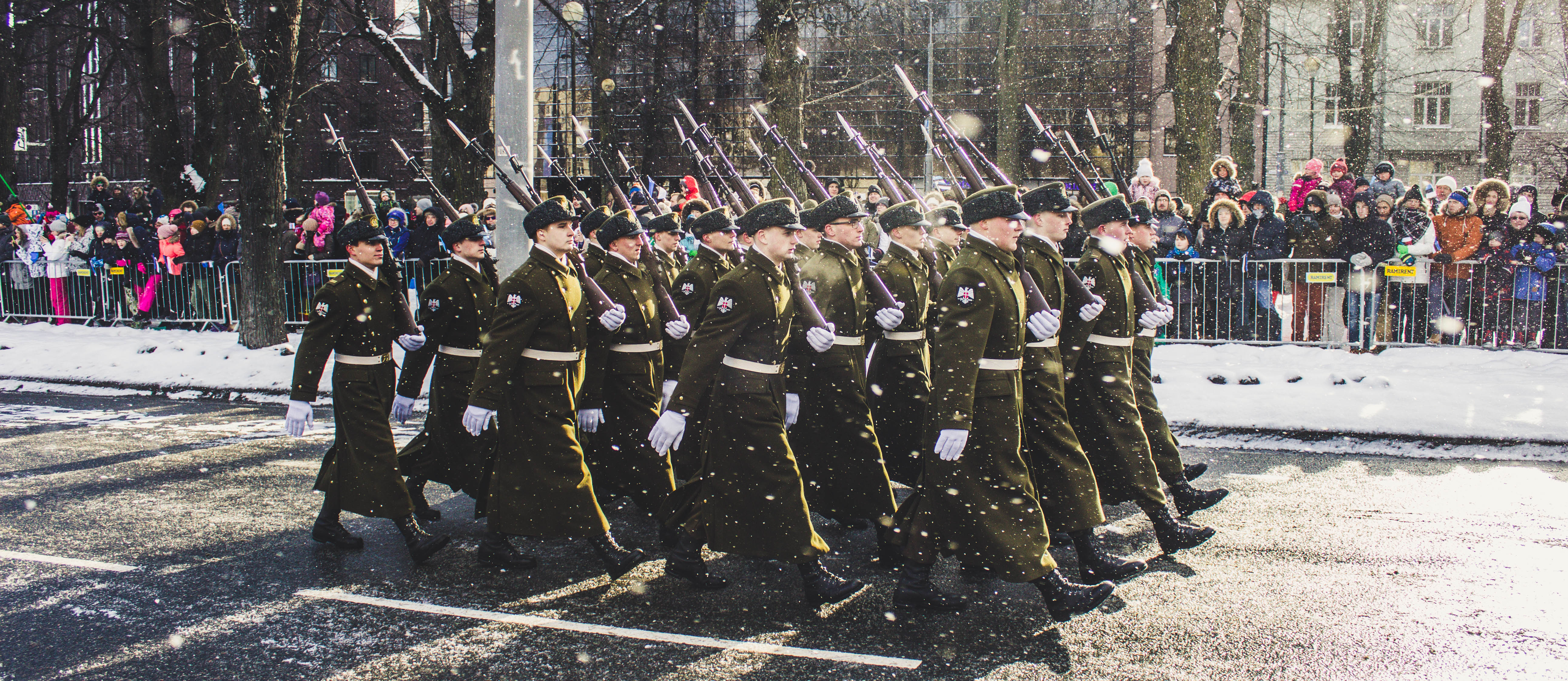
The Guard Battalion during the Estonia 100 parade

- Headquarters
  - 1. Military Police Company
  - 2. Military Police Company
  - Staff and Support Center

Almost 300 conscripts are serving in the battalion every year. It is the only unit with conscripts in a military police role in the Estonian Defense Forces.

== Garrison ==
In 2015, the battalion was moved from its old base in Rahumäe to the base of the Estonian Navy. The old premises in suburbs of Tallinn was sold together with the old barracks of Logistics Battalion. Since then, the Guard Battalion has been in excellent living conditions for conscripts in renovated historical barracks. In 2022 the Guard Battalion moved to Paldiski when the new building was completed.

== Symbols ==
=== Emblem ===
Guard Battalion emblem

In the emblem there is depicted an eagle holding a sword, who has a small coat of arms of Harju County on his chest. The eagle symbolizes the battalion's unity and vigilance. The sword represents the readiness to defend their home land and the coat of arms shows the location of the battalion.

=== Flag ===
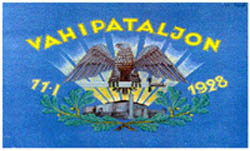
Guard Battalion flag

In the middle of the flag there is an eagle holding a sword in the blue background. Under the eagle there is depicted a Toompea Castle, where the Estonian tricolor flutters in the Pikk Hermann tower. Behind the castle there are seven sunbeams rising across the flag. Two green oak branches are placed crosswise under the castle. The numbers on the flag means the founding date of the battalion which is 11 January 1928. In the top of the flag there is written Vahipataljon which means Guard Battalion in Estonian.

== Notable members ==
- Uku Suviste, representative of Estonia in the Eurovision Song Contest 2020.
- Risto Lumi, a former commander of the Intelligence Department of the Headquarters of the Estonian Defence Forces.
- Denis Metsavas, Russian-Estonian soldier and GRU agent convicted of treason.
- Nikolai Karotamm, First Secretary of the Communist Party of Estonia from 1944 to 1950.

== Gallery ==
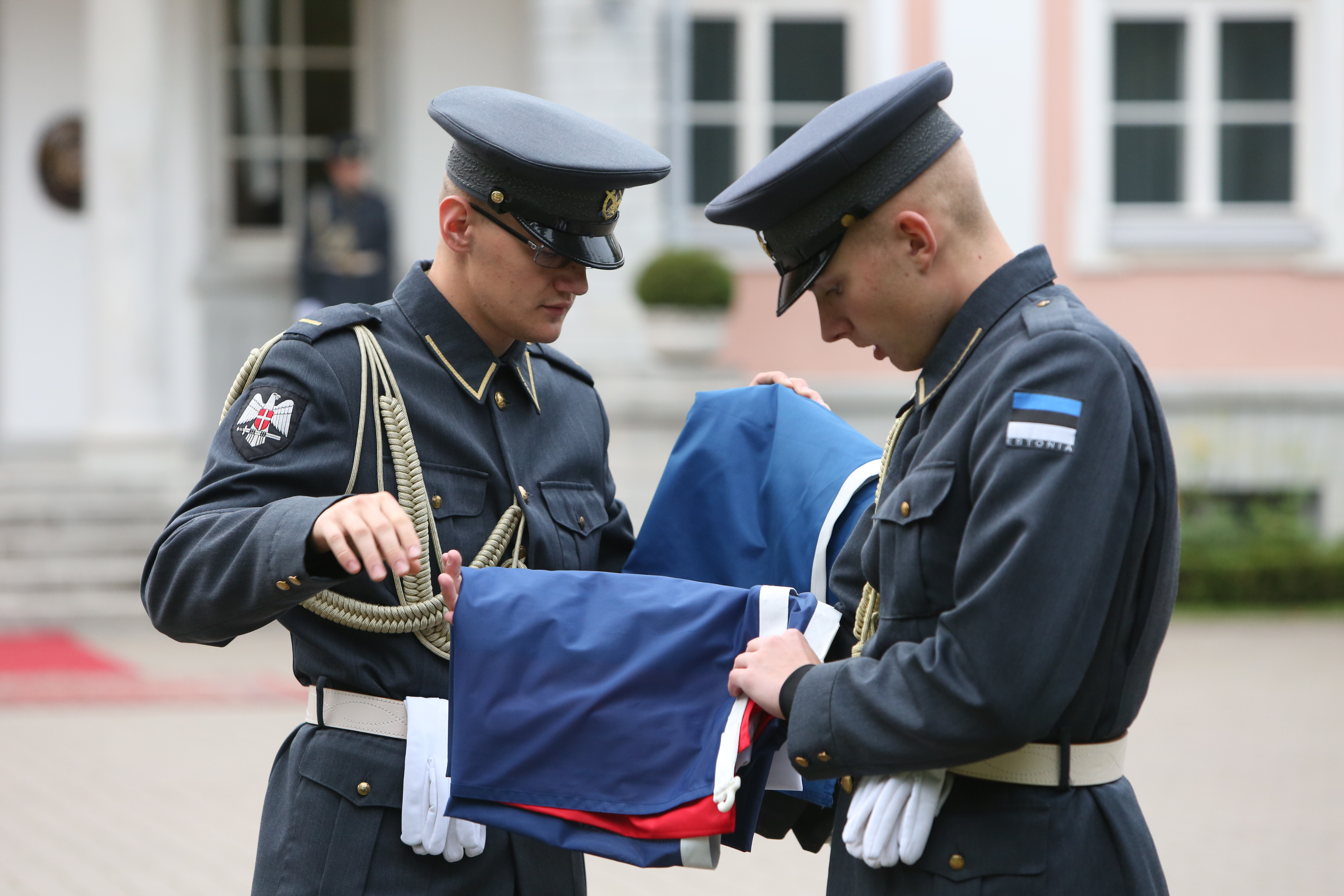

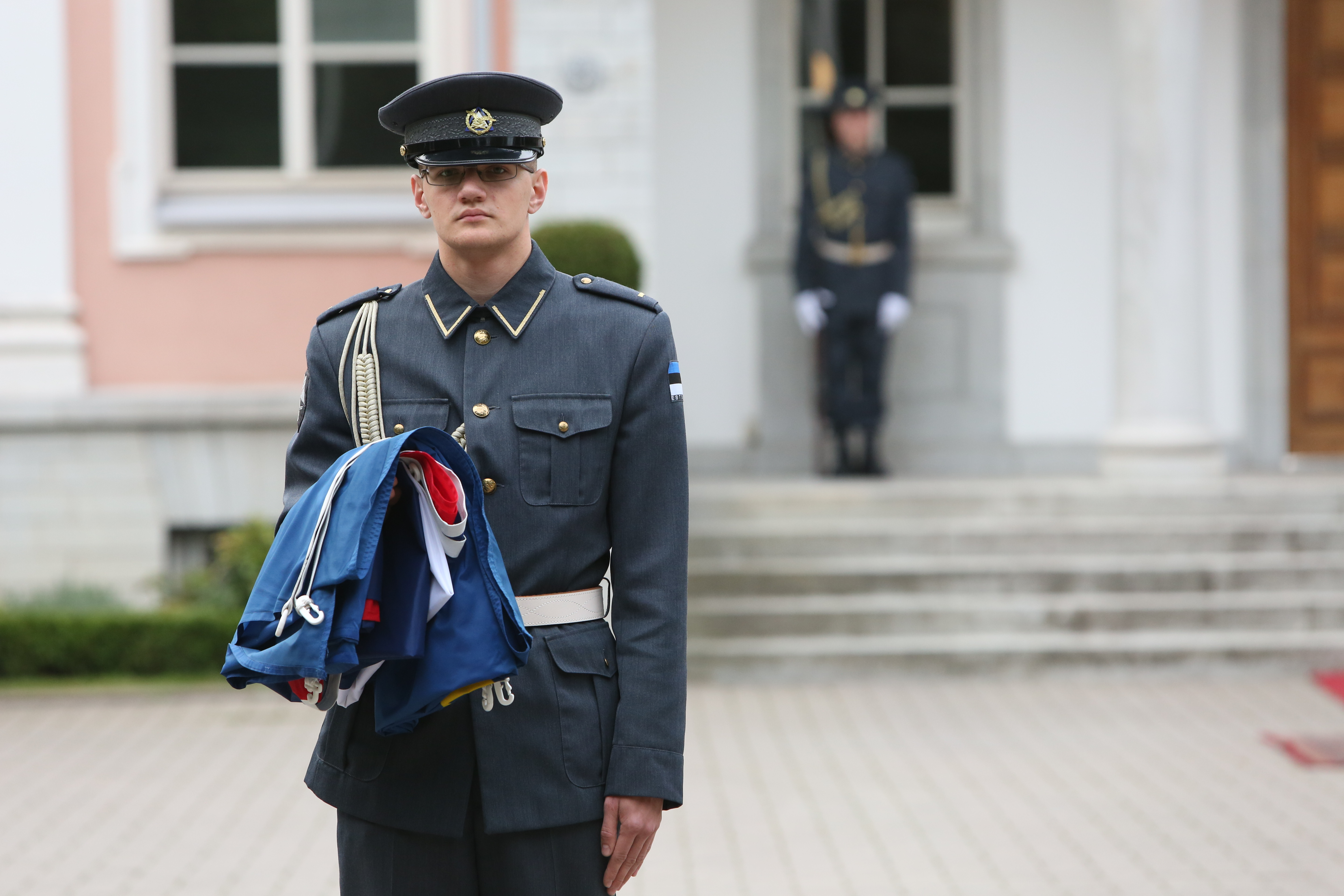
Guard Battalion soldier in blue Air Force uniform

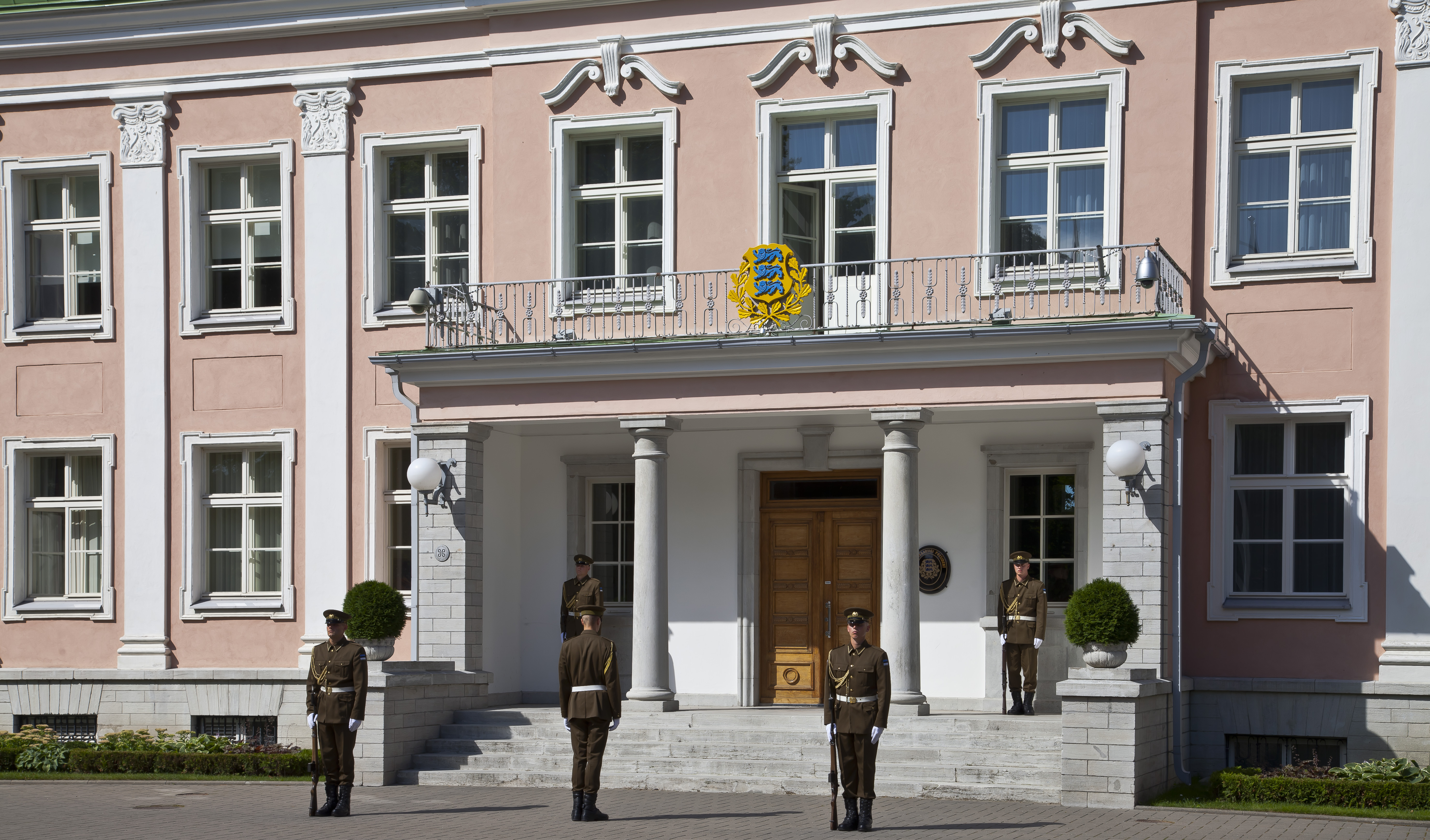
Guard change at the presidential palace.

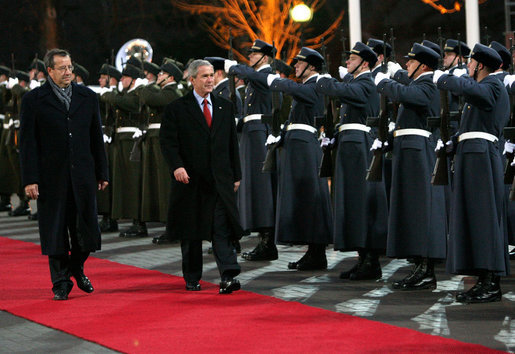
Honour company welcoming US president George W. Bush.

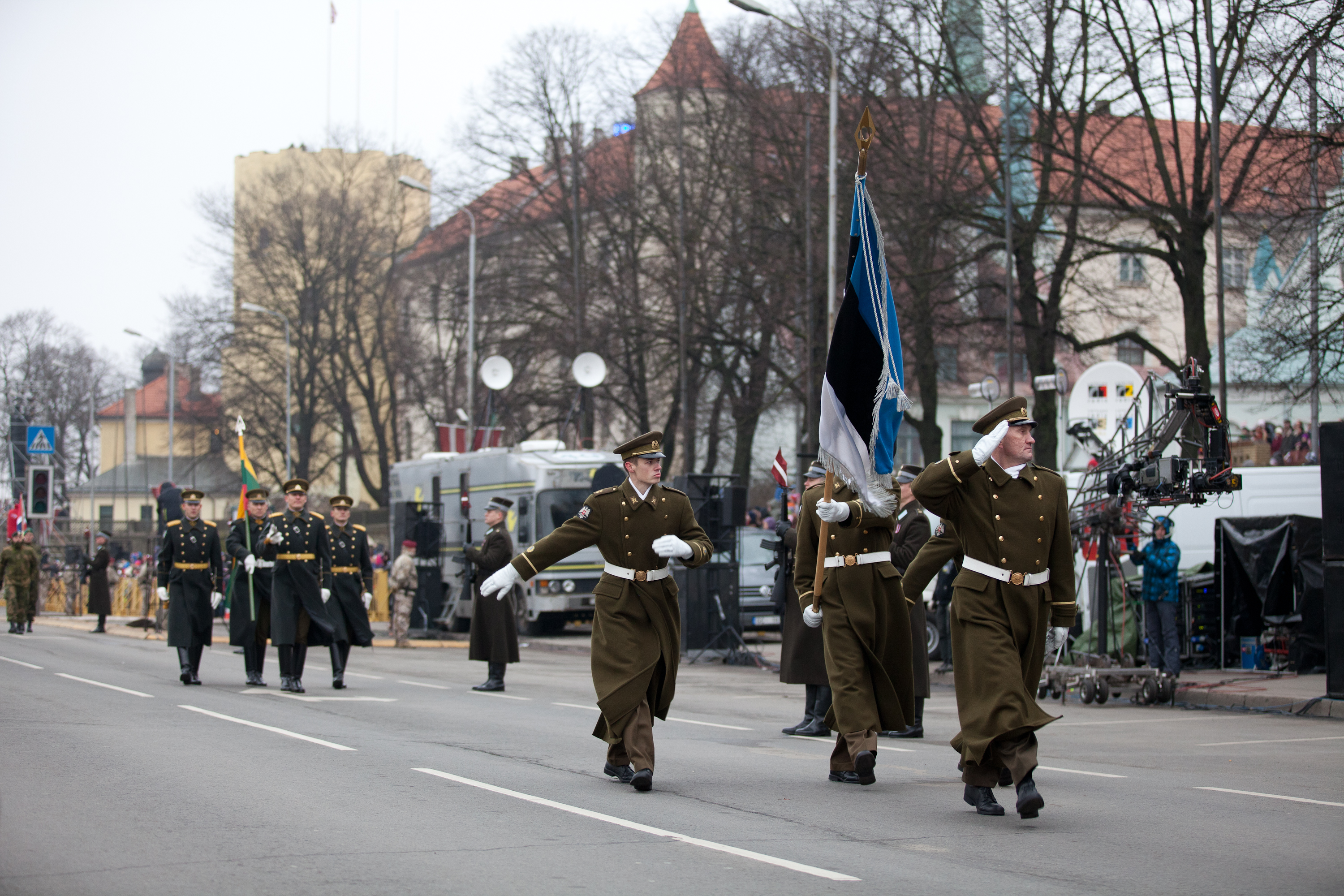
Guard Battalion soldiers marching at the military parade in Riga

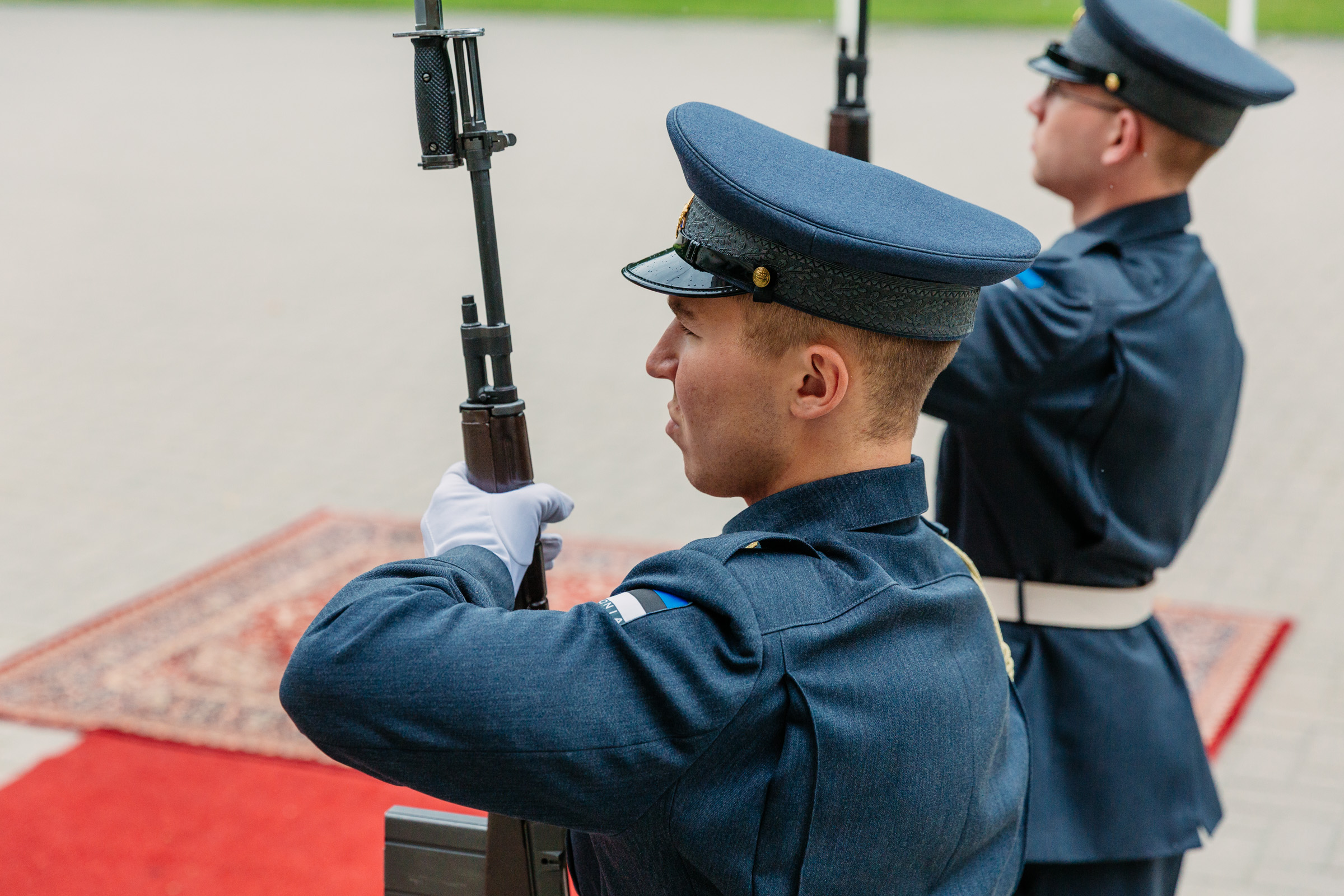
Guard Battalion soldiers on present arms

== See also ==
- Estonian Defence Forces
- Headquarters of the Estonian Defence Forces
- Kaitseväe Orkester
- Military Police
- Grand Duke Gediminas Staff Battalion
- Latvian National Armed Forces Staff Battalion
