= Rebo =

Rebo may refer to:

== People ==
- Eero Rebo (born 1974), Estonian colonel
- Rebo Tchulo (born 1997), Congolese singer

== Fictional characters ==
- Rebo, from Babylon 5
- Max Rebo, from Star Wars
- Rebo (comics)

== Other ==
- Rebo (grape)
- Reactive empirical bond order
