= Kuul =

Kuul is a surname. Notable people with the surname include:

- Margus Kuul (born 1979), Estonian military officer
- Oskar Kuul (1924–1992), Estonian collective farm manager

== See also ==
- KUUL, American radio station
