= Manivald Kasepõld =

Estonian military personnel

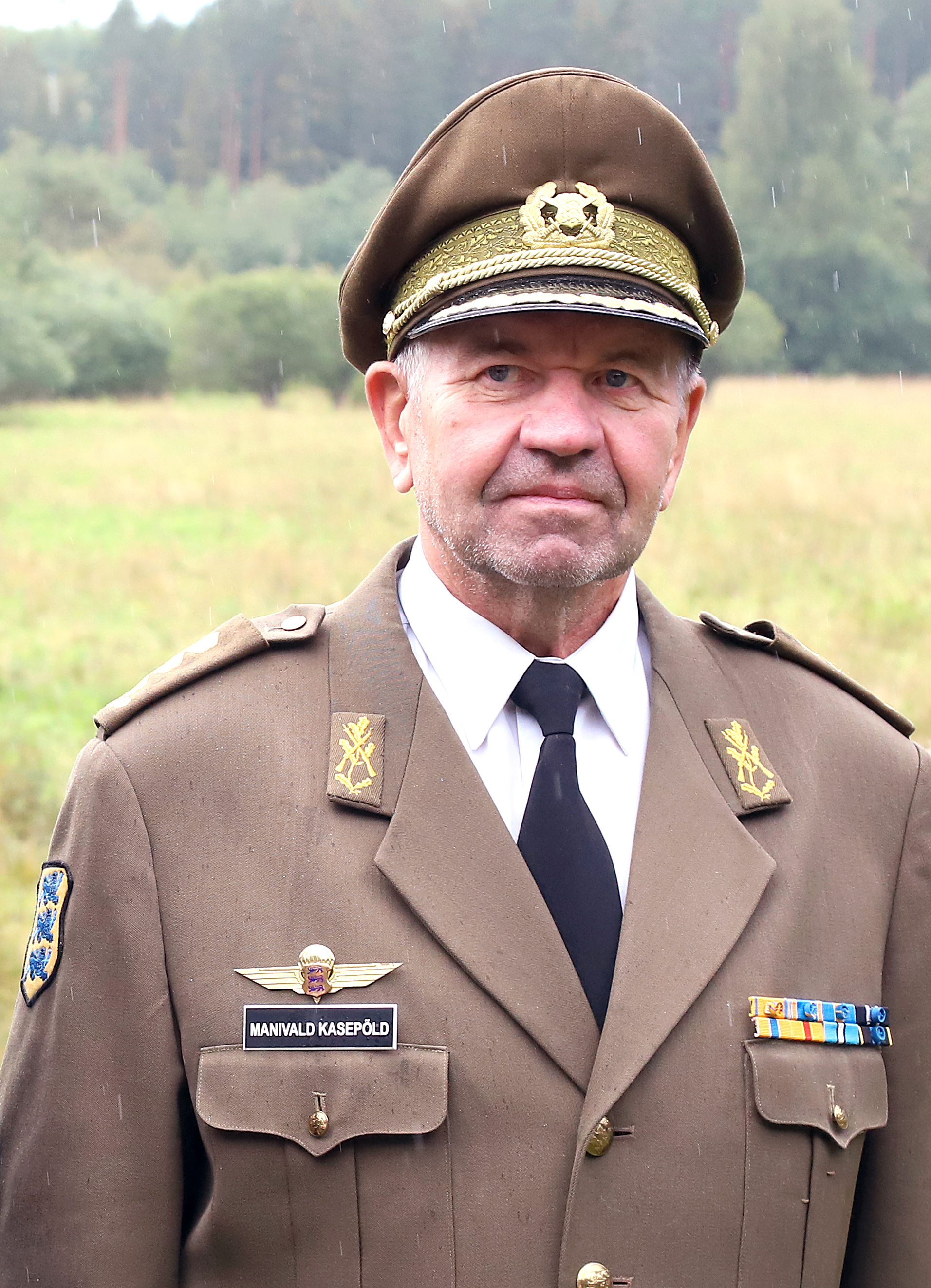
Manivald Kasepõld (2021)

Manivald Kasepõld (born 15 February 1952) is an Estonian military personnel.

From 10 November 1990 to 16 November 1992, he was the chief of Estonian Defence League. He has also been the chief of Guard Battalion.

== Awards ==
- Estonian Defence Forces's Order of the White Cross, III class.
