= Presidential Palace (Tallinn) =

Building in Tallinn

Residence of the President of Estonia
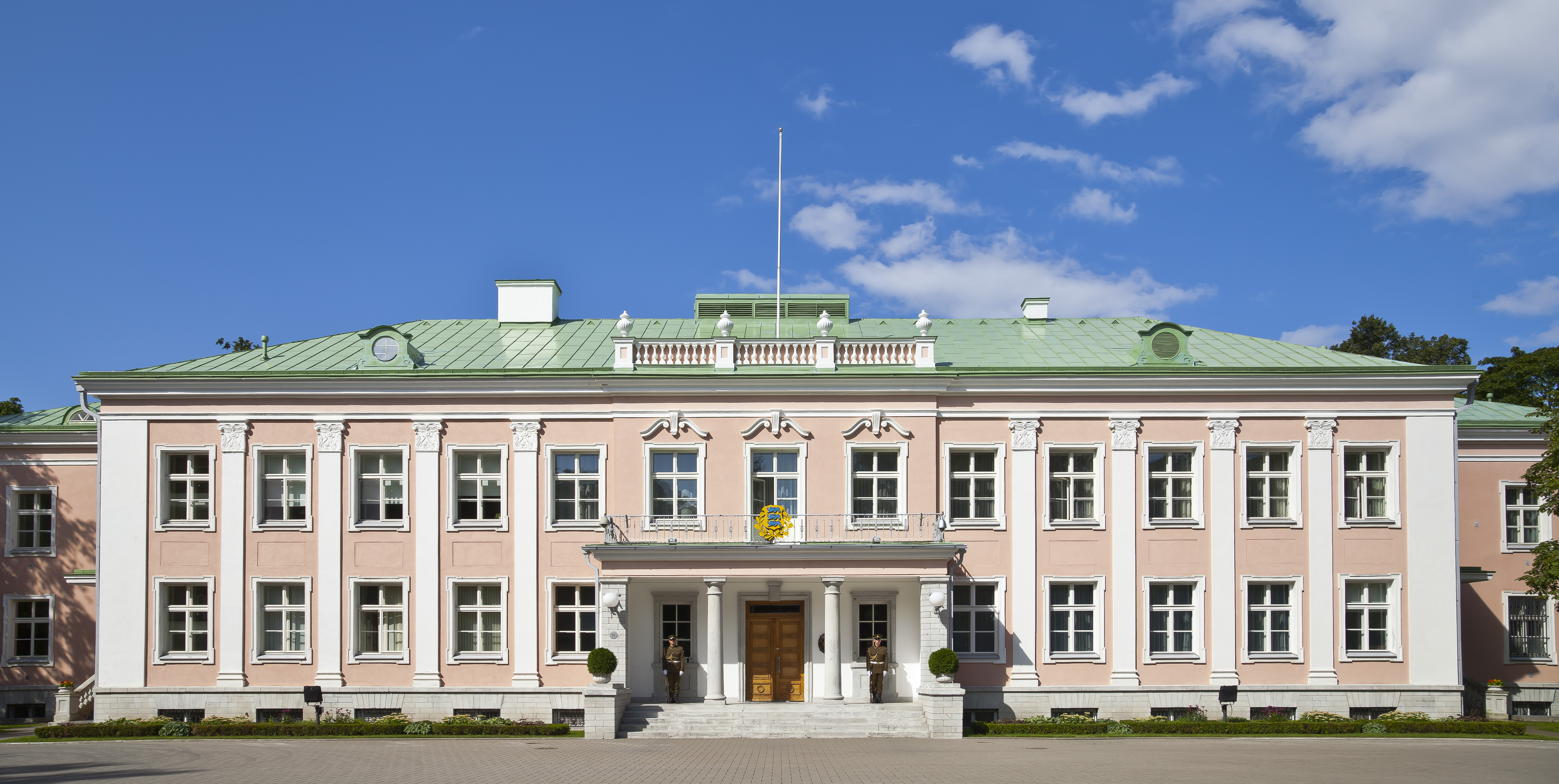
- Interactive map of the Residence of the President of Estonia area
- Former names: Kadriorg administrative building

General information
- Status: Completed
- Classification: Private
- Location: Kadriorg, A. Weizenbergi 39, Tallinn, Estonia
- Coordinates: 59.437839°N 24.793944°E
- Current tenants: President of Estonia
- Completed: 1938; 88 years ago
- Owner: Government of Estonia

Height
- Architectural: Baroque Revival

Design and construction
- Architect: Alar Kotli

Website
- www.president.ee/en/

The Residence of the President of Estonia, known officially as the Kadriorg Administrative Building, and since 1992 sometimes colloquially as the "president's palace", is a building located in the Kadriorg Park, Tallinn, capital city of Estonia. The Baroque Revival building serves as the official residence of the president of Estonia.

The palace is guarded by Estonian Guard Battalion.

== History ==
The building was designed by Alar Kotli and completed in 1938. Echoing the Petrine Baroque style of the neighbouring Kadriorg Palace, then the official residence of the Estonian president, it was purpose-built in 1938 to house offices and living apartments to officials. From 1944 to 1990, it housed the Presidium of the Supreme Soviet of the Estonian SSR. After the Republic of Estonia restored full independence in 1991, it became the presidential residence. The first president of the country to reside in the building was Lennart Meri in 1992–2001.

The building is not open to the public.
