= Kajari Klettenberg =

Estonian military personnel

Kajari Klettenberg (born 1966) is an Estonian military colonel.

Since 1992 he is working for Estonian military. From 2007 to 2013 he was the commander of the headquarters of the Estonian Defence League. From 2009 to 2010 he was also the head of the Estonian military contingent in Afghanistan.

In 2002 he was awarded with Order of the Cross of the Eagle, V class.
