= Karjaküla, Järva County =

Village in Estonia

Coordinates: 58°45′N 25°15′E

Karjaküla
- Village
- Interactive map of Karjaküla
- Country: Estonia
- County: Järva County
- Parish: Türi Parish
- Time zone: UTC+2 (EET)
  - Summer (DST): UTC+3 (EEST)

Karjaküla is a village in Türi Parish, Järva County in central Estonia.

Harald Nugiseks (1921–2014), a former SS officer in World War II, was born in Vanaõue farmstead in Karjaküla.
