= Military Police (Estonia) =

- Sõjaväepolitsei
- Active: 1994–present
- Country: Estonia
- Type: Military Police
- Part of: Estonian Defence Forces
- Garrison/HQ: Filtri tee 12, 10132 Tallinn
- Anniversaries: 1 March
- Engagements: Resolute Support Mission

Commanders
- Current commander: Colonel Toomas Väli
- Command Sergeant Major: Sergeant Major Aivar Pennert

Insignia
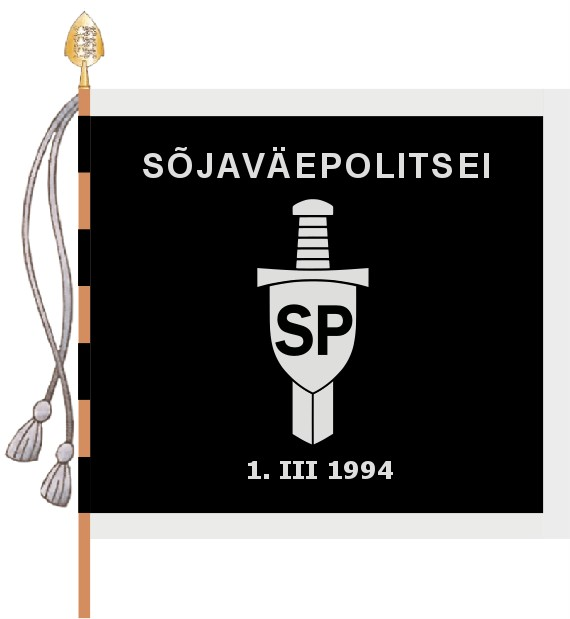
- Flag

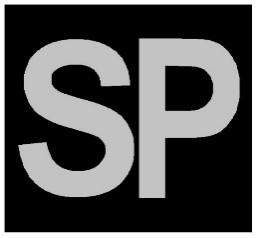
- Shoulder sleeve

The Military Police of the Estonian Defence Forces (Estonian: Eesti Kaitseväe sõjaväepolitsei) is the military police unit of the Estonian Defence Forces. The Estonian military police organization was created in 1994 and its structure includes an investigative department, planning department, logistics department, operational service and the office of the military police. Additionally conscript based reserve- MP platoons are trained every year in Guard Battalion, which is subordinate to the military police. The tasks of the military police include: investigation of serious disciplinary cases and some armed service- related crimes, supervision of military discipline within the Forces, military traffic control and various security tasks. Within conflict/crises areas (Afghanistan) the MP may provide close protection of the Estonian national representative and other visiting VIPs.

Some units of the Estonian Military Police were deployed in Kosovo during the NATO KFOR mission. The members of the military police were assigned to the Italian led Multinational Specialized Unit.

== Current structure ==
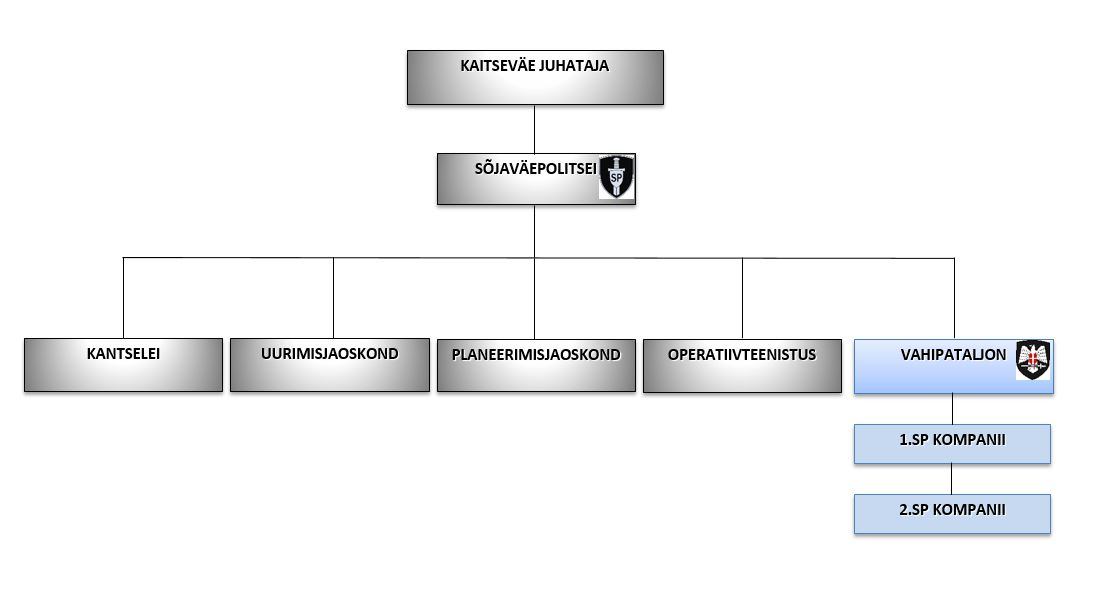
Military Police structure

Military Police:

- Office (Tallinn)
- Investigation Department (Tallinn)
- Planning Department (Tallinn)
- Operational service (Tallinn)
- Guard Battalion (Paldiski)
  - 1. SP Company
  - 2. SP Company

== Equipment ==
=== Vehicles ===
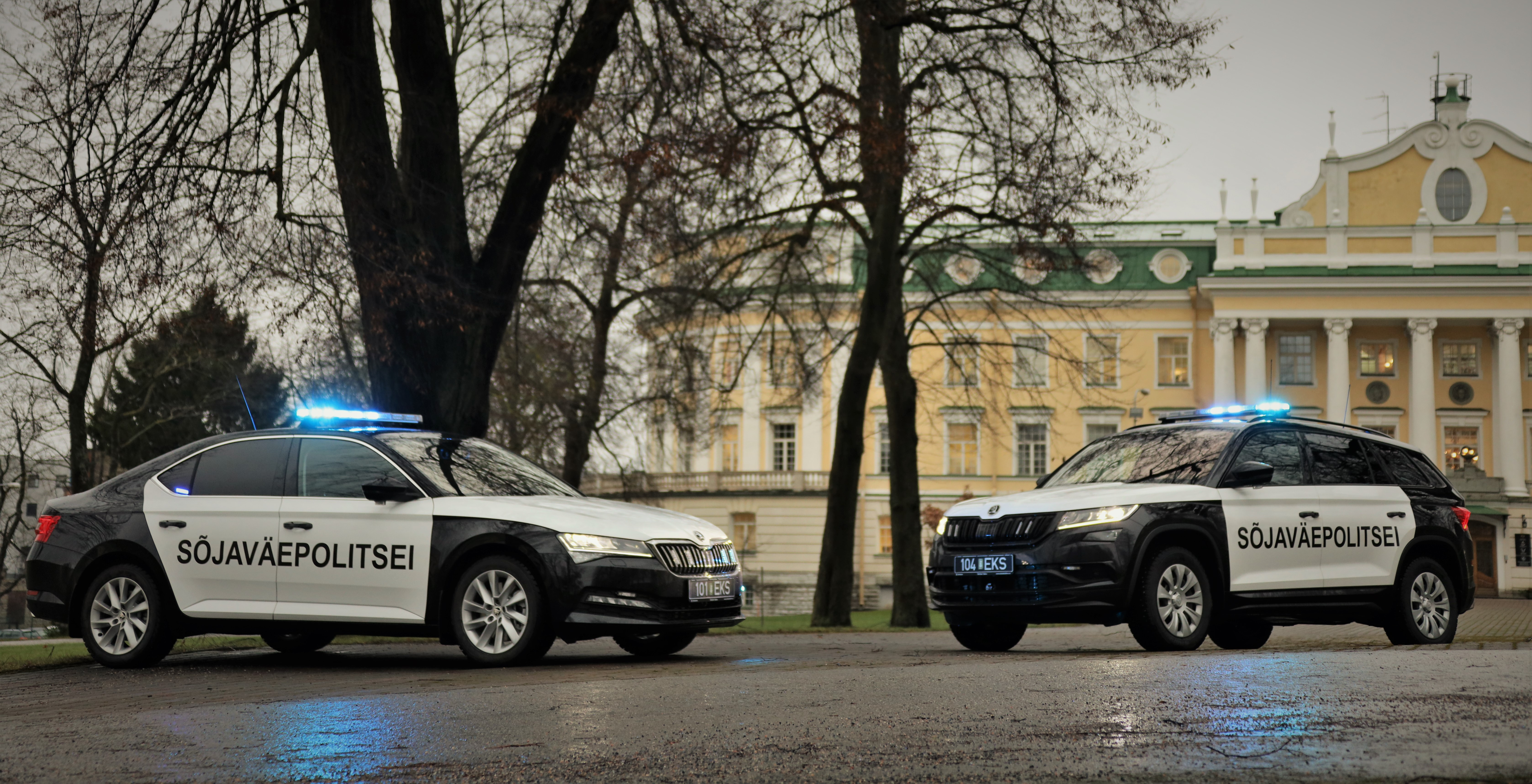
Military Police vehicles

Military Police is using Škodas as alarm vehicles and Mercedes G-Class as off-road vehicles.

- Škoda Superb
- Škoda Kodiaq
- Mercedes-Benz 290 GD

=== Armament ===
| Model | Image | Origin | Type | Caliber | Notes |
|---|---|---|---|---|---|
| Heckler & Koch USP | | Germany | Semi-automatic pistol | 9×19mm Parabellum | |
| Benelli M3T | | Italy | Pump action shotgun | 12 gauge | |
| LMT R-20 Rahe | | United States | Carbine and assault rifle | 5.56×45mm NATO | |
| Negev NG7 | | Israel | General-purpose machine gun | 7.62×51mm NATO | |
| Heckler & Koch MP5 A2 | | West Germany | Submachine gun | 9×19mm Parabellum | |

== List of commanders ==
- Aare Juht 1994–1995
- Eduard Kikas 1996–1998 (Acting)
- Eduard Kikas 1998–2017
- Meelis Sarapuu 2017–2025
- Toomas Väli 2025–present

== Military Police Guard Battalion ==
=== Guard Battalion ===
Guard Battalion emblem

Guard Battalion is a subdivision of Military Police, which main task is to conduct guard of honour at the presidential palace, ceremonial duties and prepare reserve military police units on the basis of conscripts.

== Symbols ==
=== Military Police flag ===
Police and Border Guard Board, as the closest partner of Military Police donated the flag in 13 December 2019 in the yard of Estonian Academy of Security Sciences.

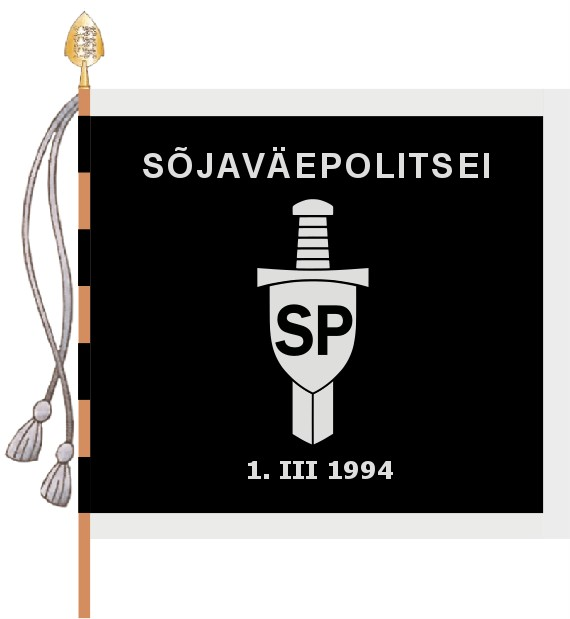
Military Police flag

=== Military Police emblem ===
The emblem of the Military Police depicts a sword on a black background with a shield with the letters SP (Sõjaväepolitsei) placed in front of it.

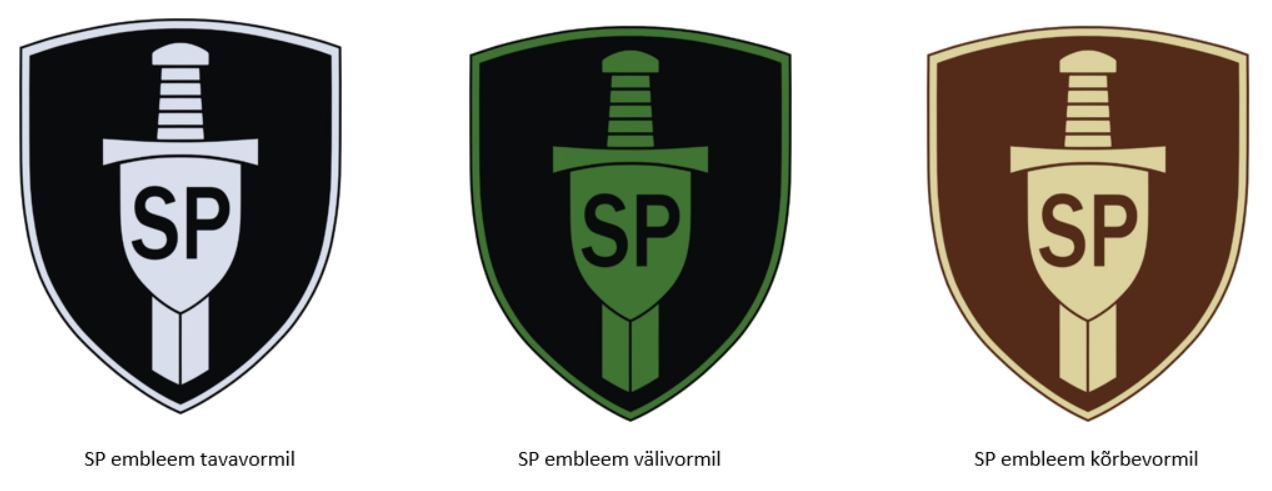
Three variants of MP emblems

=== Military Police badge ===
The badge of an active soldier who has completed military police training and serves in the military police is carrying SP and MP badge with silver glowing letters on a black background. Badge SP is used on performing tasks inside Estonia and MP badge is used outside of Estonia in foreign missions.

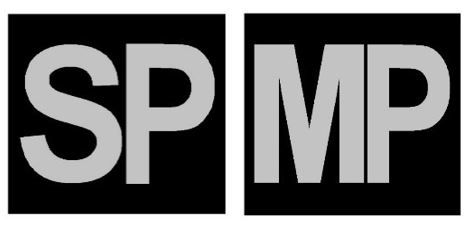
Military Policeman badge

== See also ==
- Estonian Defence Forces
- Guard Battalion
- Headquarters of the Estonian Defence Forces
