= Jaak Mee =

Estonian military commander

Jaak Mee (born 1970) is an Estonian military personnel. During a military career spanning more than three decades, he has served in command, operational planning, military intelligence, defence diplomacy and international advisory positions in the Estonian Defence Forces, Estonian Defence League, NATO and the European Union.

He has served as head of the Intelligence Department of the Headquarters of the Estonian Defence Forces, Chief of Staff of the Estonian Defence League Headquarters, Estonia’s defence attaché to Russia and Belarus, and Military Advisor to the Delegation of the European Union to Ukraine.

Military career

Mee began his service in the Estonian Defence Forces in 1992. He spent much of the first part of his military career with the Kuperjanov Infantry Battalion, where he served in various command and staff positions between 1992 and 2004.

He subsequently moved to the Estonian Land Forces Headquarters, where he served as a senior staff officer and later as Head of the Operations Department. From 2006 to 2009, he headed the Land Forces Headquarters’ Operations Department and was involved in operational planning, force development, training and the continued integration of the Estonian Land Forces into NATO structures.

From 2009 to 2012, Mee served as Head of the Intelligence Department (J2) of the Headquarters of the Estonian Defence Forces. In this position, he was responsible for military intelligence at the strategic level and for supporting senior military decision-making and operational planning.

NATO assignment

From 2012 to 2015, Mee served at NATO Allied Joint Force Command Brunssum (JFC Brunssum) in the Netherlands. He was a section chief within the headquarters’ intelligence division, serving in a multinational NATO operational-level headquarters.

His responsibilities included intelligence support to operational planning, information management and coordination within the NATO command structure.

Estonian Defence League.

In 2015, Mee joined the headquarters of the Estonian Defence League (Kaitseliit) as Head of the Operations and Planning Department.

On 1 August 2018, he became Chief of Staff of the Estonian Defence League Headquarters, succeeding Colonel Ilmar Tamm. As Chief of Staff, Mee was responsible for directing the work of the Defence League Headquarters and supporting the Commander of the Defence League in the development, training and readiness of the organisation.

He remained Chief of Staff until 2020.

Military Attache in Russia and Belarus.

From 2020 to 2022, Mee served as the Estonian Defence Attaché to the Russian Federation and Belarus.

The posting involved military diplomacy, defence and security reporting and liaison with Estonian authorities during a period of rapidly deteriorating relations between Russia and NATO countries.

His tenure as defence attaché coincided with the period immediately preceding Russia’s full-scale invasion of Ukraine in February 2022.

European Union

In 2022, Mee became Military Advisor to the Delegation of the European Union to Ukraine, based in Kyiv.

He served in this position from 2022 to 2026, covering the first four years of Russia’s full-scale invasion of Ukraine.

As Military Advisor, he provided military and defence advice to the Head of the EU Delegation and other senior European Union officials. His work included analysis of the military situation in Ukraine, engagement with the Ukrainian defence and security sector, and coordination on military assistance, training and defence-related cooperation between Ukraine and the European Union.

The position involved regular engagement with the Ministry of Defence of Ukraine, the Armed Forces of Ukraine, European Union institutions, EU member states, NATO representatives and other international military partners operating in support of Ukraine.

His tenure coincided with the establishment and expansion of major European military support initiatives for Ukraine, including the European Union Military Assistance Mission in support of Ukraine (EUMAM Ukraine), as well as increased EU involvement in Ukrainian defence reform, training and defence-industrial cooperation.

Operational experience

Mee has participated in international military operations and has extensive experience with NATO-led missions and multinational military cooperation.

In 2006, he deployed to Iraq as part of Operation Iraqi Freedom.

He has also travelled to Afghanistan on several occasions in connection with Estonia’s participation in NATO operations and international military cooperation.

His professional experience has included operational planning, intelligence, command and staff work, multinational headquarters, defence diplomacy and military-strategic advisory duties.

Military education

Mee has received military education and professional training in Estonia, Finland, the United States and at NATO institutions.

His military education includes:

- Maanpuolustusopisto, Finland
- Engineer Officer Basic Course, United States
- Baltic Defence College, Tartu, Estonia
- NATO Defense College, Rome, Italy

He graduated from the Estonian University of Life Sciences in 2004, specialising in entrepreneurship and economics.

Military rank

Mee was promoted to Major in 2006 and to Lieutenant Colonel in 2010.

In February 2016, he was promoted to the rank of Colonel by the President of Estonia.

Awards

In 1997 he was awarded with Order of the Cross of the Eagle's silver cross.

- Bronze Star Medal – United States
- Medal of Strengthening Defence Capability - Ukraine
- Lithuanian Land Forces Medal of Merit – Lithuania
- Estonian Defence Forces service decorations
- International operation and mission medals
