= Home Daughters =

Patriotic youth paramilitary organization in Estonia

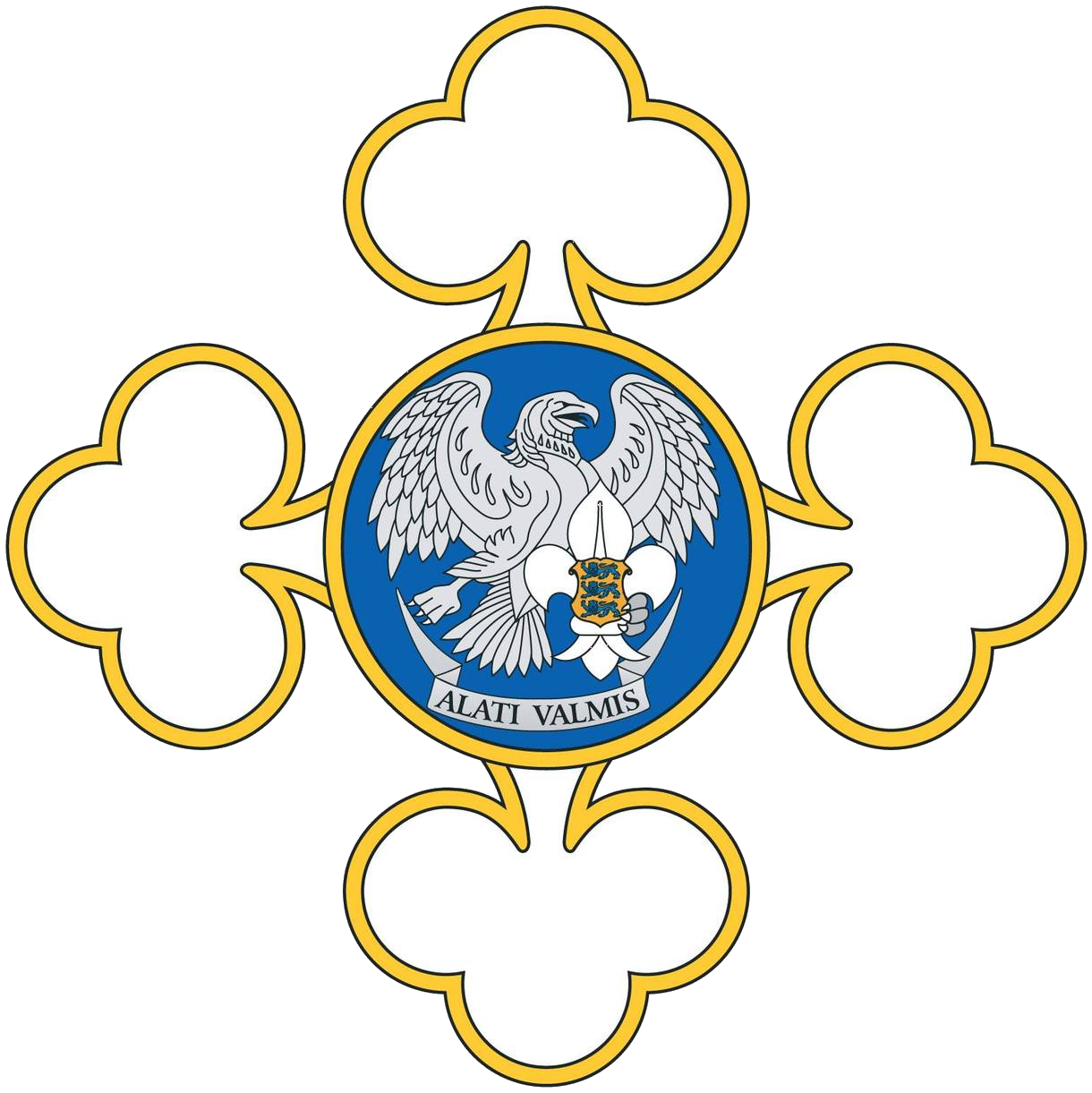
Logo

Home Daughters (Estonian: Kodutütred) is a patriotic youth paramilitary organization in Estonia, established in 1932 at Estonian Defence League. It is not a defence organisation.

In 1939, there were registered 19,601 Home Daughters.

In 1940, the organisation was eliminated due to the Soviet occupation of Estonia.

In 1991, the organisation was re-established after the restoration of Estonian independence.

In 2021, there were registered ~4500 Home Daughters.

Leaders (Estonian: peavanemad):

- 1933-1940 Salme Pruuden
- 1992-1999 Maret Lepik
- 1999-2002 Anne Eenpalu
- 2002-2018 Angelika Naris
- 2018-... Ave Proos

== See also ==
- Scouting and Guiding in Estonia
