= Estonian Guides Association =

Estonian national guiding organization

Eesti Gaidide Liit
- Estonian Guides Association
- Country: Estonia
- Founded: 1924/1999
- Membership: 761
- Affiliation: World Association of Girl Guides and Girl Scouts
- Website; Official website

Eesti Gaidide Liit (EGL, Estonian Guides Association) is the national Guiding organization of Estonia. In 1993 it was readmitted as a member of World Association of Girl Guides and Girl Scouts (WAGGGS).

== History ==
Anniversary badge of Estonian Girl Guides

Guiding in Estonia started in 1919, when the first Guide unit was formed in Tallinn. As elsewhere, the forerunner of Estonian Guiding was the Scout movement, and the first Guide units came into being as part of Scout units. The first independent district was formed in Tallinn in March 1920. In 1921, independent districts were formed in Tartu and Valga.

It was banned in 1940 after the Soviet occupation of Estonia. The organization Estonian Girl Guides in Exile was established in the autumn of 1949, and a change of statutes and name occurred in 1960.

The organization was founded through the merger of the Eesti Gaidide Malev (Estonian Girl Guide Association) with 250 members and the Eesti Gaidide Ühendus (Estonian Guide Association) with 525 members in 1999.

== Guide ideals ==
The Guide Motto is Ole Valmis, translated as Be Prepared in Estonian. The Estonian noun for a single Guide is gaid.

The Girl Guide emblem is set upon a banner of the flag of Estonia.

== See also ==
- Eesti Skautide Ühing

== Sources ==
- World Association of Girl Guides and Girl Scouts, World Bureau (2002), Trefoil Round the World. Eleventh Edition 1997. ISBN 0-900827-75-0
