= Peeter Läns =

Estonian military personnel (born 1959)

Peeter Läns (born in 1959) is an Estonian military personnel (Colonel).

He has been the head of Headquarters of the Estonian Defence Forces' Personnel Department.

In 1997 he was awarded with Order of the Cross of the Eagle, V class.
