= Ilmar Tamm =

Estonian major general (born 1972)

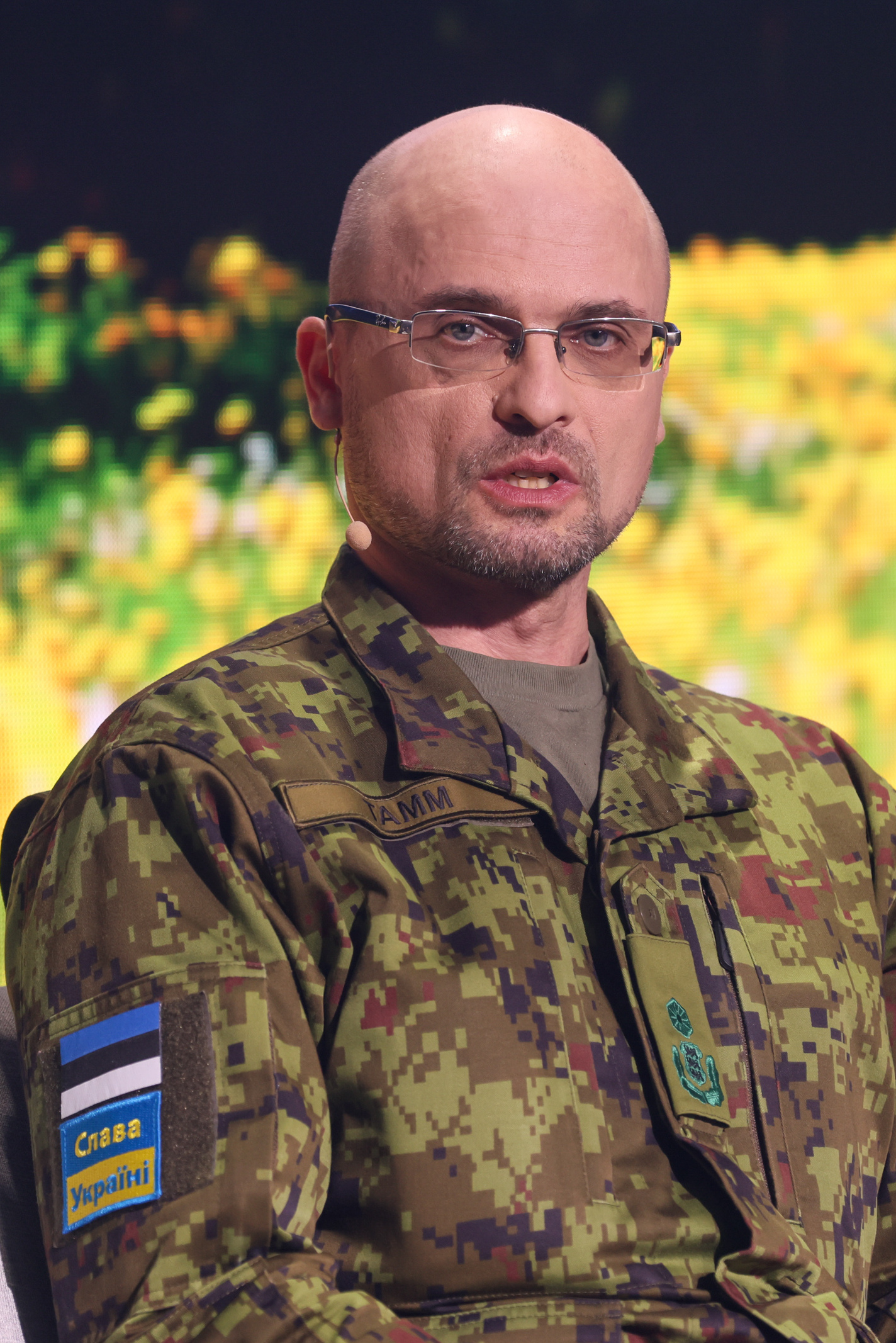
- Ilmar Tamm during a meeting in 2022
- Born: 4 May 1972 (age 54); Tartu, Estonia
- Education: Finnish National Defence University
- Military career
- Allegiance: Estonia
- Branch: Estonian Ground Forces; Estonian Defence League
- Service years: 1992–present
- Rank: Major general
- Commands: Estonian Defence League; Deputy Commander of the Estonian Defence Forces; Baltic Defence College; Chief of Staff, Estonian Defence League; NATO Cooperative Cyber Defence Centre of Excellence
- Awards: Order of the Cross of the Eagle, V Class

Ilmar Tamm (born 4 May 1972) is an Estonian Major General and has served as the commander of the Estonian Defence League since 2023.

In 1994, he graduated from the Finnish Military Academy.

From 2008 to 2012, he was the head of Cooperative Cyber Defence Centre of Excellence. From 2020 to 2023, he was the head of Baltic Defence College.

In 2004, he was awarded Order of the Cross of the Eagle, V Class.
