= Vahur Väljamäe =

Estonian military personnel (born 1968)

Vahur Väljamäe (born in 1968) is an Estonian military personnel.

In the 1990s, he was the Chief of Guard Battalion.

In 1997, he was awarded with Order of the Cross of the Eagle, IV class.
