= Artur Suzik =

Estonian military officer (born 1967)

Artur Suzik (born 29 November 1967) is an Estonian military personnel (Colonel).

Since 2013 he is the head of NATO Cooperative Cyber Defence Centre of Excellence's Estonian contingency.

In 2006 he was awarded with Order of the Cross of the Eagle, IV class.
