= Margus Kuul =

Estonian military personnel (born 1979)

Margus Kuul (born 6 July 1979) is an Estonian military personnel (Lieutenant Colonel).

Since 2019, he is the commander of Estonian Special Operations Force.

In 2009, he was awarded by the Order of the Cross of the Eagle, V Class.
