= Eero Rebo =

Estonian military personnel

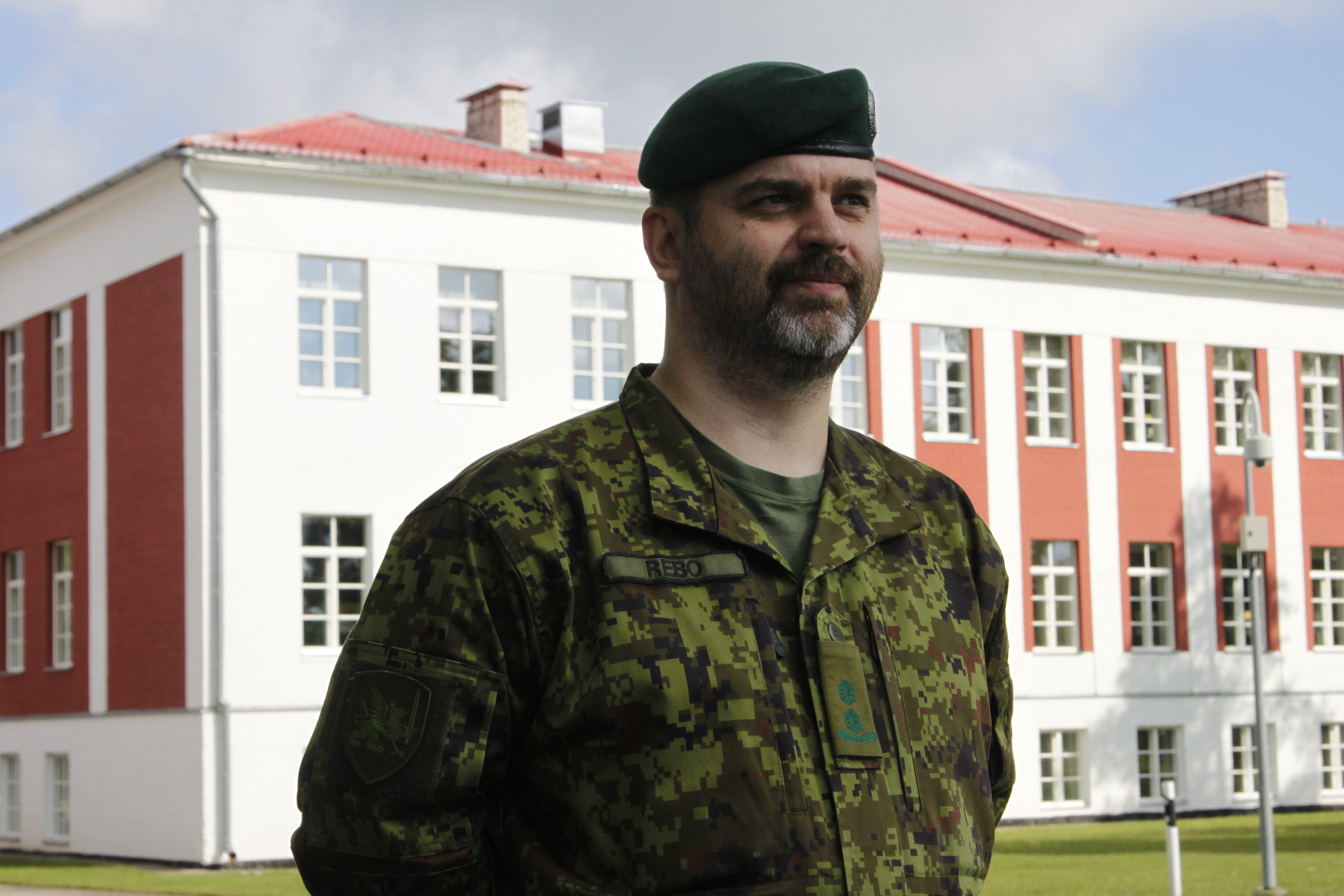
Eero Rebo

Eero Rebo (born 19 December 1974, in Abja-Paluoja) is an Estonian Land Forces colonel.

From 2004 to 2007 he was the commander of Kuperjanov Infantry Battalion.

From 2015 to 2019 he was the commander of 2nd Infantry Brigade.

From 2020 to 2025 he was the head of the headquarters of Estonian Defence League (Estonian: Kaitseliidu peastaap).
