= Risto Lumi =

Estonian lieutenant colonel

Risto Lumi (born 17 May 1971 in Tallinn) is an Estonian military personnel (Lieutenant Colonel).

From 2006–2008 he was the commander of Headquarters of the Estonian Defence Forces' intelligence department. From 2008-2011 he was Estonian Military Attaché in Georgia.

In 2005 he was awarded with Order of the Cross of the Eagle, V class.
