= Vahur Murulaid =

Estonian military personnel

Vahur Murulaid (born 29 November 1967) is an Estonian military personnel (Lieutenant Colonel).

2007–2011, he was the head and deputy head of Estonian Military Academy.

In 2005, he was awarded with Order of the Cross of the Eagle, V class.
