= Young Eagles (Estonian youth organisation) =

Patriotic youth organization based in Estonia

- Noored Kotkad
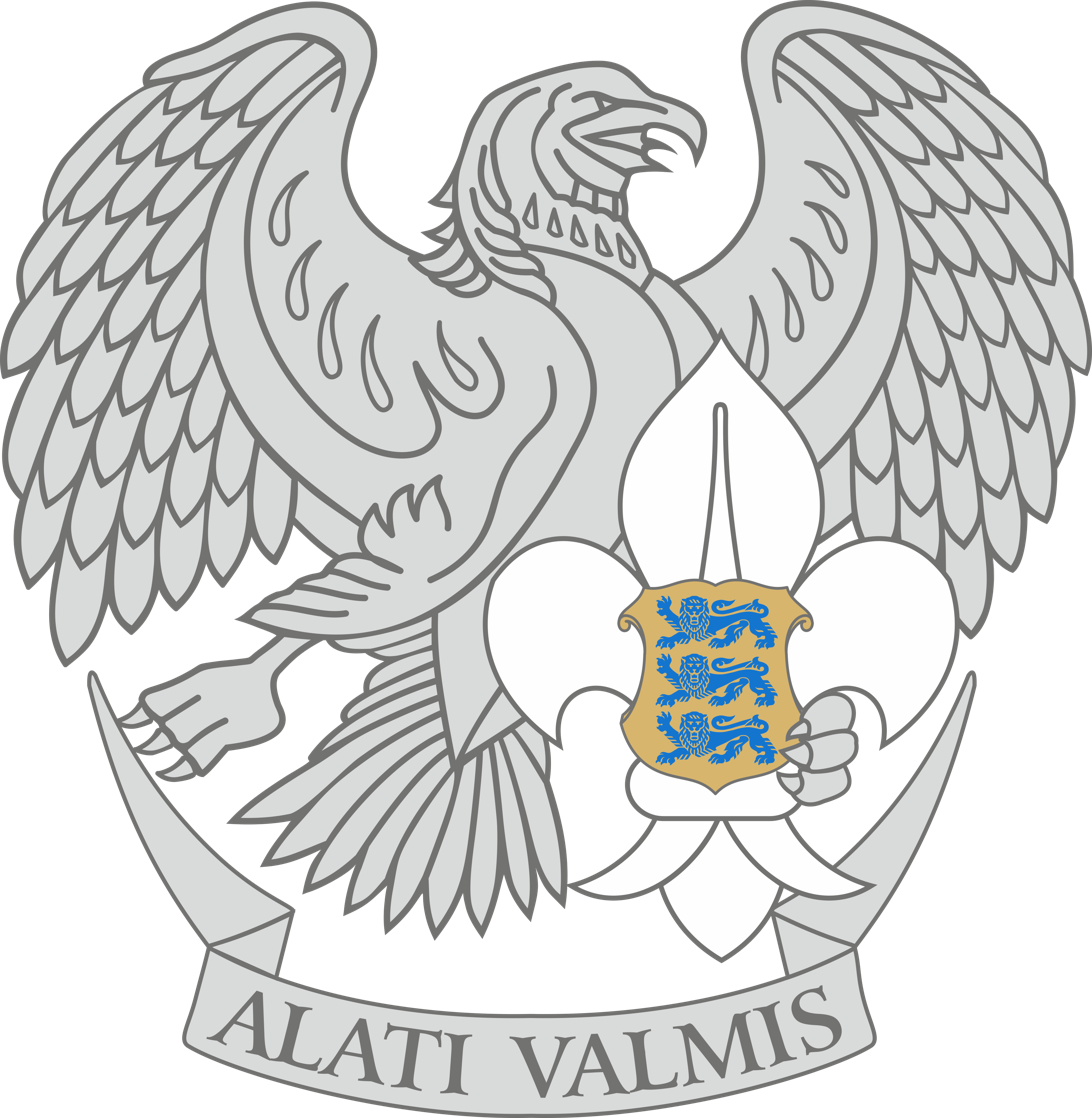
- Logo
- Founded: May 30, 1930; August 12, 1989 (re-establishment)
- Country: Estonia
- Type: Youth cadet program
- Size: 4,000
- Headquarters: Tallinn
- Website: https://nooredkotkad.ee/

Young Eagles of Estonia (Estonian: Noored Kotkad) is a patriotic youth paramilitary organization in Estonia, established in 1930. It is not a defence organisation.

== History ==
In 1928, the Council of Elders, a committee within the Kaitseliit (Estonian Defence League), decided to invite the youth organization Noored Kotkad to cooperate and affiliate with it as a subsidiary organization. The youth organization was founded on May 30, 1930.

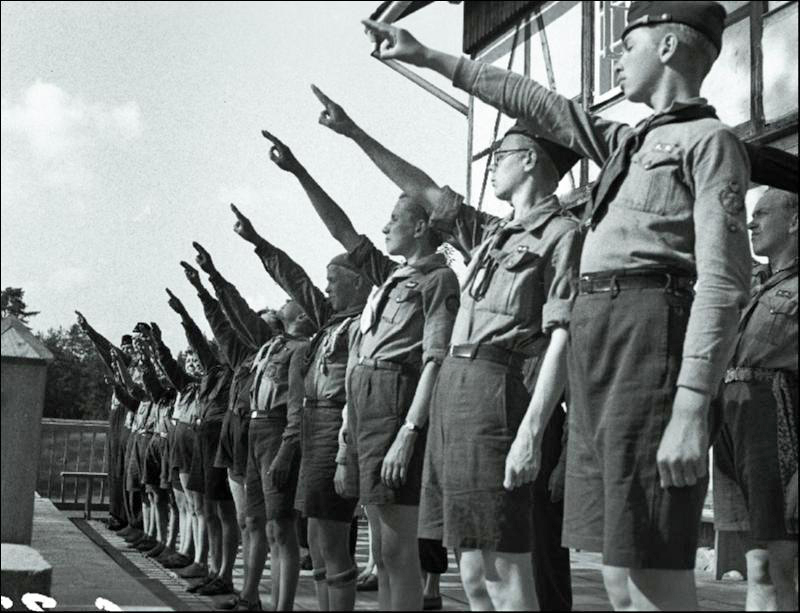
Flag salute by Young Eagles at "Eagle's home" summer camp, Võru-Kubija, Estonia, 1939

Noored Kotkad was banned after the occupation of the country by the Soviet Union in 1940. From 1941 onwards, some of them actively participated in the partisan fighting (“Forest Brothers”) against the Red Army and were later integrated into the structures of the Omakaitse (self-defense). Members of the “Omakaitse thugs” were also involved in the Holocaust and in “extermination campaigns” against groups considered “enemies” of the Third Reich – communists, Soviet activists, Jews, and Roma.

Even before Estonia regained its independence, the organization was reestablished on August 12, 1989.

== Organisation and Membership ==
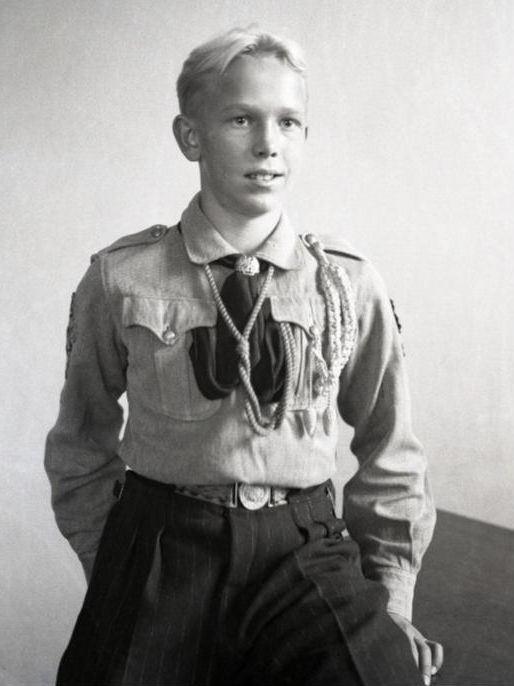
A member of the Young Eagles in uniform in 1939

Although sponsored by the Estonian Defence League and having many members wearing military camouflage uniforms, the Young Eagles is not a defence organisation (or a part of the Estonian military). However many of the organization's adult leaders have a military background and members do participate with the volunteer or regular forces on some occasions.

Young Eagles accepts (drugs-, smoking- and alcohol free) boys from 7 to 19 years of age and adult leaders from 18 years. There are total about 4,000 members in regional units throughout the country. The 15 battalion-size regional units (malev) consist of separate platoons and sometimes company-sized subunits (malevkond). Platoons are mostly called by the name of the place in which they are based; those attached to schools may use the name of the school.

The headquarters of the organisation is located in Tallinn Toompea street 8.

== Activities ==
The objective of the organisation is to raise young people as good citizens with healthy bodies and minds. Traditional scouting method is used sometimes. Activities include:

- formation drills,
- first aid,
- orienteering,
- shooting firearms,
- airsoft and field skills,
- hiking

The organization also participates in numerous events, camps and competitions. The most well known but also the most difficult is the Mini-Erna reconnaissance competition (30–50 km).

Some junior and adult members also undergo leadership training.

== See also ==
- Estonian Defence League
- Young Riflemen
- Army Cadet Force
