= Estonian Defence League =

Paramilitary branch of Estonia's military

- Kaitseliit
- Active: 1918–1940; 1990–present
- Country: Estonia
- Type: Light infantry Home guard
- Size: Defence League: 18,000 (2024); Affiliate organizations: 11,000 (2024)
- Garrison/HQ: Tallinn
- Motto: Eesti eest surmani! ("For Estonia until death!")
- Anniversaries: 11 November (formed); 17 February (restored)
- Engagements: Estonian War of Independence
- Website: www.kaitseliit.ee/en

Commanders
- Commander: Major general Ilmar Tamm
- Chief of Staff: Colonel Eero Rebo

Insignia
- Flag

The Estonian Defence League (Estonian: Kaitseliit, 'Defence League') is a voluntary national defence organization of the Republic of Estonia, under management of the Ministry of Defence. Its aim is to guarantee the preservation of the independence and sovereignty of the state, the integrity of its land area and its constitutional order.

The Defence League possesses arms and engages in military exercises, fulfilling the tasks given to it by the law. The organization is divided into 4 Territorial Defence Districts that consist of 15 Defence League regional units, called malevs, whose areas of responsibility mostly coincide with the borders of Estonian counties.

== Mission ==
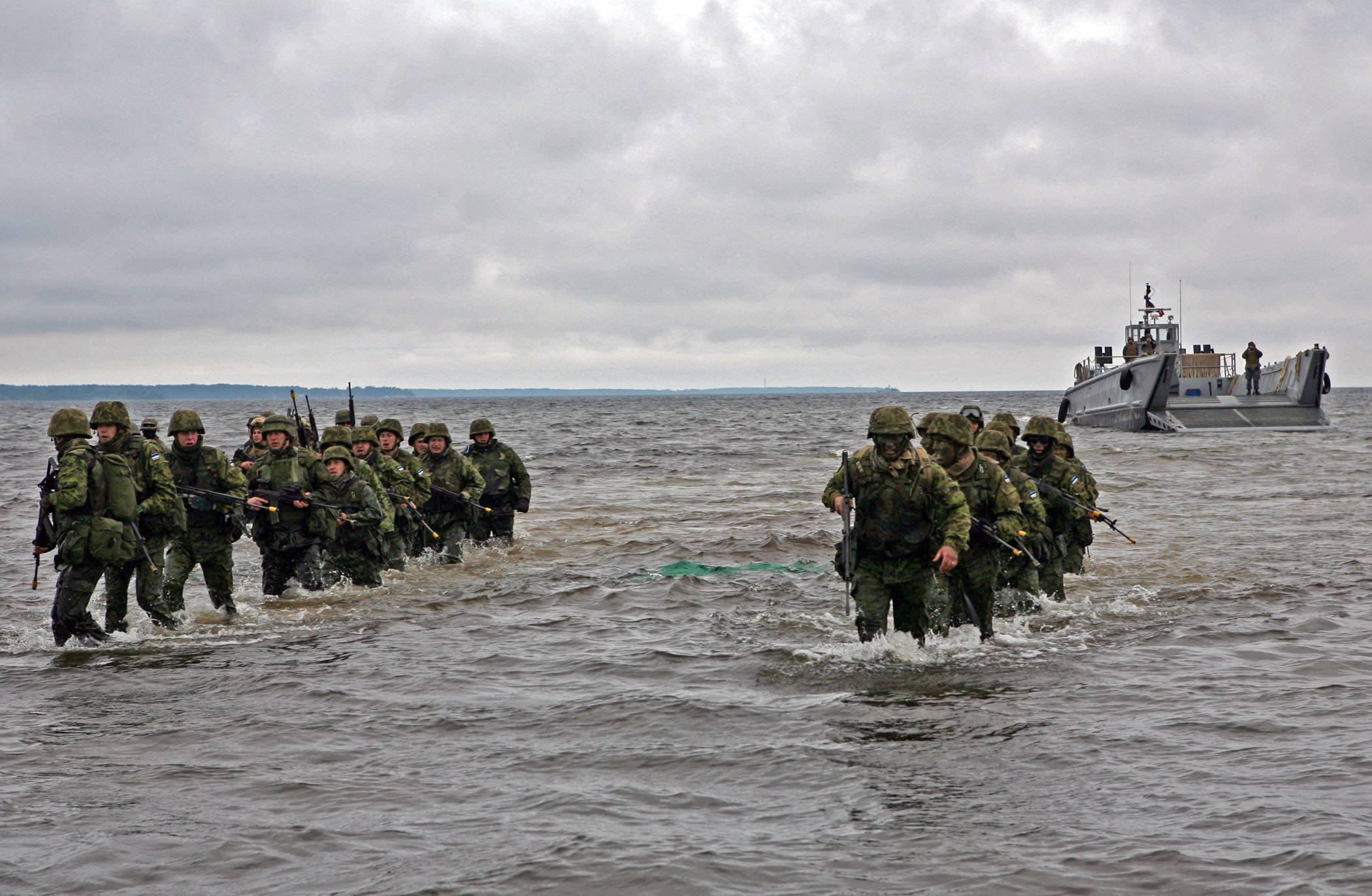
Defence League troops in joint exercise with US marines in 2010

The Defence League is a voluntary military national defence organisation, which acts in the area of government of the Ministry of Defence. The Defence League possesses arms and engages in military exercises. The main goal of the Defence League is, on the basis of the citizens’ free will and initiative, to enhance the readiness of the nation to defend its independence and its constitutional order, including in the event of military threat.

The Defence League plays an important role in supporting the civil structures. Its members aid in putting out wildfires, volunteer as assistant police members, and ensure safety at various events. Units, consisting of voluntary members of the Defence League, also participate in international peace support operations such as in the Balkan states. The Defence League and its affiliated organisations have positive relations with partner organisations in the Nordic countries, the United States, and the United Kingdom.

== History ==
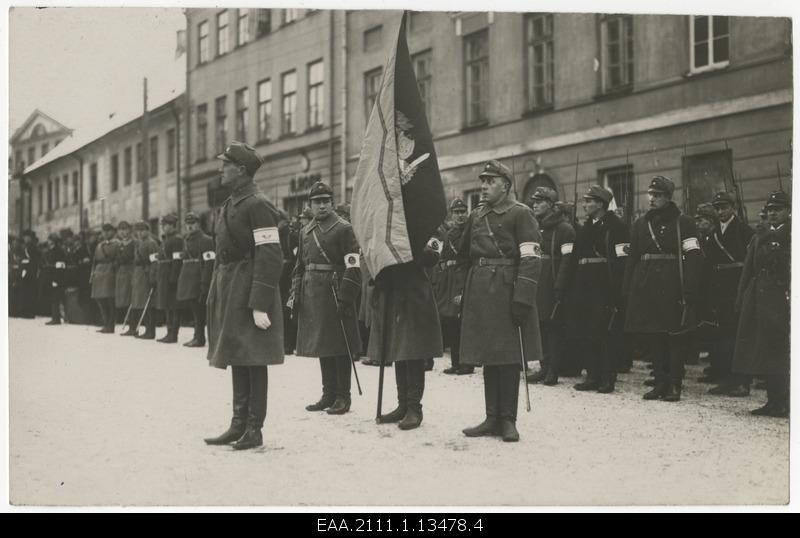
Estonian Defence League troops at the parade in Tartu (1925)

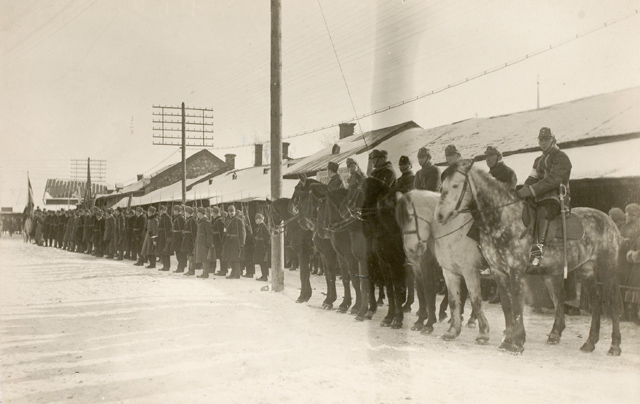
Estonian Defence League troops at the parade during interwar period

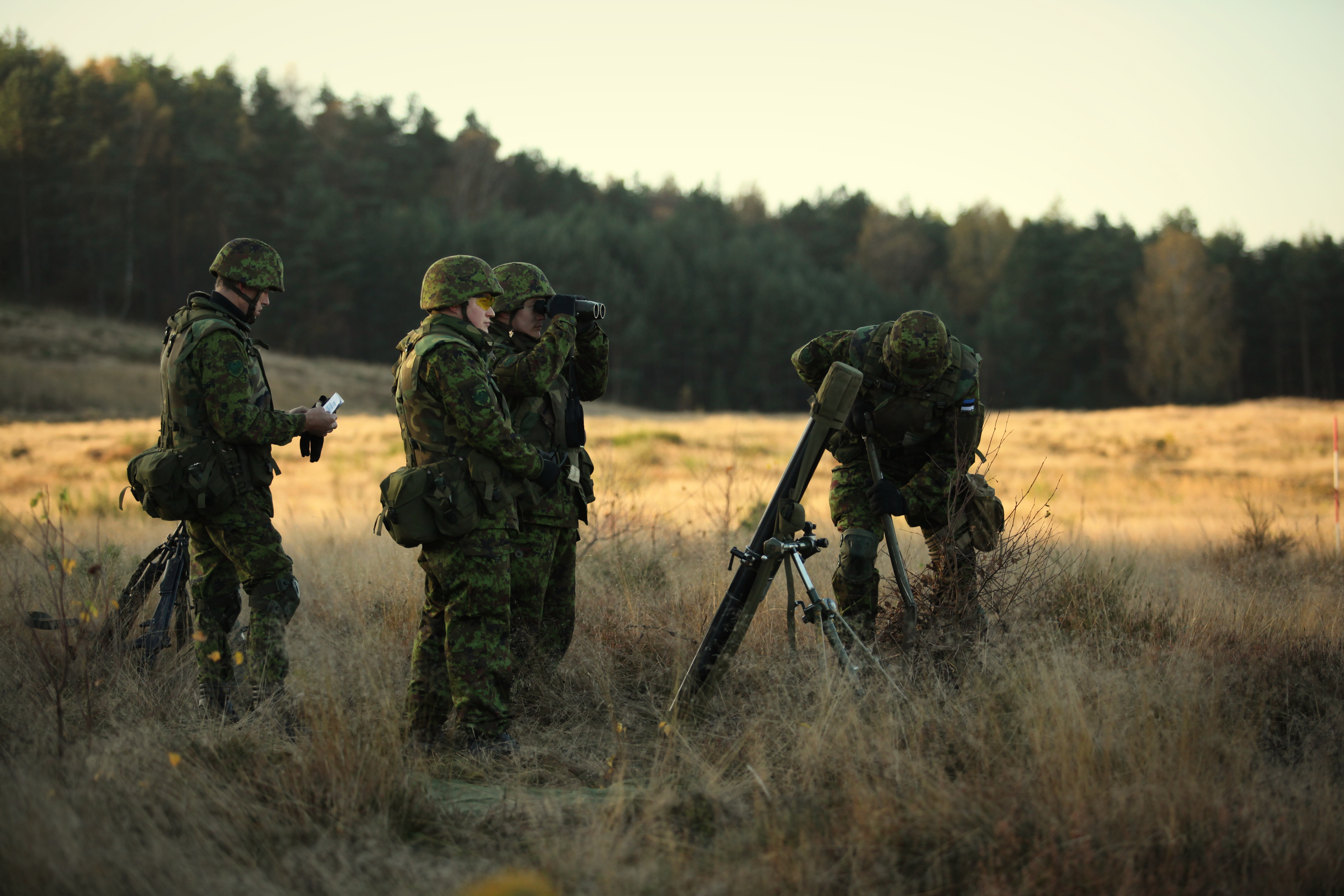
Estonian Defence League troops manning a mortar

- 1918 – The Estonian Defence League was preceded by Estonia's first armed home defence organisation, the Omakaitse (Citizens' Defence Organisation, German Bürgerwehr) against the public disorder accompanying the Russian Revolution.
- 1918 – On 11 November the Citizens' Defence Organisation was renamed the Estonian Defence League which performed the tasks of a national guard in the War of Independence.
- 1924 – The attempted Communist coup on December 1 was opposed by the Defence League. Development of the Defence League for the performance of tasks of national defence was started.
- 1925 – In October the Estonian Defence League magazine "Kaitse Kodu!" ("Defend Your Home!") was founded.
- 1926 – On 19–20 June the first Estonian Defence League Festival took place in Tallinn, to be followed by six more such events held before 1940.
- 1927 – To develop the Defence League and give it a family dimension, the Commander of the Defence League approved the temporary statutes of the Women's Home Defence.
- 1928 – The Body of Elders decided to invite the boy scout organisation the Young Eagles to join the Defence League.
- 1931 – The Government of the Republic approved the Statutes of the Defence League which have remained in force until the present day.
- 1932 – The Girl Scout organisation Home Daughters was established at the Women's Home Defence.
- 1934 – To regulate the life and work of the organisation, House Rules of the Defence League were adopted.
- 1940 – Soviet Union invaded Estonia on 17 June. Estonian government was forced to sign a deal that demanded collection of all the weapons, including personal ones, from the Defence League members within 48 hours. In protest many members deliberately damaged their weapons before returning them. Hundreds of weapons were hidden. On 24 June all 43,600 members were released from their vowed obligations. On 29 June, all the assets and money of the Defence League were transferred to the ownership of the Communist Party of Estonia, formally ending the existence of the Defence League.
- 1974 – Defence League in exile was founded by Estonian Minister of War in exile Avdy Andresson in the United States
- 1990 – The Defence League was re-founded on 17 February at Järvakandi on popular initiative in order to defend Estonia's independent statehood.
- 1991 – On 4 September the Presidium of the Supreme Council of the Republic of Estonia reinstated the rights of the Defence League as a legal organization, days after its personnel were deployed as the Soviet Airborne Troops occupied the Tallinn TV Tower but owing to EDL personnel deployed to the signal rooms, did not disrupt the radio broadcasts.
- 1992 – On 28 April the Defence League was included in the Defence Forces as a national defence organisation.

The Estonian Defence League did not completely cease to exist after being closed down during the Soviet occupation in summer 1940. Its members hid some of the weapons but it was done on their own initiative and only in a few locations. They maintained communication, common listening to foreign radio stations was organised as well as discussions of world affairs and future prospects.

After the June deportation in 1941 and the breakout of war between Germany and the Soviet Union, the former members of the Defence League and other civilians formed partisan groups in the woods called forest brothers. As clashes with the retreating Soviet 8th Army, destruction battalions and NKVD escalated into the Summer War, the partisan groups formed themselves into Omakaitse of rural municipalities and regions. The formation of countywide structures began right after the arrival of the German 18th Army. The first such organisation was created on 3 July 1941 in the town of Kilingi-Nõmme. It included the units of Omakaitse and forest brothers of rural municipalities. After the arrival of the 18th Army, the Omakaitse were subordinated to local Wehrmacht field commanders. This happened in Pärnu on 10 July, in Tartu on 11 July, in Valga on 12 July and in Võru on 14 July.

In 1999, the Estonian Parliament adopted the EDL Law, which provided the position of the Kaitseliit in society and national defence and also described its main tasks, structure, legal basis for operations and control and co-operation with the Defence Forces, Police, and other state organizations.

== Organization ==
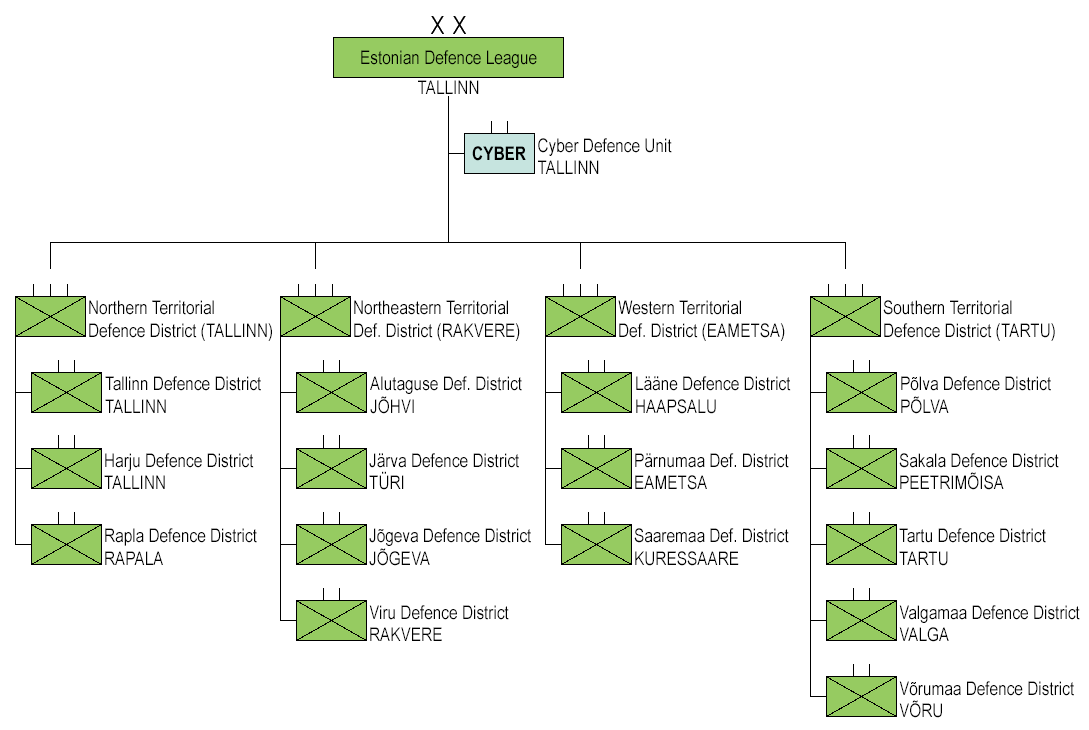
Estonian Defence League organization as of April 2026 (click to enlarge)

The organisation is divided into 4 Territorial Defence Districts (maakaitseringkond) that consist of 15 Defence League regional units (malev) whose areas of responsibility mostly coincide with the borders of Estonia's counties.

In case of mobilization, each of the districts will form a battalion sized maneuver unit.

- Northern Territorial Defence District: Tallinn, Harju and Rapla malevs
- Northeastern Territorial Defence District: Alutaguse, Viru, Jõgeva and Järva malevs
- Southern Territorial Defence District: Põlva, Sakala, Tartu, Valgamaa and Võrumaa malevs
- Western Territorial Defence District: Pärnumaa, Lääne and Saaremaa malevs

Today, the Defence League has over 15,000 reservists. The affiliated organisations of the Defence League combine more than 25,000 volunteers, in all, and include the Estonian Defence League's women's corps (Naiskodukaitse), the Estonian Defence League's boys’ corps (Noored Kotkad), and the Estonian Defence League's girls’ corps (Kodutütred).

=== Affiliated organisations ===
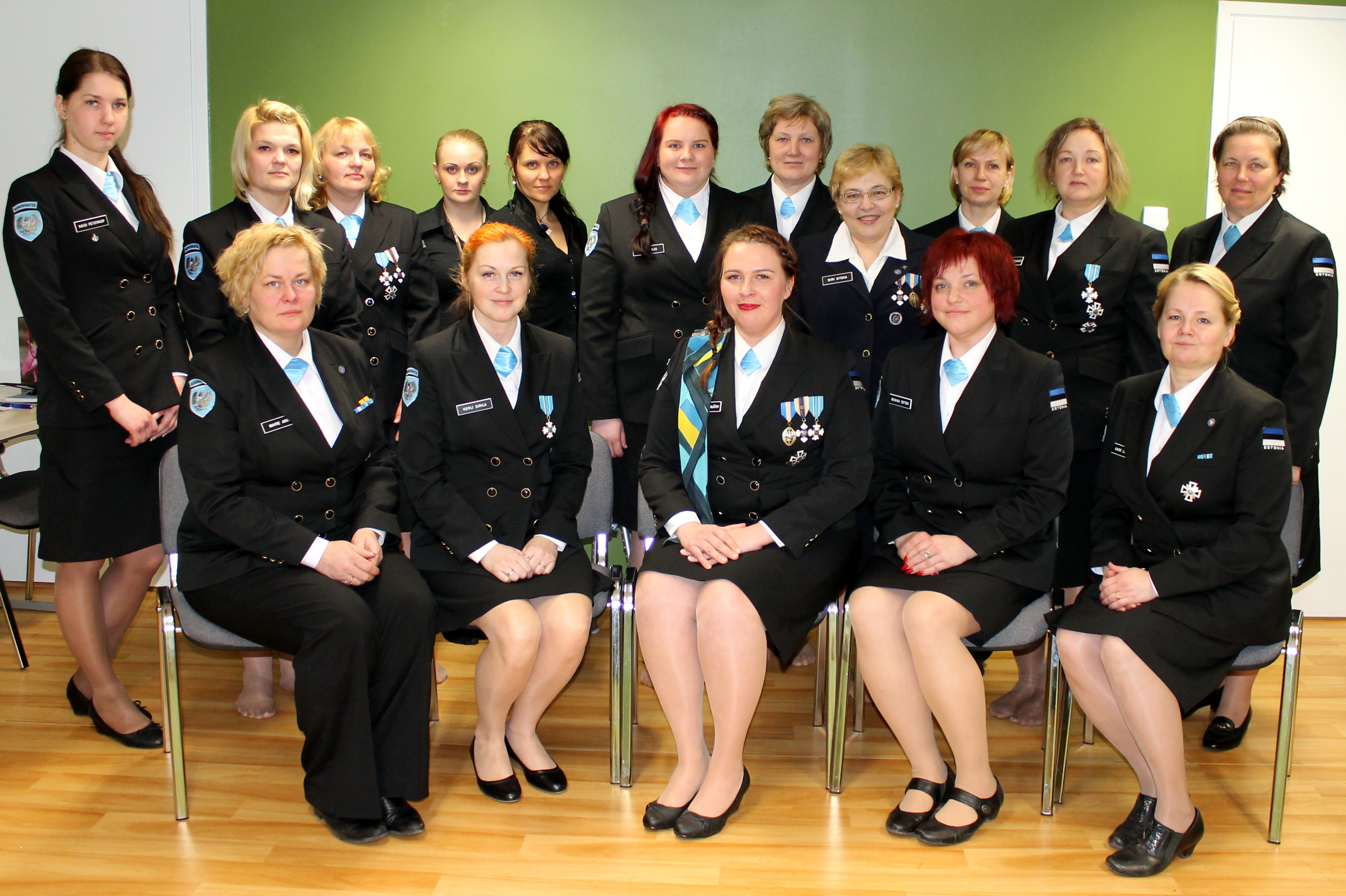
Women's Corps members from Järva County

Women's Voluntary Defence Organization (WVDO)

WVDO – Women's Home Protection (Estonian: Naiskodukaitse (NKK)) is an organisation within Kaitseliit. Every member of WVDO has a function/task in a case of crises (civilian or armed)

1. Military defence - every member has the option to contribute in a military unit as a combatant
2. Comprehensive national defence - evacuation units civil defence affairs (courses, app), We Salute! campaign to support veterans, youth work, co-operation with MoI (Rescue Board, Police and Border Guard, Emergency Response Centre, etc.)
3. Community member - Member of WVDO with skills and knowledge of basic training is able to cope in all situations and different crises. Willing to take initiative and responsibility in all stages of crises. Empowerment of women!

Defence League's girls’ corps – "Home Daughters"

The Defence League's girls’ corps – Kodutütred was established to increase patriotic feelings and readiness to defend the independence of Estonia among young girls; to enhance the love for home and fatherland; to encourage respect for the Estonian language and ways of thinking; to be honest, enterprising, responsible, and capable of decision-making; to respect nature; and to respect one's parents and others.

Defence League's boys’ corps – "Young Eagles"

The Defence League's boys’ corps is the Noored Kotkad. The objective of the organisation is to raise young people as good citizens with healthy bodies and minds. In addition to numerous activities, such as parachute jumping, flying gliders, orienteering, shooting weapons, etc., the boys’ corps also participates in numerous events, the most popular but also the most difficult being the Mini-Erna 35 km reconnaissance competition.

== Culture ==
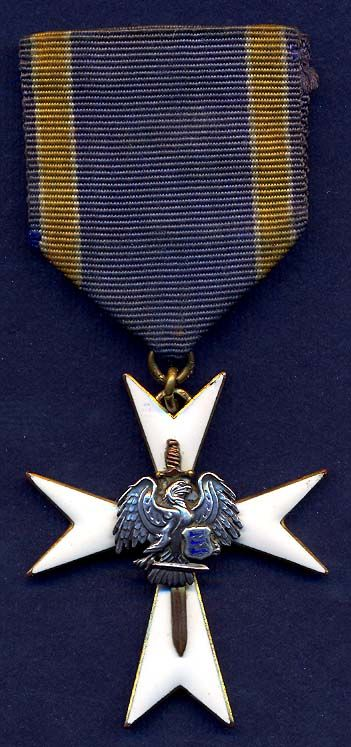
White Cross of Defence League medal

The Estonian Victory Day (1919) has been celebrated until WWII with military parades, organized by the Kaitseliit. Since 2000, Victory Day parades have been organized by Kaitseliit again every June 23. The 2015 parade also saw a rising number of military contingents from NATO countries take part: Latvia, the United States, Finland, Poland and Sweden, while 2016, aside from the US and Latvian troops also featured new contingents from Lithuania and Denmark.

In 2006, the first Fleet Review in Estonian history was conducted by Kaitseliit in June in Saaremaa.

In 2016, the Sakala subdivision of Estonian Defence League formed the first Estonian military pipe band and their first performance was during the yearly Victory Day parade the same year. Band uses 4 sets of drums and 12 special sets of "war pipes" made by Andres Taul. Idea for such a unit originally came from President Lennart Meri in 2001 whilst he was visiting the Viljandi Folk Music Festival. The idea was later revived by President Toomas Hendrik Ilves in 2010 and Ando Kiviberg, notable local piper and head of Viljandi's folk festival, was assigned to form the band. According to Kiviberg one of the goals of the band is also to promote bagpipes amongst males, as Estonia is lacking male pipers.

== Personnel ==
=== Leadership ===
The Commander of Defence League (Estonian: Kaitseliidu ülem) is the highest-ranking officer of the Defence League; though he may not be the senior officer by time in grade. The Commander has the responsibility to man, train, equip and develop the organization. He does not serve as a direct battlefield commander. The Commander is a member and head of the Chief of Staff which is the main organizational tool of the Commander. The Commander is appointed by the Commander of the Defence Forces or by the Supreme Commander in Chief of the Defence Forces. The current Commandant is major general Ilmar Tamm, who assumed the position in 2023. As of 2020, Colonel Eero Rebo is the Defence League Chief of Staff.

=== Ranks and insignia ===
NATO code	OF-10	OF-9	OF-8	OF-7	OF-6	OF-5	OF-4	OF-3	OF-2	OF-1
Estonian Land Forces
Estonian Land Forces		Kindral	Kindralleitnant	Kindralmajor	Brigaadikindral	Kolonel	Kolonelleitnant	Major	Kapten	Leitnant	Nooremleitnant	Lipnik
Estonian: Lühend		kin	kin-ltn	kin-mjr	brig-kin	kol	kol-ltn	mjr	kpt	ltn	n-ltn	lpn
English: Ranks		General	Lieutenant General	Major General	Brigadier General	Colonel	Lieutenant Colonel	Major	Captain	First Lieutenant	Second Lieutenant	Ensign

NATO code	OR-9		OR-8	OR-7	OR-6	OR-5	OR-4		OR-3	OR-2	OR-1
Estonian Land Forces
Estonian Land Forces	Ülemveebel	Staabiveebel	Vanemveebel	Veebel	Nooremveebel	Vanemseersant	Seersant	Nooremseersant		Kapral	Reamees
Estonian: Lühend	ü-vbl	st-vbl	v-vbl	vbl	n-vbl	v-srs	srs	n-srs		kpr	rms
English: Ranks	Command Sergeant Major	Sergeant Major	Master Sergeant	Sergeant First Class	Staff Sergeant	Sergeant (Senior)	Sergeant	Sergeant (Junior)		Corporal	Private

Defence League soldier wearing ESTDCU

=== Uniforms ===
Standard uniforms of the Estonian Defence Forces are the ESTDCU issued to Defence League personnel. On some festive occasions (such as parades), white armbands with the insignia of the given territorial unit are worn. Civilian uniforms are worn by the women's division during parades and ceremonies.

Armbands have also previously been worn on civilian clothing to distinguish members of the Defence League from civilians during periods when Defence League units did not have sufficient inventories to supply every member with a uniform (during World War I; and in the beginning of the 1990s).

== Equipment ==
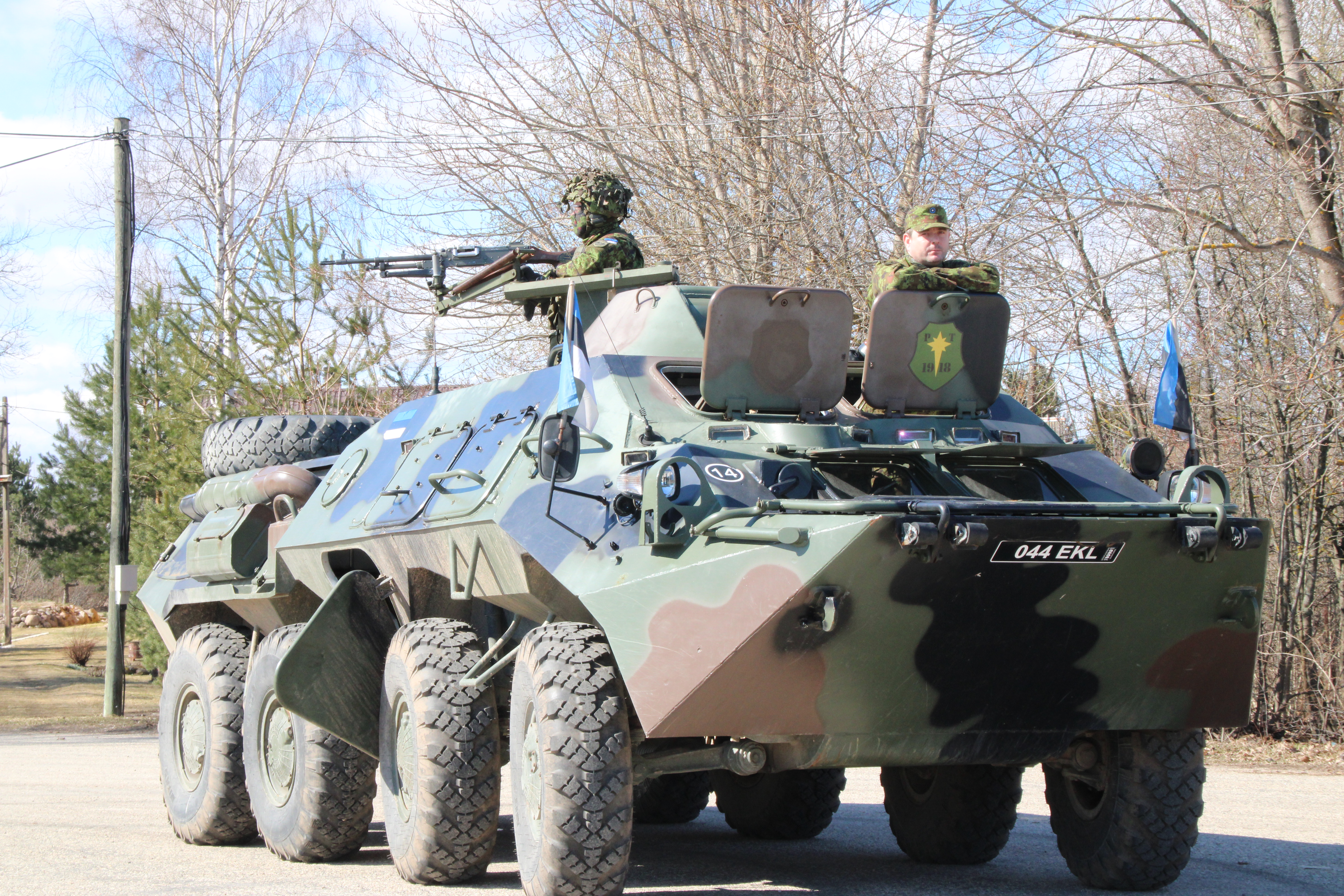
Defence League's BTR-80 armoured personnel carrier

Estonian Defence League personnel behind a Ksp 58

The basic infantry weapon of the Defence League is the 5.56mm LMT R-20 Rahe, but the majority of the memberbase is equipped with the 7.62mm G3 rifle and its variants. The G3-based rifles are being phased out in favour of the R-20 Rahe in Territorial Defence (Maakaitse) maneuver units while backline units will retain the G3.

Suppressive fire is provided by the Ksp 58, MG3 machine guns and M2 Browning heavy machine guns. Squad level anti-tank capabilities are provided with 84mm Carl Gustav recoilless rifles. In addition, indirect fire is provided by 81mm and 120mm mortars on battlegroup level.

Defence League battlegroups also include dedicated anti-tank units equipped with 90mm Pvpj 1110 anti-tank guns and FGM-148 Javelin ATGMs. The Defence League utilizes a variety of tactical transport vehicles and a small number of BTR-80 armoured personnel carriers.

== See also ==
- Territorial Forces (Finland)
- Home Guard (Sweden)
- Latvian National Guard
- Lithuanian National Defence Volunteer Forces
- Lithuanian Riflemen's Union
