= Patarei Prison =

Prison in Tallinn, Estonia

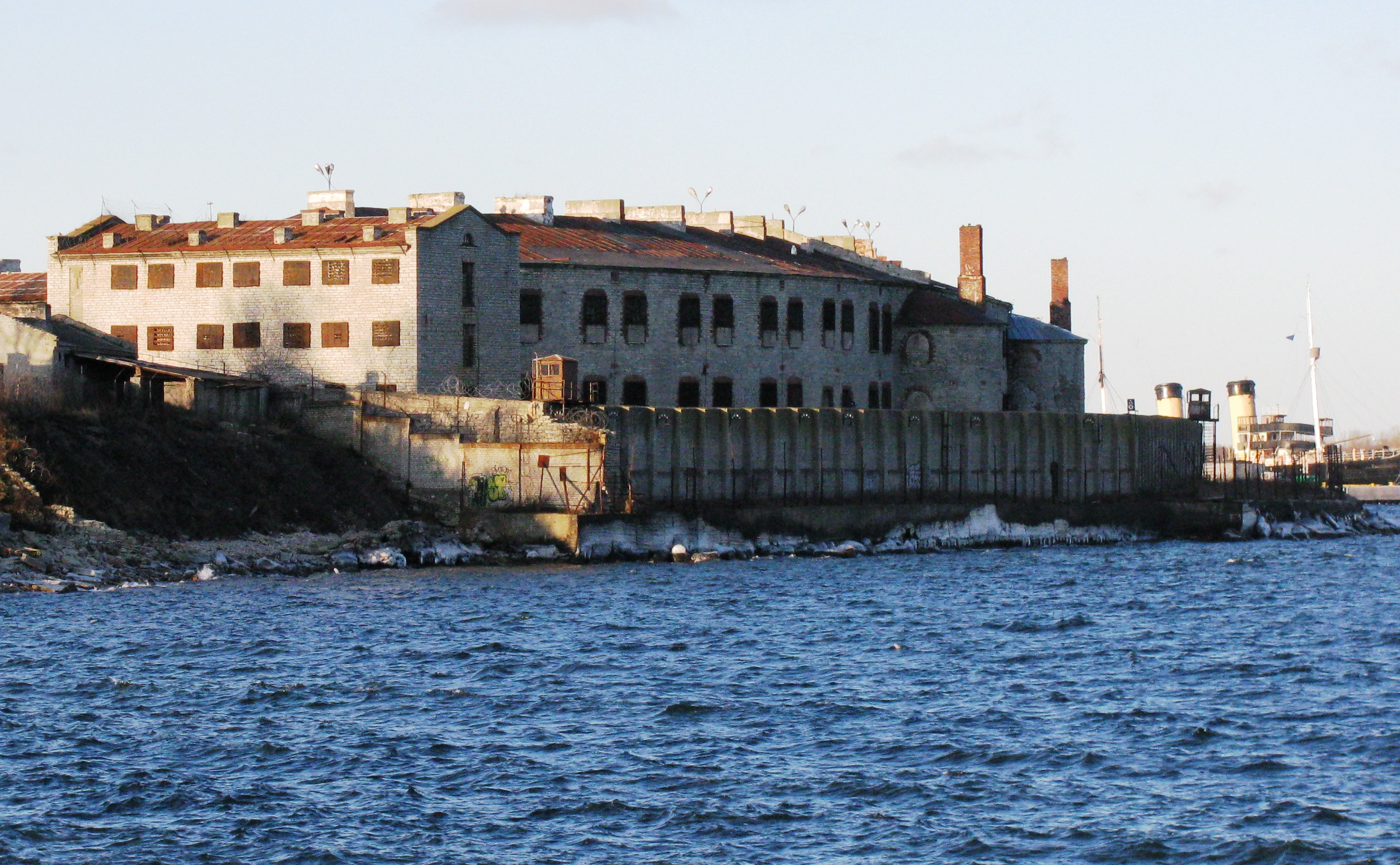
- Patarei Prison
- Interactive map of Patarei Prison
- Location: 59°27′01″N 24°44′30″E

Patarei Prison (Estonian: Patarei vangla), also known as Patarei Sea Fortress and Tallinn Central Prison (Tallinna Keskvangla), commonly known as The Battery (Patarei), is a building complex in Kalamaja district of Tallinn, Estonia. The premises cover approximately four hectares of a former sea fortress and prison, located on the shore of Tallinn Bay.

The fort was built from 1830–1837 as part of the fortifications for the tsarist Russian state. The building order was given by emperor Nicholas I. In 1864, Tallinn was removed from Russian Empire’s list of fortresses due to Russia’s defeat in the Crimean War, and the fort was converted into barracks.

The Republic of Estonia, which declared independence in 1918, reconstructed it as a prison after World War I. In 1919, the fort's main function became a prison, lasting until 2005.

For Estonians, Patarei is one of the most prominent symbols of Soviet and Nazi political terror.

In 2018, the Estonian Institute of Historical Memory launched preparations to establish a museum of crimes of communism and an accompanying international research centre in Tallinn. The museum is planned to an approximately 5,000 square meter area in the eastern part of the building and is scheduled to open in 2027.

== History ==
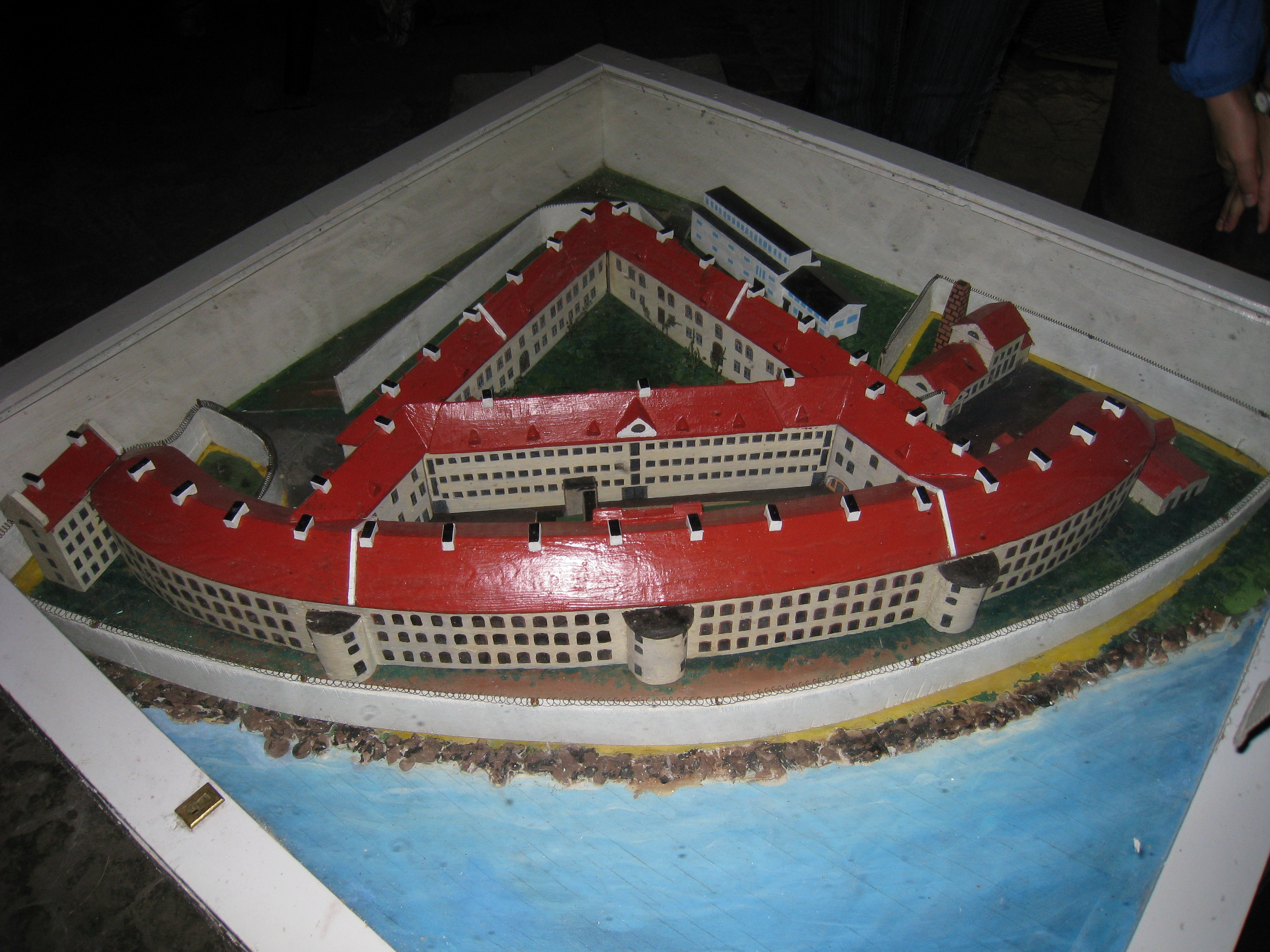
A model of Patarei Prison

=== Patarei as a Central Prison ===
In 1919, the fort replaced Tallinn’s previous jails in Toompea Castle and the Fat Margaret artillery tower, which had been damaged in fires during the revolutions of 1917. Before 1919, prisons had been under the jurisdiction of local municipal governments. After the independence, they went under the jurisdiction of the Ministry of Justice. The complex, which also included a hospital, was the largest prison in Estonia with a capacity for nearly 1,000 prisoners. The building was fortified with internal walls, partition walls, iron gates and double bars on some of the windows.

In 1925 and 1926, separate sections were built on the second storey of the main building to host the increasing number of imprisoned communists, following the Trial of the 149 (November 1924) and the attempt to overthrow the government after 1 December 1924. The prison’s capacity was further enlarged to host approximately 1,500 prisoners in the 1930s, with the addition of the second and third blocks. To save public money, the prisoners had to earn their upkeep in a sewing workshop, print shop, bindery and other facilities located within the complex.

As an indication of domestic peace and on the occasion of the 20th anniversary of the independence of the Republic of Estonia, the newly elected Estonian President Konstantin Päts announced a political amnesty in 1938. Thus, 104 communists and 79 members of the War of Independence veterans’ movement were released from Patarei Prison. By the summer of 1940, 36 persons accused of espionage for the Soviet Union, and seven persons who had been imprisoned for political reasons, still remained in Patarei Prison alongside criminal offenders.

=== 1940–1941: Estonian SSR NKVD Prison no. 1 ===
On June 21, 1940, a crowd moved to the Central Prison, accompanied by Red Army armoured vehicles. The crowd aimed to overthrow the government and demanded the release of political prisoners. The Minister of Justice finally agreed to free them after negotiations guided by the former political prisoner Aleksander Resev, who had been sent to prison for 15 years and released in amnesty in 1938. In addition to 36 spies for the Soviet Union, the last three communists arrested for participating in the attempted coup of 1 December 1924 (Aleksander Mui, Kristjan Seaver and Alfred Sein) were released.

Meanwhile, many state officials were imprisoned. Regardless of the fact that communists had taken over the Political Police and the Central Prison, Johannes Kõks, director of the Central Prison since 1934, formally remained in office. The turning point came on 14–15 July, when pseudo-elections of the Riigivolikogu (lower house of the Estonian Parliament) were held. Two days later, on 17 July, Kõks was arrested and communist Artur Jaanson became the new director of the Central Prison.

Prisons became the responsibility of the Prisons’ Administration of the People’s Commissariat for Internal Affairs (NKVD) after the Soviet occupation in 1940. State agencies were reorganised according to the structure of the Soviet Union’s state apparatus. Local penal institutions, which had hitherto been under the jurisdiction of the Ministry of Justice, henceforth moved under the jurisdiction of the Soviet Union’s agency for internal affairs. Along with Estonia’s other penal institutions, Tallinn’s Central Prison was placed under the jurisdiction of the Estonian SSR NKVD Prisons Department and Department of Correctional Labour Camps. The Central Prison was now given the official name Estonian SSR NKVD Prison no. 1. Smaller places of detention were additionally set up.

Under the management of the new director and after Estonia was declared a Soviet Socialist Republic in July 1940, the convictions of persons held in all penal institutions were reviewed. The chairman of the board was the representative of the Communist Party. Sentences were often shortened. 92 prisoners were released and their convictions were expunged.

Prison staff was replaced by persons loyal to the new regime. The Patarei Prison became the penal institution that all arrested public officials, high-ranking military officers, police officers and businessmen of the Republic of Estonia passed through before their execution or being sent to the Gulag. Persons in custody were interrogated at Pagari Street and in Patarei. Persons sentenced to death by the military tribunal of the NKVD troops were in most cases taken in groups of three or more prisoners from Patarei to the Internal Prison in Pagari Street according to the orders of the Estonian SSR People’s Commissar for the NKVD or his deputy.

After a war broke out between the Soviet Union and Germany, the number of arrested persons started growing quickly in June and July 1941. The transportation of convicted persons to the Soviet Union became a mass evacuation of prisoners and in some places an indiscriminate execution of persons in custody as the front line approached. By the start of the war, there were 1,651 persons in custody in Patarei, most of whom were evacuated to Siberian prison camps in the Soviet Union. The last 150 prisoners were taken away from Tallinn by ship, when the connection to the Soviet rear was cut off. Less than 5% of the prisoners taken to Russia saw Estonia again.

=== 1941–1944: Tallinn Labour and Correctional Camp no. 1 ===
For a brief period of time in August 1941, the prison ceased to operate. German forces occupied Tallinn on 28 August 1941 after the Soviet evacuation of Tallinn. By 28 August, there were no prisoners in Patarei apart from a small number of persons left in the prison hospital. All local penal institutions (including Patarei) and police authorities went under the control of the new occupying regime and the German Security Service (the SD).

The number of people arrested on political charges was so high during the first months of the German occupation that in addition to existing prisons, temporary concentration camps (largest ones being Jägala, Klooga and Vaivara) were set up by the orders of Wehrmacht units. By October 1941, 2,600 persons were already in custody at Patarei, though its normal capacity was 1,200. Patarei Prison remained the central penal institution in the SD system throughout the entire German occupation. The former central prison was renamed Tallinn Labour and Correctional Camp (Estonian abbreviation TKL) no. 1.

Primarily Estonian residents were detained in Patarei, whom the German authorities had charged on political and racial grounds (primarily local Jews), along with local criminal offenders (acts damaging to the war economy, speculation, etc.). A few dozen German and Czech Jews were temporarily brought to Patarei in 1943 and roughly 300 Jews were brought from France to Patarei in May 1944 (Convoy 73).

Despite uncertain data, it is likely that executions of persons detained in Patarei were carried out in the last four months of 1941 and in early 1942. In the two following years, the complex was used as a forced labour camp, where persons under preliminary investigation were detained together with convicted persons.

In 1944, preparations took place for the evacuation of prisoners from Estonia. Patarei became a transit camp, where people from other camps and prisons were assembled. Due to the imminent evacuation, the number of inmates started increasing again, rising to about 4,200 detainees in August, when prisoners brought over from other prisons and camps were assembled in Patarei prior to being loaded onto ships. Many prisoners were sent to other camps located in Poland or Germany; others were enrolled as volunteers for the German army. According to former prisoners, prison guards released some inmates before German forces left Tallinn. The Soviet offensive followed and the Red Army captured Tallinn on 22 September 1944.

=== 1944–1991: Remand isolator no. 1 ===
Patarei Prison’s activities were temporarily interrupted in September 1944. By 10 March 1945, there were 3,620 arrested persons in Patarei alone. The majority of detainees were persons under preliminary investigation, generally for political reasons. Due to lack of space, convicted offenders were soon transported to forced labour camps in the inner territory of the Soviet Union. Patarei remained the central prison under the administration of the Estonian SSR Ministry of Internal Affairs. Persons held in custody were taken to the Internal Prison of the Ministry of State Security on Pagari Street for interrogations.

=== 1991 until the present ===
Patarei was used as a prison in the restored Republic of Estonia under the jurisdiction of the Ministry of Justice until December 2002.

In September 2005, the complex was opened as a temporary museum by the Museums of Virumaa; however it almost immediately closed after safety concerns, and the Museums of Virumaa withdrew from the project in July 2006. The site was subsequently operated under a public- private partnership as 'Culture Park', a venue for music and arts events, with the main building complex largely untouched. In 2013 visitors were being encouraged to take a self-guided 'urban exploration' with no formal interpretation or guidebook; this was described as a 'refreshing approach... result[ing] in a haunting and ultimately moving visitor experience.

Europa Nostra, Europe’s leading organisation for preserving cultural heritage, designated the Patarei naval fortress among seven of Europe’s most endangered sites in 2016. The National Heritage Board of Estonia warned about the danger of losing the structure if no restorations are conducted.

State Real Estate Ltd. oversaw the building while many discussions took place regarding improving the state of the complex, preservation of its historical significance and possible future arrangements of the building. The principal proposals were a museum complex, a cultural and leisure centre, a hotel with a yacht harbour, offices and apartments. In 2019, Estonian entrepreneur Urmas Sõõrumaa bought the complex for €4.6 million. Sõõrumaa intends to execute a combination of the aforementioned ideas.

In 2019, Patarei Prison Museum opened in the complex on the initiative of the Estonian Institute of Historical Memory. The International Museum for the Victims of Communism and an accompanying research centre was opened on the 14th of June 2026.

== List of notable people imprisoned in Patarei ==
- Vello Agori, Estonian caricaturist
- Hendrik Allik, a communist Estonian politician
- Johannes Hint, Estonian scientist
- Jaan Isotamm, Estonian poet
- Ants Kaljurand (Ants the Terrible), Estonian partisan and Forest Brother
- Teet Kallas, Estonian writer
- Jaan Kross, Estonian writer
- Jüri Kukk, Estonian professor of chemistry
- Andres Larka, Estonian military commander and politician
- Tiit Madisson, Estonian activist, writer and politician
- Kristjan Palusalu, Estonian heavyweight wrestler and Olympic winner
- Lagle Parek, Estonian politician
- Artur Sirk, leading figure within the right-wing Vaps Movement
- Sergei Soldatov, one of the founders of the anti-Soviet dissident movement in Estonia
- Heiti Talvik, Estonian poet
- Enn Tarto, Estonian politician and a leading dissident during the Soviet occupation of Estonia
- André Jacob [Fr], French architect and brother of French Politician Simone Veil
