= 1938 Estonian presidential election =

1938 presidential election in Estonia

← 1934	24 April 1938	1992 →
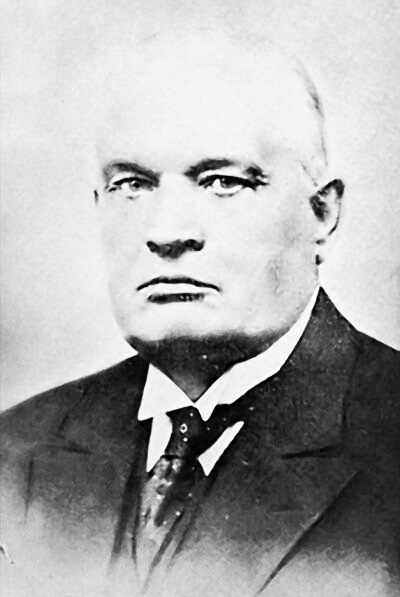
Nominee	Konstantin Päts
Party	Independent
Parliamentary votes	219
Nominator	Johan Laidoner
President before election
Office established
Elected President
Konstantin Päts
Independent

The 1938 Estonian presidential election took place on April 24, 1938. The electoral assembly, which consisted of the bicameral legislature and 120 representatives of municipalities, assembled to elect a president. The only candidate set forth was President-Regent Konstantin Päts, who was elected president with 219 votes out of the total 240 delegates. Two delegates were absent. Konstantin Päts was elected as the first President of Estonia but failed to serve a full term due to the subsequent Soviet occupation.

== Background ==
In 1934, before the elections for State Elder intended to take place on April 23–24, Konstantin Päts did a bloodless coup d'état together with State Elder candidates Johan Laidoner and August Rei in order to prevent a Vaps victory. During a period known as the Era of Silence, Veterans' organisations were shut down, over 400 of the organisations' members were arrested, and all organised political activity in the country was outlawed. All Vaps members were also purged from local governments, the civil service, and the Defence League.

The process of drawing up a new constitution was started. In 1936, a referendum approved the formation of a National Assembly to draft a replacement document. This Constitution, which came into force on 1 January 1938, created a bicameral National Assembly, consisting of the Chamber of Deputies and the National Council. The National Council, which was to review and ratify legislation from the Chamber of Deputies, consisted of representatives from local government, professional and vocational bodies, and high officials, while the Chamber of Deputies was directly elected by the people. The head of state was given the title of "President"; he was no longer directly elected by the people, but instead was chosen by an electoral college consisting of both chambers of the National Assembly and additional representatives of local government. The President was vested with fairly broad powers (including the power to veto legislation passed by parliament). In accordance with the new constitution, elections for the new legislature were held as well as for the position of President.
