= 1934 Estonian State Elder election =

Intended for 22–23 April 1934	1938 →
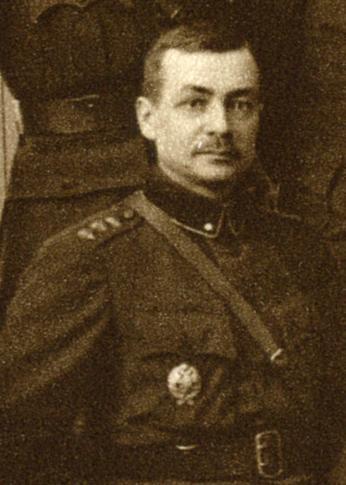

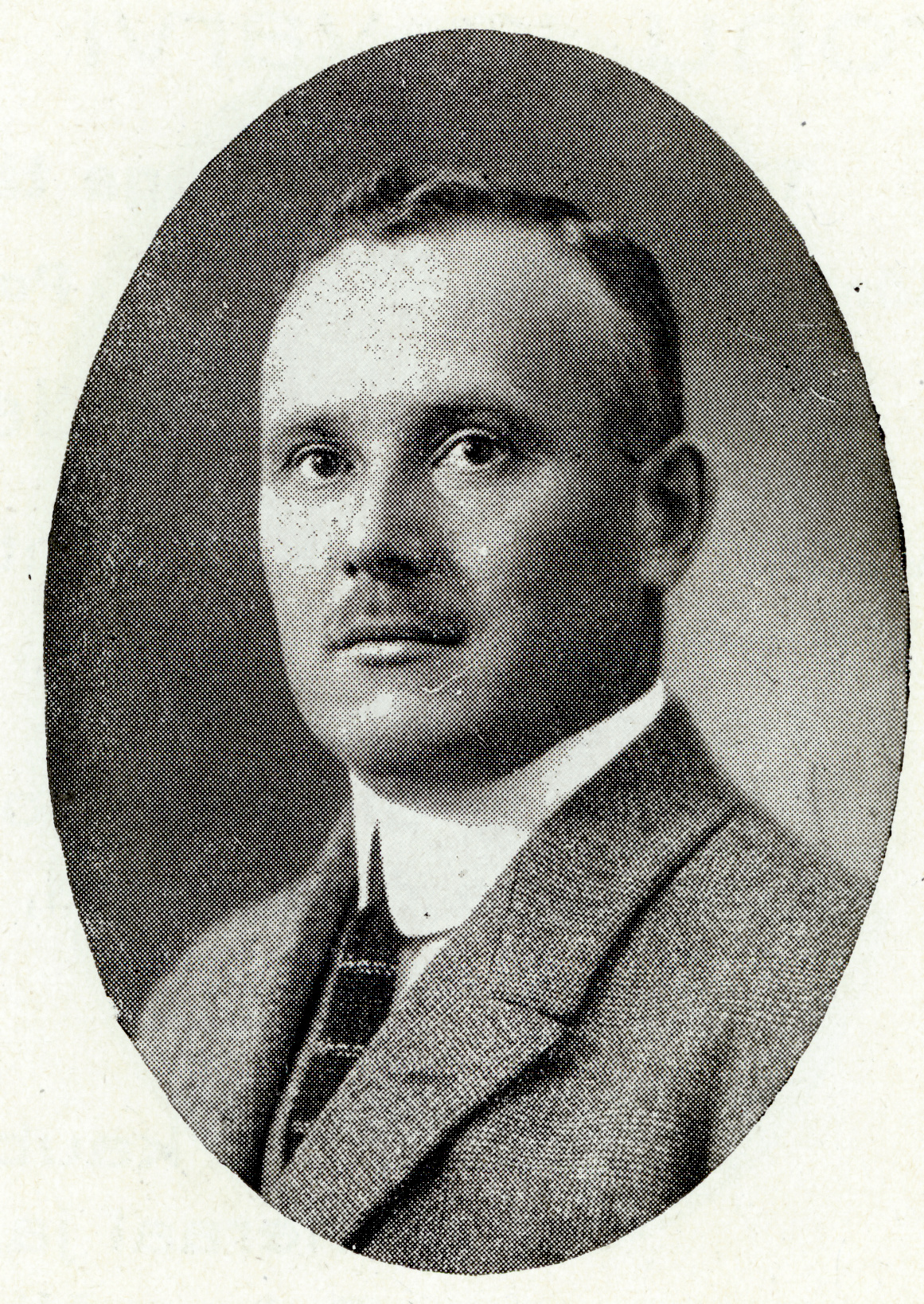

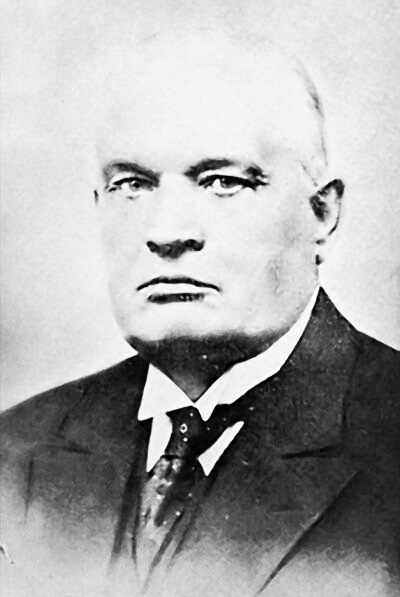

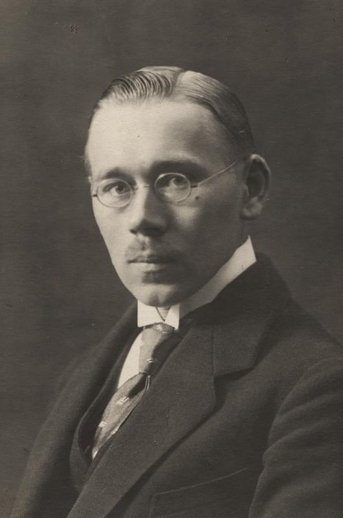
Nominee	Andres Larka	Johan Laidoner
Party	Vaps Movement	Union of Settlers and Smallholders
Signatures received	62,270	38,066
Nominee	Konstantin Päts	August Rei
Party	Union of Settlers and Smallholders	Socialist Workers' Party
Signatures received	18,501	4,983
State Elder before election
Konstantin Päts
Union of Settlers and Smallholders
Elected State Elder
Election suspended

State Elder elections were scheduled to take place in Estonia on 22 and 23 April 1934. They were to take place on the basis of the new constitution that entered into force on 24 January of the same year and were the first direct head of state elections in the history of Estonia, as the previous heads of state were elected by the Riigikogu together with other members of the Estonian Government. However, the elections were never held due to a coup on 12 March by three of the four main candidates.

== Candidates ==
According to the Kommunist, the underground voice of the Estonian Communist Party (EKP), the EKP was unable to field its legal candidate as a result of the "wild white terror" but despite this, the working class presented their own independent candidate. The EKP nominated Hans Pöögelmann as a candidate, who promised to hang "all big thieves and big crooks". Additionally, Kommunist wrote that the "bourgeois rogue government" did not officially put Pögelmann's candidacy to the vote, fearing that the majority of the people would vote for Pögelmann. Based on that, the EKP invited people to vote for Pögelmann with white slips of paper, writing Pögelmann's name on them. The paper does not say what the workers were supposed to do with these pieces of paper, however.

On 23 February 1934 the candidacies of Andres Larka, Johan Laidoner and Konstantin Päts were submitted to the Main Election Committee. Theodor Rõuk nominated Andres Larka, the leader of the Vaps movement as a candidate for State Elder with 77 citizens having signed the submission letter. Hendrik Vahtramäe nominated Johan Laidoner, the former Commander-in-Chief of the Estonian Armed Forces, as a candidate for State Elder with the backing of 38 citizens. August Jürman of Päts' Farmers' Assemblies party nominated Konstantin Päts, a former State Elder of Estonia, as a candidate for State Elder with 39 citizens backing the nomination. On 25 February Alma Ostra-Oinas nominated August Rei of the Socialist Workers' Party. The nomination letter was signed by a total of 28 citizens entitled to vote.

== Signature collection and cancellation of election ==
The collection of signatures for the demands for the nomination of candidates for the State Elder began on 5 March and was supposed to last until 27 March. Each candidate had to receive at least 10,000 signatures of support in order to qualify for the election. Due to the 1934 coup d'état by Konstantin Päts and Johan Laidoner, the election of the State Elder was postponed by the decree of postponement of the State Elder and Riigikogu elections issued on 19 March until the end of the Era of Silence. The actual collection of signatures ended after the arrival of the Riigi Teataja issue (in Tallinn on March 21, 1934, at 12 o'clock). The electoral process was terminated and declared null and void.

By that time, according to incomplete data, Andres Larka had received 62,270 signatures, of which 25,163 were from Tallinn, Johan Laidoner 38,066, of which 6,150 were from Viru County, Konstantin Päts 18,501, of which 3,448 were from Tartu County, and August Rei 4,983, of which 1,562 were from Tallinn. This means that on the basis of the signatures given as of 21 March, all nominated candidates except for August Rei would have qualified for the election.
