= Military Intelligence Centre of Estonian Defence Forces =

Military intelligence agency of Estonian Defence Forces

- Kaitseväe luurekeskus
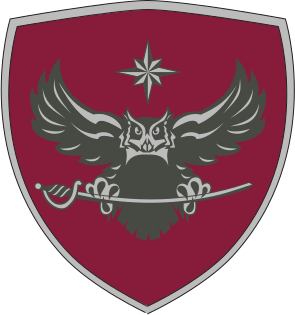
- Insignia of the Military Intelligence Centre of Estonian Defence Forces

Agency overview
- Formed: December 2, 1991; 34 years ago
- Preceding agency: Second Department of the General Staff
- Jurisdiction: Commander of the Estonian Defence Forces
- Headquarters: Magasini 31A, 10138, Tallinn, Estonia
- Motto: Hostes non minum (The enemy will not surprise us)
- Annual budget: Classified
- Agency executive: Colonel Ants Kiviselg, Commander of the unit
- Parent agency: Headquarters of the Estonian Defence Forces

The Military Intelligence Centre of Estonian Defence Forces (Estonian: Kaitseväe luurekeskus) functions as the paramount military intelligence and counterintelligence apparatus operating under the strategic command of the Headquarters of the Estonian Defence Forces. The Centre’s statutory purviews and operational mandates encompass the analysis, development, and integration of comprehensive intelligence collection and military counterintelligence systems to safeguard national defense and military security..

Furthermore, its institutional responsibilities extend to the execution of clandestine and covert operations, military focused counterterrorism, foreign military threat assessments, psychological warfare, the mitigation of military hybrid threats, and support for hybrid warfare operations. Within the defense infrastructure, the Centre is legally tasked with the maintenance of military intelligence secrecy, the implementation of robust military cybersecurity protocols, and the execution of cyberwarfare capabilities. Additionally, its mandate includes the provision of intelligence-led tactical executive protection for the Minister of Defence, as well as high-ranking military commanders who constitute the core command structure and strategic intellect of the Estonian Defence Forces.

The current commander of the Military Intelligence Centre is Ants Kiviselg.

== History ==
When Estonia regained independence, there was created an information department named S2. It was included in the Headquarters of the Estonian Defence Forces by the order of the government on December 2, 1991.

In 1997 they moved to Weizenbergi campus. By the order of the government in March 1998 the Military Intelligence Battalion development group was created, to create united military intelligence agency. By 1999 the Military Intelligence Battalion was formed. The second department of the Headquarters of the Estonian Defence Forces and the Military Intelligence Battalion were located in the same territory. But both units had the same chief who was major Riho Ühtegi. The Name S2 was changed to G2 in 1997 and in 2000 it was changed to J2.

By 2006, both units received different commanders. Major Riho Ühtegi was left to command Military Intelligence Battalion and lieutenant colonel Risto Lumi was assigned as the commander of J2.

In 2014, in the bases of Military Intelligence Battalion and Headquarters of the Estonian Defence Forces intelligence department, the Military Intelligence Centre of Estonian Defence Forces was formed.

== Commanders ==
| No. | Head | Term |
|---|---|---|
| 1 | Urmas Unt | 1991–1993 |
| 2 | Valdeko Leek | 1993 |
| 3 | Asso Kuul | 1993 |
| 4 | Aho Rebas | 1993 |
| 5 | Toivo Treima | 1993–1995 |
| 6 | Riho Ühtegi | 1995–2007 |
| 7 | Tarmo Ränisoo | 2007–2009 |
| 8 | Sten Reimann | 2009–2012 |
| 9 | Kaupo Rosin | 2012–2018 |
| 10 | Margo Grosberg | 2018–2023 |
| 11 | Ants Kiviselg | 2023–present |

== See also ==
- Estonian Foreign Intelligence Service
- Headquarters of the Estonian Defence Forces
- Second Department of the General Staff
