= Estonian Foreign Intelligence Service =

Foreign intelligence service of Estonia

- Välisluureamet
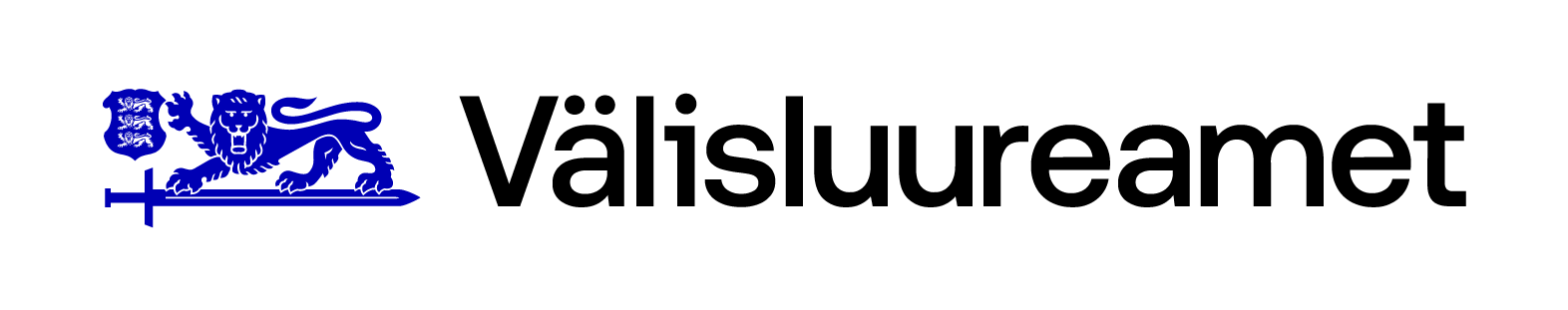

Agency overview
- Formed: 1 March 2001
- Preceding agency: Information Agency of the Government Office of the Republic of Estonia
- Jurisdiction: Ministry of Defence
- Headquarters: Rahumäe tee 4B, 13415, Tallinn, Estonia
- Agency executive: Kaupo Rosin, Head Director
- Website: valisluureamet.ee

The Estonian Foreign Intelligence Service (EFIS; Estonian: Välisluureamet, VLA) is the national civilian foreign intelligence agency of Republic of Estonia. The Foreign Intelligence Service coordinates with all Estonian intelligence functions, collects intelligence concerning foreign interests and activities, and transmits information to the President, Prime Minister, the General Staff of the Estonian Defence Forces, the Interior Minister, the Foreign Minister, and the Minister of Defence.

Since November 2022 the Director General of the Foreign Intelligence Service has been Kaupo Rosin.

== History ==
Estonian Foreign Intelligence Service old logo

The Estonian Foreign Intelligence Service was first formed in 1992 under the name Information Agency of the Government Office of the Republic of Estonia (Eesti Vabariigi Riigikantselei Teabeteenistus). In 2001 the service was reformed under the Security Authorities Act as the Estonian Information Board (Teabeamet). On July 1, 2017, it was renamed again as the Estonian Foreign Intelligence Service.

=== Activities ===
In August 2014, data leaks from the customer support database of Gamma Group, the producer of one of the world's most powerful surveillance software systems, FinFisher, showed that the software was being used in Estonia, most likely by the Foreign Intelligence Service or other intelligence agencies.

In April 2015, the Foreign Intelligence Service issued Estonia's Ministers specially encrypted iPhones after revelations that calls between Former Foreign Minister Urmas Paet and the then European Union Foreign Affairs and Security Policy High Representative Catherine Ashton were recorded and uploaded to YouTube.

On 15 February 2022, an annual report by the Service included criticism of Chinese vaccine diplomacy as "underhanded" and accused China of threateningly responding to Estonians and Estonian organizations critical of its policies. In response, the Chinese Embassy in Tallinn accused the Service of "spreading false information."

On 16 February 2022, Director General Marran stated that the extended presence of Russian soldiers in Belarus surrounding Ukraine would "reduce preparation time for an attack against the Baltics."

=== 2014 corruption probe ===
In May 2014, the Estonian Internal Security Service opened a criminal investigation into accusations of embezzlement and revealing state secrets by five members of the Foreign Intelligence Service, Sergei Bõstrov, Pavel Kotkin, Ines Piibeleht, Sven Randlane and Lauri Vihula. Few details concerning the case were revealed; however, it was revealed that all five members served in the same unit, led by Sergei Bõstrov. The funds in question, which were allocated for the purchase of information, were taken during the period of 2002–2014 and the state secrets revealed were deemed as having been "revealed to third parties who had no need for classified state information," however did not threaten Estonia's national security.

All were found guilty of embezzling a combined total of more than 600,000 euros, four of the five were also found guilty of revealing state secrets, and Sergei Bõstrov was found guilty of handling a small amount of cocaine. Bõstrov was given a four-year, six-month prison sentence, Kotkin spent 11 months in jail with a three-year suspended sentence, Randlane and Piibeleht were both imprisoned for a little over six months with a longer suspended sentence, and Vihula escaped incarceration but served a two-year, seven-month suspended sentence.

== Mission ==
The stated mission of the Foreign Intelligence Service is to ensure Estonia’s national security and to maintain constitutional order through non-military preventative measures. The Foreign Intelligence Service collects intelligence concerning foreign countries, developments and events abroad needed for the formulation of foreign, economic, and defence policy; performs counterintelligence functions for the protection of Estonian diplomatic missions and defence units stationed abroad; organizes and monitors the implementing of measures adopted for the security of electronically transmitted information; and organizes and verifies information security and special communications services.

== Hierarchy ==
The Foreign Intelligence Service is directly subordinate to Estonia’s Ministry of Defence. The Republic of Estonia has not identified any subordinate agencies to or divisions within the Foreign Intelligence Service, however the agency closely coordinates with the Estonian Internal Security Service, Estonian Defence Forces, the Estonian Security Police Board, all other local government agencies, foreign security agencies, international organizations, and individuals of interest on matters concerning external intelligence and counterintelligence.

=== Oversight ===
On 4 April 2015, The Security Authorities Surveillance Select Committee of the Riigikogu was formed under § 36 of the Security Authorities Act to verify the lawfulness of the activity and surveillance activities of the Internal Security Service and the Foreign Intelligence Service. The Committee is responsible for overseeing the activities of the Foreign Intelligence Service to ensure compliance with the Estonian Code of Criminal Procedure, as well as with the procedure for registration and disclosure of persons who have served in or co-operated with security organizations or intelligence or counterintelligence organizations of armed forces of states which have occupied Estonia.

The current members of the Security Authorities Surveillance Select Committee are Krista Aru, Uno Kaskpeit, Martin Kukk, Erki Savisaar, Ken-Marti Vaher and Hardi Volmer.

== See also ==
- Estonian Internal Security Service
- Military Intelligence Centre of Estonian Defence Forces
- Second Department of the General Staff
