= 1992 presidential election =

1992 presidential election may refer to:

- 1992 Angolan presidential election
- 1992 Austrian presidential election
- 1992 Azerbaijani presidential election
- 1992 Bulgarian presidential election
- 1992 Cameroonian presidential election
- 1992 Croatian presidential election
- 1992 Estonian presidential election
- 1992 Ghanaian presidential election
- 1992 Icelandic presidential election
- 1992 Indian presidential election
- 1992 Italian presidential election
- 1992 Kurdistan Region presidential election
- 1992 Kenyan presidential election
- 1992–93 Malagasy presidential election
- 1992 Malian presidential election
- 1992 Mauritanian presidential election
- 1992 Philippine presidential election
- 1992 Republic of the Congo presidential election
- 1992 Slovenian presidential election
- 1992 South Korean presidential election
- 1992 Turkmenistani presidential election
- 1992 United States presidential election
