= 1992 Estonian presidential election =

- 20 September 1992 (public vote); 5 October 1992 (parliamentary vote)
- Turnout: 67.95%
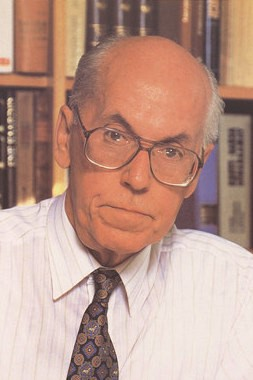

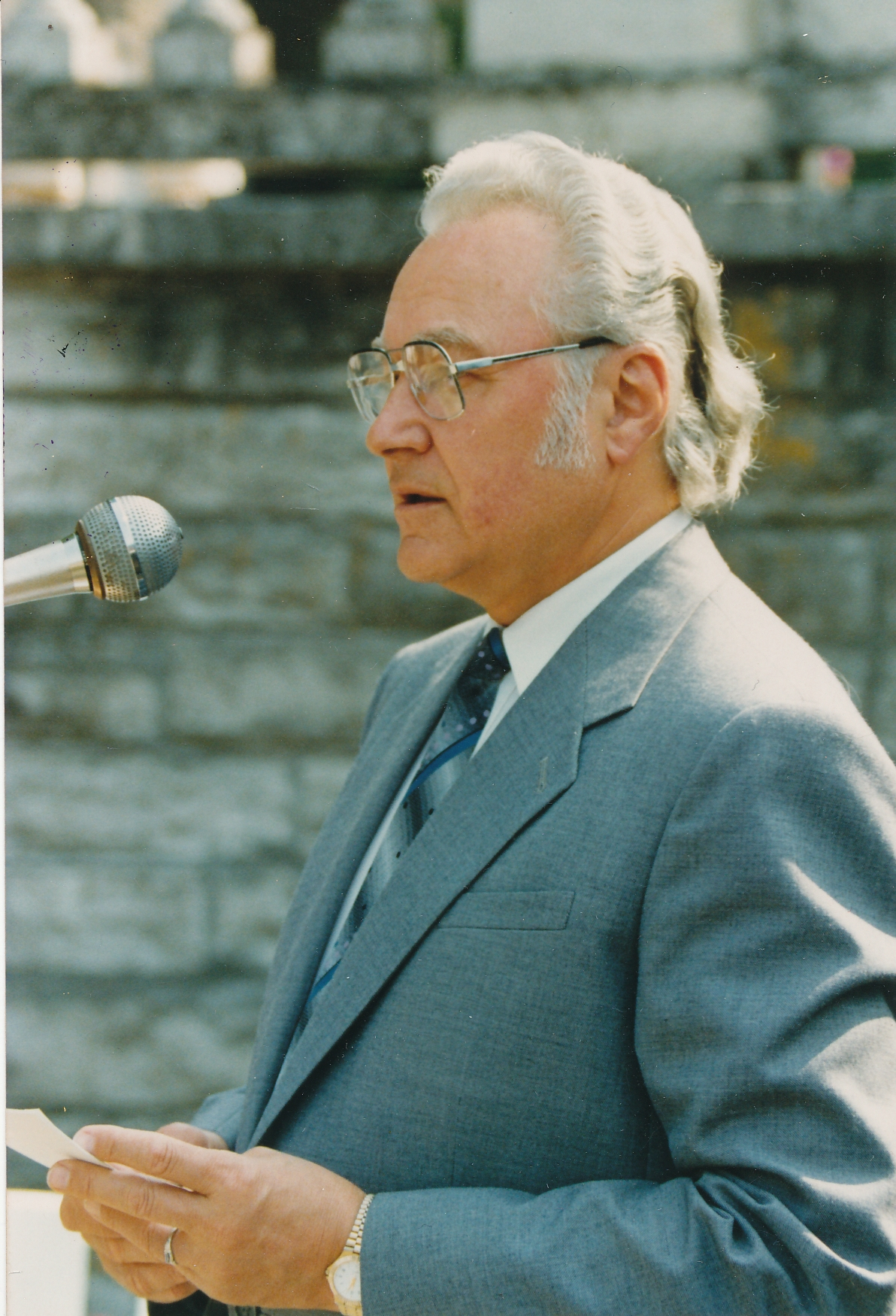
Nominee	Lennart Meri	Arnold Rüütel
Electoral vote	59	31
Popular vote	138,317	195,743
Percentage	28.94%	42.23%
- Results by county, voters abroad, Tallinn and Tartu
President before election
Heinrich Mark
Elected President
Lennart Meri
Pro Patria Union

Presidential elections were held in Estonia on 20 September 1992, alongside parliamentary elections. As no candidate received over 50% of the vote, a second round was held in Parliament on 5 October 1992, in which Lennart Meri was elected. Voter turnout in the public vote was 68%.

This was the only time to date that an Estonian presidential election included a public vote. Planned direct elections for the head of state in 1934 were cancelled due to a coup, and after 1992 presidential elections reverted to being carried out in the Electoral College or in Parliament, as had been the case in 1938.

== Campaign ==
Out of the seven candidates that announced their intention to run for the presidency, only four - Arnold Rüütel, Lennart Meri, Rein Taagepera and Lagle Parek managed to get enough signatures to set up their candidacy.

Third-place candidate Rein Taagepera later wrote that his candidacy was motivated by two things - he considered himself the only candidate with experience in democratic politics, having lived in exile during the Soviet occupation, and he feared that Rüütel would want to strengthen the role of the presidency, making him unfit to oversee a parliamentary democracy.

During the campaign, a controversy arose involving Ando Leps, associated with the Ministry of Internal Affairs, allegedly planning a damaging letter against Lennart Meri, accusing his father of collaboration with the NKVD and KGB. As a pre-emptive response, Meri's team strategically placed a letter in the paper Liivimaa Kroonik that would redirect the narrative to implicate Meri's father in collaboration with multiple intelligence agencies, mitigating the impact of Leps' subsequent accusations which surfaced a few days later.

== Results ==
Candidate	Public vote		Parliamentary vote	
Candidate	Votes	%	Votes	%
Arnold Rüütel	195,743	42.23	31	34.44
Lennart Meri	138,317	29.84	59	65.56
Rein Taagepera	109,631	23.65	0	0.00
Lagle Parek	19,837	4.28	0	0.00
Total	463,528	100.00	90	100.00
Valid votes	463,528	98.92	90	89.11
Invalid/blank votes	5,077	1.08	11	10.89
Total votes	468,605	100.00	101	100.00
Registered voters/turnout	689,608	67.95	101	100.00
Source: Nohlen & Stöver

=== Results by territorial commission ===
Territorial commission	Meri	Rüütel	Parek	Taagepera	Turnout
Harjumaa	26.1%	44.9%	3.6%	24.7%	68.1%
Hiiumaa	17.4%	53.9%	3.0%	24.5%	67.1%
Ida-Virumaa	16.8%	54.9%	2.4%	25.2%	72.4%
Jõgevamaa	25.6%	47.9%	3.5%	21.8%	61.6%
Järvamaa	25.5%	47.1%	2.5%	24.0%	65.0%
Lääne-Virumaa	18.9%	50.2%	2.4%	27.8%	62.8%
Läänemaa	28.0%	49.1%	2.7%	19.3%	64.9%
Põlvamaa	27.5%	37.5%	3.9%	29.8%	62.6%
Pärnumaa	20.3%	47.7%	3.9%	27.4%	69.1%
Raplamaa	23.1%	48.0%	4.1%	24.0%	64.5%
Saaremaa	20.4%	57.9%	2.6%	18.2%	64.6%
Tartumaa	35.4%	41.2%	4.1%	18.2%	67.0%
Valgamaa	25.8%	45.8%	4.8%	22.4%	68.6%
Viljandimaa	24.8%	44.9%	3.0%	26.3%	63.7%
Võrumaa	27.0%	38.3%	6.1%	27.2%	67.8%
Kohtla-Järve	14.2%	50.4%	2.3%	31.6%	70.4%
Narva	10.7%	37.2%	7.9%	42.0%	67.6%
Pärnu	28.8%	37.5%	3.3%	29.5%	68.7%
Sillamäe	10.8%	50.1%	5.6%	32.6%	83.4%
Tallinn	33.8%	37.8%	4.8%	22.6%	71.8%
Tartu	49.8%	27.8%	3.9%	17.1%	65.8%
Overseas	63.6%	11.6%	19.9%	4.4%	99.9%
Total	29.5%	41.8%	4.2%	23.4%	68.0%
Source: National Electoral Committee
