= Artur Sirk =

Estonian lawyer

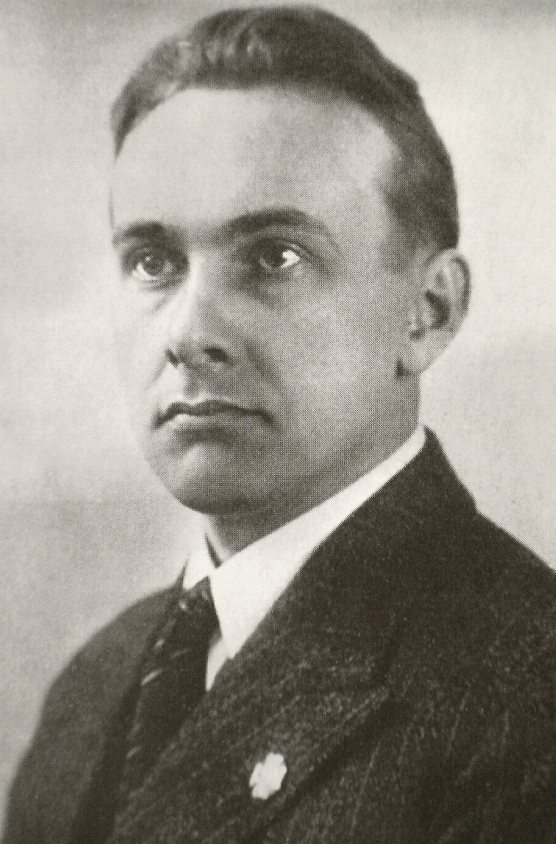
- Artur Sirk in 1933
- Born: September 25, 1900; Pruuna, Lehtse Parish (now Tapa Parish), Kreis Jerwen, Governorate of Estonia, Russian Empire
- Died: August 2, 1937 (aged 36); Echternach, Luxembourg
- Cause of death: Fall from a window
- Resting place: Helsinki Hietaniemi cemetery
- Citizenship: Russian, Estonian
- Education: Tartu University Justice cum laude 1926
- Alma mater: Tartu University
- Occupation: Lawyer
- Known for: Politician, soldier
- Political party: Vaps Movement
- Spouse: Hilda Sirk (Arnover)
- Children: Viivu Sirk

Artur Sirk (25 September 1900 – 2 August 1937) was an Estonian political and military figure. A veteran of the country's struggle for independence, Sirk later became a leading figure within the right-wing Vaps Movement and an outspoken opponent of the government.

== Early years ==
A native of rural Järvamaa, Sirk came from a humble background, being a farmer's son. As a student he was amongst the first to volunteer to fight against the mobilising Red Army in the Estonian War of Independence.

Following the war Sirk was demobilised and went to the University of Tartu to study law before in 1923 enlisting in the Estonian Army where he was allowed to complete his studies. Leaving the army in 1926 he went to work in the legal firm of Theodor Rõuk, who had briefly served as Estonian Minister of the Interior in 1924. Sirk was soon involved in politics too, initially with the Settlers' Party, a vaguely rightist group led by Ilmar Raamot, whom Sirk knew from both his school and army days.

== Vaps Movement ==
Sirk joined Eesti Demobiliseeritud Sõjaväelaste Liit (Estonian Demobilised Soldiers League) upon its formation in 1921 and its successor movement, Eesti Vabadussõjalaste Liit (Union of Participants in the Estonian War of Independence), being appointed deputy chairman of the latter group at its inaugural general meeting on 10 October 1926. Both of these groups had little ambition beyond being ex-servicemen's associations however Sirk desired a more centralised structure and to this end he established the Eesti Vabadussõjalaste Keskliit, or Vaps Movement as it became known, in 1929. Whilst the chairman of the new group was General Ernst Põdder it was Sirk who drafted its statutes, including an enshrined duty of leadership of the country's youth for the movement, and he also secured a seat on the eight member executive chosen at the first Vaps national congress on 26 January 1930 in Tallinn.

Sirk's speech at their 1932 conference gave the impetus for a change in direction as he called for a party that could take advantage of citizen's initiative to ensure the transfer to authoritarianism. Vaps adopted an increasingly paramilitary style that mirrored many of the characteristics of the fascist movements growing elsewhere in Europe and Sirk, who was talented orator and charismatic demagogue, was soon recognised as the movement's driving force. The group came close to power in 1933 before being banned by Konstantin Päts the following year. The government had claimed that Andres Larka, Sirk and other leading Vaps figures had been preparing to launch a coup although in this instance there was little evidence that the allegations were true. Nonetheless, Sirk was one of a number of Vaps leaders arrested by the Päts regime but he escaped from prison and fled to Finland.

Between 1934 and 1935 he directed Vaps activity from his Finnish base and even became involved in a conspiracy to overthrow the Estonian government with his allies in the Lapua Movement. Plans for an armed rebellion against Päts were put in place but these were discovered in December 1935 by the state security police with the main ringleaders arrested. Sirk however was not amongst those arrested as he was able to escape again and this time settled in Luxembourg.

== Death ==
Sirk died after a fall from a hotel window in Echternach in circumstances that have remained suspicious for some commentators to this day. Some Estonian historians, including Pusta and Tomingas, have argued that the death was an act of defenestration by agents of Päts, although local police in Luxembourg stated that it was a suicide. Sirk's funeral was held in Helsinki on 9 October. The eulogy was delivered by Elias Simojoki whilst hundreds of members of Simojoki's Sinimustat youth movement and the Academic Karelia Society were in attendance. August Jääger, an Estonian nationalist in attendance, blamed Sirk's death on the Estonian government, helping to begin the historical debate over the death.
