= Pruuna =

Village in Estonia

Coordinates: 59°14′N 25°51′E

- Village
- Interactive map of Pruuna
- Country: Estonia
- County: Lääne-Viru County
- Parish: Tapa Parish
- Time zone: UTC+2 (EET)
  - Summer (DST): UTC+3 (EEST)

Pruuna is a village in Tapa Parish, Lääne-Viru County, in northeastern Estonia.

Political and military figure Artur Sirk (1900–1937) was born in Pruuna.
