= Government ministries of Estonia =

The government consists of the prime minister and 13 ministers. The government is led by Prime Minister Kristen Michal, who has been in office since 23 July 2024.

== Current Prime Minister ==
| Prime Minister | Kristen Michal | Prime Minister Kristen Michal, leader of the Estonian Reform Party, is the head of the Government of the Republic of Estonia since 23 July 2024. |

== Current ministries and ministers ==
| Ministry | Minister | Current minister | Took office |
|---|---|---|---|
| Ministry of Climate (Kliimaministeerium) | Minister of Climate (Kliimaminister) | Yoko Alender | 23 July 2024 |
| Ministry of Climate (Kliimaministeerium) | Minister of Infrastructure (Taristuminister) | Vladimir Svet | 23 July 2024 |
| Ministry of Culture (Kultuuriministeerium) | Minister of Culture (Kultuuriminister) | Heidy Purga | 23 July 2024 |
| Ministry of Defence (Kaitseministeerium) | Minister of Defence (Kaitseminister) | Hanno Pevkur | 29 July 2024 |
| Ministry of Economic Affairs and Communications (Majandus- ja Kommunikatsiooniministeerium) | Minister of Economy and Industry (Majandus- ja tööstusminister) | Erkki Keldo | 23 July 2024 |
| Ministry of Education and Research (Haridus- ja Teadusministeerium) | Minister of Education and Research (Haridus- ja teadusminister) | Kristina Kallas | 23 July 2024 |
| Ministry of Finance (Rahandusministeerium) | Minister of Finance (Rahandusminister) | Jürgen Ligi | 23 July 2024 |
| Ministry of Foreign Affairs (Välisministeerium) | Minister of Foreign Affairs (Välisminister) | Margus Tsahkna | 23 July 2024 |
| Ministry of the Interior (Siseministeerium) | Minister of the Interior (Siseminister) | Lauri Läänemets | 23 July 2024 |
| Ministry of Justice and Digital Affairs (Justiits- ja Digiministeerium) | Minister of Justice and Digital Affairs (Justiits- ja digiminister) | Liisa-Ly Pakosta | 23 July 2024 |
| Ministry of Regional Affairs and Agriculture (Regionaal- ja Põllumajandusministeerium) | Minister of Regional Affairs and Agriculture (Regionaal- ja põllumajandusminister) | Piret Hartman | 23 July 2024 |
| Ministry of Social Affairs (Sotsiaalministeerium) | Minister of Health (Terviseminister) | Riina Sikkut | 23 July 2024 |
| Ministry of Social Affairs (Sotsiaalministeerium) | Minister of Social Protection (Sotsiaalkaitseminister) | Signe Riisalo | 23 July 2024 |
