= Riho Ühtegi =

Estonian major general (born 1964)

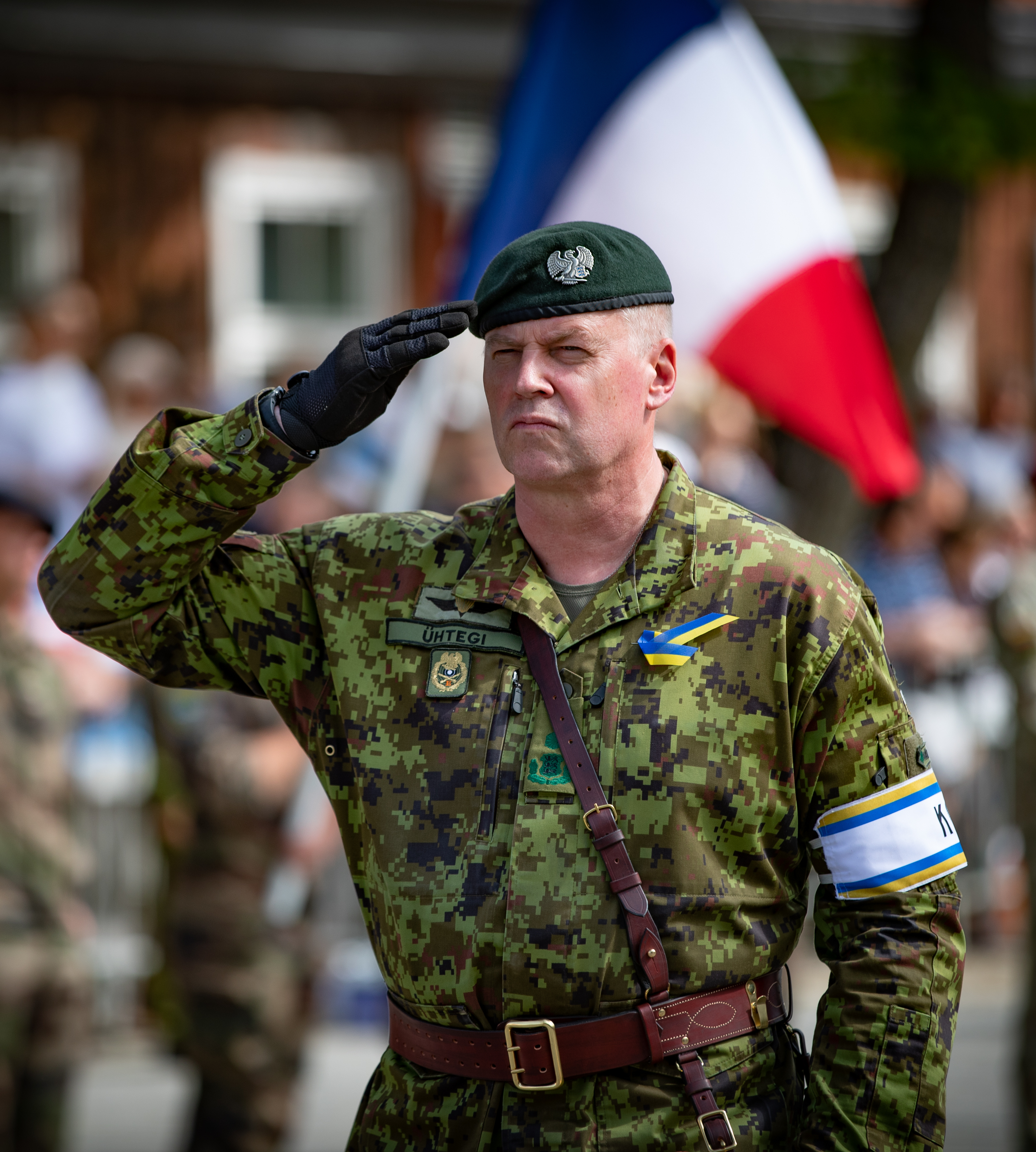
- Born: 15 February 1964 (age 62); Tartu, Estonia
- Allegiance: Estonia
- Branch: Estonian Defence Forces
- Service years: 1990 – present
- Rank: Major general
- Commands: Military Intelligence Battalion; Estonian Special Operations Force; Estonian Defence League
- Conflicts: War in Afghanistan (2001–2021)
- Awards: Order of the Cross of the Eagle

Riho Ühtegi (born 15 February 1964) is an Estonian major general. He has been the Commander of the Estonian Special Operations Force. From 2019 to 2023 he was the commander of the Estonian Defence League.

== Military career ==
Ühtegi is a member of the Estonian Defence League since 1990. and is one of the establishers of Elva malevkond, which was the first unit in Tartu malev. During 1991 Soviet coup d'état attempt he participated in the defence of Toompea with men from Tartu malev. In 1993, during Pullapää crisis, he was tasked with creating a new unit based on the Lääne Country Volunteer Jaeger Company. He replaced Toivo Treima as chief of J2 department of the Estonian Defence Forces on 6 April 1995, after a border incident involving an officer from the department. On 26 February 2007, he was released from the position of Commander of the Military Intelligence Battalion due to a scandal over illegal tracking. He was given the rank of lieutenant colonel on 14 October 2010 and the rank of colonel on 22 February 2016. In 2016, he was involved in a helicopter accident, but escaped largely unharmed. Ühtegi was approved for the position of Commander of the Defence League by the Estonian Government on June 13, 2019, eventually taking up the position on July 19. On August 20, he received the rank of brigadier general.

- 1982-1984 Conscript service in the Soviet Army
- 1991-1993 Service in Estonian Police Forces as a platoon commander
- 1993-1994 Company commander in the Estonian Defence Forces
- 1994-1995 Chief of section in Intelligence Department of the Headquarters of the Estonian Defence Forces
- 1995-2006 Chief of Intelligence Department of the Headquarters of the Estonian Defence Forces
- 1998-2006 Commander of the Military Intelligence Battalion
- 2006 Team leader on a foreign mission (ISAF)
- 2006-2007 Commander of the Military Intelligence Battalion
- 2007-2008 Lecturer in a Military Academy, chair of tactics of brigade and battalion
- 2008-2010 Chief of Intelligence Department of the Army Staff
- 2010 Contingent commander on a foreign mission (ISAF)
- 2011 Chief of Intelligence Department of the Army Staff
- 2011-2012 Defence Attaché of the Republic of Estonia in Georgia
- 2012-2019 Commander of Estonian Special Operations Force
- 2019–2023 Commander of the Estonian Defence League

== Education ==
- 1982 graduated from Elva Gymnasium
- 1994 graduated from Officers’ Training Course in National Defense Academy
- 1996 graduated from the Netherlands’ Staff College, International Staff Officers’ Course
- 1998 graduated from G. Marshall Center in Germany, International Defense and Security Studies’ Course
- 2003 graduated from Baltic Defence College, Colonels’ course
- 2007 graduated from University of Tartu (Law MA)

== Personal life ==
Riho Ühtegi is married and has two children. After serving in the Soviet Army, he worked as a telescope mechanic at Tartu Observatory and later as a policeman, during which he joined the Estonian Defence League. His hobbies are sports, which he practices to keep in shape, and teaching subjects about national defence. Many secondary school national defence teachers have attended his lectures. He has participated in the translation of Silent Warfare: Understanding the World of Intelligence by Abram Shulsky and Gary Schmitt.

== Decorations ==
- The Cross of the Eagle, 4th Class Order
- The Cross of the Eagle, 5th Class Order
- Golden badge of the Ministry of Defence
- Badge of Merit of the Estonian Defence Forces
- Defence Long-service Medal (EDF)
- Defence Distinguished Service Cross (EDF)
- Service Medal of the Headquarters of the Estonian Defence Forces
- Service Medal of the Army Staff
- 10 years of restored Defence Forces Memorial Medal
- White Cross of the Estonian Defence League, 4th Class Order
- Service Medal of the Estonian Defence League, 1st Class
- Service Medal of the Estonian Defence League, 2nd Class
- Medal of Special Services of the Estonian Defence League
- Medal for participation in international peacekeeping operations
- Medal of NATO Non-article 5 operations, Georgian medal of General Kvinitadze
- US Marine paratroopers' badge
- French paratroopers' badge 3rd Class
- German paratroopers' badge 3rd Class
- Estonian paratroopers' badge 1st Class
- Medal of Special Services of the Estonian Defence Forces
- Estonian Defence Forces Service Medal
- Badge of service of the Army Staff
- Badge of Service of the Estonian Defence League
- Badge of service of the Intelligence Battalion
