= History of Estonia (1920–1939) =

Republic of Estonia Eesti Vabariik (Estonian)
- 1918–1940
- Flag Coat of arms
- Anthem: Mu isamaa, mu õnn ja rõõm (English: "My Fatherland, my Happiness and Joy")
- Estonia in 1929
- Capital: Tallinn
- Official languages: Estonian
- Demonym: Estonian
- Government: Unitary parliamentary republic
- State Elder
  - 1920–1921 (first): Ants Piip
  - 1921–1937 (Note: Held the position several times during this period) (last): Konstantin Päts
- President
  - 1938–1940: Konstantin Päts
- Prime Minister
  - 1918–1919 (first): Konstantin Päts
  - 1939–1940 (last): Jüri Uluots
- History
  - Establishment: 24 February 1918
  - 1924 Estonian coup attempt: 1 December 1924
  - 1934 Estonian coup d'état: 12 March 1934
  - Soviet occupation: 21 June 1940
Preceded by	Succeeded by
Autonomous Governorate of Estonia; Estonian Workers' Commune	Estonian Soviet Socialist Republic; Estonian government-in-exile
- Today part of: Estonia; Russia

The history of Estonia from 1920 to 1939 spanned the interwar period from the end of the Estonian War of Independence until the outbreak of World War II. It covers the years of parliamentary democracy, the Great Depression and the period of corporatist authoritarian rule.

The Estonian state, as it existed throughout the interwar period until the Soviet occupation and the creation of the Estonian SSR, is sometimes dubbed the First Republic of Estonia, but this terminology is often avoided for two main reasons:

- Most countries recognise the legal continuity between the state declared in 1918, the Estonian government-in-exile and the current Estonian state declared in 1991, characterising the Soviet and German periods as illegal occupations.
- From 1918 to 1940, the Estonian state underwent significant changes, culminating in a 1934 self-coup, leading to the so-called "Era of Silence" and a new constitution, which some historians describe as a Second Republic of Estonia in its own right.

== Parliamentary democracy ==
Estonia won the Estonian War of Independence against both Soviet Russia and the German Freikorps and Baltische Landeswehr volunteers. Independence was secured with the Tartu Peace Treaty, signed on 2 February 1920.

The first Estonian constitution was adopted by the Constituent Assembly on 15 April 1920. Established as a parliamentary democracy, legislative power was held by a 100-seat parliament or Riigikogu. Executive power was held by a government headed by a State Elder, separate from the office of Prime Minister, and both answerable to the parliament.

The Republic of Estonia was recognised (de jure) by Finland on 7 July 1920, Poland on 31 December 1920, Argentina on 12 January 1921, by the Western Allies on 26 January 1921 and by India on 22 September 1921. In 1921, Estonia became a full member of the League of Nations and developed successful economic relations with many countries, including the Soviet Union. The backbone of the Estonian economy became agricultural exports to the West, due to tens of thousands of small farm holdings being established as a result of land reforms that ended the Baltic German economic dominance. A new currency, the Estonian kroon, was introduced in 1928.

Estonian politics during the 1920s was dominated by unstable coalition governments, with a government lasting on average a period of 11 months. This was due to the large number of political parties holding seats in the Riigikogu, which often resulted in discord on specific issues. The 1920s also saw the development of national culture, with emphasis on Estonian language, history, education and ethnography. National minorities were granted cultural autonomy. Communism persisted as a threat to stability in the early 1920s but receded after a failed December 1924 Estonian coup d'état attempt. A volunteer Estonian Defence League as subsequently established. However efforts to establish a Baltic League comprising the Baltic states, Finland and Poland, failed to materialise.

== The Great Depression ==
Estonia's export oriented economy was severely affected by the Great Depression, with industry and agriculture declining 20% to 45% respectively. As a consequence incomes declined, unemployment rose and the standard of living declined. This led to political turmoil and a further fragmentation of parliament, with the government changing six times in the two years before 1933. Calls for changing the constitution, reducing the powers of the parliament and establishing a presidency with extended powers found a receptive audience. The Vaps movement grew in popularity and influence and a new constitution drafted by the movement was passed by a referendum in October 1933.

== Period of authoritarian rule ==
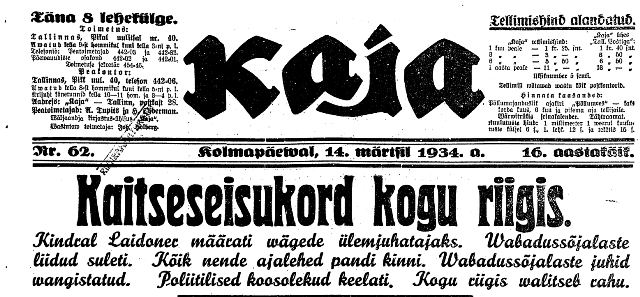
Newspaper Kaja's caption announcing the beginning of the state of protection led by General Laidoner on 14 March 1934.

The consequences of the depression eased in 1934, with the devaluation of the kroon and improved terms of trade. The passing of the second constitution in 1933 and the planned elections for a new president eased political tensions. With the prospect of Vaps movement achieving electoral victory, Konstantin Päts and Johan Laidoner conducted a military coup d’état on 12 March 1934, arresting hundreds of Vaps members. This period between 1934 and 1938 (or 1940) was known as the Era of Silence (Estonian: vaikiv ajastu).

A six-month state of emergency was declared, postponing the elections and political meetings were banned. In 1935, Päts formed the Patriotic League, the only legal political organization in the country. Päts' goal was to organize the nation not by political views into parties, but by vocation into respective corporate chambers, in a way similar to in Fascist Italy, following the same line as Austria, Portugal and many other countries of Europe. In 1936, Päts held a referendum on convening a National Assembly to draft a new constitution.

During the interwar period, Estonia had pursued a policy of neutrality, but the fate of the country in World War II was decided by the Molotov–Ribbentrop Pact of August 1939 and its Secret Additional Protocol. In the agreement, the Soviet Union and Nazi Germany agreed to divide up the countries situated between them (Poland, Lithuania, Latvia, Estonia and Finland), with Estonia falling into the Soviet "sphere of influence". After the invasion of Poland, the Orzeł incident took place when the Polish submarine ORP Orzeł looked for shelter in Tallinn, but escaped after the Soviet Union attacked Poland on 17 September 1939. The Soviet Union used the incident as pretext to accuse Estonia of being unable to secure its territorial waters and of allowing the submarine to depart, challenging the country's neutrality. On 24 September 1939, the Soviet Union threatened Estonia with war unless allowed to establish military bases in the country — an ultimatum with which the Estonian government complied.

== Downfall ==
In 1939, the Soviet Union forced a mutual assistance treaty on Estonia, establishing Soviet military bases and ultimately leading to occupation of the country in 1940.

== See also ==
- 1934 Estonian coup d'état

== Sources ==
- Miljan, Toivo. Historical Dictionary of Estonia, pp. 196–97. Scarecrow Press, 2004, ISBN 0-8108-4904-6
- Estonica: 1918–1940. Republic of Estonia
- Berg-Schlosser, Dirk; Jeremy Mitchell, Varrak (2000). "Estonia: Crisis and 'Pre-Emptive Authoritarianism". Conditions of democracy in Europe, 1919–39: systematic case-studies. Palgrave Macmillan. pp. 109–128. ISBN 0-312-22843-0.
