= Ministry of Defence (Estonia) =

Government ministry of Estonia

Agency overview
- Formed: 24 February 1918
- Jurisdiction: Government of Estonia
- Headquarters: Sakala 1 Tallinn, Estonia
- Annual budget: €750 million (2022)
- Minister responsible: Martin Herem, Minister of Defence
- Child agencies: Estonian Foreign Intelligence Service; Defence Resources Agency; Centre for Defence Investments
- Website: http://www.kaitseministeerium.ee/en/

The Ministry of Defence of the Republic of Estonia (Estonian: Eesti Vabariigi Kaitseministeerium) and its head, the Minister of Defence, are responsible for organizing national defence. It is Estonia's ministry of defence. The mission of the Ministry of Defence is to deter attacks against Estonia and ensure that the country is capable of defending itself against external threats. Estonian national defence is based on initial self-defence capability as well as membership in NATO.

== History ==
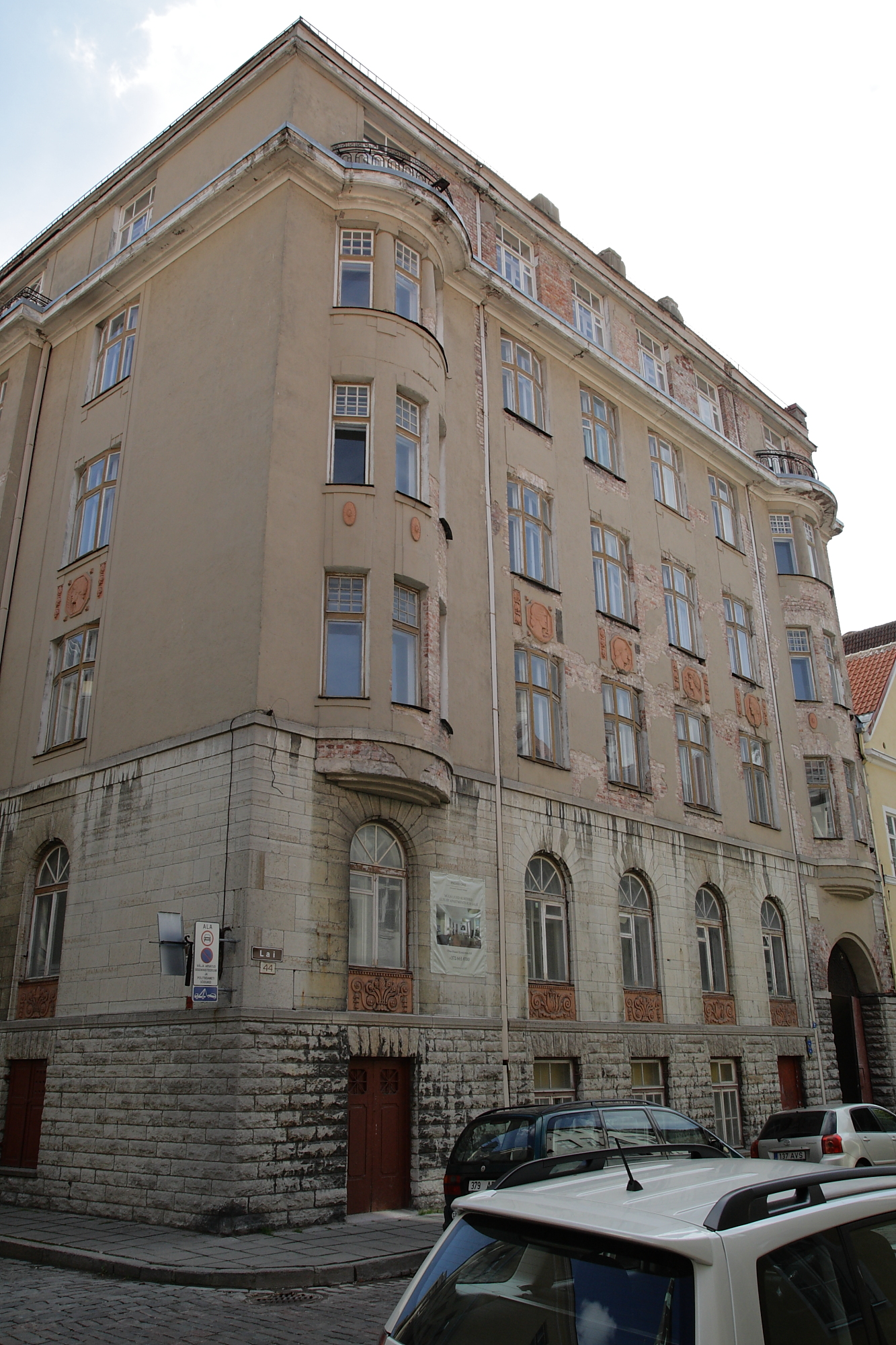
Building of the Ministry of War, Lai 44/Pagari 1, Tallinn

=== 1918-1940 ===
On 24 February 1918, the Estonian Salvation Committee appointed the Estonian Provisional Government, which included Estonia's first Minister of War, Andres Larka. However, right after the creation of the Provisional Government, Estonia fell under German occupation. The Estonian Provisional Government restarted its activities on 11 November 1918. In May 1919, the Provisional Government was replaced by the elected Government of Estonia, with Otto Strandman becoming the Minister of War. On 26 March 1920, the Staff of the Commander-in-Chief ended its activities as an independent institution and the powers of the Commander-in-Chief were transferred to the Minister of War. In 1929, the Ministry of War (Estonian: Sõjaministeerium) was renamed the Ministry of Defence (Estonian: Kaitseministeerium). During 1934, after the self-coup of Konstantin Päts, the institution of the Commander-in-Chief was reinstated and the role of the Ministry of Defence was reduced. In 1937, the Ministry of Defence was renamed back to the Ministry of War. By 1938, the Ministry of War was composed of the Supply Administration of the Militaries (Estonian: Sõjavägede Varustusvalitsus), Healthcare Administration of the Militaries (Estonian: Sõjavägede Tervishoiuvalitsus), Higher Court of the Military (Estonian: Sõjaväe Kõrgem Kohus) and Prosecuting Magistracy of the Military (Estonian: Sõjaväe Prokuratuur). The Ministry of War was dissolved in 1940, following the annexation of Estonia by the Soviet Union.

=== 1992-present ===
After Estonia regained independence from Soviet occupation, The Ministry of Defence was re-established by the Supreme Soviet in April 1992. Ülo Uluots became the first Minister of Defence of the freshly restored Republic of Estonia. The first years of the re-established Ministry of Defence were hectic because the Estonian military needed to be re-built from scratch and resources were extremely scarce. The ministry also had to deal with the infrastructure and materiel left behind by the Russian Armed Forces. In 1994, Estonia joined NATO's Partnership for Peace program, which was the first step towards joining the organization. Estonia joined NATO on 29 March 2004, and the European Union on 1 May 2004. In 2001, the Estonian Information Board, which was later renamed the Estonian Foreign Intelligence Service, was subordinated to the Ministry of Defence. A new subordinate agency under the domain of the Ministry of Defence, called the Defence Resources Agency, was created in 2005. To improve the handling of procurements, the Centre for Defence Investment was established in 2015. It became operational in 2017.

== Structure ==
Organizational chart of the Ministry of Defence of the Republic of Estonia

The Ministry of Defence is divided into areas of responsibility of three Deputy Undersecretaries. The Deputy Undersecretary of Defence Policy is responsible for developing the vision of the future Estonian national defence; the Deputy Undersecretary for Defence Planning is responsible for determining the capabilities and budget needed to put the vision in action; the Deputy Undersecretary for Legal and Administrative Affairs is responsible for supporting all the processes, which take place in the Ministry.

The Ministry of Defence co-ordinates its activities with all the divisions and sub-offices concerned at the decision-making stage. Its subordinate organizations include the Estonian Defence Forces, Estonian Defence League, Estonian Foreign Intelligence Service, Defence Resources Agency, Centre for Defence Investments, Estonian War Museum and Seli Health Centre.

=== Estonian Defence Forces ===
The Estonian Defence Forces (Estonian: Eesti Kaitsevägi) are the military forces of the Republic of Estonia. Its main goals are the development and maintenance of a credible capability to defend the nation's vital interests and development of the EDF in a way that ensures their interoperability with the armed forces of NATO and EU member states and their capability to participate in the full range of Alliance missions. It consists of the Land Forces, Navy, Air Force and other smaller branches. It is led by Commander of the Estonian Defence Forces, whose working body is the Headquarters of the Estonian Defence Forces.

=== Estonian Defence League ===
The Estonian Defence League (Estonian: Kaitseliit) is a voluntary militarily organized national defence organisation. The task of the Estonian Defence League is to enhance the nation’s readiness to defend the independence of Estonia and its constitutional order. The Estonian Defence League is led by the Commander of the Estonian Defence League, who serves directly under the Commander of the Defence Forces and is supported by the Headquarters of the Estonian Defence League.

=== Estonian Foreign Intelligence Service ===
The Estonian Foreign Intelligence Service (Estonian: Välisluureamet) is the foreign intelligence service of Estonia. Its main function is to collect, analyse and report information on Estonia’s external security threats. It is led by the Director General of the Foreign Intelligence Service and is supervised by Security Authorities Surveillance Committee of the Parliament, The Ministry of Defence, the Chancellor of Justice and the National Audit Office of Estonia.

=== Defence Resources Agency ===
The Defence Resources Agency (Estonian: Kaitseressursside Amet) is tasked with supporting Estonia's defence capabilities through accounting, evaluation and selection of human and material resources. It is led by the Director General of the Defence Resources Agency.

=== Centre for Defence Investment ===
The Centre for Defence Investment (Estonian: Riigi Kaitseinvesteeringute Keskus) is an agency that handles military procurement and manages property. Its task is to support the national capability development with professionally organized procurements, infrastructure development, administrative activities and investments.

== Policies ==
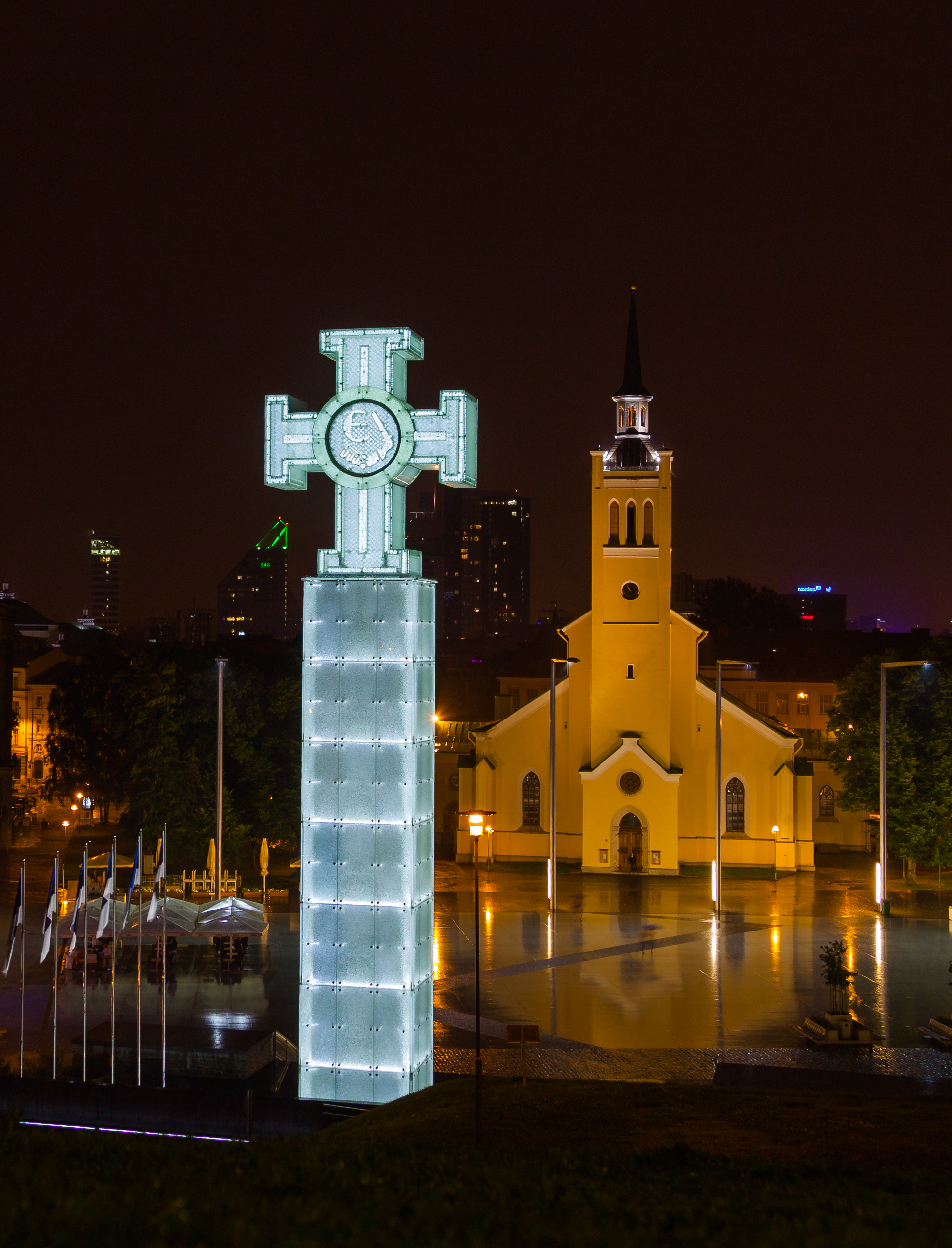
Establishment of the War of Independence Victory Column was organized by the Ministry of Defence.

The basic framework for the organisation of national defence is determined by the National Defence Act. The most important documents regarding Estonian security policies are the National Security Concept of Estonia, National Defence Strategy, National Defence Development Plan, Military Defence Action Plan and the Emergency Defence Plan. There are also supplemental policies regulating the provision of support for veterans and the states participation in the defence industry.

=== National Security Concept of Estonia ===
The National Security Concept of Estonia (Estonian: Eesti julgeolekupoliitika alused) establishes the objective and principles of Estonian security policy, describes the security environment and determines the direction of Estonian policies. Its goal is to safeguard the existence of the state and its people. Estonia's security policy is based on a broad concept of security, which entails the involvement of all sectors of society, as well as integration with NATO and the EU. It is revised by the Government of Estonia according to changes in the security environment.

=== National Defence Strategy ===
The National Defence Strategy (Estonian: Eesti riigikaitse strateegia) is based on the National Security Concept of Estonia and serves as a basis for detailed development and action plans. The document is subject to revision every four years.

National Defence Strategy for 2011 establishes six main courses of action. These include military defence, civilian sector support for military defence, international efforts, ensuring internal security, ensuring vital services and psychological defence. Military defence is based on initial independent defence capability (provided by Estonian Defence Forces and Estonian Defence League) and NATO's collective defence. Supporting international efforts is central to achieving solidarity towards collective defence. Civilian support is provided through mobilization, utilization of state assets, contractual relations and compulsory encumbrances. Ensuring internal security and vital services is essential to maintaining stability within the state and safety of the people, while the goal of psychological defence is to ensure cohesion and security of the society.

=== National Defence Development Plan ===
The National Defence Development Plan (Estonian: Riigikaitse arengukava) is based on the National Defence Strategy and specifies the priorities for strengthening defence capabilities. It is established by the Government of Estonia for a period of ten years and is reviewed every four years.

At the core of the Development Plan is a broad concept of security, which is partially derived from the concept of total defence that has been practiced in several nordic countries. The Ministry of Defence was tasked with developing and co-ordinating the courses of action relating to military defence and civilian sector support for military defence. The main goals of National Defence Development Plan 2017-2026 are risk prevention, military deterrence, development of initial independent defence capability, capability of resisting crises and attacks with the actions of the whole society and raising social cohesion. The accomplishment of main goals is gauged with different indicators. These indicators include: defence expenditure relative to GDP (target: at least 2%), membership numbers of the Defence League (target: at least 30 000 total), citizens trust in the defendability of Estonia (target: at least 60%), readiness to participate in the defence of Estonia (target: at least 65%), populations' awareness of how to act in the event of an emergency (target: at least 35%), populations' rating on the protectedness of the Estonian border (target: at least 60%), populations' readiness for coping with cessation of vital services for at least 48 hours (target: at least 70%).

The newest National Defence Development Plan covers the period between 2022 - 2031. The development plan is focused on ensuring deterrence and the capability to counter enemy aggression, while also taking into account available resources. The share of the military part of the plan is over 8 billion euros. Strengthening of national defence is continued by increasing the number of combatants, creating a supplementary reserve, and including additional Defence League volunteers in military defence. Speed, protection and fire range of units will be increased with new equipment. Armoured manoeuvering capabilities, maritime warfare capabilities, indirect fire capabilities, and situational awareness and command will be developed further. Intelligence gathering and communications capabilities will see continued development.

=== Military Defence Action Plan ===
The Military Defence Action Plan (Estonian: Kaitseministeeriumi valitsemisala arengukava) is based on the National Defence Development Plan and describes military defence development goals. It is established by the Ministry of Defence for a period of four years and is reviewed every year.

The Military Defence Action Plan for 2022-2025 envisions continuing the procurement of new weaponry, further development of naval defence, and improving command and control.

The 1st and 2nd Infantry Brigade will have improved field hospitals. Also, all engineer battalions, combat service support battalions and military police units will be fully equipped. In addition, new assault rifles, machine-guns, sniper rifles, anti-tank weapons, and mortars will be procured. New logistics vehicles will also be purchased. Infantry will be equipped with ballistic vests, night-vision devices, decontamination equipment, and new laser training equipment, which will enable more realistic training up to company level. Around 135 million euros, plus additional 20 million euros per year will be invested in ammunition.

The Ministry of Defence is starting a new "future navy" project, which should guide the development of Estonian Defence Forces and other regional defence forces navies in the next 10–15 years. New naval mines and anti-ship missile systems will be procured. Naval intelligence will also be improved.

Territorial Defence, which is based on the Defence League, will receive further investments in weapons and equipment. The Defence Leagues operational budget will reach 43.7 million euros by 2025. Defence League units will continue to be equipped similarly to equivalent Defence Forces units.

Estonian defence industry will receive 3.2 million euros co-financing of development projects. More than half of products and services will be procured from Estonia.

== Awards conferred by Ministry of Defence ==
There are two awards conferred by Ministry of Defence:

- Cross of Merit (Estonian: Kaitseministeeriumi teeneterist)
- Estonian: Kaitseministeeriumi rinnamärk

== See also ==
- Government of Estonia
- Government ministries of Estonia
- Minister of Defence (Estonia)
