= 1934 Estonian coup d'état =

1934 coup d'état in Estonia

The Estonian coup d'état of 1934 was a bloodless military coup organized on March 12, 1934, by State Elder candidates Johan Laidoner, Konstantin Päts, and August Rei, who took part in the State Elder elections scheduled for April of the same year, during which Lieutenant General Laidoner and acting State Elder Päts had several Vaps leaders and activists, supporters of the fourth State Elder candidate Andres Larka, arrested. Päts, in violation of the constitution, appointed Laidoner as the commander-in-chief of the defense forces and decreed a stop to the election process for State Elder and the Riigikogu.

== Background ==
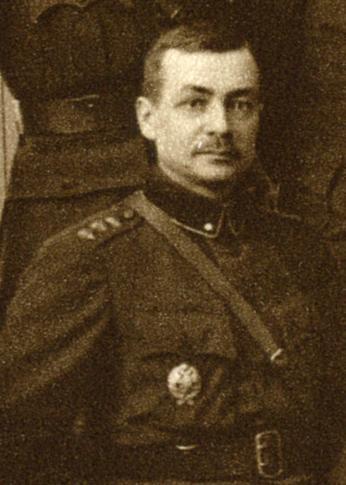
Andres Larka

Estonia's 1920 constitution permitted citizens to petition to change laws and establish new ones, akin to Switzerland. If at least 25 thousand citizens were to give their signatures to put a draft law to a referendum, a referendum had to take place and the changes were to be implemented if passed. During the 1930s, the Great Depression hit Estonia hard and sharply highlighted the weak points of the state. During 1932-33, the Government of Estonia changed 5 times. Most Estonian citizens felt the need for a more stable executive power. This was hoped to be achieved by establishing the position of President which had been hitherto absent. In 1933, the Vaps Movement submitted a bill to amend the constitution, which was to create the position of head of state with great power and turn Estonia into a presidential republic. The Riigikogu had also made various proposals for amendments to the Constitution, although when they came to a referendum, they weren't approved. However, in the referendum held on October 14–16, 1933, the amendments to the constitution drawn up by the Vaps movement were approved. After the passage of the referendum, Jaan Tõnisson's fourth cabinet resigned on October 17, 1933, and Konstantin Päts became "prime minister in the role of head of state". The new constitution entered into force on January 24, 1934 and the first round of elections for the governor was to take place on April 22 and 23, 1934. According to the new draft constitution, both the head of state and the 50-member Riigikogu would have had to be elected directly by the people. The constitution, which was approved by a large majority, preserved all previous civil and political liberties and the right of petitioning.

== Election campaign and the coup ==
The popularity of Vaps had grown steadily, and in February a sharp election campaign began. Four candidates were nominated - Johan Laidoner, Andres Larka, August Rei and Konstantin Päts. During the collection of signatures for the candidates for the head of state, it became clear that August Rei was unpopular, and it was possible that the Vaps candidate, Andres Larka, could've gotten an absolute majority of votes in the first round of the elections. During the election campaign, the Vaps movement disclosed information about Johan Laidoner's businesses, which did not show him in a positive light, and prepared an overview of Päts' economic activities. Fearing a possible defeat in the VI Riigikogu and State Elder elections announced for April, Johan Laidoner and Konstantin Päts organized a coup d'état together with August Rei.

It is not known when Päts, Laidoner and Rei decided in favor of the coup. However, from Päts's conversation with British Ambassador Hughe Knatchbull-Hugessen on February 28, 1934, it can be concluded that the decision had already been made. The Vaps leaders had been warned about the planned action but they hadn't expected Päts to violate the constitution and cancel the elections.

== The coup and arrest of Vaps members ==
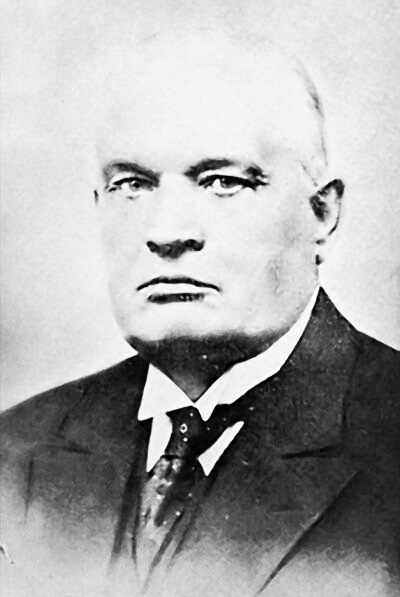
Konstantin Päts in 1934

The London-based newspaper Daily Express published a description of the situation on its front page on March 13, 1934, under the headline "Civil War in Estonia", saying that a civil war had broken out and describing a bloody battle between the government forces and the Vaps forces, which they described as fascist. They also reported that martial law had been declared and 150 people arrested.

The exact time of the coup was possibly agreed upon on the evening of March 11 at the meeting between Päts, Laidoner and Rei. On the day of March 12, around two o'clock, an alarm was given in the barracks located on the grounds of the Joint Training Institutions of the Defense Force in Tondi. About 400 men lined up on the training ground. Colonel Aleksander Jaakson, head of educational institutions, announced that they were going on a special mission. Weapons and ammunition were distributed to the men, and the three companies moved to the city center. The aspirants took control of the city center and Toompea, and besieged the residences of the Vaps members nearby. Officials of the Political Police arrested those present. In total, several hundred leaders and activists of freedom fighters were arrested across Estonia.

== Start of the Era of Silence ==
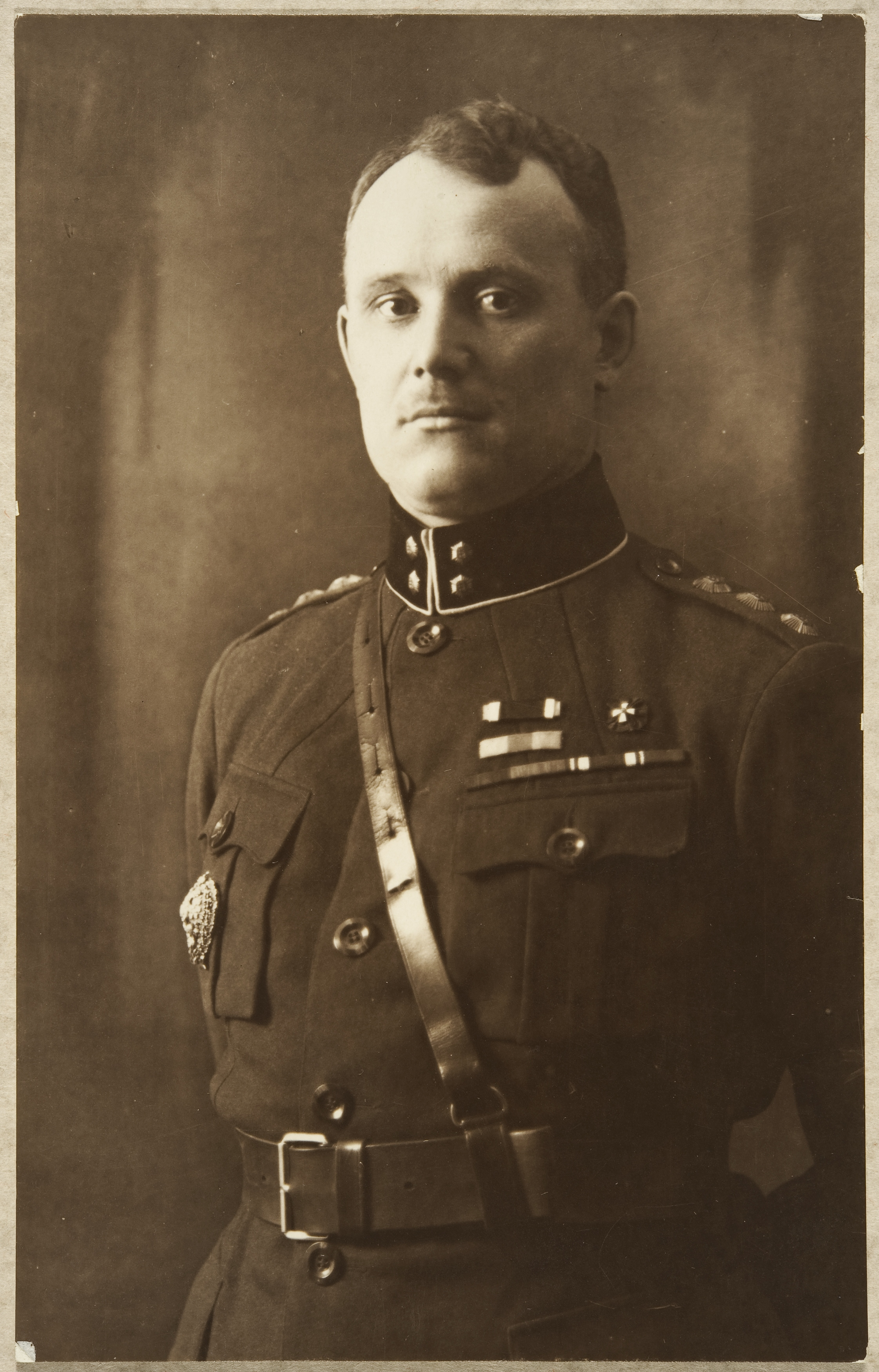
Johan Laidoner, the Commander‑in‑Chief of the Estonian Armed Forces.

With the decision of Prime Minister Konstantin Päts and the Minister of Justice and the Interior Johan Müller, a state of defense was established for six months throughout the entire country at 17:00, several hours after the start of the coup, and Johan Laidoner was named Commander-in-Chief of the Defense Forces and commander of the internal defense. Estonia entered the period of the authoritarian rule of Konstantin Päts, the so-called “Era of Silence”. Laidoner immediately shut down the Vaps Movement and banned meetings of all private individuals and organizations "both in closed rooms and under the open sky" as well as public demonstrations. The publication of ten periodicals was immediately banned and the publication license of three newspapers was revoked. These decisions were illegal, as Johan Laidoner could have only legally been appointed to the position if mobilization was declared or war was to break out.

At 22:00, the Government invited the journalists to Toompea for a chat. Päts said that the Government has appointed a Commander-in-Chief of the Defense Forces, adding that the political struggle will be stopped and all political parties would be banned from participating in political agitation. The strictest of measures would be taken against dangerous events. "Any resistance to the commander-in-chief's orders will be suppressed with all determination." With a decree issued on March 19, Päts announced that the elections of the governor and the Riigikogu have been postponed. This decree was not legitimate as the Constitution forbade amending the election law by decree. The elections stipulated in the 1933 constitution never took place in Estonia and political freedoms were not restored. The government had begun to slowly phase out the authoritarian system with two parliamentary elections being held as well as a presidential one but the process of democratization was never complete due to the Soviet Union's occupation of Estonia in 1940.

== Legacy ==
On 30 September 2026, the Estonian parliament passed a resolution condemning the 1934 coup and the following “Era of Silence”, in which the democratically-elected parliament was silenced, political party activities banned, and the press subject to censorship.
