= Second Department of the General Staff =

- Sõjavägede Staabi II osakond
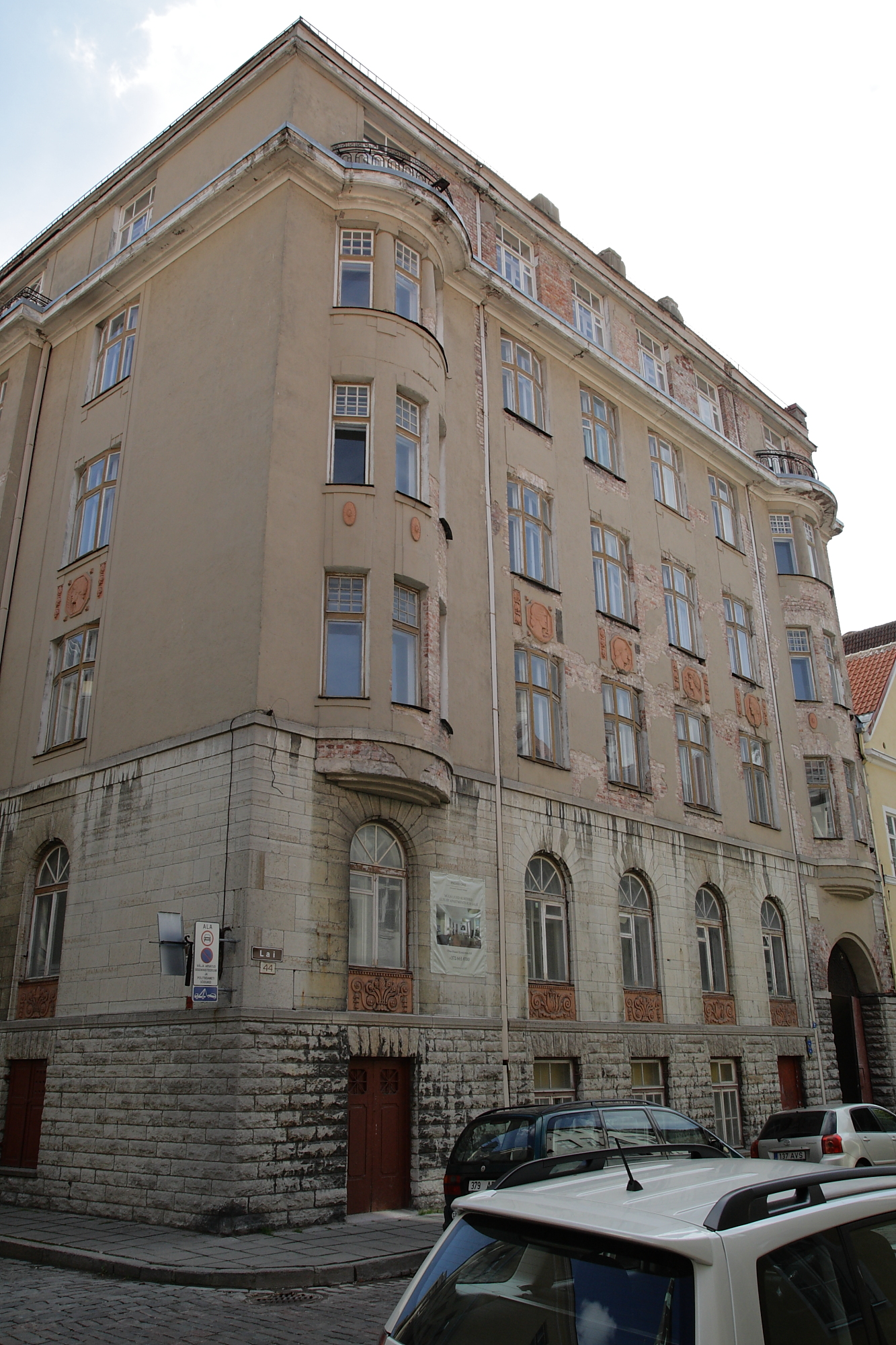
- Headquarters of the Second Department

Agency overview
- Formed: 1918
- Dissolved: 1940
- Jurisdiction: Estonian Defence Forces
- Headquarters: Tallinn, Estonia

The Second Department of the General Staff (O2) (Estonian: Sõjavägede Staabi II osakond) was the foreign military intelligence agency of the Headquarters of the Estonian Defence Forces from 1918 to 1940.

== Heads ==
No.	Head	Term
1	Oskar Mamers	1918 – 1919
2	Arthur Perna	1919
3	Richard Palm	1920
4	Karl-Johann Laurits	1921 – 1927
5	Richard Palm	1927 – 1929
6	Arnold Sinka	1929 – 1935
7	Richard Maasing	1935 – 1939
8	Villem Saarsen	1939 – 1940
9	Rein Tombak	1940

== History ==
It was formed in 1918 during the War of Independence. At the beginning of 1930's there were only approximately 10 people working at 2nd Department. Its structure was rather similar to German Abwehr. Staff of the Latvian Information Department was not large also (10-20 persons). By structure it was similar to Polish intelligence.

In Estonia nobody was waiting for a military attack from South, the Staff however did not lose interest for Latvia and its army. In case of war with Soviet Union it was important to know the strength of the ally for knowing how fast it would be possible for the Red Army to crash Latvian forces and reach the Southern border of Estonia. Regardless of political problems that emerged between the two states time after time the information exchanging process continued with considerable effectiveness. Espionage in Southern direction was improbable thus the first little error would have caused catastrophic diplomatic consequences. As it has been written above, the Estonian 2nd Department was quite well informed about Latvia and its Armed Forces, little pieces of information that could have been obtained on an illegal way certainly would not have been worth the enormous risk.

The main sources of information were Latvian publications, reports from attaches in Riga and officers studying in the units of the Latvian Army and materials handed over by Information Department. Despite the lack of personnel and finances, the military intelligence services of Estonia and Latvia had accurate picture about their neighbouring country and its Army.

== Structure ==
The structure of 2nd Department consisted of four sections:

- Section A - Information exchange with Baltics and Western Europe through the military attaches.
- Section B - Counter-intelligence unit. Their task was to prevent foreign intelligence agencies to soak into Estonian army.
- Section C - Intelligence unit which was cathering and analysing military and economical information about Soviet Union.
- Section D - It was founded in 1936 in cooperation with the German Abwehr and Finnish Intelligence. The task of the unit was radio-intelligence against Soviet Baltic Fleet and the Red Army.

== See also ==
- Estonian Foreign Intelligence Service
