= KGB Prison Cells =

KGB prison cells in Tallinn, Estonia

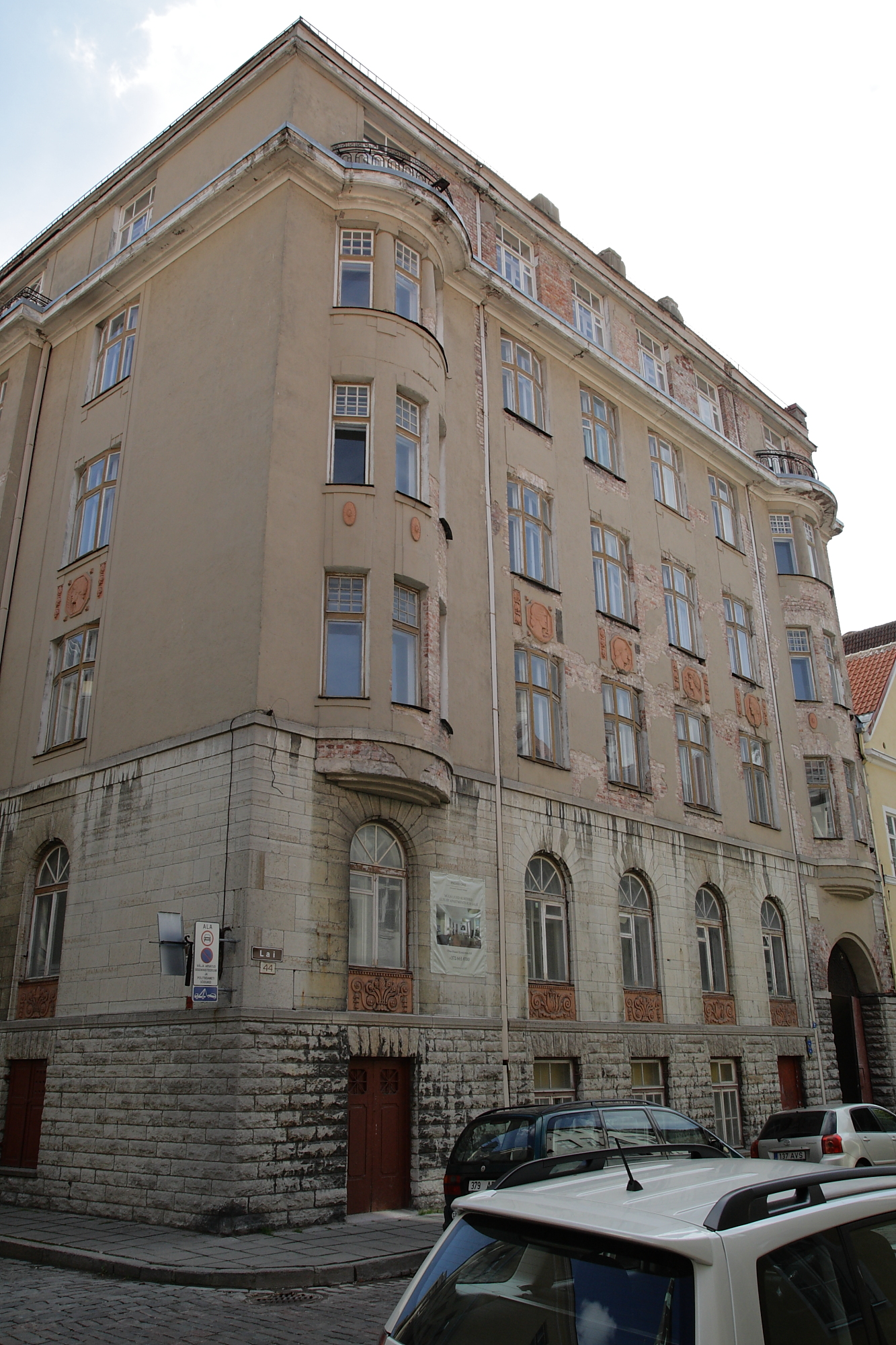
Pagari 1 (KGB Prison Cells), Tallinn

The KGB Prison Cells (Estonian: KGB Vangikongid) are former prison cells which were used by the KGB in Tallinn, Estonia. The building, known as Pagari 1, also housed the Estonian Provisional Government in March 1918 and the Estonian Ministry of War from 1920-1940.

== History ==
=== Pre-Soviet era ===
Pagari 1, when built in 1912, was intended as a residential building. However, in March 1918, the building housed the Estonian Provisional Government. Furthermore, the Estonian War of Independence (1918–1920) was coordinated from Pagari 1. From 1920 until 1940, it housed the Estonian Ministry of War.

=== Soviet occupation ===
For almost half a century, Pagari 1 housed the headquarters of the ESSR's People's Commissariat of Internal Affairs, or the NKVD, later known as the KGB. During this time, its cellars were used as prison cells. It also housed an interrogation room.

=== 1991- ===
Nowadays, the building has regained its residential purpose, though the basement of the building is used as a museum.

== Museum ==
The museum is located in the basement of the building. The museum has one permanent exhibition, ‘History of the KGB House’, and regularly hosts other temporary exhibitions. The museum consists of two corridors, six prison cells and one solitary confinement cell.

‘History of the KGB House’ speaks primarily of the history during the buildings' use by the KGB/NKVD .
