= Martin Kukk =

Estonian politician

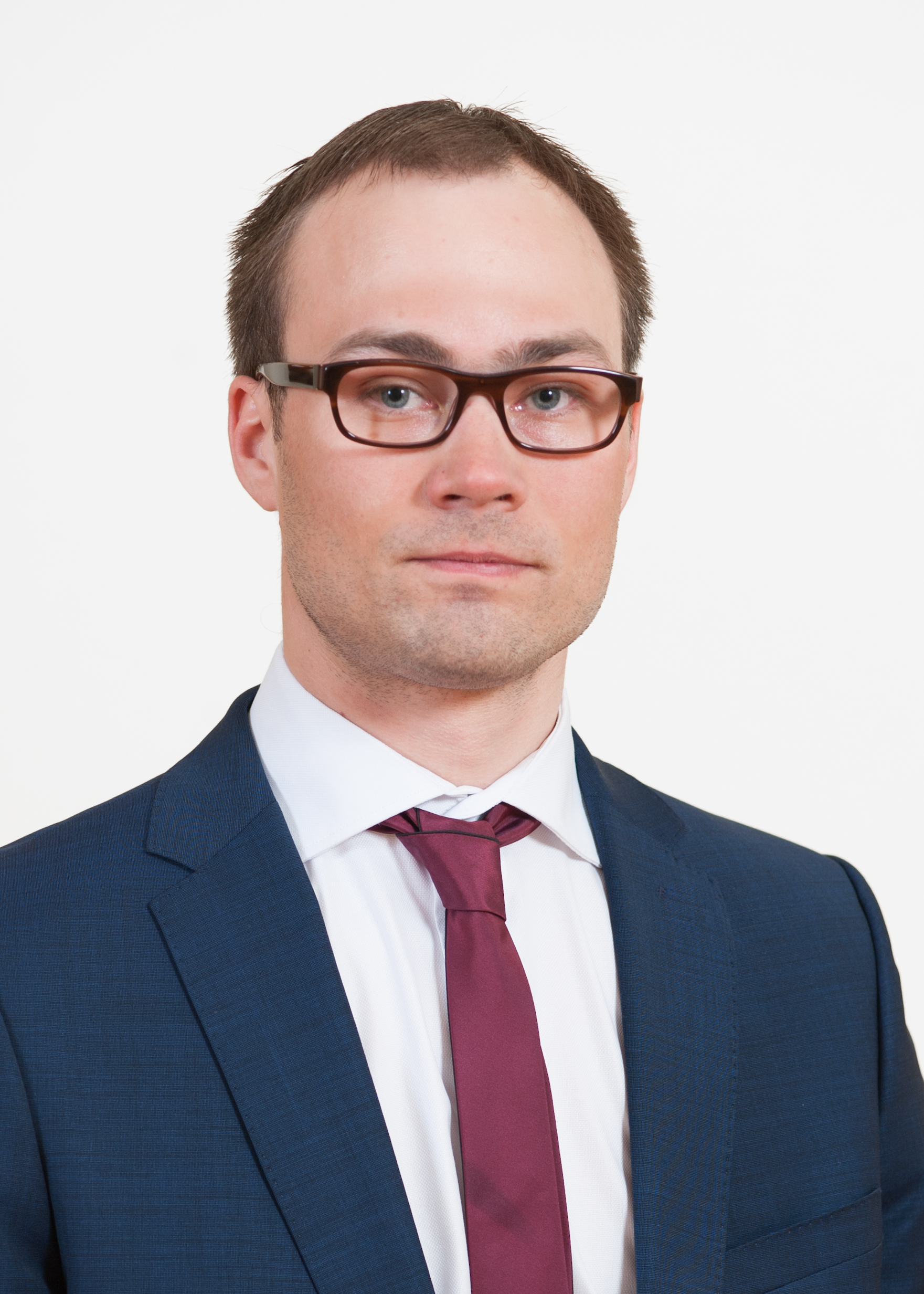
Martin Kukk (2015)

Martin Kukk (born 15 August 1987 in Rakvere) is an Estonian entrepreneur and politician. He was a member of the XIII Riigikogu.

In 2013, he graduated from Estonian Academy of Security Sciences, studying taxation.

Since 2007, he has been a member of the Estonian Reform Party. From 6 April 2011 to 15 January 2016, Kukk was Secretary General of the Reform Party.
