= 1936 Estonian National Assembly referendum =

1936 Estonian elections to convene National Assembly

23–25 February 1936
- Should the Riigikogu write a new constitution?

Results
Choice	Votes	%
Yes	474,218	76.11%
No	148,824	23.89%
Valid votes	623,042	99.02%
Invalid or blank votes	6,175	0.98%
Total votes	629,217	100.00%
Registered voters/turnout	759,338	82.86%

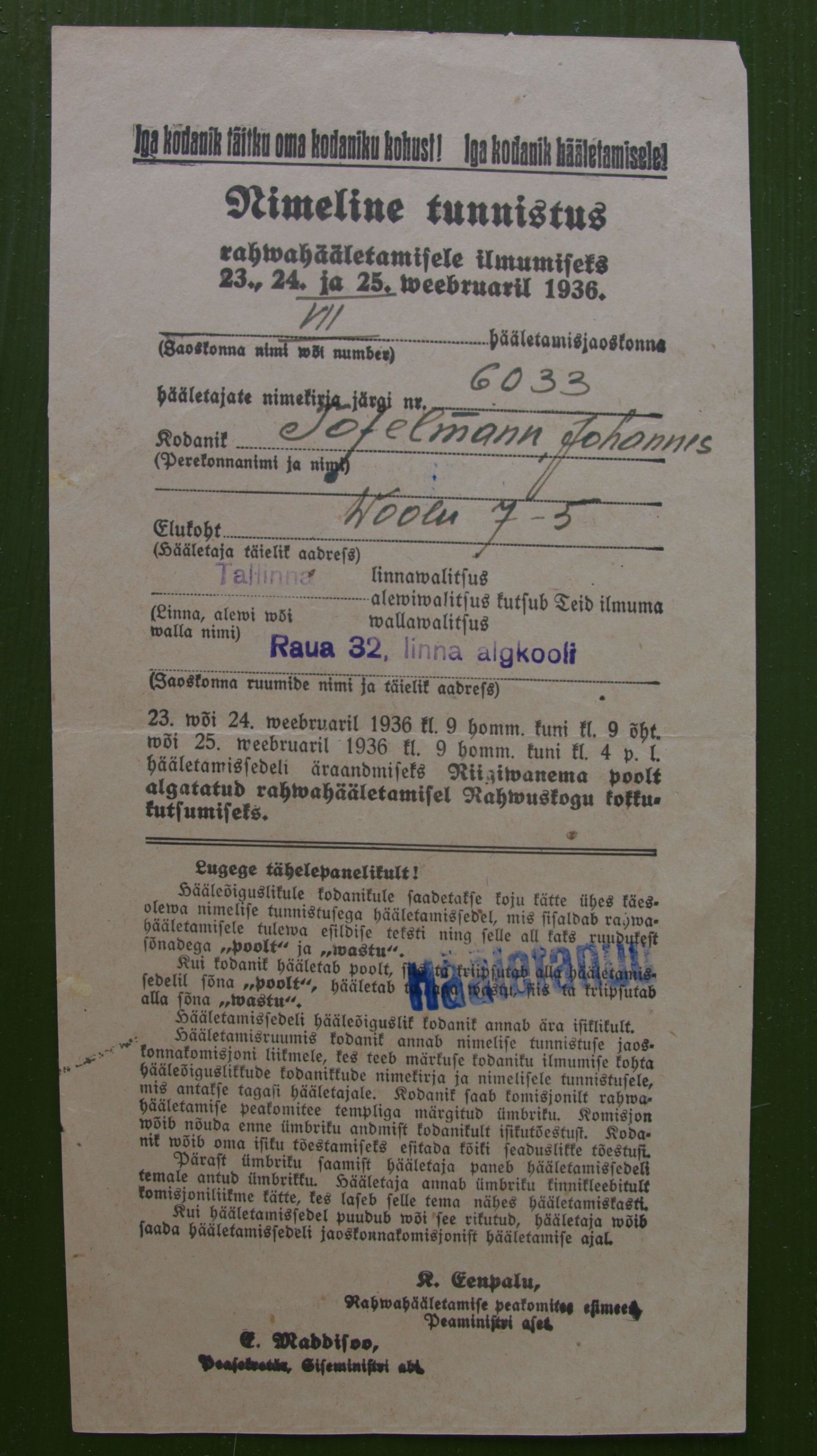
1936 referendum certificate

A referendum on convening a National Assembly to draft a new constitution was held in Estonia between 23 and 25 February 1936. It was approved by 76.1% of voters with an 82.9% turnout. Elections to the National Assembly were held in December.

== Results ==
Choice	Votes	%
For	474,218	76.1
Against	148,824	23.9
Invalid/blank votes	6,175	–
Total	629,217	100
Registered voters/turnout	759,338	82.9
Source: Nohlen & Stöver
