= Vaps Movement =

Political party in Estonia

Union of Participants in the Estonian War of Independence Eesti Vabadussõjalaste Liit
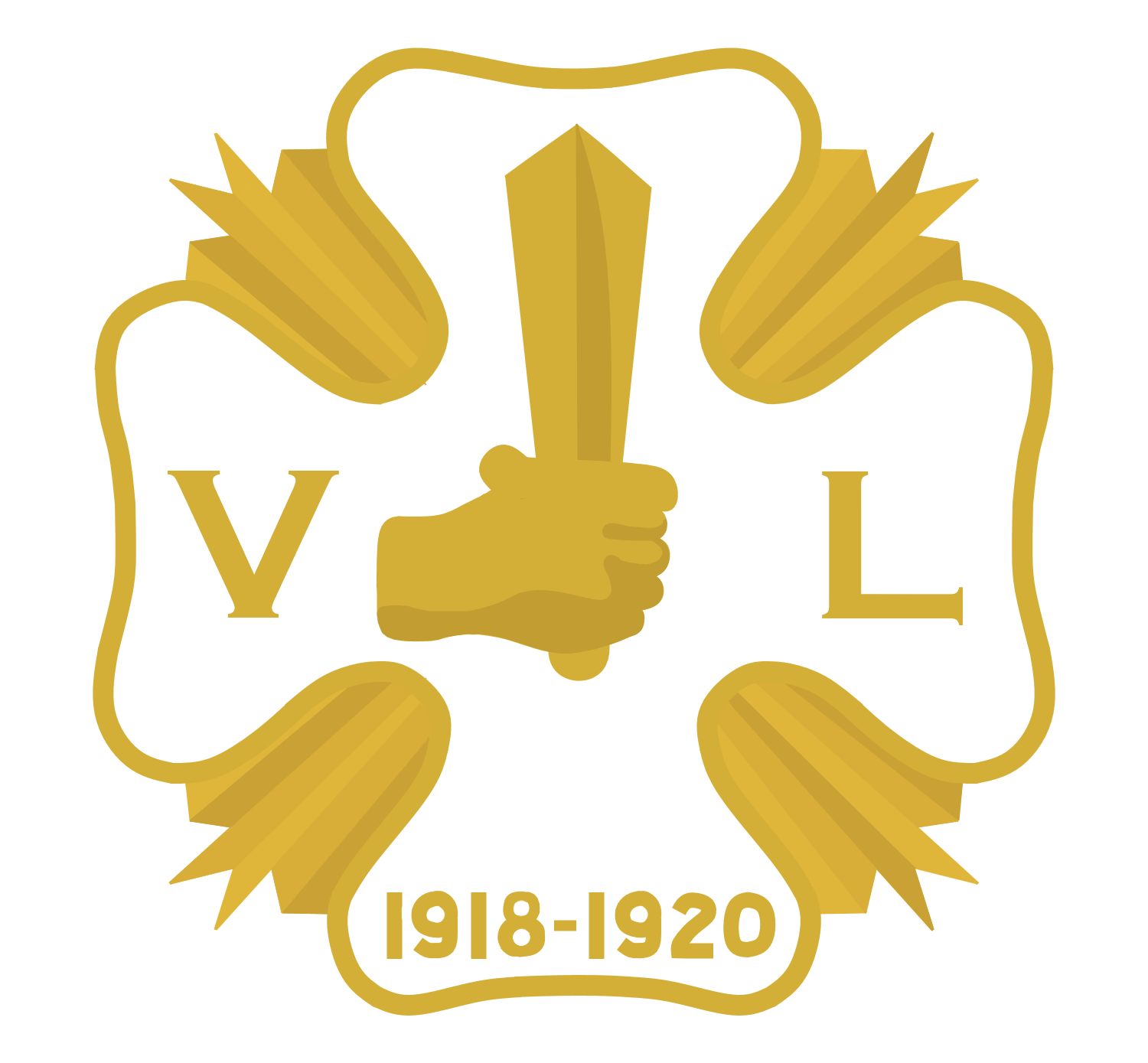
- Vapsid logo
- Leader: Andres Larka and Artur Sirk
- Founded: 1929
- Banned: December 1935
- Paramilitary wing: Korrapidajate Üksused
- Ideology: Anti-communism; Fascism; Estonian nationalism Right-wing populism
- Political position: Far-right
- Seats in cities (1934): +40%

The Vaps Movement, officially known as the Union of Participants in the Estonian War of Independence (Estonian: Eesti Vabadussõjalaste Keskliit, later Eesti Vabadussõjalaste Liit), was a far-right and authoritarian Estonian political organization, whose members were commonly called Vaps (vabadussõjalased, or colloquially vapsid; singular: vaps). Founded in 1929, born out of associations of veterans of the Estonian War of Independence, it emerged as a radical right-wing popular movement. The leaders of this association were Andres Larka (formal figurehead and presidential candidate) and Artur Sirk.

== History ==
The Vaps Movement was an anti-communist organisation led by former military officers, and most of its base were veterans of the 1918–1920 Estonian War of Independence. Early support for the movement came from campaigns to financially uplift Estonian veterans, and redistribute land previously held by the Baltic German nobility. The organisation advocated a more authoritarian and nationalist government in Estonia. The organisation welcomed Hitler's rise to power, though they later tried to distance themselves from Nazism. The league rejected racial ideology and openly criticized the Nazi persecution of Jews and did not adopt a goal of territorial expansion. However, Sirk also made antisemitic statements and the movement rejected potential support of the Jews because they are "dirty". Võitlus did occasionally attack Jews as conspirators against the movement. Vaps also had a paramilitary wing called Korrapidajate Üksused created after Socialists disrupted a Vaps meeting. The paramilitary wing was commanded by Captain Heinrich-Balduin Dunkel and members were expected to fight to the death.

They wore a black beret as their uniform headgear, and used the Roman salute. Moderate members such as Johan Pitka gradually left the organisation. The organisation issued its own newspaper, Võitlus ('The Struggle').

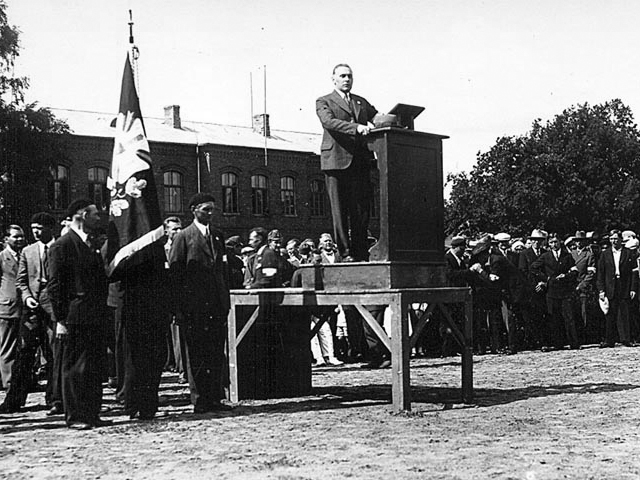
Vaps Movement meeting in Pärnu, Artur Sirk speaking

The movement strongly supported constitutional reform that would enable a strong president to address national problems. Estonian patriots began advocating such a change in the mid-1920s. Estonia's 1920 constitution permitted citizens to petition to change laws and establish new ones, akin to Switzerland. If at least 25 thousand citizens were to give their signatures to put a draft law to a referendum, a referendum had to take place and the changes were to be implemented if passed. In October 1933 the Estonian government was forced to allow the Vaps movement to put forward its own referendum on constitutional reform, after watered down centre-right proposals failed to win support. This was approved by 72.7 percent of the voters. The organization was banned by the government of Jaan Tõnisson (who opposed the constitutional reform) under a state of emergency imposed before the referendum, but after this the organization was re-established and became more patriotic. The league spearheaded replacement of the parliamentary system with a presidential form of government and laid the groundwork for an April 1934 presidential election, which it expected to win. The League won absolute majorities in local elections in the three largest cities at the beginning of 1934, but not in the most rural self-governments nor small towns and boroughs.

During the 1934 Estonian coup d'état, aimed to prevent the Vaps movement from winning the presidential elections, the recently elected constitutional "State Elder" (head of government and head of state) Konstantin Päts declared a state of emergency in the whole country on 12 March 1934 (in certain parts, this had been in effect since 1918). The Vaps Movement was disbanded and its leading figures were arrested in December 1935.

On 6 May 1936, 150 members of the league went on trial; 143 of them were convicted and sentenced to lengthy terms of imprisonment. They were granted an amnesty and freed in 1938, by which time the league had lost most of its popular support. By 1 January 1938, a new constitution took effect and new parliament was elected in February 1938. The new constitution combined a strong President with a partly elected and partly appointed, officially non-partisan, Parliament.

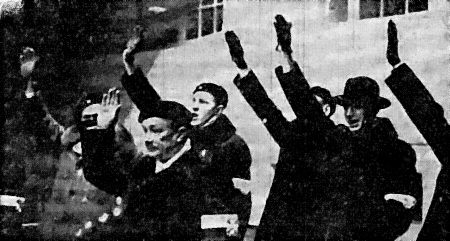
General Andres Larka speaking 1933.

The movement maintained good relations with Finnish fascist movements such as the Lapua Movement, Patriotic People's Movement and Academic Karelia Society.

As of 2019, the Vaps movement had no known active members. In 2009, Jüri Liim reportedly submitted a formal application to restore the original Vaps Movement. The application was not successful, and the Vaps Movement has not been legalised in Estonia.

== See also ==
- Estonian War of Independence
- History of Estonia
- Lapua Movement
- List of political parties in Estonia
