= Andres Larka =

Estonian politician (1879–1943)

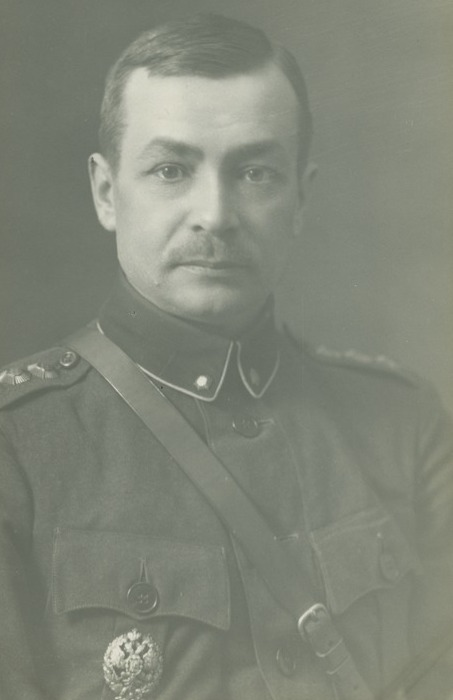
Andres Larka in 1920

Andres Larka VR I/1 (5 March 1879 Pilistvere (now Põhja-Sakala Parish), Kreis Fellin – 8 January 1943 Malmyzh, Kirov, Soviet Union) was an Estonian military commander during the Estonian War of Independence and a politician.

In 1902 he graduated from Vilnius Military Academy. Larka participated in the Russo-Japanese War and graduated from the Imperial Nicholas Military Academy in 1912. He participated in World War I fighting on the Eastern front against the German Empire, including fighting in East Prussia, Poland and Romania.

Larka became the first Minister of War of Republic of Estonia; in March he achieved rank of Major General. In 1918, during the German occupation, he participated in organising the Defence League. After the start of the Estonian Liberation War in 1918, Larka soon moved from position of Minister of War to Chief of Staff. In February 1919 he became the Undersecretary of the Minister of War and held that position to the beginning of 1925. In that position his job was to organize mobilization and actions of reserve units. After the war he also organized demobilization. He retired in 1925 because of health issues. In 1930 he became official leader of the League of Liberators and was their candidate in the April 1934 presidential elections. But on 12 March 1934, as it seemed likely that Larka would be elected, Konstantin Päts and Johan Laidoner made a coup d'état in order to prevent him from winning the elections. The elections were postponed indefinitely, Larka and about 400 of his closest supporters were imprisoned and authoritarian rule was established. Larka was in prison twice (1934-1935 and 1935-1937). In 1940 the Soviet occupation authorities arrested Larka; he died in imprisonment in 1943.

Larka is recipient of the Latvian military Order of Lāčplēsis, 2nd class.

== See also ==
- Estonian War of Independence
- Freikorps in the Baltic
- League of Liberators

Preceded by none	Minister of War; 1918	Succeeded by Konstantin Päts
