= Jaan Maide =

Estonian general (1896–1945)

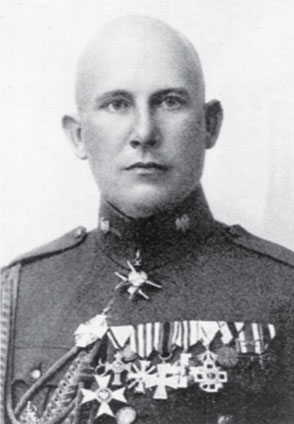
- Born: 30 May 1896; Vana-Kariste, Kreis Pernau, Governorate of Livonia, Russian Empire
- Died: 10 August 1945 (aged 49) Moscow, Soviet Union
- Allegiance: Russian Empire; Estonia
- Branch: Imperial Russian Army; Estonian Army; Wehrmacht
- Service years: 1915–1918 (Imperial Russian Army); 1918–1940, 1944 (Estonian Army); 1941–1944 (Wehrmacht)
- Rank: Major General
- Commands: 1st Company, 6th Regiment (1918–1920); Chief of Staff of the Estonian Defence League (1927–1934); Armoured Train Regiment (1934–1935); Chief of Staff of the Estonian Defence League (1935–1940); 4th Division (1940); Commander-in-Chief of the Estonian Military (1944)
- Conflicts: World War I Estonian War of Independence; World War II
- Awards: Cross of Liberty; Order of Lāčplēsis; Order of the Estonian Red Cross; Order of the Cross of the Eagle; Order of the White Star

Jaan Maide, VR II/3 (30 May 1896 – 10 August 1945) was a senior Estonian Army officer who fought in World War I, the Estonian War of Independence and World War II. He was appointed Commander-in-Chief of the Estonian Military by Otto Tief's government in 1944.

== Early life ==
Maide was born on 30 May 1896, in Vana-Kariste to Johann and Liso Maide.

== Military career ==
Maide was drafted into the Imperial Russian Army in 1915. He graduated from a commissioned officer's academy in Kyiv as an ensign in 1916, and served with the Latvian Riflemen regiment from 1917 until 1918.

Following the Estonian Declaration of Independence, Maide joined the newly formed Estonian Army, where he was appointed commander of the 1st Company of the 6th Regiment. He commanded his unit during the Estonian War of Independence, and was promoted to lieutenant on 12 February 1920.

After the war, Maide stayed in the military. He finished General Staff officers' course in 1923, and was promoted to captain. From 1923 until 1927, he served as a general staff officer. In 1927, he was appointed Chief of Staff of the Estonian Defence League (Kaitseliit). On 24 February 1933, he was promoted to colonel. From 30 November 1934 until 30 November 1935, he commanded the Armoured Train Regiment, before returning to his former position as the Chief of Staff of the Estonian Defence League. On 1 February 1940, he was appointed commander of the newly established 4th Division, based in Viljandi.

Maide survived the first Soviet occupation. During the German occupation of Estonia in World War II, Maide was Chief of Staff, and later Commander of the Omakaitse (Home Guard), a collaborationist militia based on the Estonian Defence League.

In wake of the German retreat and the Soviet offensive in September 1944, Otto Tief's government made one last attempt to restore Estonian independence. On 18 September 1944, Maide was appointed Commander-in-Chief of the Estonian Military, and promoted to major general on 21 September. Despite his attempts to reform the army, the plan to defend Estonia failed. Tallinn fell on 22 September 1944, and Maide himself was captured in Munalaskme on 24 October 1944.

== Death ==
Maide was transported to the Butyrka prison in Moscow and executed on 10 August 1945.

== Awards and decorations ==
Estonian awards and decorations
Cross of Liberty, 2nd Class 3rd Rank
Order of the White Star, 3rd Class
Order of the Cross of the Eagle, 3rd Class
Order of the Estonian Red Cross, 2nd Class
Foreign awards
Order of Lāčplēsis, 3rd Class (Latvia)

== Promotions ==
Promotions
Rank	Date
Lieutenant	12 February 1920
Second Captain	27 July 1920
Captain	22 February 1923
Major	26 November 1924
Lieutenant Colonel	24 February 1928
Colonel	24 February 1933
Major General	21 September 1944

Military offices
Preceded by Johan Laidoner	Commander-in-Chief of the Estonian Military; 1944	Succeeded by Aleksander Einseln as Commander of the Estonian Defence Forces
