= Johan Laidoner =

Estonian general (1884–1953)

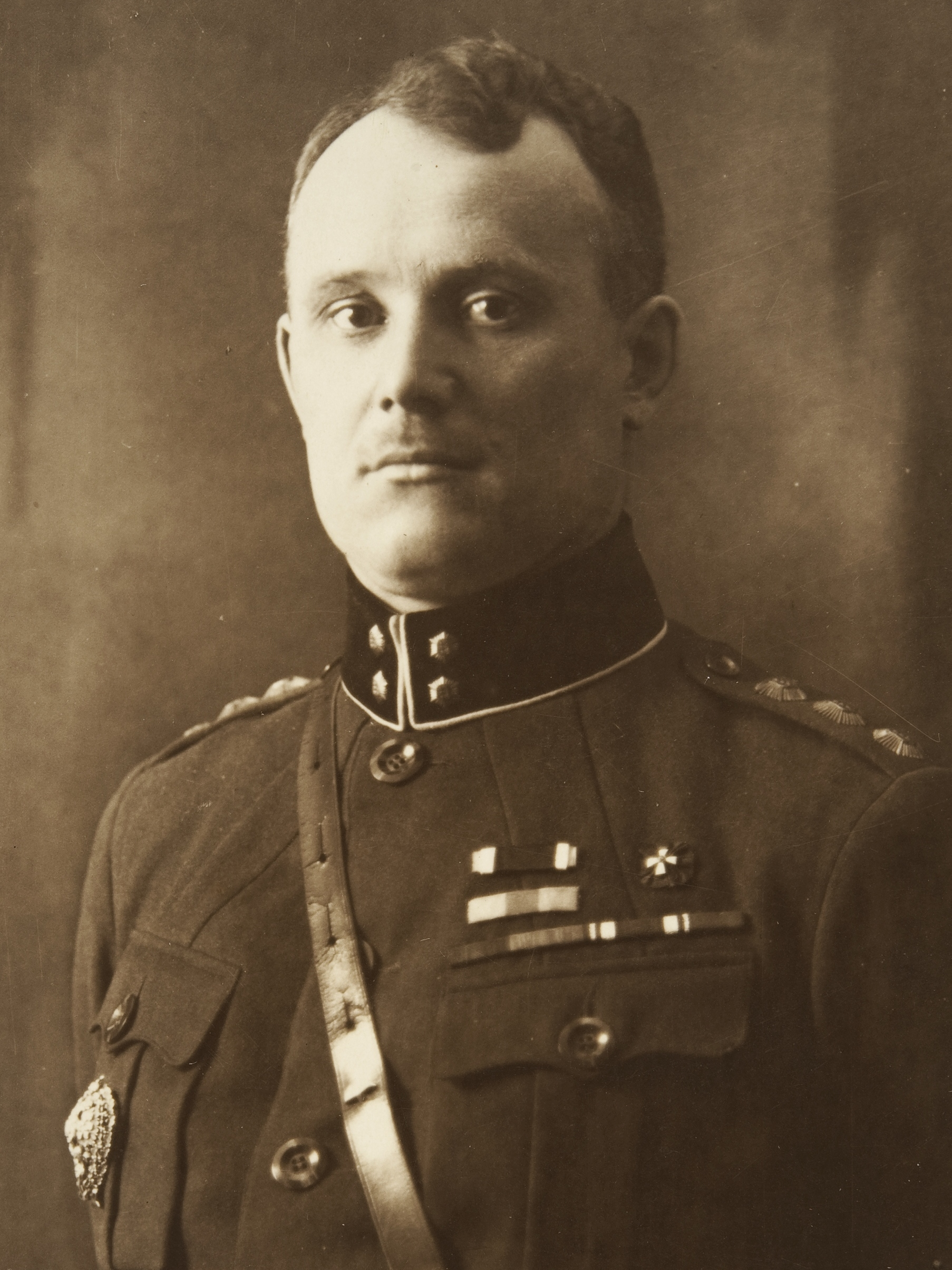
- Laidoner during the Estonian War of Independence.
- Born: 12 February 1884; Vardja, Governorate of Livonia, Russian Empire
- Died: 13 March 1953 (aged 69); Vladimir, Russian SFSR, Soviet Union
- Spouse: Maria Kruszewska (m. 1911)
- Military career
- Allegiance: Russian Empire; Estonia
- Branch: Imperial Russian Army; Estonian Army
- Service years: 1901–1920; 1924–1925; 1934–1940
- Rank: Kindral (General)
- Commands: Commander‑in‑Chief of the Estonian Armed Forces
- Conflicts: World War I Estonian War of Independence
- Awards: Cross of Liberty, 1st Class 1st Rank; Cross of Liberty, 3rd Class 1st Rank; Order of the White Star; Order of the Cross of the Eagle, 1st Class; Order of the Estonian Red Cross, 1st Class

Signature
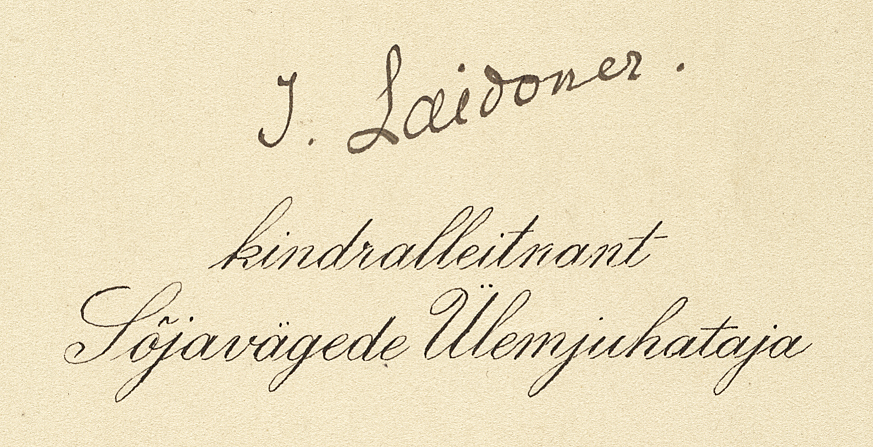

Johan Laidoner (12 February [O.S. 31 January] 1884 – 13 March 1953) was an Estonian general and statesman. He served as Commander‑in‑Chief of the Estonian Armed Forces during the Estonian War of Independence and was among the most influential people in the Estonian politics between the world wars.

Born in Viiratsi, Kreis Fellin, Governorate of Livonia, Laidoner joined the Imperial Russian Army in 1901 and fought in World War I. Following the Russian Revolution in 1917, he commanded the Estonian national units of the Russian army. In 1918, the Estonian Provisional Government appointed him commander-in-chief of the armed forces of the newly independent Republic of Estonia.

After the Estonian War of Independence, he served as a member of the parliament (Riigikogu) from 1920 to 1929. He was once again appointed commander-in-chief during the 1924 Communist coup attempt, and then again from 1934 to 1940. After the Soviet occupation in 1940, he was arrested and deported to Russia, where he died in prison in 1953.

== Early life and career ==
Johan Laidoner was born on Raba estate in Vardja, Viiratsi Parish, to the farmhand Jaak Laidoner (1854–1911) and his wife Mari (née Saarsen; 1851–1938) as the first of four sons. He studied at Viiratsi Elementary School and finished his basic education at Viljandi Town School in 1900. As Laidoner's parents were poor, he could not continue his studies and voluntarily joined the Imperial Russian Army. From 1901 to 1902, he served in the 110th Kama Infantry Regiment, based in Kovno (now Kaunas, Lithuania), and went on to study at the Infantry Officer School in Vilna (Vilnius) from 1902 to 1905. He graduated top of his class in April 1905 and was promoted to the rank of sub-lieutenant. He was then sent to serve in the 13th Yerevan Grenadier Regiment, which was then stationed in Manglisi, Georgia. From 1905 to 1909, he held various positions in the regiment, eventually becoming company deputy commander. In 1908, he was promoted to lieutenant.

From 1909 to 1912, Laidoner studied at the Imperial Nicholas Military Academy in Saint Petersburg, graduating with a 1st grade diploma. On 30 October 1911, while studying in Saint Petersburg, Laidoner married Maria Skarbek-Kruszewska, a descendant of Polish nobility, whom he had met earlier in Vilnius. The couple had a son, Michael (also called Mihhail and nicknamed Miša) on 21 March 1913. Michael Laidoner died on 21 April 1928, aged fifteen, from a self-inflicted gunshot wound to the head while alone in his bedroom. His father was away on business in Kohila. The cause of death was officially ruled accidental, however later statements from his mother and classmates implied that he had been suicidal prior to his death. After Michael's death, the Laidoners adopted Maria's nephew, Aleksei Kruszewski.

Upon his graduation in 1912, Laidoner was promoted to the rank of staff captain and sent back to his regiment. In the following year, he was appointed to the General Staff and was dispatched to serve for one year as company commander in the 1st Caucasus Rifle Regiment. He then served at the Staff of the Caucasus Military District.

== World War I ==
At the outbreak of World War I, Laidoner served as staff aide of the 3rd Caucasus Army Corps. On 26 November 1914, he was promoted to captain. In March 1915, Laidoner was appointed to the senior staff of the 21st Infantry Division of the same corps. In October 1915, he was made aide to the commander of the intelligence department of the Staff of the Western Front and on 15 August 1916, Laidoner was promoted to the rank of Podpolkovnik (lieutenant colonel). From March to September 1917, he served as staff commander of the 1st Caucasus Grenadier Division and from October to November 1917, as staff commander of the 62nd Infantry Division.

On 5 January 1918, Laidoner was appointed commander of the newly formed 1st Estonian Division. On 18 February 1918, the negotiations over the Treaty of Brest-Litovsk broke down and German forces, who had already captured Estonian islands, landed on the mainland. On the following day, Laidoner resigned from his post as division commander and left for Russia. On 24 February 1918, Estonia declared independence, but was subsequently occupied by Germany.

== Estonian War of Independence ==
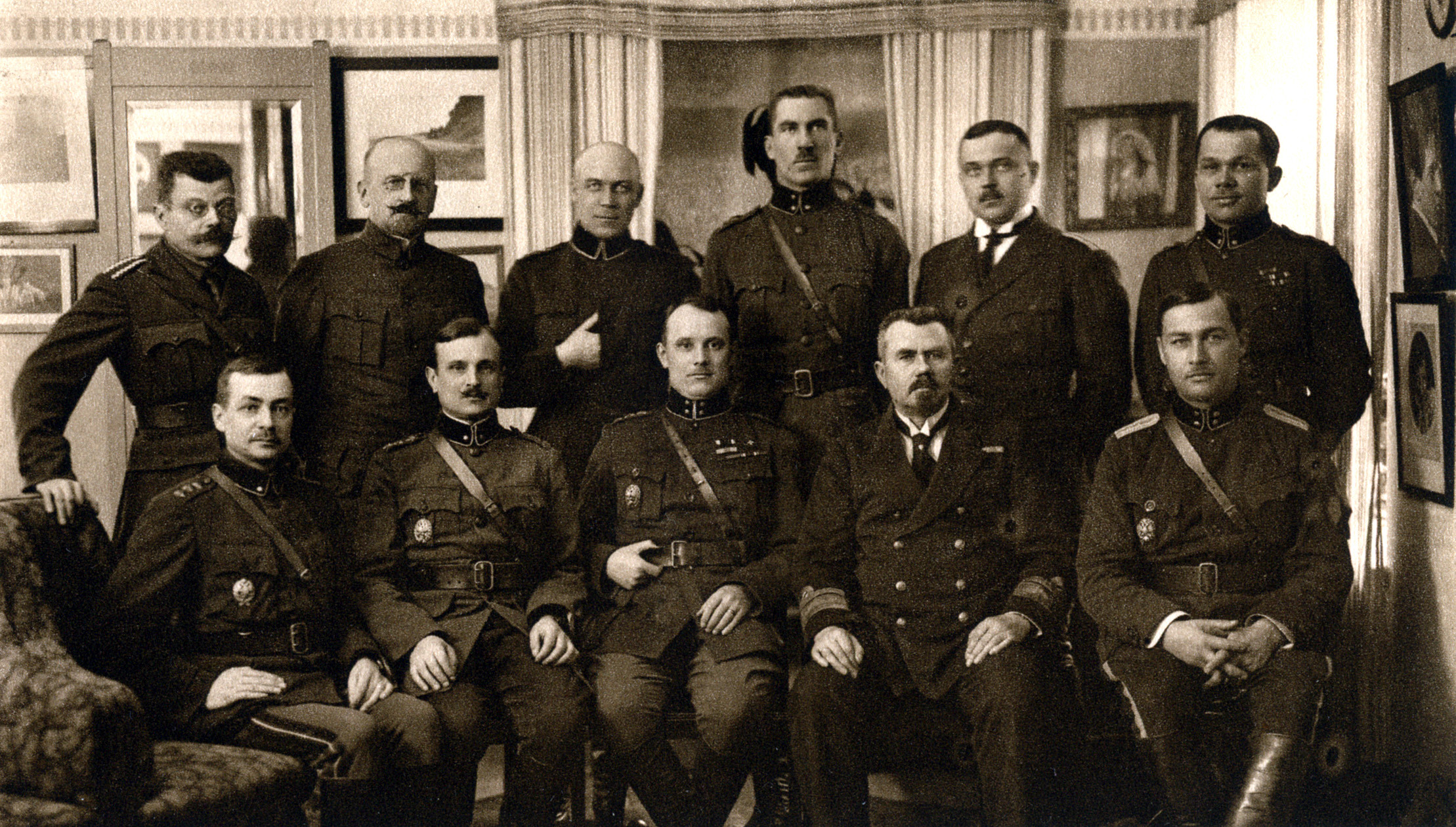
Laidoner with senior commanders of the Estonian Armed Forces in 1920. From upper left: General Major Ernst Põdder, Dr. Arthur Lossmann, General Major Aleksander Tõnisson, Colonel Karl Parts, Colonel Viktor Puskar, Colonel Jaan Rink. From bottom left: General Major Andres Larka, General Major Jaan Soots, Commander in Chief General Lieutenant Johan Laidoner, Admiral Johan Pitka and Colonel Rudolf Reimann

On 4 April 1918, the Estonian Provisional Government promoted Laidoner, then still residing in Petrograd, to the rank of Polkovnik (colonel). Following the German capitulation on 11 November 1918, the Soviet Red Army invaded Estonia on 28 November, marking the beginning of the Estonian War of Independence. On 30 November, Laidoner left Petrograd and arrived in Tallinn on 8 December. The provisional government first appointed him chief of staff on 14 December, and then on 23 December, commander-in-chief of the Estonian Armed Forces.

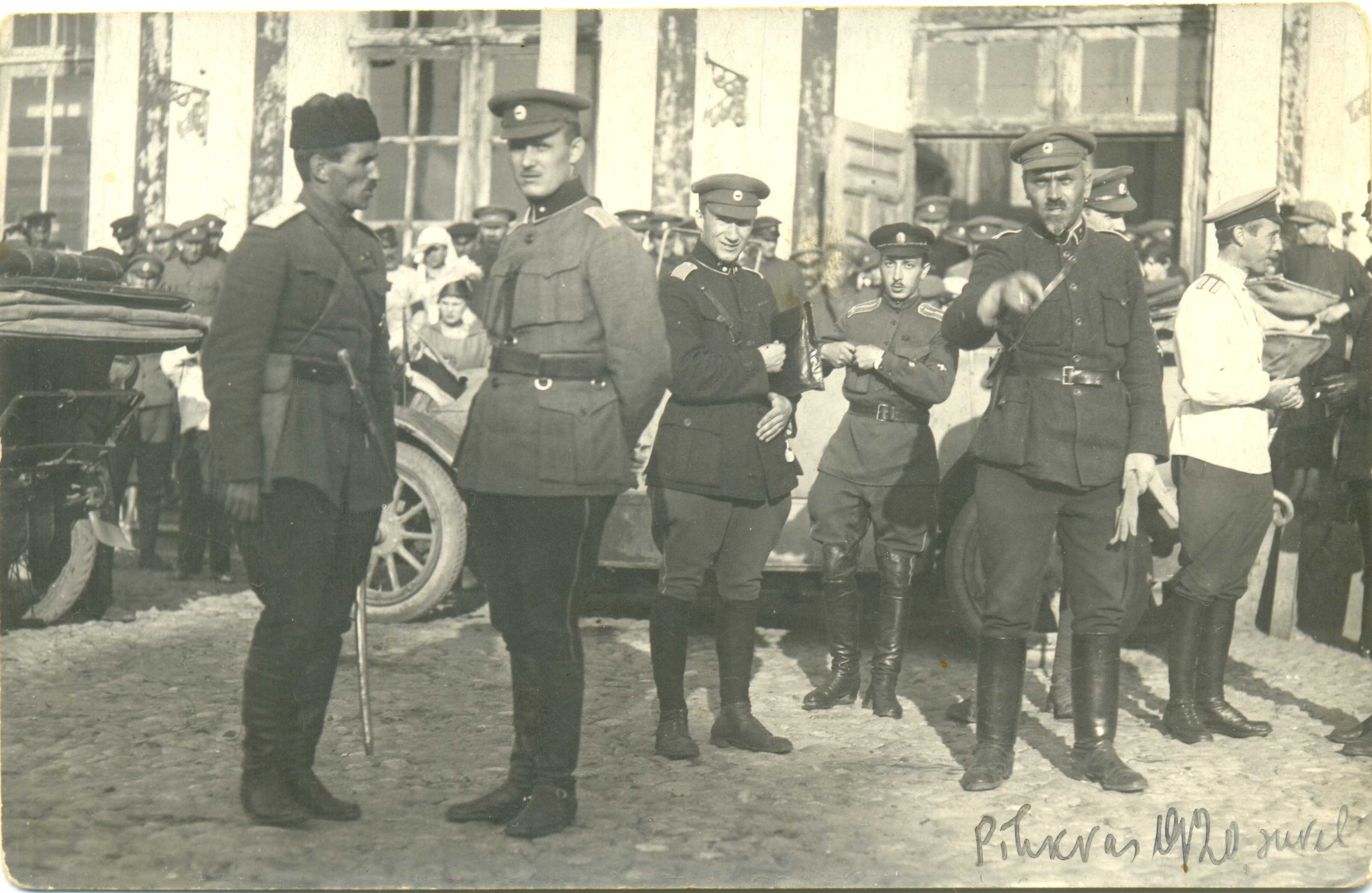
The highest command of Estonian Army visited general Stanisław Bułak-Bałachowicz's forces in Pskov on 31 May 1919; Bułak-Bałachowicz (left) talks with Laidoner.

On 1 January 1919, the Estonian Army had just over 13,000 men, with 5,700 of them facing 8,000 Soviets on the Viru Front. In the first days of January, the Estonian forces managed to halt the Soviet advance at the Valkla-Kehra line and on 3 January, Laidoner launched a counter-offensive with 1st Division, supported by Finnish volunteers and armoured trains. Within 11 days, the 1st Division advanced 200 kilometres east, while the 2nd Division moved against the Soviet forces in Southern Estonia. Following the liberation of Tartu and Narva, he was promoted to the rank of major general on 20 January 1919. On Estonia's first independence day on 24 February 1919, Laidoner reported that the Soviet forces have been driven out of Estonia, as well as capturing over 6,000 men and 40 guns.

Laidoner had a crucial role in organizing and training the army in a very short time as well as establishing an effective command structure within the armed forces. Learning from his experience with trench warfare in World War I and due to the limited size of the forces available to him, Laidoner chose to achieve crucial victories – capturing strategically important roads and railway stations – with smaller and more mobile battalion- and company-sized units, supported by armoured trains and armoured cars. After the end of the war, Laidoner was promoted to lieutenant general on 21 March 1920, before resigning as commander‑in‑chief and retiring from active service on 26 March 1920.

== Post-war career ==
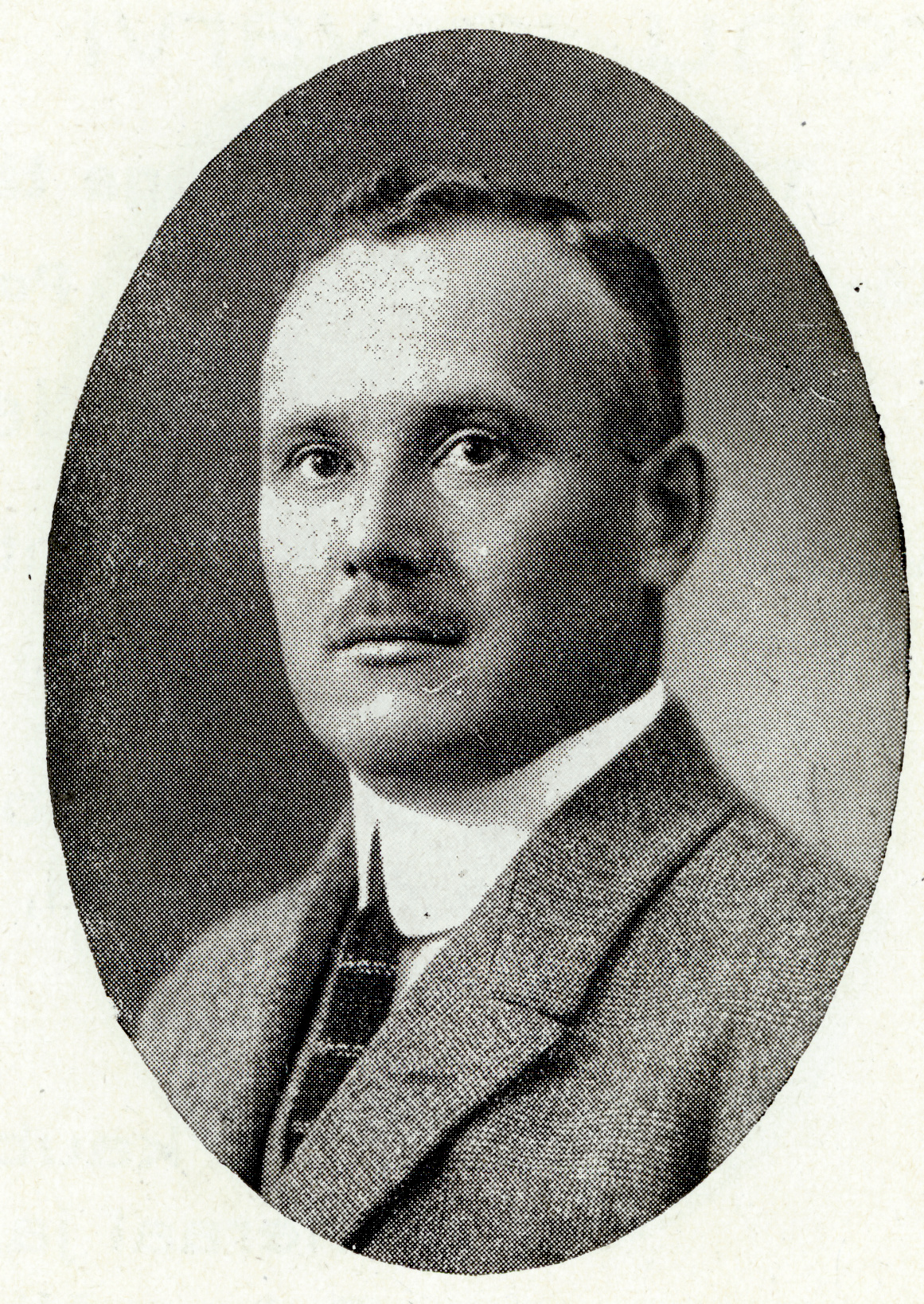
Laidoner as a member of parliament.

After the war, Laidoner was a member of the Riigikogu (Parliament of Estonia) and from 1920 to 1929 as a member of the conservative Farmers' Assemblies. He served as the chairman of the Foreign Affairs Committee and was part of the Estonian delegation in the General Assembly of the League of Nations from 1922 to 1929, where he was known for his isolationist stance.

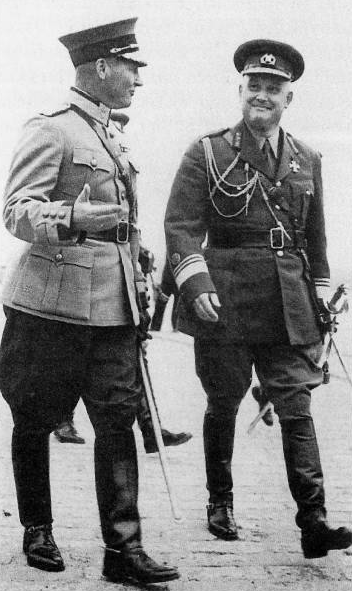
Laidoner and Hugo Österman, commander of the Finnish Defence Forces, in 1938. Estonia and Finland had a secret military pact.

On 1 December 1924, the Estonian Communists, together with assault groups sent from the Soviet Union, attempted a coup d'état. The government called an emergency meeting during which martial law was declared and Laidoner was appointed commander‑in‑chief of the armed forces. Although the actual coup attempt was over in five hours, the pursuit of coupists continued and the situation remained tense for several weeks. On 8 January 1925, after the martial law was abolished, Laidoner resigned as commander‑in‑chief and left military service once again.

In 1925, Laidoner was commissioned by the League of Nations to head a special mission to Iraq, investigating the allegations made against Turkey regarding the mistreatment and deportations of Christians in the Mosul region. The report Laidoner's committee submitted played an important role in demarcating the border between Turkey and Iraq.

On 12 March 1934, the State Elder Konstantin Päts declared martial law and appointed Laidoner commander‑in‑chief of the armed forces. The aim of declaring martial law was to halt the political rise of the Vaps Movement and their potential success in the upcoming presidential elections. Together with Päts and Kaarel Eenpalu, the Minister of the Interior, Laidoner established an authoritarian rule, disbanding political parties and limiting free speech, the so-called "Era of Silence". Laidoner remained commander-in-chief of the armed forces and oversaw national defence politics. His reforms included a large-scale weapons and equipment modernization program, expanding the military via conscription, and introduction of military training in universities. On 1 January 1938, a new constitution was enacted, which saw the creation of a bicameral Rahvuskogu (National Assembly), consisting of the Chamber of Deputies and the National Council. As the commander‑in‑chief, Laidoner became an ex officio member of the National Council. On 24 February 1939, he was promoted to the rank of general.

== Soviet occupation, arrest and death ==
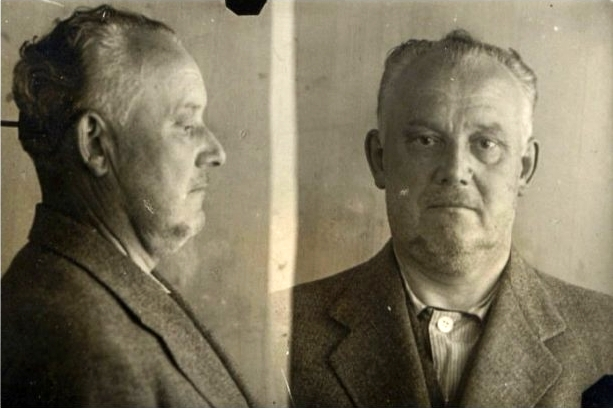
1941 mugshot of Laidoner after his arrest in 1940

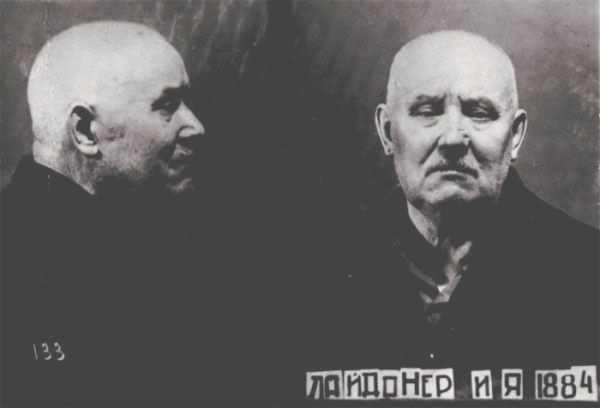
Last known photo of Laidoner in Soviet prison (1952)

On 17 June 1940, the Soviet Union occupied Estonia. Laidoner was officially removed from his position as the commander‑in‑chief on 22 June 1940. On 19 July, he and his wife were deported to Penza, Russia, where they lived in forced exile until the beginning of the war with Germany. On 23 June 1941, they were put under house arrest and then imprisoned on 28 June by the NKVD. In September 1942, the Laidoners were sent to the Butyrka prison in Moscow, along with Konstantin Päts and a number of former Latvian, Lithuanian and Polish statesmen and their families. From there, they were moved to a prison in Kirov, and then in Ivanovo. On 16 April 1952, Laidoner was sentenced to 25 years in prison. He was sent to Vladimir Central Prison, where he died on 13 March 1953. He was buried at the prison cemetery, but his remains have not been found.

Laidoner's adopted son Aleksei was also arrested by the NKVD. He died in Solikamsk labor camp on 26 November 1941 with chest trauma listed as the cause of death.

Maria Laidoner was released in 1954 and was allowed to return to Estonia. She died in 1978 in Jämejala, near Viljandi, and was buried in Tallinn at Siselinna Cemetery, next to her son Michael.

== Legacy ==
Laidoner's reputation in Estonia has remained controversial; although he has been hailed as a national hero for his leadership skills and success as a military commander in the War of Independence, he has been criticized for his support of Konstantin Päts and his involvement in the 1934 coup d'état as well as the surrender to the Soviet Union in 1940.

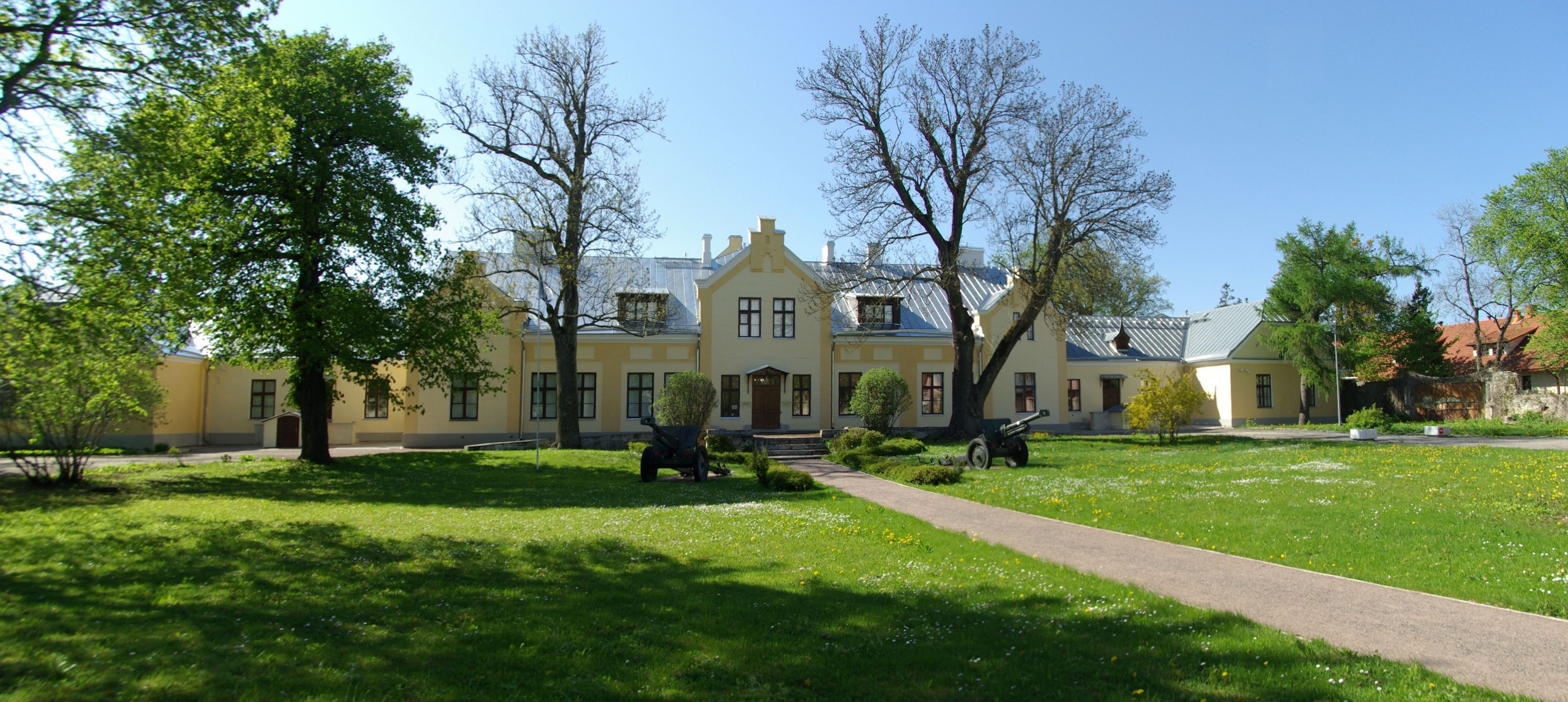
Viimsi Manor was Laidoner's summer residence. Today it is known as the Estonian War Museum.

Laidoner has a number of monuments, memorials and places named after him.

- Laidoner's memorial in his birthplace in Vardja was destroyed after the Soviet occupation in 1940 and restored in 1990.
- In 2001, the Estonian War Museum named in his honour was opened in Laidoner's former residence in Viimsi Manor.
- In 2004, an equestrian statue of General Laidoner was unveiled next to the ruins of the Viljandi Castle.
- In Viljandi, a square and a park are named after him.
- In 2009, Eesti Post released a commemorative stamp to honour Laidoner's 125th anniversary.
- Laidoner has a plaque dedicated to him in Vilnius Military Academy.
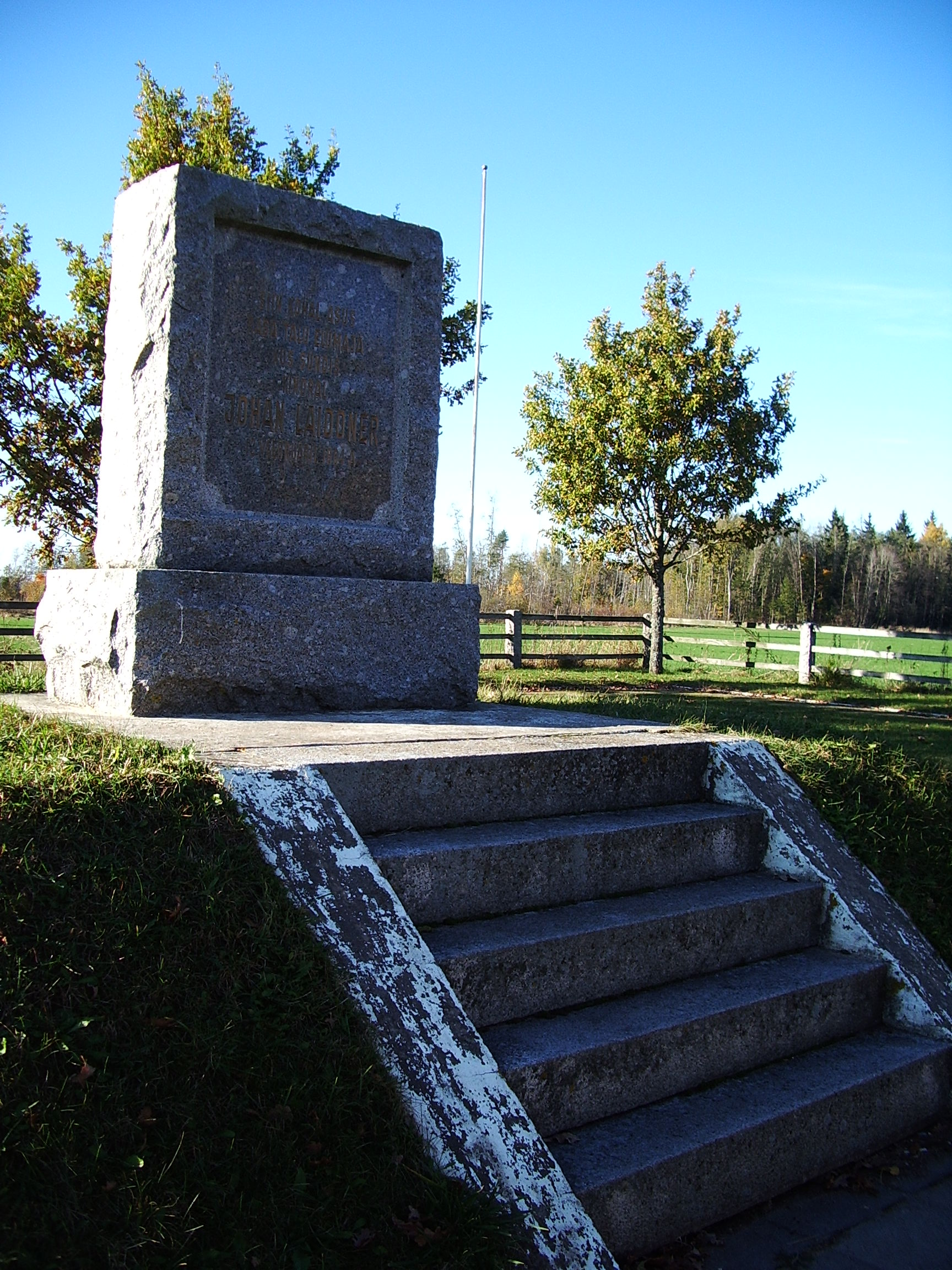
Laidoner's memorial in Vardja

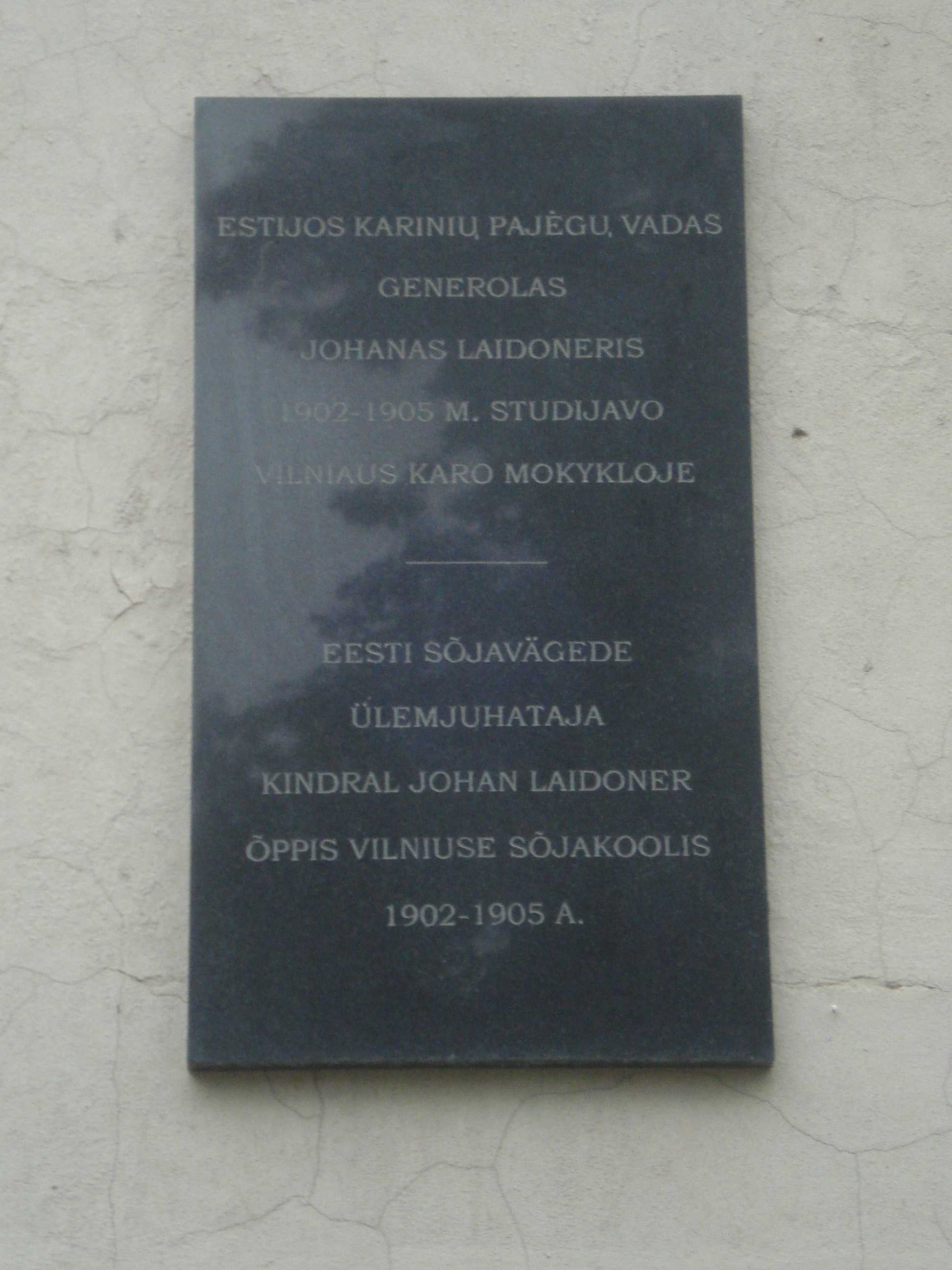
Plaque for Laidoner in Vilnius

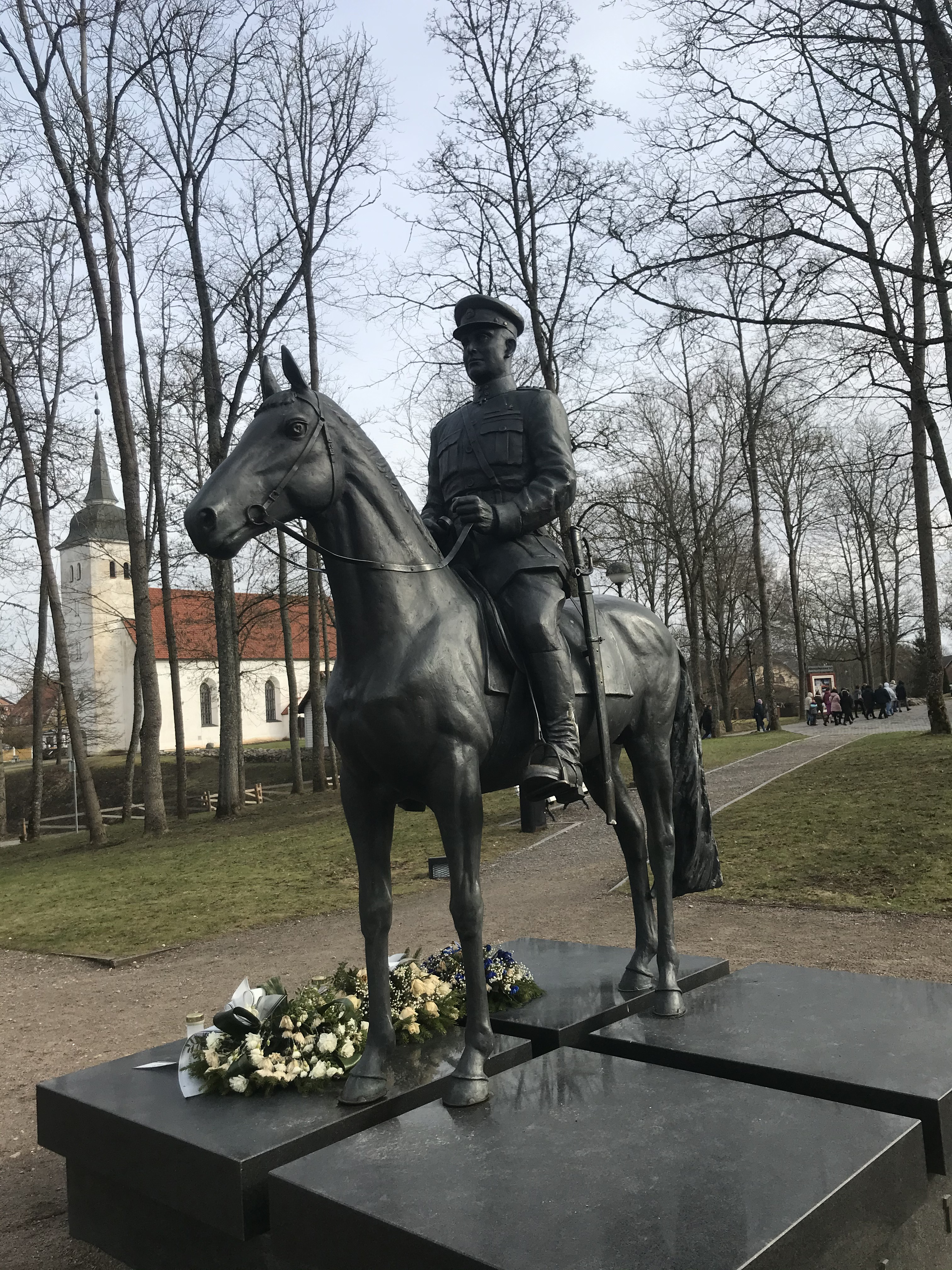
Equestrian statue of General Johan Laidoner in Viljandi

== Awards and decorations ==
Estonian awards and decorations
| Cross of Liberty, 1st Degree 1st Class |
| Cross of Liberty, 3rd Degree 1st Class |
| Order of the White Star, special sash |
| Order of the Cross of the Eagle, 1st Class |
| Order of the Estonian Red Cross, 1st Class |
Russian awards and decorations
| Order of Saint Vladimir, 4th Class |
| Order of Saint Anna, 2nd Class |
| Order of Saint Anna, 4th Class |
| Order of Saint Stanislaus, 2nd Class |
| Golden Weapon for Bravery |
Foreign awards
| Order of the White Rose of Finland, Grand Cross (Finland) |
| Legion of Honour, Commander (France) |
| German Olympic Decoration, 1st Class (Germany) |
| Order of Lāčplēsis, 1st Class (Latvia) |
| Order of Lāčplēsis, 2nd Class (Latvia) |
| Order of Lāčplēsis, 3rd Class (Latvia) |
| Order of Vytautas the Great, Grand Cross (Lithuania) |
| Order of the White Eagle (Poland) |
| Order of Virtuti Militari, 5th Class (Poland) |
| Order of Polonia Restituta, Grand Cross (Poland) |
| Order of the Sword, Grand Cross (Sweden) |
| Order of St Michael and St George, Honorary Knight Commander (United Kingdom) |

== See also ==
- Estonian War of Independence
- Gustaf Mannerheim

== Bibliography ==
- Vabariigi Ohvitseride Keskkogu (1934). Johan Laidoner – mälestusi kaasaeglasilt. Tallinn: Ühiselu.
- Deemant, Kaupo; Herodes, Priit; Lään, Irene; Lään, Tanel; Pihlak, Jaak; Pillak, Peep; Reintam, Marika; Walter, Hannes; Õun, Mati (1999). Kindral Johan Laidoner – 115 aastat sünnist. Tallinn: Tammiskilp.
- Lään, Irene; Hiio, Toomas (2008). Ühtekuuluvuse teel. Johan Laidoneri kirjad abikaasale. Tallinn: Varrak. ISBN 9789985316023.
- Pillak, Peep (1999). Johan Laidoner 12.02.1884 – 13.03.1953. Tallinn: Umara. ISBN 9985895045.
- Rosenthal, Reigo (2008). Laidoner – väejuht. Johan Laidoner kõrgema operatiivjuhi ja strateegia kujundajana. Tallinn: Argo. ISBN 978-9949-438-51-8.
- Tuisk, Mart (1938). Ülemjuhataja kindral Johan Laidoner. Vabadussõja võidurikas juht. Tallinn: Kooli-Kooperatiiv.
- Turtola, Martti (2008). Kindral Johan Laidoner ja Eesti Vabariigi hukk 1939–1940. Tallinn: Tänapäev. ISBN 978-9985-62-632-0.

Military offices
| New creation | Commander‑in‑Chief of the Estonian Armed Forces; 1918–1920, 1924–1925, 1934–1940 | Succeeded by Jaan Maide |
