= Kohver =

Family name

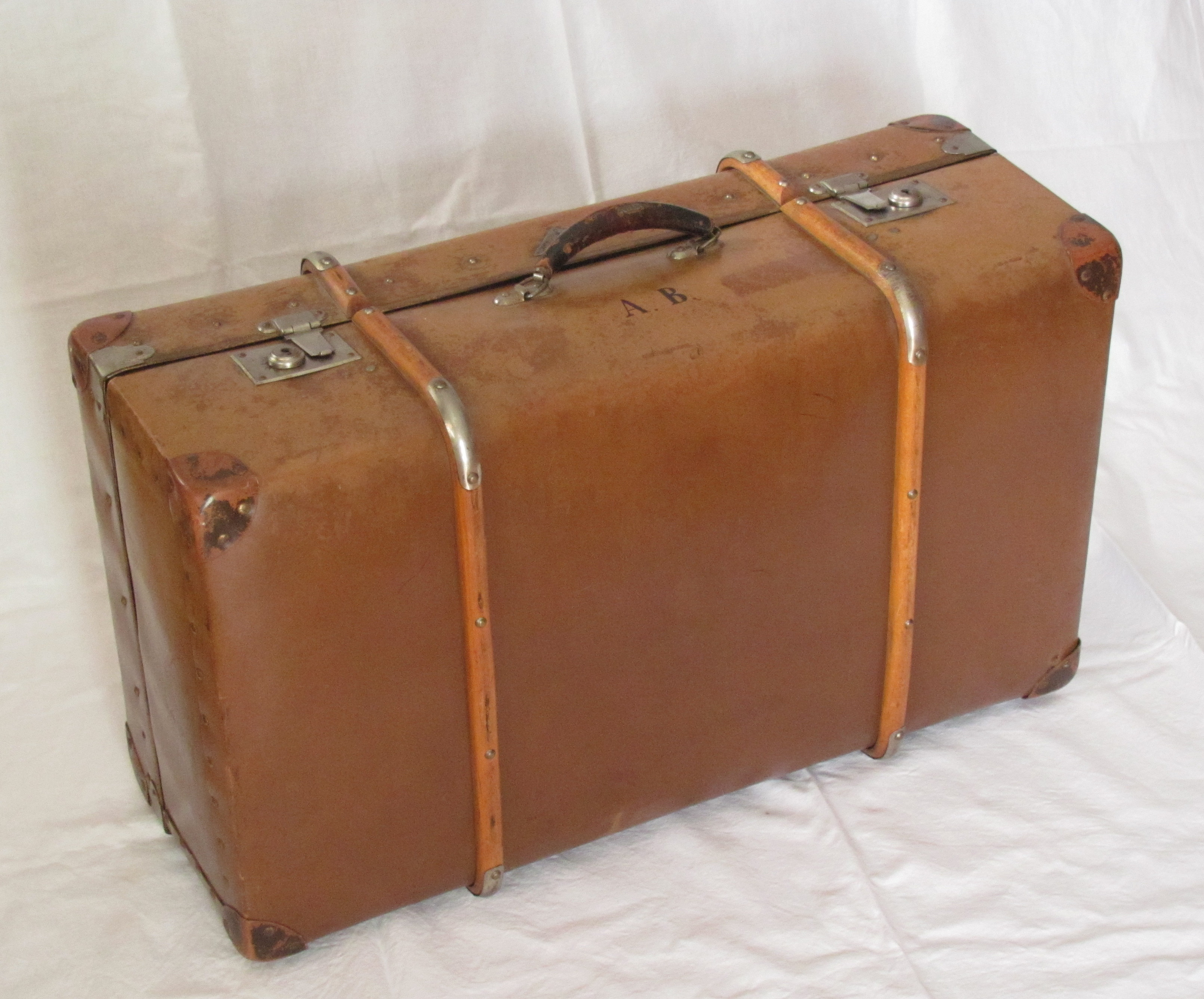

Origin
- Language: Estonian
- Meaning: Suitcase
- Region of origin: Estonia

Kohver is an Estonian surname (meaning suitcase), and may refer to:

- August Kohver (1889–1942), Estonian agronomist and politician
- Eston Kohver (born 1971), Estonian security police officer
