= August Kohver =

Estonian politician (1889–1942)

August Kohver (also known as August Koffer; 1 January 1889 – 19 August 1942) was an Estonian agronomist and politician.

Kohver was born on 1 January 1889 in Vana-Kariste and worked as an agronomist; he was also active in local politics and served as Governor of Võru County. He was elected to the Estonian Provincial Assembly, which governed the Autonomous Governorate of Estonia between 1917 and 1919; he served the full term. He did not sit in the newly formed Republic of Estonia's Asutav Kogu (Constituent Assembly), but was elected to the third legislature of the Riigikogu (Parliament) in 1926 as a member of the Farmers' Assemblies party. He stepped down on 4 December 1927 and was replaced by Konrad Arras. Kohver was elected to the First Chamber of the Estonian National Assembly (Rahvuskogu) which sat in 1937, and was then elected to the newly established Riiginõukogu (Estonian National Council) which sat between 1938 and 1940. He served for the duration of the term, which ended when it was dissolved by the occupying Soviet authorities, who arrested him on 2 January 1941, and deported him to Usolye in Perm Krai in the USSR, where he died on 19 August 1942 aged 53.

== Further information ==
- "Kohver, August", Eesti Biograafiline Andmebaas ISIK (Estonian Literary Museum). Retrieved 26 February 2019.
