= 14th Infantry Division (Russian Empire) =

- 14-я пехотная дивизия
- Active: 1806 – c. 1918
- Country: Russian Empire
- Branch: Russian Imperial Army
- Role: Infantry
- Garrison/HQ: Kishinev
- Engagements: World War I

The 14th Infantry Division (Russian: 14-я пехо́тная диви́зия, 14-ya Pekhotnaya Diviziya) was an infantry formation of the Russian Imperial Army that existed in various formations from the early 19th century until the end of World War I and the Russian Revolution. The division was based in Kishinev in the years leading up to 1914. It fought in World War I and was demobilized in 1918.

== Organization ==
The 14th Infantry Division was part of the 8th Army Corps. Its order of battle in 1914 was as follows:

- 1st Brigade (HQ Kishinev)
  - 53rd Volhynia Infantry Regiment
  - 54th Minsk Infantry Regiment
- 2nd Brigade (HQ Bendery):
  - 55th Podolia Infantry Regiment
  - 56th Zhytomyr Infantry Regiment
- 14th Artillery Brigade

== Commanders ==
- 1907–1913: Alexander Iosafovich Ievreinov

== Chiefs of Staff ==
- 1894–1898: Alexander Iosafovich Ievreinov

== Commanders of the 1st Brigade ==
- 01/28/1829 - 1831 - Major General Braiko, Mikhail Grigorievich
- 09/17/1837 - 02/14/1841 - Major General Markov, Pyotr Antonovich
- 02/14/1841 - 05/13/1843 - Major General Devoinich (de Voynich), Ignatiy Stanislavovich
- xx.xx.xxxxx - 07/20/1848 - Major General Krok, Alexander Ivanovich
- 07/20/1848 - 1854 - Major General Zhabokritsky, Joseph Petrovich
- 1854 - 05/26/1855 - Major General Timofeev, Nikolai Dmitrievich
- earlier 07/15/1855 - 03/28/1857 - Major General Baltz, Karl Gotlibovich
- August 30, 1873 - 09/12, 1874 - Major General Nikolai Nikolayevich Malakhov
- 09/12, 1874 - September 14, 1877 - Major General Iolshin, Mikhail Alexandrovich
- September 14, 1877 - 10/01/1877 - Major General von Thalberg, Otto Germanovich
- 10/12/1877 - 10/25/1878 - Major General Biskupsky, Konstantin Ksaveryevich
- 12.16.1878 - 03.26.1882 - Major General Molsky, Vitaly Konstantinovich
- 03/26/1882 - 01/14/1887 - Major General Plaksin, Vadim Vasilievich
- 02.02.1887 - 03.23.1892 - Major General Gubin, Alexander Mikhailovich
- 03/23/1892 - 07/05/1895 - Major General Zamshin, Ivan Andreevich
- 05.07.1895 - 09.10.1899 - Major General Avramov, Ivan Petrovich
- 10/31/1899 - 07/18/1905 - Major General Glebov, Nikolai Ivanovich
- 07/18/1905 - 12/29/1908 - Major General Voronov, Nikolai Mikhailovich
- 01/05/1909 - 07/19/1914 - Major General Zubkovsky, Andrey Fyodorovich
