= Aleksander Einseln =

Estonian general, the Commander of the Estonian Defence Forces from 1993 to 1995

Commander of the Estonian Defence Forces
- In office 1 May 1993 – 4 December 1995
- President: Lennart Meri
- Preceded by: Jaan Maide (before Soviet occupation during World War II)
- Succeeded by: Johannes Kert

Personal details
- Born: 25 October 1931 Tallinn, Estonia
- Died: 16 March 2017 (aged 85) Tallinn, Estonia

Military service
- Allegiance: United States (1950–1985); Estonia (1993–1995)
- Branch/service: United States Army; Estonian Land Forces
- Years of service: 1950–1985, 1993–1995
- Rank: Kindral
- Commands: Estonian Defence Forces
- Battles/wars: Korean War; Vietnam War
- Awards: See: Awards, decorations, and recognition

Aleksander Einseln (25 October 1931 – 16 March 2017) was an Estonian general, the Commander of Estonian Defence Forces from 1993 to 1995, and previously a United States Army colonel. In 1944, Einseln, aged 12, became a war refugee as he fled from Estonia to escape from the invading Soviet army. In 1949, he emigrated to the United States. From 1950 to 1985, he served in the US Army, taking part in the Korean War, and as a Special Forces ("Green Berets") A-team commander in the Vietnam War. In 1993, at the request of then president Lennart Meri, Einseln returned to Estonia to serve as the first Commander of its armed forces after the end of Soviet occupation and the restoration of independent Estonia in August 1991.

== Biography ==
Aleksander Einseln was born on 25 October 1931 in Tallinn, capital of then independent Estonia. During World War II, after the Soviet invasion and occupation of Estonia in 1940, the Soviet NKVD arrested and deported his father to a Gulag prison camp in Russia. Aleksander Einseln and his mother were able to escape from the second Soviet invasion of Estonia in 1944, becoming displaced persons (DPs) in postwar Germany. In 1949, they emigrated to the United States.

Just before the outbreak of the Korean War in 1950, Einseln enlisted in the United States Army, and served as a paratrooper. In 1955, he was commissioned as a lieutenant, and in 1964 completed the US Army Special Forces officer qualification course. He served with Special Forces in Vietnam during 1965–1966. In 1968, he graduated from George Washington University, and the next year from the Army Staff College. Einseln served another tour in Vietnam in 1971–1972. During 1975–1976 he served in staff training positions at Army headquarters. After graduating from the National Defense College senior course, Einseln served from 1977 to 1982 as head of the European and NATO office in the Planning and Policy Division of the Joint Chiefs of Staff. After that, he held post of Deputy Inspector General in the United States Pacific Command until his retirement in 1985. During his career in the US Army, Einseln commanded infantry, paratroop, Special Forces and training units, earning 28 medals and retiring as a colonel.

In 1993, at the request of then President Lennart Meri of Estonia, Einseln returned to his homeland to take command of its military forces, over some objections of the U.S. State Department. Some government officials reportedly threatened to terminate Einseln's military pension and even to revoke his citizenship, however, after getting support from several U.S. senators, Einseln received official permission from the United States government to take on his new foreign position in Estonia.

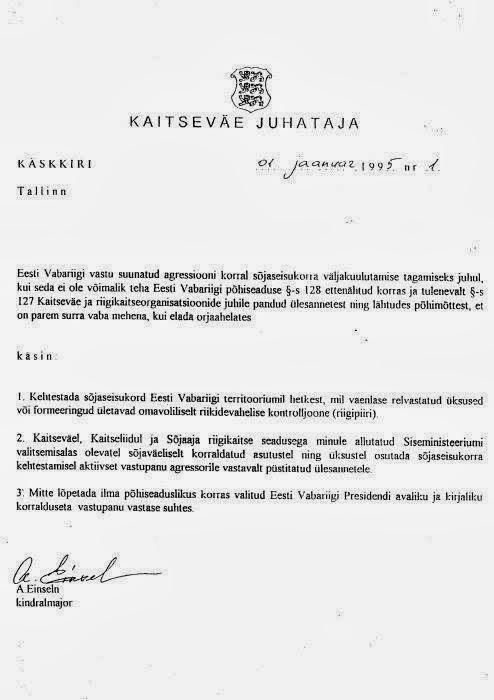
Einseln's decree ordering immediate resistance in case of foreign aggression

In January 1995, after the start of the First Chechen War, Einseln issued an order stating that in the event of foreign troops crossing the border, Estonian Defence Forces were to immediately initiate active resistance, and not cease fighting until ordered to do so by the President of Estonia. This was intended as a mechanism to prevent surrender without resistance as had happened in June 1940. In 2014, after the beginning of the Russo-Ukrainian war, active Commander-in-Chief General Riho Terras noted that Einseln's decree is still in force.

Earlier, on 4 December 1995, General Einseln handed in his resignation as Commander of the Armed Forces due to a disagreement with the Minister of Defense.

In February 1996, he was awarded the Estonian Order of the Cross of the Eagle.

Einseln died in his birthtown Tallinn, Estonia on 16 March 2017, aged 85. His ashes were buried on 2 April 2018 at Arlington National Cemetery alongside other veterans of the Korean and Vietnam Wars.

== Effective dates of promotion ==
=== Estonian Army ===
See Military ranks of Estonia

Promotions
Insignia	Rank	Date
	Colonel	1993
	Major General	17 June 1993
	Lieutenant General	22 June 1995
	General	3 December 1995

== Awards, decorations, and recognition ==
=== Awards and decorations ===
Estonian Awards and decorations
2nd Class of the Order of the Cross of the Eagle	16 February 1996
Distinguished Service Decoration of the Peace Operations Centre	30 January 2001
U.S. Awards and decorations
Defense Superior Service Medal	
Legion of Merit	
Bronze Star Medal with one Oak Leaf Cluster	
Air Medal	
Army Commendation Medal with four Oak Leaf Clusters	
Army Good Conduct Medal (several awards)	
Army of Occupation Medal	
National Defense Service Medal with one Oak Leaf Cluster	
Korean Service Medal with three campaign stars	
Vietnam Service Medal with two service stars	
Army Service Ribbon	
Army Overseas Service Ribbon	
Foreign Awards
Gallantry Cross (Vietnam) with 2 stars	
Republic of Vietnam Armed Forces Honor Medal, First Class	
Republic of Vietnam Staff Service Honor Medal First Class	
Republic of Korea Presidential Unit Citation	
Republic of Vietnam Gallantry Cross Unit Citation with palm	
United Nations Service Medal	
Republic of Vietnam Campaign Medal with 1960- device	

Estonian Badges
The Order of Merit of Estonian Border Guard "Sword and Lynx"
Estonian Border Guard badge
Other Accoutrements
Combat Infantryman Badge with Star
Special Forces Tab
Ranger tab
Senior Parachutist Badge
Office of the Joint Chiefs of Staff Identification Badge
Army Staff Identification Badge
Republic of Vietnam Parachutist Badge

== Notes ==
Military offices
Preceded by Jaan Maide as Commander-in-Chief of the Estonian Military	Commander of the Defence Forces; 1993-1995	Succeeded by Johannes Kert
