= Alexander Ievreinov =

Imperial Russian brigade, division and corps commander

Alexander Iosafovich Ievreinov
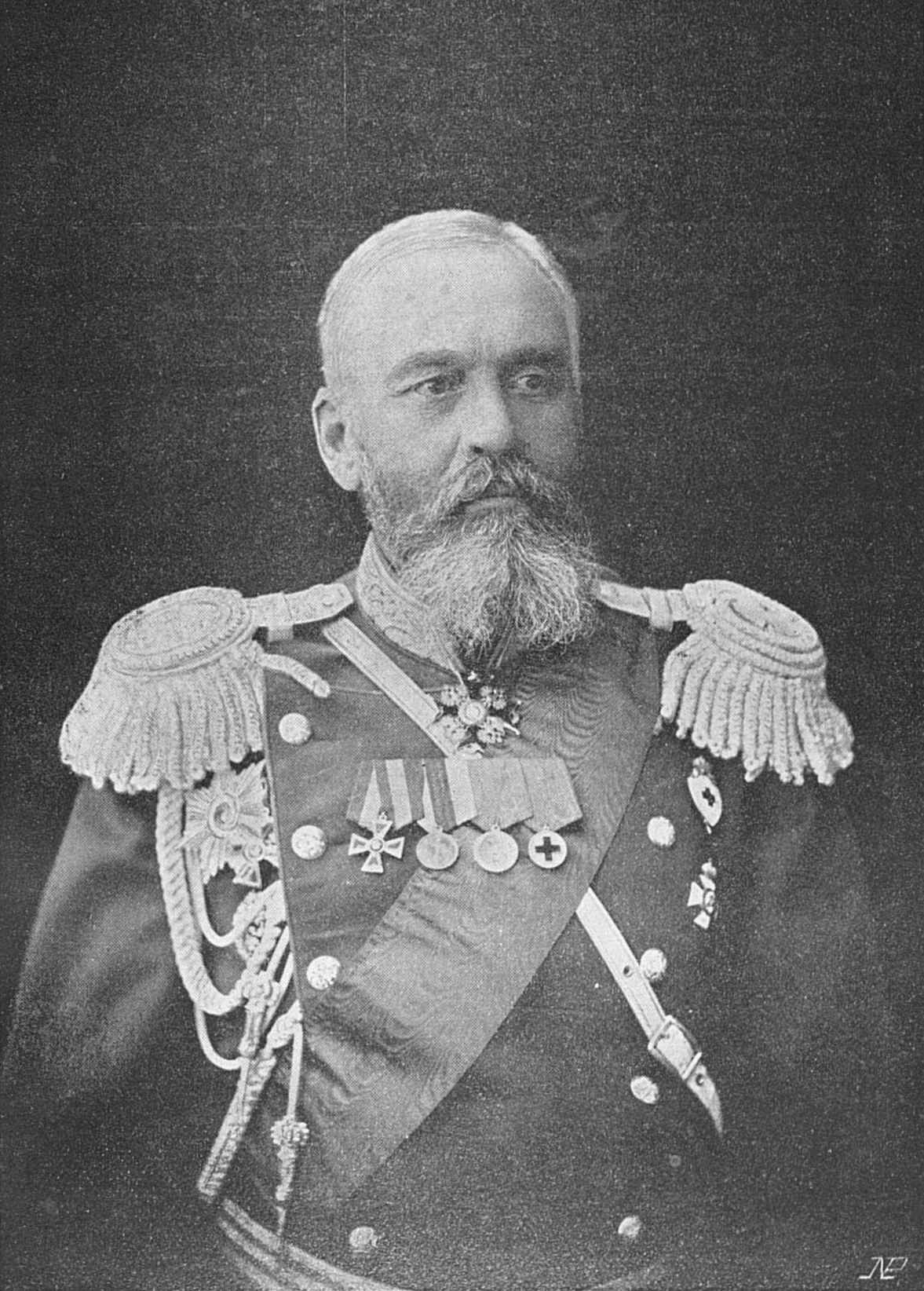
- Born: August 28, 1851
- Died: 1929 (aged 77–78)
- Allegiance: Russian Empire
- Branch: Imperial Russian Army
- Rank: General of the Infantry
- Commands: 1st Brigade, 29th Infantry Division; 45th Infantry Division; 14th Infantry Division; 62nd Infantry Division; 20th Army Corps
- Conflicts: Russo-Turkish War; World War I

Alexander Iosafovich Ievreinov (Russian: Алекса́ндр Иоаса́фович Иевреинов, August 28, 1851 – 1929) was an Imperial Russian brigade, division and corps commander. He was made a captain in 1881, a Podpolkovnik (lieutenant colonel) in 1885, a Polkovnik (colonel) in 1889, a major general in 1899, and a lieutenant general in 1906.

He attempted to rescue the Romanovs in 1918, but was unable to do so.

== Awards ==
- Order of Saint Stanislaus (House of Romanov), 3rd class, 1875
- Order of Saint Anna, 3rd class, 1880
- Order of Saint Stanislaus (House of Romanov), 2nd class, 1883
- Order of Saint Anna, 2nd class, 1887
- Order of Saint Vladimir, 4th class, 1892
- Order of Saint Vladimir, 3rd class, 1896
- Order of Saint Stanislaus (House of Romanov), 1st class, 1904
- Order of Saint Anna, 1st class (December 6, 1909)
- Order of Saint Vladimir, 2nd class (December 6, 1913)
- Order of Saint George, 4th degree (March 25, 1915)
- Order of the White Eagle (Russian Empire) (April 9, 1915)

Preceded by	Chief of Staff of the 39th Infantry Division; 1890–1891	Succeeded by
Preceded by Vladimir Vasilyevich Smirnov	Chief of Staff of the 5th Infantry Division; 1891–1894	Succeeded by
Preceded by	Chief of Staff of the 14th Infantry Division; 1894–1898	Succeeded by
Preceded by	Commander of the 1st Brigade, 29th Infantry Division; 1902–1906	Succeeded by
Preceded by	Commander of the 45th Infantry Division; 1906–1907	Succeeded by
Preceded by	Commander of the 14th Infantry Division; 1907–1913	Succeeded by
Preceded by	Commander of the 62nd Infantry Division; 1914–1915	Succeeded by
Preceded by Pavel Bulgakov	Commander of the 20th Army Corps; 1915–1917	Succeeded by Alexander Yakovich Elshin
