= Estonian War Museum =

Museum in Viimsi, Estonia

Estonian War Museum – General Laidoner Museum
- Eesti Sõjamuuseum – kindral Laidoneri muuseum
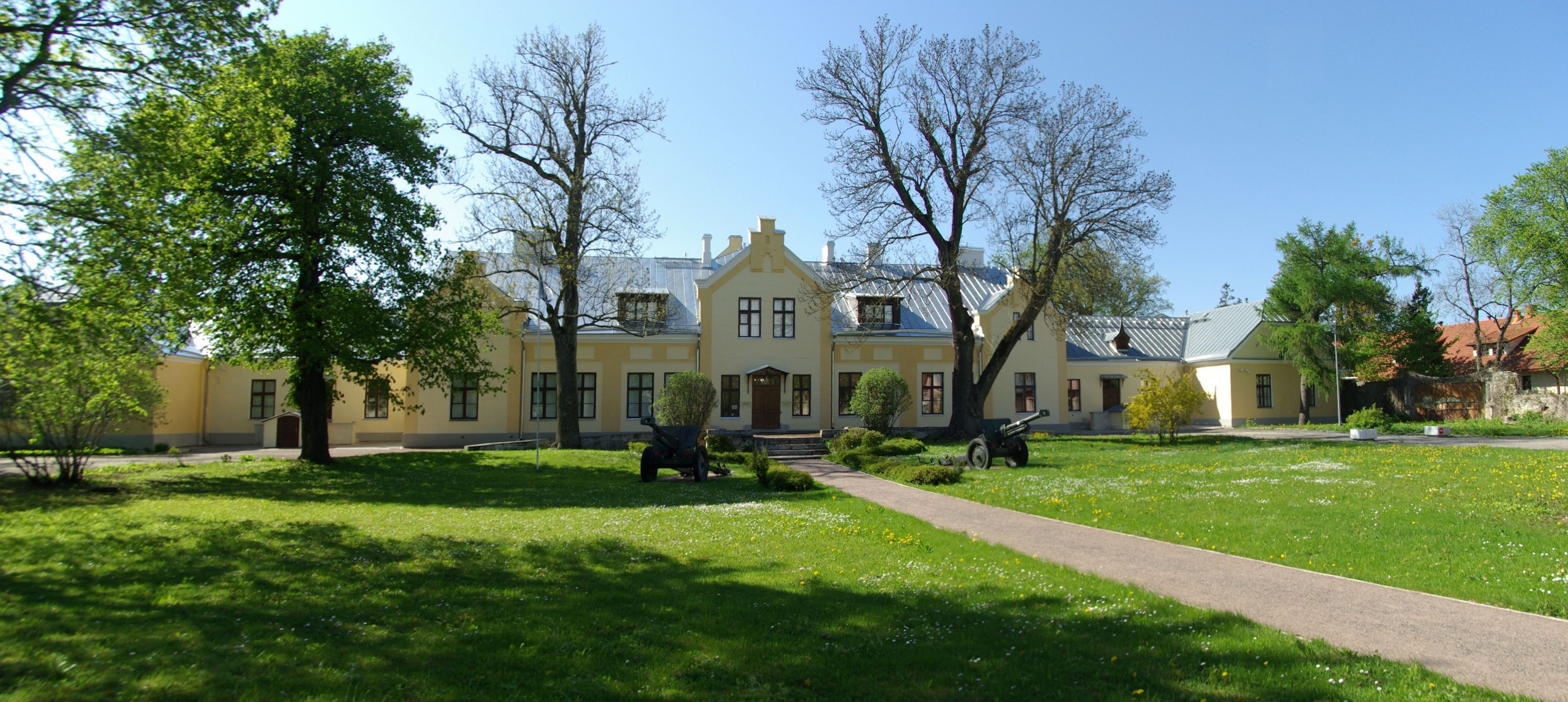
- The museum is located in the former Viimsi Manor house
- Established: 1919
- Location: Pargi tee 12, Viimsi, 74001 Harju maakond, Estonia
- Coordinates: 59°30′05″N 24°50′04″E
- Type: Military history
- Website: esm.ee

The Estonian War Museum (full name Estonian War Museum – General Laidoner Museum; Estonian: Eesti Sõjamuuseum – kindral Laidoneri muuseum) is a war museum in Viimsi, Estonia. The museum is dedicated to military history of Estonia. The museum is named after Estonian general Johan Laidoner.

The museum was established in 1919 as Museum of the Estonian War of Independence. At the time of establishing, the Estonian War of Independence was not over (ended in 1920).

1921–1940, the leader of the museum was Taavet Poska. At this time, the museum was located in Tallinn Old Town at Vene Street 5. In 1940, the museum was closed.

The museum was re-established in 2001.

Due to the limited space around the Viimsi Manor house, the potential new location for the museum may be in Patarei Sea Fortress in Tallinn.
