= 62nd Infantry Division (Russian Empire) =

- 62-я пехотная дивизия
- Active: 1914–1918
- Country: Russian Empire
- Branch: Russian Imperial Army
- Role: Infantry

The 62nd Infantry Division (Russian: 62-я пехотная дивизия, 62-ya Pekhotnaya Diviziya) was an infantry formation of the Russian Imperial Army.

== Organization ==
- 1st Brigade
  - 245th Infantry Regiment
  - 246th Infantry Regiment
- 2nd Brigade
  - 247th Infantry Regiment
  - 248th Infantry Regiment

== Commanders ==
- 1914-1915: Alexander Iosafovich Ievreinov
