= Vana-Kariste =

Village in Estonia

- Village
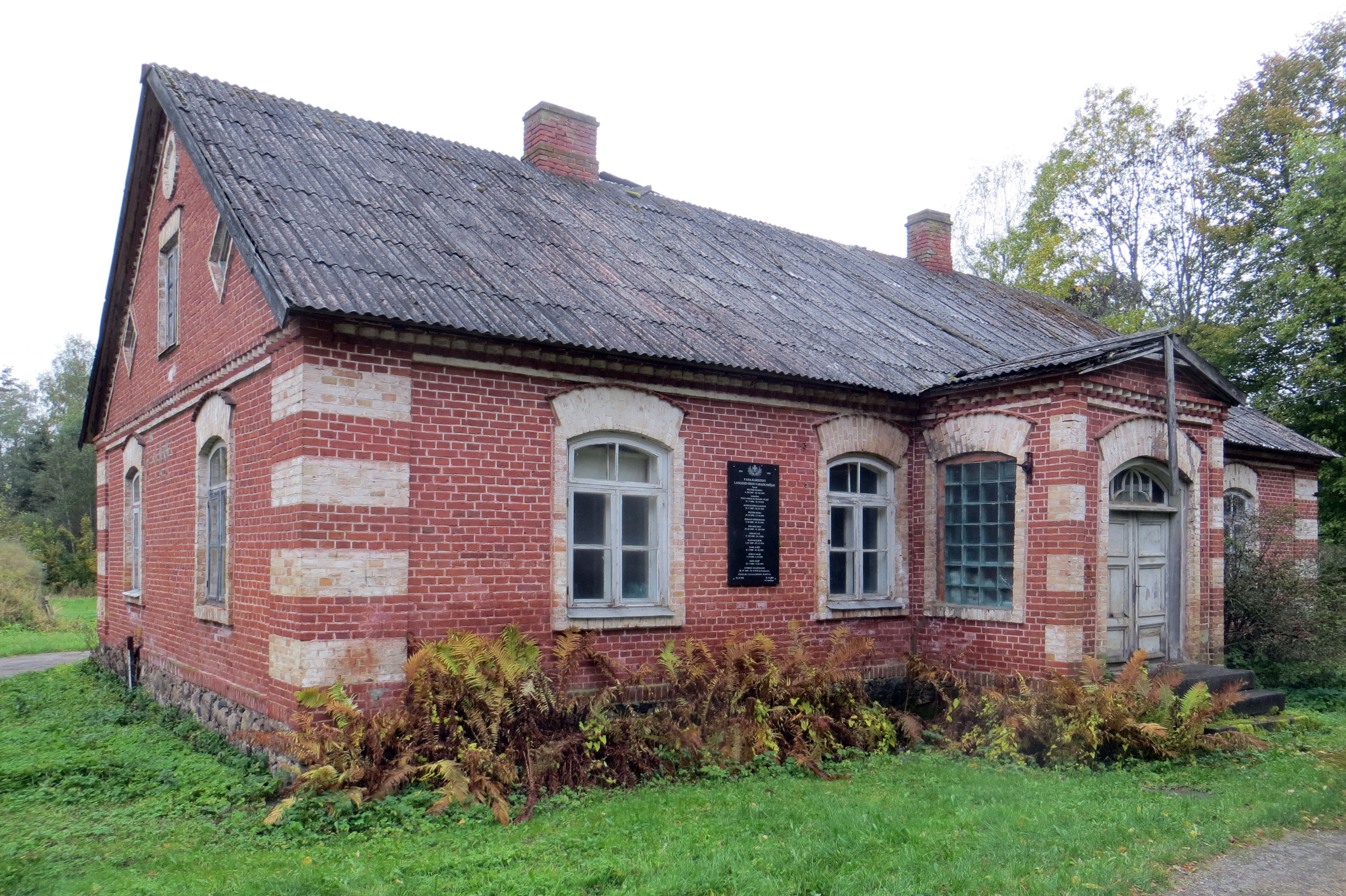
- Vana-Kariste parish house

- Location in Estonia
- Coordinates: 58°10′20″N 25°17′08″E
- Country: Estonia
- County: Viljandi County
- Municipality: Mulgi Parish

Population (01.01.2000)
  - Total: 95

Vana-Kariste is a village in Mulgi Parish, Viljandi County, in southern Estonia. It has a population of 95 (as of 1 January 2000).

== History ==
From July 11, 1991 to October 24, 2017, the village was part of Galliste rural municipality.

== Attractions ==
- Vana - Kariste mõis.
- The administrative building of the former Vana-Karyste parish.
