= Field force =

Military unit

A field force in British, Indian Army and Tanzanian military parlance is a combined arms land force operating under actual or assumed combat circumstances, usually for the length of a specific military campaign. It is used by other nations, but can have a different meaning.

== United Kingdom ==
A field force would be created from the various units in an area of military operations and be named for the geographical area. Examples are:

- Kurram Valley Field Force, 1878
- Peshawar Valley Field Force, 1878
- Kabul Field Force, 1879–1880
- Kabul-Kandahar Field Force, 1880
- Natal Field Force, 1881,
- Zhob Field Force, 1890
- Mashonaland Field Force, 1896
- Malakand Field Force, 1896
- Tirah Field Force, 1897
- West African Frontier Force, 1900

== Australian ==
In Australia, a field force comprises the units required to meet operational commitments.

== Canadian ==
The Canadian Expeditionary Force was considered as a field force created to participate in World War I.

Other Canadian field forces in history include:

- Alberta Field Force, 1885
- Northwest Field Force, 1885
- Yukon Field Force, 1898–1900

== United States ==
In the United States, during the Vietnam War the term came to stand for a corps-sized organization with other functions and responsibilities. To avoid confusion with the corps designations used by the Army of the Republic of Vietnam and to allow for a flexible organization, MACV and General William Westmoreland developed the "field force" such as I Field Force and II Field Force. Unlike an Army corps, which had a size and structure fixed by Army doctrine, the field force could expand as needed and had other functions such as liaison with South Vietnamese and civil affairs functions and was flexible enough to have many subordinate units assigned to it.

== Police field forces ==
In counterinsurgency type campaigns, select and specially trained units of police armed and equipped as light infantry have been designated as police field forces who perform paramilitary type patrols and ambushes whilst retaining their police powers in areas that were highly dangerous.

== Police Field Forces, Paramilitary and Counter-Insurgency Units ==
=== A ===
Albania

- Royal Albanian Army 1928 - 1939
  - Royal Albanian Gendarmerie 1913 - 1939
  - Royal Border Guard (Albania) 1928 - 1939

Afghanistan

- Afghan Army
  - Afghan Border Force
  - Afghan National Civil Order Force 2006 - 2020
- Defense of the Revolution 1978 - 1980
- Sarandoy 1978 - 1992

Algeria

- Garde communale 1996 - 2012, (Algerian Civil War)

=== B ===
Bangladesh

- Bangladesh Ansar

Belgium

- Flemish Guard 1941 - 1944, (German occupation of Belgium during World War II)
- Walloon Guard 1941 - 1944

Belarus

- Byelorussian Auxiliary Police 1941 - 1944, (Byelorussian collaboration with Nazi Germany)
  - 13th Belarusian Police (SD) Battalion 1943 -1944, (German occupation of Byelorussia during World War II)
  - Schutzmannschaft-Brigade Siegling 1944 only

Brazil

- Brazilian Army
  - Military Police (Brazil)
    - National Public Security Force
    - Military Police of Acre State
    - Military Police of Espirito Santo State
    - Military Police of Goiás State
    - Military Police of Minas Gerais State
    - Military Police of Parana State
    - Military Police of Rio de Janeiro State
    - Military Police of São Paulo State
- Public Forces (Brazil) 1880s - 1960s

=== C ===
China

- Paramilitary forces of China
  - People's Armed Police

Colombia

- National Police of Colombia
  - Directorate of Carabineers and Rural Security
    - Mobile Carabinier Squadrons

Independent State of Croatia 1941 - 1945

- German-Croatian Police 1941 - 1944

=== D ===
Denmark

- HIPO Corps 1944 - 1945
  - Lorenzen Group 1944 - 1945, (Denmark in World War II)

=== E ===
Estonia

- Estonian Auxiliary Police 1941 - 1944, (German occupation of Estonia during World War II)
  - 36th Estonian Police Battalion 1943 - 1944 (German occupation of the Baltic states during World War II)
  - Schutzmannschaft Battalion 33

=== F ===
Vichy France

- French National Police
  - Special Brigades
- Groupe mobile de réserve 1941 -1944
- Milice 1943 - 1944
  - Franc-Garde 1943 - 1944

=== G and H ===
Gambia

- British Army
  - Gambia Regiment 1901 - 1958
- Gambia Police Force
  - Field Force,

East Germany

- Volkspolizei 1945 - 1990
  - Volkspolizei-Bereitschaft 1955 - 1990

Nazi Germany

- Ordnungspolizei (Order Police) 1936 - 1945, (Police forces of Nazi Germany)
  - Police Regiment Centre 1941 -1942 (Bandenbekampfung)
    - Police Battalion 307 1941 - 1942
    - Police Battalion 316 1941 - 1942
    - Police Battalion 322 1941 - 1942
  - Police Regiment North 1941 - 1942
  - Police Regiment South 1941 - 1942
    - Police Battalion 45 1941 - 1942
    - Police Battalion 303 1941 - 1942
    - Police Battalion 314 1941 - 1942
  - Order Police battalions
    - Police Battalion 306 1941 - 1942
    - Police Battalion 309 1941 - 1945
    - Police Battalion 320 1941 - 1942
    - Reserve Police Battalion 33 1941 - 1943
    - Reserve Police Battalion 101 1940 - 1943
  - SS Police Regiment Bozen 1943 - 1945
  - SS Police Regiment Brixen 1944 - 1945
  - Schutzmannschaft 1941 - 1945
- Forest Protection Command 1939 -
- Schutzstaffel (SS) 1925 - 1945
  - 1st SS Police Regiment 1942 - 1945
  - 2nd SS Police Regiment 1942 - 1943
  - 3rd SS Police Regiment 1942 - 1943
  - 4th SS Police Regiment 1942 - 1943
  - 5th SS Police Regiment 1942 - 1944
  - 6th SS Police Regiment 1942 - 1945
  - 7th SS Police Regiment 1943 only
  - 8th SS Police Regiment 1942 - 1945
  - 9th SS Police Regiment 1942 - 1945
  - 10th SS Police Regiment 1942 - 1944
  - 11th SS Police Regiment 1942 -1944
  - 12th SS Police Regiment 1942 - 1944
  - 13th SS Police Regiment 1942 - 1944
  - 14th SS Police Regiment 1942 - 1944
  - 15th SS Police Regiment 1942 -
  - 16th SS Police Regiment 1942 - 1944
  - 17th SS Police Regiment 1942 -
  - 18th SS Mountain Police Regiment 1942
  - 19th SS Police Regiment 1942 -
  - 20th SS Police Regiment 1942 -
  - 21st SS Police Regiment 1942 -
  - 22nd SS Police Regiment 1942 -
  - 23rd SS Police Regiment 1942 - 1945
  - 24th SS Police Regiment 1942 -
  - 25th SS Police Regiment 1942 -
  - 26th SS Police Regiment 1942 - 1944
  - 27th SS Police Regiment 1942 -
  - 28th SS Police Regiment Todt 1942 -
- Allgemeine SS 1934 - 1945
  - Postschutz 1933 - 1945
- Waffen-SS 1933 - 1945
  - 4th SS Polizei Panzergrenadier Division 1939 - 1945
  - Kaminski Brigade 1941 - 1944
- Zollgrenzschutz 1918 - 1945

=== I ===
Indonesia

- Indonesian National Police
  - Mobile Brigade Corps

India

- Paramilitary forces of India
  - Home Guard (India)
  - National Security Guards
    - 51 Special Action Group
  - Railway Protection Force
  - Special Protection Group
- Research and Analysis Wing
  - Special Frontier Force
  - Special Group (India)
- Central Armed Police Force
  - Border Security Force
  - Central Industrial Security Force
  - Indo-Tibetan Border Police
    - Indo-Tibetan Border Police (Water Wing)
  - Sashastra Seema Bal
  - Central Reserve Police Force
    - Bastariya Battalion
    - Commando Battalion for Resolute Action
- Indian Army
  - Assam Rifles
  - Rashtriya Rifles
- State Armed Police Forces
  - Andhra Pradesh Police
    - Greyhounds
  - Jammu and Kashmir Police
    - Special Operations Group
  - Kerala Police
    - Kerala Thunderbolts
  - Mizoram Armed Police
  - Odisha Police
    - Special Operation Group (Odisha)
  - Telangana Police
    - Greyhounds (police)
  - Uttar Pradesh Provincial Armed Constabulary
  - West Bengal Police
    - Counter Insurgency Force
    - Eastern Frontier Rifles

Iran

- Law Enforcement Command of the Islamic Republic of Iran
  - Border Guard Command (Iran)

Iraq

- Wolf Brigade (Iraq)

Ireland

- Royal Irish Constabulary 1822 - 1922
  - Auxiliary Division 1920 - 1922, (irish War of Independence)
  - Black and Tans 1920 -1922, (Irish War of Independence)
- Garda Síochána (Irish Police)
  - Criminal Investigation Department (Ireland) 1921 - 1923, (Irish Civil War)

Israel

- Israel Police
  - Israel Border Police

Italian Social Republic

- Blackshirts 1923 -1943
  - Battaglioni M 1941 - 1943
  - Black Brigades 1944 - 1945
  - Border Militia 1926 - 1943
  - Forestry Militia 1926 - 1948
  - Maritime Artillery Militia 1939 - 1943
  - Port Militia 1924 -

=== J and K ===
Kenya

- Kenya Police
  - General Service Unit (Mau Mau Uprising)
  - Administration Police

=== L ===
Kingdom of Laos

- Royal Lao Police 1955 - 1975
  - Directorate of National Coordination 1960 - 1965, (Laotian Civil War)

Latvia

- Latvian Auxiliary Police 1941 - 1944, (German occupation of Latvia during World War II)

Lithuania

- Lithuanian TDA Battalion 1941 only, (German occupation of Lithuania during World War II)
- Lithuanian Auxiliary Police 1941 - 1945 (German occupation of the Baltic states during World War II)
  - 10th Lithuanian Police Battalion 1941 - 1945
  - 256th Lithuanian Police Battalion 1943 - 1944
  - 258th Lithuanian Police Battalion 1944 only
  - 259th Lithuanian Police Battalion 1944 only

=== M ===
Malaysia

- Royal Malaysian Police
  - General Operations Force (Malayan Emergency)
    - Senoi Praaq
  - Marine Operations Force (Malayan Emergency)

(United Kingdom) Mandatory Palestine

- British Gendarmerie 1922 - 1926
- Special Night Squads 1938 - 1939

Mauritius

- Mauritius Police Force
  - Special Mobile Force

Mexico

- Mexican Army
  - Rurales

Moldova

- Moldovan Police
  - Special Forces Brigade "Fulger"

Myanmar

- Myanmar Army
  - Border Guard Forces
- Myanmar Police Force
  - Border Guard Police

=== N ===
Namibia

- Namibian Police Force
  - Special Field Force

Nigeria

- Nigerian Police Force
  - Nigerian Mobile Police
- Nigeria Security and Civil Defence Corps

Norway

- Statspolitiet 1941 - 1945, (German occupation of Norway)

=== O and P ===
Pakistan

- Civil Armed Forces - (Paramilitary forces of Pakistan)
  - Frontier Corps
    - Frontier Corps Balochistan (North)
      - Kurram Militia
      - Zhob Militia
    - Frontier Corps Balochistan (South)
      - Chagai Militia
      - Dalbandin Rifles
      - Kharan Rifles
      - Taftan Rifles
    - Frontier Corps Khyber Pakhtunkhwa (North)
      - Bajaur Scouts
      - Bara Rifles
      - Chitral Scouts
      - Dir Scouts
      - Khyber Rifles
      - Mahsud Scouts
      - Mohmand Rifles
      - Orakzai Scouts
      - Shawal Rifles
    - Frontier Corps Khyber Pakhtunkhwa (South)
      - Kurram Militia
      - Zhob Militia
  - Frontier Constabulary
  - Gilgit-Baltistan Scouts
- Pakistan Rangers
    - Punjab Rangers
    - Sindh Rangers
- Pakistan Army
  - Pakistan Coast Guard
  - National Guard (Pakistan)
    - Janbaz Force
    - Mujahid Force
- Pakistan Levies
  - Balochistan Levies
  - Dir Levies
  - Malakand Levies
- Pakistan Navy
  - Pakistan Maritime Security Agency
- Former Paramilitary Forces
  - Azad Kashmir Regular Force 1947 - 1972
  - Federal Security Force (Pakistan) 1972 - 1977
  - Gilgit Scouts 1913 - 1975
  - Khasadar 1892 - 2019
  - Mehran Force 1942 - 1995

Peru

- National Police of Peru
  - Sinchis - Internal conflict in Peru

Philippines

- Philippine National Police
  - Special Action Force

Portugal

- Provincial organization of volunteers and civil defence

=== Q and R ===
Rhodesia

- British South African Police 1889 - 1980
  - Police Anti-Terrorist Unit 1966 - 1980, (Rhodesian Bush War) 1964 - 1979
  - Police Support Unit
- INTAF 1962 - 1979
  - Grey's Scouts 1975 - 1986, (Rhodesian Bush War) 1964 - 1979
  - Guard Force (Rhodesia) 1976 - 1980
- Security Force Auxiliaries 1978 - 1979 (Rhodesian Bush War 1964 - 1979

Russia

- Internal Troops of Russia 1991 - 2016
  - Rus (special forces) 1994 -2008
  - Vityaz (MVD) 1991 - 2008
- Zubr (special police force)

=== S ===
Solomon Islands

- Royal Solomon Islands Police Force
  - Police Field Force

South Africa

- South African Army
  - Commando System (South Africa)

South Vietnam

- Republic of Vietnam National Police 1955 - 1975
  - Republic of Vietnam National Police Field Force 1966 - 1975, (Vietnam War)
  - Republic of Vietnam River and Coastal Police 1965 - 1975, (Vietnam War)

South West Africa

- South West African Police 1920 - 1990
  - Koevoet 1979 - 1989

Sri Lanka

- Ministry of Defence (Sri Lanka)
  - Sri Lanka Civil Security Force
  - Sri Lanka Coast Guard
- Sri Lanka Police
  - Special Task Force (Sri Lankan Civil War)

Syria

- Syrian Special Mission Forces

=== T ===
Tanzania

- Police Field Force (Zanzibar Revolution)

Thailand

- Royal Thai Police
  - Border Patrol Police
    - Thahan Phran
    - Village Scouts
    - Volunteer Defense Corps (Thailand)

Turkey

- Gendarmerie General Command
  - Village guard system

=== U ===
Ukraine

- National Guard of Ukraine

=== V ===
Vatican City

- Swiss Guard

Vanuatu

- Vanuatu Police Force
  - Vanuatu Mobile Force

Vietnam

- Vietnam People's Public Security
  - Mobile Police Command

=== Z ===
Zimbabwe

- Zimbabwe Republic Police
  - Police Support Unit

== See also ==
- List of gendarmeries
- List of police tactical units
