= List of SS and police commands =

SS and police commands were senior level commands of the SS that existed under the authority of the SS and police leaders. The commands were first authorized in 1937 as extensions of the power granted to SS-Oberabschnitt commanders of the Allgemeine-SS (General-SS). The SS and police leaders were drawn from the general-SS Abschnitt and Oberabschnitt commands; it was a common occurrence for the same SS officer to hold both posts.

The SS and police commands were technically under the authority of the Allgemeine-SS, however during time of war the post was granted authority over Waffen-SS commands. In 1944, most SS and police leaders were granted equivalent Waffen-SS rank.

There were three levels of the SS and police commands: SS und Polizeiführer (SSPF), Höhere SS und Polizeiführer (HSSPF), and Höchste SS und Polizeiführer (HöSSPF).

== Supreme SS and police commands ==
The Höchste SS und Polizeiführer (HöSSPF) commands were as follows:

- Italien
- Ukraine

== Higher SS and police commands ==
The Höhere SS und Polizeiführer (HSSPF) commands were as follows:

- Adriatisches Küstenland
- Albanien
- Alpenland
- Belgien-Nordfrankreich
- Böhmen und Mähren
- Danmark
- Donau
- Elbe
- Frankreich
- Fulda-Werra
- Griechenland
- Kroatien
- Main
- Mitte
- Nord
- Nordost
- Nordsee
- Nordwest
- Ost
- Ostland und Rußland-Nord
- Ostsee
- Rhein-Westmark
- Rußland-Mitte
- Rußland-Süd
- Schwarzes-Meer
- Serbien, Sandschack und Montenegro
- Slowakien
- Spree
- Süd
- Südost
- Südwest
- Ungarn
- Warthe
- Weichsel
- West

A further command, known as Höhere SS und Polizeiführer z.b.V. Kaukasien was planned for activation in the Caucasus but was never formed.

== SS and police commands ==
The SS und Polizeiführer (SSPF) commands were as follows:

- Aserbeidschan
- Awdejewka
- Bergvolker-Ordshonikidseo
- Bialystok
- Bozen
- Charkow
- Dnjepropetrowsk-Krivoi-Rog
- Estland
- Friaul
- Görz
- Istrien
- Kattowitz
- Kaukasien-Kuban
- Kertsch-Tamanhalbinsel
- Kiew
- Krakau
- Lemberg
- Lettland
- Litauen
- Lublin
- Metz
- Mitteitalien-Verona
- Mitte-Norwegen
- Mogilew
- Montenegro
- Nikolajew
- Nord-Kaukasien
- Nord-Norwegen
- Ober-Elsaß
- Oberitalien-Mitte
- Oberitalien-West
- Pripet
- Quarnero
- Radom
- Rowno
- Rostow-Awdejewka
- Salzburg
- Sandschak
- Saratow
- Shitomir
- Stalino-Donezgebiet
- Stanislav-Rostow
- Süd-Norwegen
- Taurien-Krim-Simferopol
- Triest
- Tschernigow
- Warsaw
- Weißruthenien (also known as Minsk)
- Wolhynien-Brest-Litovsk

== SS and police formations ==
- 1st SS Police Regiment
- 2nd SS Police Regiment
- 3rd SS Police Regiment
- 4th SS Police Regiment
- 5th SS Police Regiment
- 6th SS Police Regiment
- 7th SS Police Regiment
- 8th SS Police Regiment
- 9th SS Police Regiment
- 10th SS Police Regiment
- 11th SS Police Regiment
- 12th SS Police Regiment
- 13th SS Police Regiment
- 14th SS Police Regiment
- 15th SS Police Regiment
- 16th SS Police Regiment
- 17th SS Police Regiment
- 18th SS Police Regiment
- 19th SS Police Regiment
- 20th SS Police Regiment
- 21st SS Police Regiment
- 22nd SS Police Regiment
- 23rd SS Police Regiment
- 24th SS Police Regiment
- 25th SS Police Regiment
- 26th SS Police Regiment
- 27th SS Police Regiment
- 28th SS Police Regiment
- 29th SS Police Regiment
- 30th SS Police Regiment

== Ethnic SS police formations ==
- SS Police Regiment Bozen
- SS Police Regiment Brixen
- SS Police Regiment Alpenvorland
- SS Police Regiment Schlanders
