= 6th SS Police Regiment =

- Country: Nazi Germany
- Branch: Schutzstaffel
- Type: Security
- Size: Regiment
- Garrison/HQ: Wehrkreis II

The 6th SS Police Regiment (German: SS-Polizei-Regiment 6) was initially named the 6th Police Regiment (Polizei-Regiment 6) when it was formed in 1942 from existing Order Police (Ordnungspolizei) units for security duties on the Eastern Front. It was redesignated as an SS unit in early 1943.

== Formation and organization ==
The regiment was ordered formed in July 1942 in Russia, but the regimental headquarters was not formed until 2 September. Police Battalion 82 (Polizei-Bataillon 82), Police Battalion 311 and Police Battalion 318 were redesignated as the regiment's first through third battalions, respectively. All of the police regiments were redesignated as SS police units on 24 February 1943.

The regimental headquarters was destroyed in January 1943 and its remnants were withdrawn to Adlershorst, (now Rusko, Poland), where they may have been used to form the headquarters of the 24th SS Police Regiment. Its battalions, however, were assigned to different German Army security divisions and did not suffer its fate. The Third Battalion was stationed in the rear of the 8th Italian Army when it was overrun by the Red Army during Operation Little Saturn in January–February 1943 and may have been destroyed at that time.

The 6th SS Police Regiment was reformed in October 1944 in Hungary. Its first and second battalions were formed by the redesignation of II and III Battalions of the 1st SS Police Regiment although its third and fourth battalions were newly raised. The regimental headquarters was destroyed during the Siege of Budapest in early 1945; the survivors were in Soviet prisoner of war camps by 11 February, but its battalions appear to have survived the siege.
