= Operation Zauberflöte =

1943 security operation by German forces

Operation Zauberflöte or Operation Magic Flute (German: Unternehmen Zauberflöte) was a 1943 security operation by the German forces in the occupied Minsk, Belarus (Reichskommissariat Ostland). As part of the Bandenbekämpfung (bandit fighting) security doctrine, the operation was conducted by units of the Wehrmacht and the SS Police under the command of Gerret Korsemann, the Higher SS and Police Leader for Central Russia.

== Planning and goals ==
The operation, slated for 17−22 April 1943, envisaged the search of the city, including 130,000 dwellings, for "bandits, Bolshevik terror and saboteur troops, operatives and helpers". The result would be the eradication of resistance within the city and the registration of fugitives for punishment or deportation to Germany.

The operation was directed by Gerret Korsemann, the Higher SS and Police Leader for Central Russia. The units assigned to Zauberflöte included:

- Elements of the 141st Reserve Division of the Wehrmacht
- Minsk military garrison troops
- SS-Sonderbataillon Dirlewanger
- 2nd SS Police Regiment
- 13th SS Police Regiment

== Implementation and results ==
The operation commenced at 04:00 on 17 April 1943, under the cover of darkness to maximise the effect of surprise for the sweep of the first city district. By the evening of 18 April, the army completed the encirclement of the city centre, which allowed the SS police units to conduct searches of dwellings and ruins. The SS-Sonderbataillon Dirlewanger surrounded the Minsk Ghetto and provided guards to the labour columns leaving the ghetto. Korsemann instructed the battalion that plunder would be severely punished.

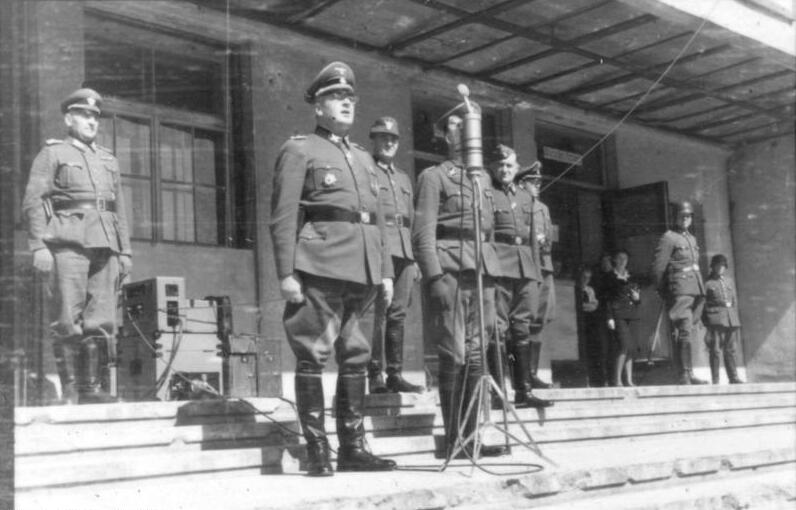
Bach-Zelewski giving a speech, Minsk, 1943

The operation was declared a success by Bandenbekämpfung chief, Erich von dem Bach-Zelewski, who was visiting the city. The result included processing of 76,000 persons, with 52,000 taken to collection points for further processing; 550 were deported to Germany. Another 700 people were sent to labour camps in Minsk, 39 people were arrested and two killed.

A total of 22,000 persons were determined to be travelling by rail without tickets. The commander of the army patrol service at the Reichskommissariat Ostland praised the results of the operation and demanded regular raids at railway stations. To celebrate the success of the operation, the SS Police conducted a parade, where Bach-Zelewski gave a speech.

== Bibliography ==
- Blood, Philip W. (2006). Hitler's Bandit Hunters: The SS and the Nazi Occupation of Europe. Potomac Books. ISBN 978-1-59797-021-1.
- Gerlach, Christian (2000). Kalkulierte Morde: Die Deutsche Wirtschafts- und Vernichtungspolitik in Weißrußland 1941 bis 1944 [Calculated Murder: German Economic and Annihilation policy in Belarus 1941–1944]. Hamburg: Hamburger Edition. ISBN 978-3-930908-63-9.
