= Belaruskaya Gazeta =

Pro-fascist collaborationist newspaper in Minsk, Belarus

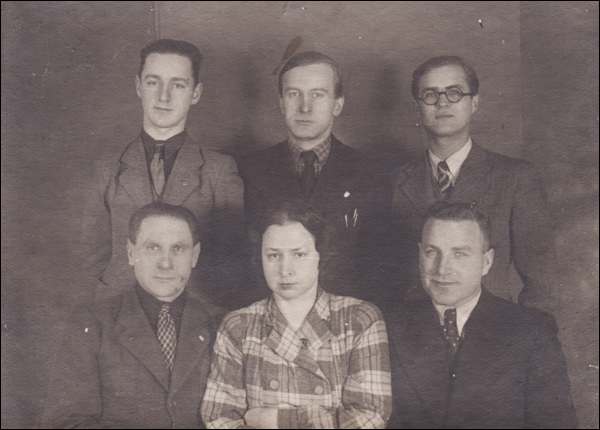
Editors of Belaruskaya Gazeta pictured in December 1942. From left to right, top row: Vladimir Kushal, Anton Adamovich, Karalenko. Bottom row: Uładzisłau Kazłouski, Natallia Arsiennieva, Alexei Senkevich

Belaruskaya Gazeta ("Belarusian Newspaper"; Belarusian: Беларуская газэта; Russian: Белорусская газета) was a pro-fascist collaborationist newspaper published in Minsk in the Belarusian language from 27 July 1941 to 28 June 1944 under the control of the German occupation authorities. From its first publication until 5 February 1942, it was called Menskaya Gazeta ("Minsk Newspaper"; Belarusian: Менская газэта). It was the largest Belarusian anti-Soviet periodical during the Second World War. The editors of the newspaper were Alexei Senkevich, Uładzisłau Kazłouski, A. Demchenko, Mikołaj Shkelenok and Anton Adamovich. A total of 272 issues were published.

== Content ==
Belaruskaya Gazeta was distributed on the territory of the Generalbezirk Weißruthenien of Reichskommissariat Ostland. The publication of the newspaper was aimed at consolidating the Belarusian people on an anti-Soviet platform, fighting Bolshevism, and ideological support for the German occupation regime. The newspaper was distinguished by ardent nationalism and chauvinism, hatred of Russians, Poles and Jews, searches for the "Aryan roots" of the Belarusian people, an attempt to prove their allegedly historically conditioned attraction to Germany, identification of Marxism and Zionism, etc.

The first issue of the Menskaya Gazeta (21 September 1941) contained two large articles constantly referring to the "Jewish Question". The first of them, "Traces of Years", written by the Belarusian poet Vladimir Duditsky, summed up the twenty-year history of Soviet Belarus, or, as the author wrote, "Bolshevik‑Jewish domination" in the country.

In another issue of Menskaya Gazeta, an article was published by U. Glybinny (pseudonym of Vladimir Seduro), "In the hands of the executioners," also soaked through with anti-Semitism, for example, "the Bolsheviks as oppressors of the people in the interests of the Jews."

The newspaper published speeches and articles by the leaders of Nazi Germany, orders, appeals and announcements of the occupation authorities, reviews of the Nazi press, covered and commented on the events on the fronts of World War II, the international situation, promoted the economic and political activities of the occupation administration, praised Nazi Germany as an ideal state. Belarusskaya Gazeta informed about the activities of nationalist organizations of the Belarusian People's Self-Help, the Byelorussian Home Defence, the Belarusian Central Rada, the Union of Belarusian Youth, the role and significance of which she greatly extolled, and commented on any of their actions with delight. Newspaper paid a lot of attention to the problems of language policy, teaching in primary schools, teacher training, education of national identity, organization of cultural life in the field.

The newspaper published popular essays on the history and culture of Belarus, many of which were politicized and close to journalism, materials on the history of Belarusian emigration, about Belarusian traditions and rituals, the origin of Belarusian symbols, etc. On the pages of the newspaper were placed memoirs of participants of the Russian Civil War, materials about Stalin's crimes (articles about the Katyn massacre, NKVD camps, memoirs, testimonies of former prisoners, etc.), literary-critical articles, reviews, etc.

For the first time, some texts of the repressed dead writers of the USSR were printed: the poem "Tastament" ("Testament") of Uładzimir Žyłka and the novel "Vilna Communards" (in excerpts) of Maksim Haretski.

A number of publications of the newspaper of the end of 1943 — beginning of 1944 are saturated with pessimism, doom, disappointment in the chosen path. However, these sentiments did not affect the anti-Soviet direction of the publication.
