= Byelorussian collaboration with Nazi Germany =

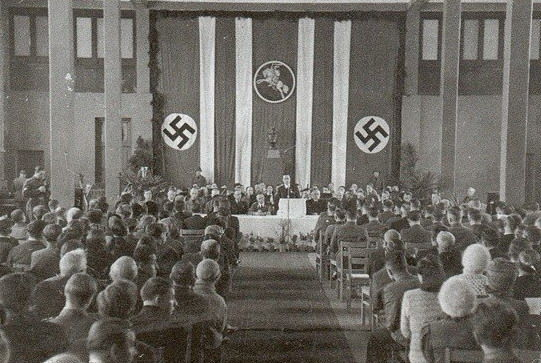
Belarusian Central Council, a pro-Nazi puppet government within Belarus operating from Minsk 22 January 1944.

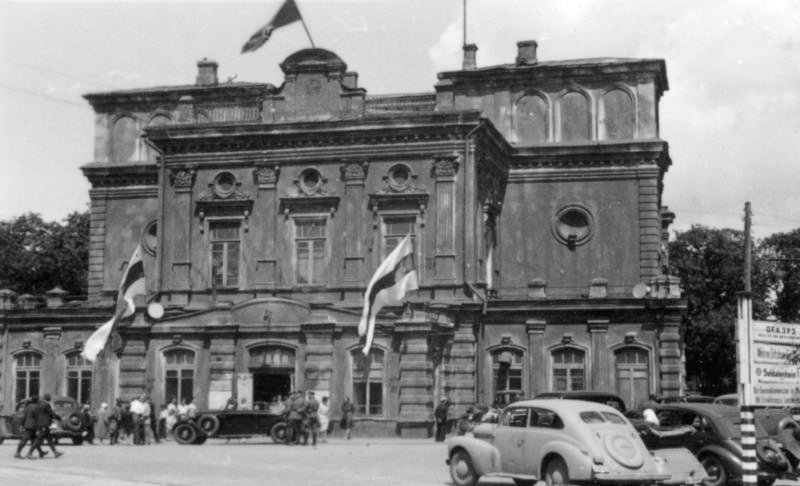
Headquarters of the Belarusian Central Rada June 1943.

During World War II, some Belarusians collaborated with the invading Axis powers. Until the beginning of Operation Barbarossa in 1941, the territory of Belarus was under control of the Soviet Union, as the Byelorussian Soviet Socialist Republic. However, memories of Soviet repressions in Belarus and collectivization, as well as of the Polonization and discrimination against Belarusians under the Second Polish Republic were still fresh.

Many Belarusians wanted an independent nation and co-operated with the invaders in hopes that Nazi Germany would allow them to have their own independent state after the war ended. Early cases of collaboration with other foreign powers occurred in interwar Belarus, with an example being Radasłaŭ Astroŭski (who would later collaborate with Nazi Germany) collaborating with the Soviet Union and Communist Party of Western Belorussia.

Belarusian organizations never had administrative control over the territory of Belarus. The real power was held by the German civil and military administrations. The collaborationist Belarusian Central Council, presenting itself as a Belarusian governmental body, was formed in Minsk a few months before Belarus was retaken by the Soviet Army.

Before the war, the Belarusian National Socialist Party was formed by a small group of Belarusian nationalists in Polish-controlled Western Belorussia in 1933. The group was far less influential than other Belarusian political parties in interwar Poland such as the Belarusian Peasants' and Workers' Union and the Belarusian Christian Democracy. The Belarusian National Socialist Party was banned by the Polish authorities in 1937. Party leaders left for Berlin and became among the first advisers to the Germans at the onset of Operation Barbarossa.

== Administration ==
- Reichskommissariat Ostland
  - Belarusian Central Council
  - Zuyev Republic

== Belarusian military and paramilitary units in the German army ==
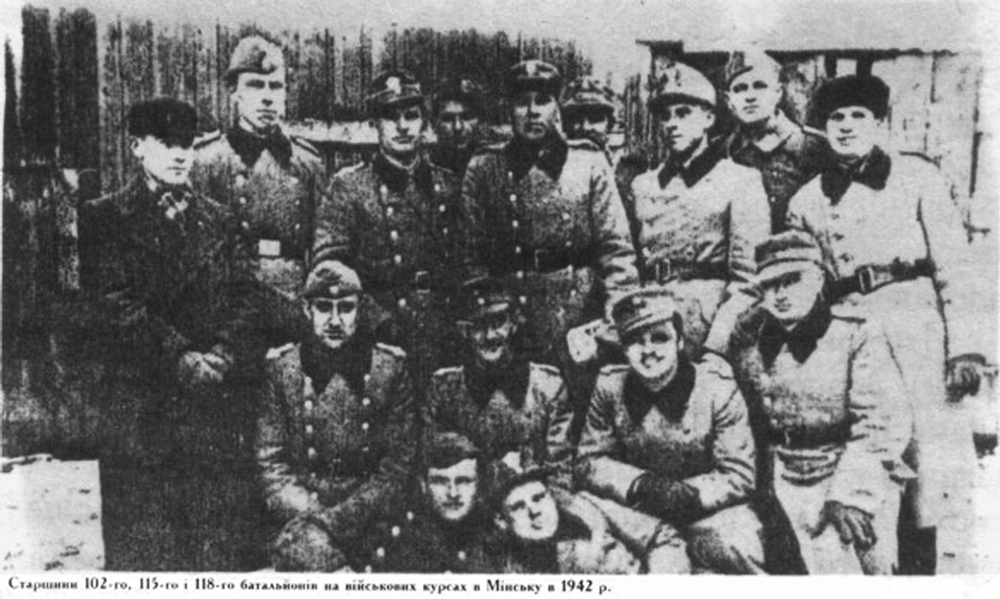
Minsk training base in 1942, leaders of the Schutzmannschaft Battalions 102 and 115, as well as the Battalion 118 ready for service in Reichskommissariat Ostland

- Belarusian Abwehr/Brandenburg Sabouteur agents
- Vorkommando Einsatzgruppe B, also Vorkommando Moskau
- Byelorussian Auxiliary Police
- Byelorussian Home Defence (Belarusian Interior Guard – BKA)
- 29. Waffen-Grenadier-Division der SS RONA (russische Nr. 1)
- 30. Waffen-Grenadier-Division der SS (weißruthenische Nr. 1)
- weissruthenische Waffen-Grenadier-Regiment der SS 75
- I./weissruthenische Waffen-Grenadier-Regiment der SS 75
- II./weissruthenische Waffen-Grenadier-Regiment der SS 75
- III./weissruthenische Waffen-Grenadier-Regiment der SS 75
- 13th weissruthenische battalion of SD
- weissruthenische Artillerie-Abteilung
- weissruthenische Panzerjäger-Abteilung
- weissruthenische Reiter-Schwadron
- Waffen Sturmbrigade Belarus
- "Čorny Kot" ("Black Cat") Special undercover unit

== German commanders and officers associated with Belarus ==
- SS Officer Dr. Franz Six
- General Reinhard Gehlen, Chief of German East-Front Intelligence, with offices in Smolensk
- Generalkommissar Wilhelm Kube
- SS General Curt von Gottberg
- SS Colonel Otto Skorzeny
- SS-Standartenführer Hans Siegling

== Political leaders ==
- Radasłaŭ Astroŭski - Mayor of Smolensk and later president of the Belarusian Central Rada
- Jury Sabaleŭski - Major of Baranavičy and vice-president of the Belarusian Central Council
- Mikałaj Łapicki - Orthodox priest and editor-in-chief of the Ranica newspaper
- Vacłaŭ Ivanoŭski - Mayor of Minsk
- Ivan Yermachenka - local political advisor
- Stanisłaŭ Stankievič - Mayor of Barysaŭ
- Emmanuel Jasiuk - Mayor of Klecak
- Jaŭchim Kipel - president of the Second All-Belarusian Rada Congress
- Ivan Kasiak - Belarusian provincial governor
- Jury Bartyševič - Minister of Administration of occupation Astroŭski government
- Anton Adamovič - member of self-help Belarusian organization
- Mikola Abramchyk - editor of Ranica newspaper
- Stanisłaŭ Hrynkievič
- Piotra Orsa - Minister of Economics and Agriculture

== Military commanders ==
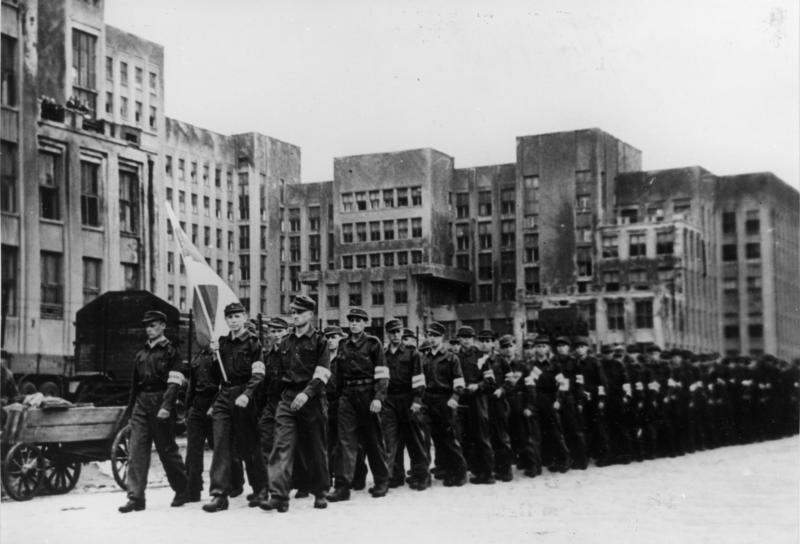
German-collaborationist Biełaruskaja Krajovaja Abarona, Minsk, June 1944.

- Źmicier Kasmovič, the police chief of Smolensk
- Francišak Kušal, Commander of local BKA police forces
- Michał Vituška, Commander of "Black Cat" special unit
- Colonel Alexander Buglaj

== Political organizations ==
- Belarusian Independence Party
- Belarusian National Socialist Party
- Self-help Belarusian Groups
- Belarusian affairs office
- Belarusian "Ventruensausschuss" administrative-political organization
- First Zentralrat political organization

== Media ==
- Ranica, a Berlin-based Belarusian newspaper
- Belaruskaya Gazeta

== See also ==
- Belarusian resistance during World War II
- Occupation of Belarus by Nazi Germany
- Collaboration with the Axis Powers during World War II
