= Zalesie, Sokółka County =

Zalesie
- Village
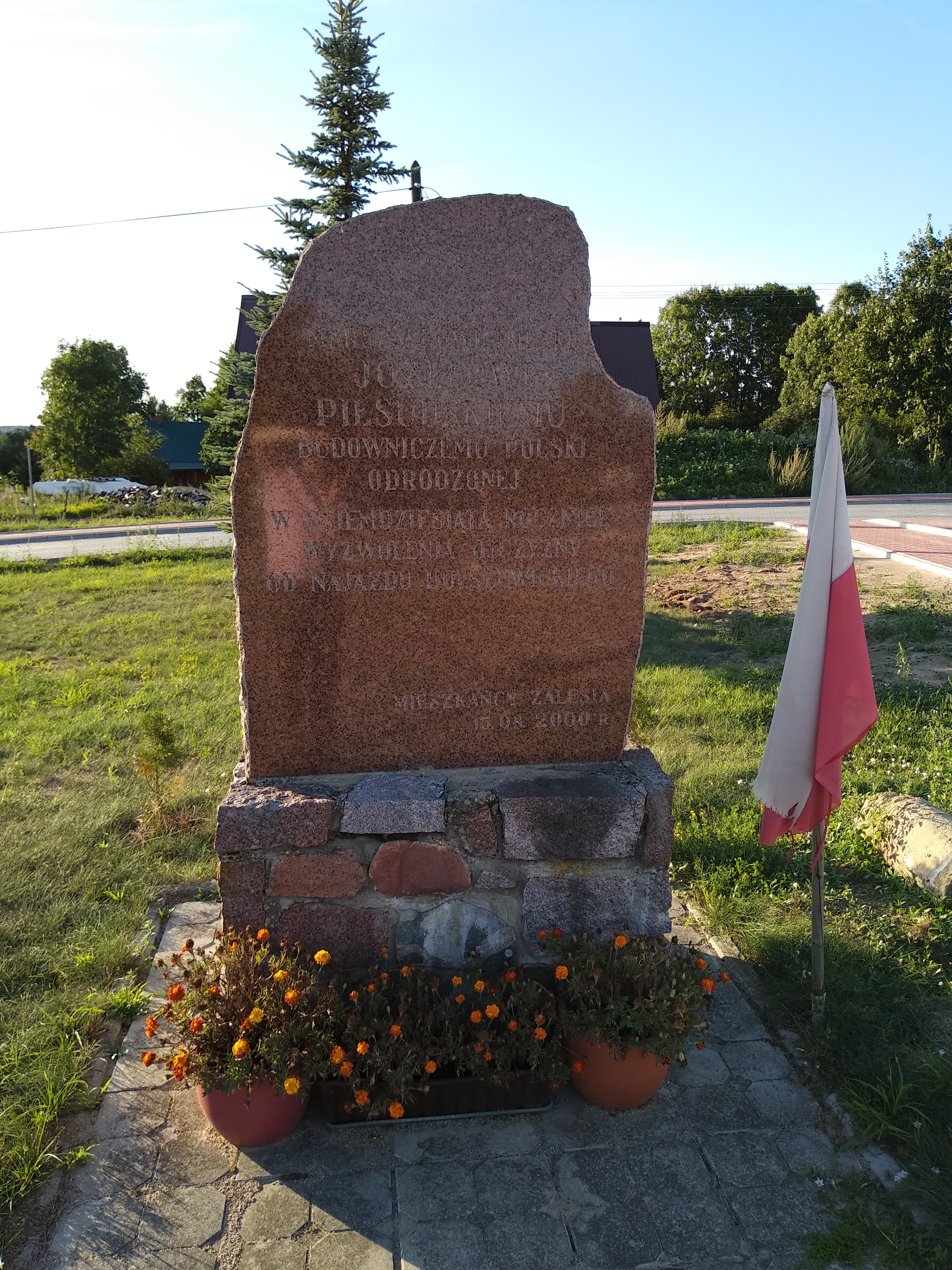
- Monument to Józef Piłsudski in Zalesie

- Location within Poland
- Coordinates: 53°33′N 23°33′E
- Country: Poland
- Voivodeship: Podlaskie
- County: Sokółka
- Gmina: Sidra
- Population: 160

Zalesie [zaˈlɛɕɛ] is a village in the administrative district of Gmina Sidra, within Sokółka County, Podlaskie Voivodeship, in north-eastern Poland.

== Notable residents ==
- Uładzisłau Kazłouski, Politician
