= 12th SS Police Regiment =

- Active: 1942–1944
- Country: Nazi Germany
- Branch: Schutzstaffel
- Type: Security
- Size: Regiment
- Garrison/HQ: Wehrkreis X

The 12th SS Police Regiment (German: SS-Polizei-Regiment 3) was initially named the 12th Police Regiment (12. SS-Polizei-Regiment) when it was formed in 1942 from existing Order Police units (Ordnungspolizei) in Germany. It was redesignated as an SS unit in early 1943. The regimental headquarters was disbanded in early 1944, but its battalions remained in service.

== Formation and organization ==
The regiment was formed in July 1942 in Hamburg as the 12th Police Regiment. Police Battalion 103 (Polizei-Bataillon 103), Police Battalion 104 and Police Battalion 105 were redesignated as the regiment's first through third battalions, respectively. All of the police regiments were redesignated as SS police units on 24 February 1943. The regiment's third battalion was redesignated as the third battalion of the 3rd SS Police Regiment in 1943 and was reformed. In April, I battalion was reformed into a SS Police Infantry Battalion (SS-Polizei-Infanterie Regiment). III Battalion was sent to Italy in October where it was attached to the 15th SS Police Regiment and remained in Italy through December 1944. The headquarters was disbanded on 11 April 1944. II Battalion was transferred to Hungary that same month and was redesignated as the first battalion of the 1st SS Police Regiment in August.

== War crimes ==
The regiment has been implicated in eight incidents of war crimes in Italy from March to September 1944 with an estimated 85 civilians killed.

Members of the unit served as guards on Holocaust trains from Italian transit camps, taking political prisoners and captured partisans to camps in Germany and Jewish prisoners to Auschwitz.
