= 13th SS Police Regiment =

- Country: Nazi Germany
- Branch: Schutzstaffel
- Type: Security
- Size: Regiment
- Garrison/HQ: Wehrkreis XI

The 13th SS Police Regiment (German: SS-Polizei-Regiment 13) was initially named the 13th Police Regiment (Polizei-Regiment 13) when it was formed in 1942 by the redesignation of Police Regiment Centre (Polizei-Regiment Mitte) for security duties on the Eastern Front. It was redesignated as an SS unit in early 1943.

== Formation and organization ==
The regiment was formed in July 1942 in western Russia from Police Regiment Centre. All of the police regiments were redesignated as SS police units on 24 February 1943. The regiment was reinforced by an artillery battery in 1943–1944.

== Activities ==
The 13th SS Police Regiment participated in Operation Zauberflöte in April 1943 in Minsk, Belarus (Reichskommissariat Ostland). This was an operation intended to cordon off the city so that it could be searched for "bandits, Bolshevik terror and saboteur troops, operatives and helpers" under the overall leadership of Gerret Korsemann, the Higher SS and Police Leader for Central Russia. It continued to operate in Belarus and western Russia on anti-partisan duties through April 1944; it had been transferred to Slovenia by August.
