= 4th Division (Reichswehr) =

- 4. Division
- Active: 1921–1934
- Disbanded: October 1934
- Country: Weimar Republic
- Branch: Reichsheer
- Type: Infantry
- Size: Division
- Part of: Gruppenkommando 1
- Garrison/HQ: Wehrkreis IV: Dresden

Commanders
- Notable commanders: Paul Hausser; Ludwig Beck

The 4th Division was a unit of the Reichswehr.

== Creation ==
In the Order of 31 July 1920 for the Reduction of the Army (to comply with the upper limits on the size of the military contained in the Treaty of Versailles), it was determined that in every Wehrkreis (military district) a division would be established by 1 October 1920. The 4th Division was formed in January 1921 out of the Reichswehr's 12th, 16th, and 19th, Brigades, all part of the former Übergangsheer (Transition Army).

It consisted of 3 infantry regiments: the 10th and 11th (Saxon) Infantry Regiments, and the 12th Infantry Regiment. It also included an artillery regiment, an engineering battalion, a signals battalion, a transportation battalion, and a medical battalion. It was subordinated to Gruppenkommando 1.

The commander of Wehrkreis IV was simultaneously the commander of the 4th Division. For the leadership of the troops, an Infanterieführer and an Artillerieführer were appointed, both subordinated to the commander of the division.

The unit ceased to exist as such after October 1934, and its subordinate units were transferred to one of the new 21 divisions created in that year.

== Divisional commanders ==
- General der Infanterie Paulus von Stolzmann (1 October 1920 - 16 June 1921)
- Generalleutnant Alfred Müller (16 June 1921 - 29 October 1925)
- General der Infanterie Richard von Pawelsz (29 October 1925 - 1 June 1926)
- General der Infanterie Erich Wöllwarth (1 June 1926 - 1 January 1929)
- General der Infanterie Edwin von Stülpnagel (1 January 1929 - 1 November 1931)
- Generalleutnant Curt Freiherr von Gienanth (1 November 1931 - 30 September 1933)

=== Infantrieführers ===
- Generalleutnant Paul Hausser (1 November 1930 - 31 January 1932)

=== Artillerieführers ===
- Generalmajor Ludwig Beck (1 February 1932 - 30 September 1932)

== Garrison ==
The divisional headquarters was in Dresden.
