= Uładzisłau Kazłouski =

Belarusian writer, politician, and Axis collaborator

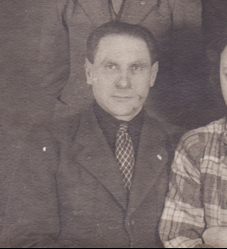
- Born: 29 June 1896; Zalesie, Grodno Governorate, Russian Empire
- Died: 18 November 1943 (aged 47); Minsk, Generalbezirk Weißruthenien
- Other name: Kazłouszczyk
- Occupations: journalist, politician, poet, reserve lieutenant
- Years active: 1930–1943
- Notable work: "Biełaruski hazety"

Uładzisłau Kazłouski (Belarusian: Уладзісла́ў Казло́ўскі; Russian: Владисла́в Козло́вский 29 June 1896 – 18 November 1943) was a Belarusian publicist, publisher, poet, critic journalist, activist and politician.

== Early life ==
Kazłouski was born in the village of Zalesie, in the Grodno Governorate of the Russian Empire (now part of Podlaskie Voivodship in Poland). He studied at the Catholic seminary in Vilnius from 1916 to 1919. Upon returning from school in Vilnius, Kazłouski was confronted by the Belarusian national revival.

== Career ==
Kazłouski became an organizer for Belarusian schools in the district of Sokółka. He was a member of the leadership of the Belarusian Party in Włościańska. Kazłouski later became an instructor at the Belarusian National Committee in Minsk. As an instructor, he led cultural and social activities in the district of Ihumeńskim.

In the early 1920s, Kazłouski joined the newly formed Belarusian battalions. Early in his career, Kazłouski was commanded to enter the cadet school of Warsaw. Upon graduating, Kazłouski became a shooting instructor at a Belarusian battalion. Kazłouski served in the Polish Army from 1921 to 1930, leaving as a reserve lieutenant.

Kazłouski settled in Vilnius. There he organized the Gymnastics Society "Hajsak" and published articles on the physical culture of Belarusian youth. At the same time, he served as secretary of the Belarusian National Committee and was active in the Belarusian Institute of Economy and Culture.

In November 1933, Kazłouski and Fabian Akińczycem founded the Belarusian National-Socialist Party. Kazłouski edited its press organ New Plot Type, which was confiscated multiple times by the Polish authorities. Up until 1937, Kazłouski published numerous articles as well as poems for the party's press under the pseudonym "Kazłouszczyk".

In 1934, Kazłouski became secretary of the Belarusian National Committee in Vilnius. In the autumn of 1939, he became secretary of the Belarusian self-help groups where he worked with the Lithuanian Red Cross.

During World War II he worked together with the German Nazi Party.

In the autumn of 1941, Kazłouski moved to Minsk. From 1941 to 1943, he worked as a redactor of Belaruskaya Gazeta. By 1942 he began the publishing of "Biełaruski hasty". Alongside Akińczycem, Kazłouski attempted to reactivate the Belarusian Party of National-Socialism, but failed to obtain the consent of the German authorities. Kazłouski later co-organized and took part in the leadership of the Belarusian People's Self-Help. He was assassinated by Soviet partisans in November 1943.
