= Reserve Police Battalion 33 =

- Polizei Front-Bataillon 33 "Ostland"
- Active: August 1941 – 1943
- Country: Nazi Germany
- Branch: Order Police
- Type: Order Police battalion
- Role: Nazi security warfare The Holocaust in Poland; The Holocaust in Belarus; The Holocaust in Ukraine
- Part of: Police unit under SS command

Commanders
- Notable commanders: Herberts Brašnevics; Heinrich Stunde; Paul Laamann; SS-Obersturmführer Rudolf Steinpick; Hugo Siim

Reserve Police Battalion 33, "Ostland", (German: Polizei-Bataillon 33, also: Polizei-Bataillon "Ostland") was a militarised unit of the German Ordnungspolizei (uniformed police) in World War II. For the first three months between August and October 1941 – according to Latvian Museum of Occupation – its official name was Police Reserve Battalion "Ostland" (Polizei-Reserve-Bataillon "Ostland") and, from October 1941, the 33rd Reserve Police Battalion (Reserve-Polizei-Bataillon 33). The 1st Company of Battalion 33 was known as Ostlandkompanie. It was composed largely of Estonian Volksdeutsche.

The battalion originated in Stahnsdorf, and was formed up at Frankfurt an der Oder in August 1941. It carried out so-called anti-partisan operations and mass shootings. According to historians referring to the SS-Hauptamt's document No. 8699/42, the Polizei-Bataillon 33 resided in the Reichskommissariat Ukraine in 1941-1942 and took part of the mass shootings of the Jews. As reported in May, 1942 to Berlin, 1,000 Jews were murdered in Minsk; as reported on July 15, 1942 another thousand Jews were shot in the same place; as reported on June 27, 1942, 4,000 Jews of the Słonim Ghetto were murdered on the outskirts of Słonim; as reported on July 28, 1942, another 6,000 Jews were killed in Minsk.

== History ==
Also known as the Police Front-Battalion "Ostland" or Polizei Front-Bataillon "Ostland", Polizei-Bataillon 33; Field Post Number: 47769 and 47797) or the Ostland special SS-battalion was one of the Order Police battalions that served in World War II under the command of the Schutzstaffel (SS). The battalion was established either in August or October 1941. According to the researcher Rolf Michaelis referring to the SS-Hauptamt's document No. 8699/42, the Police Front-Battalion "Ostland" resided in the Reichskommissariat Ukraine in 1941-1942 and took part in the mass shooting of Jews. On June 28, 1941 a Polish town of Równe was captured by Nazi Germany, which later established the city as the administrative centre of the Reichskommissariat Ukraine. July 1941: The 1st company was in Frankfurt. The rest of the battalion was in Równe, Poland. October 1941: sent to Lwów, Poland. At the time, roughly half of Równe's inhabitants were Jewish. About 23,000 of these people were taken to a pine grove in Sosenki and slaughtered by the 1st company of the Police Front-Battalion "Ostland" between the November 6, and 8, 1941 (1st company). A ghetto was established for the remaining ca 5,000 Jews.

As reported on May 11, 1942, ca 1,000 Jews were murdered in Minsk. On July 13–14, 1942, the remaining population of the Równe ghetto - about 5,000 Jews - was sent by train some 70 kilometres north to Kostopol where they were murdered by the 1st company of the Police Front-Battalion "Ostland" in a quarry near woods outside the town. The Równe ghetto was subsequently liquidated. As reported on July 14, 1942: The battalion or elements of it provided security along with the Ukrainische Hilfspolizei for a transport of the Jews from the Riga Ghetto to the Riga Central Station using the wagons (1st company). July 15, 1942 another thousand Jews were murdered in the same place. As reported on June 27, 1942, ca 8,000 Jews of the Słonim Ghetto were murdered on the outskirts of Słonim. As reported on July 28, 1942, ca 6,000 Jews were murdered in Minsk. In November 1942 the Police Battalion Ostland together with an artillery regiment, and three other German Order Police battalions under the command of the SS and police commander Otto von Oelhafen, took part in a joint anti-partisan operation near Owrucz with over 50 villages burnt down and over 1,500 people executed. In a village 40 people were burnt alive for revenge for the killing of the SS-Untersturmführer Türnpu(u). February 1943: In Revel, Estonia with Polizei Füsilier Bataillon 293. By March 31, 1943, the Estnische Legion had 37 officers, 175 noncoms and 62 privates of the Ostland special battalion.

== See also ==
- Reserve Police Battalion 101
