= 15th SS Police Regiment =

- Country: Nazi Germany
- Branch: Schutzstaffel
- Type: Security warfare
- Size: Regiment
- Garrison/HQ: Wehrkreis X

The 15th SS Police Regiment (German: SS-Polizei-Regiment 15) was initially named the 15th Police Regiment (Polizei-Regiment 15) when it was formed in 1942 from existing Order Police units (Ordnungspolizei) to conduct security warfare behind the Eastern Front. The regiment was destroyed in January 1943 and its personnel was used to reconstitute it in Norway several months later from existing police units. The regiment was transferred to Italy in late 1943 and remained there for the rest of the war.

== Operational history ==
The regiment was formed in July 1942 in Russia from Police Battalion 305, Police Battalion 306 and Police Battalion 310 which were redesignated as the regiment's first through third battalions, respectively. Between 29 October and 1 November, 10 Company of the Third Battalion helped to liquidate the ghetto in Pinsk, Belarus, killing an estimated 20,000 Jews. I Battalion was redesignated as III Battalion of the 16th Police Regiment later in the year and was later replaced by II Battalion of the 28th Police Regiment from Norway. The regiment was ordered to be rebuilt in Norway on 29 March 1943 with the survivors consolidated into I and II Battalions. III Battalion was intended to be the redesignated IV Battalion of the 27th SS Police Regiment, but I Battalion of the 27th Regiment was ultimately used instead. In July the headquarters and I Battalion were garrisoned in Sarpsborg, II Battalion was in Mysen and III Battalion was stationed in Bergen.

The regiment was transferred to Italy in late 1943 with the headquarters stationed in Vercelli, I Battalion in Turin, II Battalion garrisoned in Milan and III Battalion located in Trieste. It was later reinforced by an anti-tank company and a rocket-launcher battery.

The unit controlled two ethnic SS Police units, the SS Police Regiment Bozen and the SS Police Regiment Brixen engaged in security warfare in Italy.

== War crimes ==
The regiment has been implicated in twenty-six incidents of war crimes in Italy from December 1943 to February 1945 with almost 200 civilians killed.
