= 28th SS Police Regiment Todt =

- Country: Nazi Germany
- Branch: Schutzstaffel
- Type: Security
- Size: Regiment
- Garrison/HQ: Wehrkreis VI

The 28th SS Police Regiment Todt (German: SS-Polizei-Regiment 28 Todt) was initially named the 28th Police Regiment (Polizei-Regiment 28) when it was formed in mid-1942 from the existing Order Police (Ordnungspolizei) units for security duties in Occupied Norway. All of its units were transferred to other regiments shortly after forming; it was reformed as the 28th Police Regiment Todt later that year. It was redesignated as an SS unit in early 1943.

== Formation and organization ==
The regiment was formed in July 1942 in Norway with Police Battalion 252 (Polizei-Bataillon 252), and Police Battalion 253 being redesignated as the regiment's first and second battalions, respectively. Police Battalion 313 was briefly redesignated as the regiment's third battalion before it became III Battalion, Police Regiment 14 later in July or August. Shortly after that, the I Battalion became III/Police Regiment 17 and II Battalion became I/Police Regiment 15 and the regiment was effectively disbanded.

It was reformed in November as the 28th Police Regiment Todt, although the regimental headquarters was not formed until 29 March 1943, using Police Battalions 62 and 69 as the regiment's first and second battalions, respectively. III Battalion was formed from the Fourth Company of Police Battalion 62 and the Police Special Company Todt (Polizei-Sonder-Kompanie Todt). All of the police regiments were redesignated as SS police units on 24 February 1943. The regiment was consolidated in France by August and was then transferred to Slovenia in February 1944 where it remained for the rest of the war.
