= Police Battalion 310 =

- Polizeibattalion 310
- Active: 1941–
- Country: Nazi Germany
- Role: Nazi security warfare Participation in the Holocaust
- Size: Battalion
- Part of: Order Police under SS command

The Police Battalion 310 (Polizeibattalion 310) was a formation of the Order Police (uniformed police) during the Nazi era. During the Soviet-German war of 1941–45, it was deployed in German-occupied areas of the Soviet Union, as part of Nazi Germany's security forces tasked with "bandit-fighting". Alongside other SS and police units, it participated in the Holocaust and was responsible for large-scale crimes against humanity targeting civilian populations.

== Background and formation ==
The German Order Police was a key instrument of the security apparatus of Nazi Germany. In the prewar period, Heinrich Himmler, the head of the SS, and Kurt Daluege, chief of the Order Police, cooperated in transforming the police force of the Weimar Republic into militarised formations ready to serve the regime's aims of conquest and racial annihilation. Police troops were first formed into battalion-sized formations for the invasion of Poland, where they were deployed for security and policing purposes, also taking part in executions and mass deportations.

Twenty-three Order Police battalions were slated to take part in the 1941 invasion of the Soviet Union, Operation Barbarossa. Two battalions were assigned to support the Einsatzgruppen, the mobile death squads of the SS, and the Organisation Todt, the military construction group. The goals of the police battalions were to secure the rear by eliminating the remnants of the enemy forces, guarding the prisoners of war, and protecting the lines of communications. Their instructions also included, as Daluege stated, the "combat of criminal elements, above all political elements". Comprising about 550 men, the battalion was raised from recruits mobilised from the 1905–1915 year groups. They were led by career police professionals, steeped in the ideology of Nazism, driven by anti-semitism and anti-Bolshevism.

== Operational history ==
In the summer of 1942, Police Battalion 310 became part of the 15th Police Regiment formed in the occupied Soviet Union for Bandenbekämpfung ("bandit-fighting") duties.

The battalion took part in the liquidation of the Brest Ghetto on 15–16 October 1942 in Brest, Belarus. The formation, alongside the Polish auxiliary police forces and the Brest branch office of the Security Police, cordoned off the ghetto and herded its inhabitants together. Many were shot on the spot. At least 15,000 Jews were transported to a secluded location near the village of Bronnaya Gora where they were shot. In total, approximately 19,000 Jews were murdered during the dissolution of the Brest Ghetto.

Between 29 October and 1 November, 10 Company of the battalion took part in the liquidation of the Pinsk Ghetto, where an estimated 20,000 Jews were murdered.

== Aftermath ==
The Order Police as a whole had not been declared a criminal organisation by the Allies, unlike the SS, and its members were able to reintegrate into society largely unmolested, with many returning to police careers in Austria and West Germany.

== Bibliography ==
- Lewy, Guenter (2017). Perpetrators: The World of the Holocaust Killers. New York: Oxford University Press. ISBN 978-0-19066-113-7.
- Megargee, Geoffrey P., ed. (2012). The United States Holocaust Memorial Museum Encyclopedia of Camps and Ghettos, 1933–1945. Vol. II: Ghettos in German-Occupied Eastern Europe. Bloomington: Indiana University Press. ISBN 978-0-253-00202-0.
- Kay, Alex J. (2021). Empire of Destruction: A History of Nazi Mass Killing. New Haven and London: Yale University Press. ISBN 978-0-300-26253-7.
- Porter, T.E. (2011). "Hitler's Rassenkampf in the East". Crimes of State Past and Present: Government-Sponsored Atrocities and International Legal Responses. Routledge. pp. 54–84. ISBN 9781317986829.
- Showalter, Dennis (2005). "Foreword". Hitler's Police Battalions: Enforcing Racial War in the East. Kansas City: University Press of Kansas. ISBN 978-0-7006-1724-1.
- Westermann, Edward B. (2005). Hitler's Police Battalions: Enforcing Racial War in the East. Kansas City: University Press of Kansas. ISBN 978-0-7006-1724-1.
