= 1st SS Police Regiment =

- Country: Nazi Germany
- Branch: Schutzstaffel
- Type: Security
- Size: Regiment
- Garrison/HQ: Wehrkreis III

The 1st SS Police Regiment (German: SS-Polizei-Regiment 1) was initially named the 1st Police Regiment (Polizei-Regiment 1) when it was formed in 1942 from existing Order Police (Ordnungspolizei) units for security duties in Occupied Europe. It was redesignated as an SS unit in early 1943. Later that year it was disbanded and its battalions were reassigned to other SS Police units. The regiment was reformed in late 1944 in Hungary, but was absorbed by 35th SS and Police Grenadier Division (35. SS und Polizei Grenadier Division) in early 1945.

== Formation and organization ==
The regimental headquarters was formed in July 1942 in Berlin and was subordinated to the Polizei Abschnitt Spree which was the police command for all SS-police units in and around the Berlin capitol area. The regiment comprised three police battalions as well as a signals and headquarters unit. A police tank company was planned, but never formed. Police Battalion 2 (Polizei-Bataillon 2) was assigned as its 1st battalion, but it was in northern Russia at that time. It was withdrawn to Berlin around August or September for reorganization. The regiment's 2nd battalion was Police Battalion 3, but this assignment was only nominal as the battalion was scattered along the length of the Eastern Front and remained that way until the bulk of it was withdrawn to Mährisch Ostrau, Protectorate of Bohemia and Moravia, (now Ostrava, Czech Republic) in late 1942 where it served as cadre for the 1st Battalion of the 36th Police Rifle Regiment (Polizei-Schützen Regiment 36) in mid-1943. Police Battalion 10 was in Upper Carniola, Slovenia, when it was redesignated as the regiment's third battalion, and apparently remained there until early 1943. All of the police regiments were redesignated as SS-police units on 24 February 1943.

=== Activities ===
In late 1942, the headquarters and first battalion were deployed to the Eastern Front and attached to Army Group North while the second battalion remained attached to various security police units on the individual company level and the third battalion remained in Slovenia on anti-partisan duty. In early 1943, the first and third battalions were transferred to France where they were assigned to Polizei-Regiment Griese in Marseille, and were redesignated as the first and third battalions of the 14th SS Police Regiment in March, while the regimental HQ was disbanded.

The regiment was reformed in August 1944 in Hungary from the headquarters of the Polizei-Regiment zbV (zur besonderen Verwendung). Its battalions were taken from other police regiments, notably II./SS Pol.Rgt. 12, II./SS Pol.Rgt. 20 and III./SS Pol.Rgt. 21 as its first through third battalions, respectively. The latter two battalions were redesignated as the first and second battalions of the 6th SS Police Regiment in October while the regiment's second battalion was replaced by the assignment and redesignation of the Police Half-Battalion Hungary (Polizei Halb-Bataillon Ungarn). The regiment was ordered disbanded on 12 March 1945 and its personnel and equipment were absorbed by the SS and Police Grenadier Regiment 89 (SS und Polizei Grenadier Regiment 89) of the 35th SS and Police Grenadier Division.
