= Estonian Auxiliary Police =

Estonian collaborationist police units during World War II

- Eesti kaitsepataljonid Estnische Hilfspolizei
- Active: July 1941 – November 1944
- Allegiance: Nazi Germany
- Branch: Schutzmannschaft
- Type: Auxiliary police
- Role: Rear security
- Size: 23 Battalions
- Part of: Wehrmacht / Order Police / SS of Nazi Germany
- Engagements: Battle of Stalingrad; Battle for Narva Bridgehead; Battle of Emajõgi

Commanders
- Notable commanders: Harald Riipalu

Estonian Auxiliary Police (Estonian: Eesti kaitsepataljonid, Eesti politseipataljonid, German: Estnische Hilfspolizei) were Estonian police units that collaborated with Nazi Germany during World War II.

== Formation ==
Estonian units were first established on 25 August 1941, when under the order of Field Marshal Wilhelm Ritter von Leeb, commander of the Army Group North, Baltic states citizens were permitted to be recruited into Wehrmacht service and grouped into volunteer battalions for security duties. In this context, General Georg von Küchler, commander of the 18th Army, formed six Estonian volunteer guard units (Estnische Sicherungsgruppe, Eesti julgestusgrupp; numbered 181–186) on the basis of the Omakaitse squads (with its members contracted for one year).

After September 1941, the Oberkommando der Wehrmacht (Armed Forces High Command) started to establish the Estonian Auxiliary Police Battalions ("Schutzmannschaft" (Schuma)) in addition to the aforementioned units for Bandenbekämpfung (countering resistance and rear security) duties in the Army Group North Rear Area (Rückwärtiges Heeresgebiet Nord). During the war, 26 "Schuma" battalions were formed in Estonia, numbered from 29th to 45th, 50th, and from the 286th to 293rd. Unlike similar units deployed in the Reichskommissariat Ukraine and White Ruthenia, which were controlled by the Germans, the Estonian Auxiliary Police battalions were made up of national staff and included only one German monitoring officer. As of 1 October 1942, the Estonian Auxiliary Police forces comprised 10,400 men, with 591 Germans attached to them.

== Operational history ==
The police battalions were mostly engaged in the Wehrmacht Army Group Rear Area Command. The 37th and 40th battalions were employed on rear security duties in the Pskov Oblast, as was the 38th battalion in the Luga-Pskov-Gdov region. The 288th battalion was engaged in the suppression of the Ronson's Partisan Republic. Police Battalions 29, 31 and 32 fought in the Battle for Narva Bridgehead.

From 22 November to 31 December 1942 the 36th Estonian Police Battalion took part of the Battle of Stalingrad. On August 29, 1944 Police Battalions 37 and 38 participated in the fighting against the Soviet Tartu Offensive. As their largest operation, supported by the 3rd Battalion of the Estonian Waffen Grenadier Regiment 45, they destroyed the Kärevere bridgehead of two Soviet divisions west from Tartu and recaptured the Tallinn highway bridge over the Emajõgi by 30 August. The operation shifted the entire front back to the southern bank of the Emajõgi. This encouraged the II Army Corps to launch an operation attempting to recapture Tartu on 4 September.

== Police battalions ==
- 29. Eesti Politseipataljon – Estnische Polizei-Füsilier-Bataillon 29
- 30. Eesti Politseipataljon – Estnische Polizei-Füsilier-Bataillon 30
- 31. Eesti Politseipataljon – Estnische Polizei-Füsilier-Bataillon 31
- 32. Eesti Politseipataljon – Estnische Polizei-Füsilier-Bataillon 32
- 33. Eesti Politseipataljon – Estnische Polizei-Füsilier-Bataillon 33
- 34. Eesti Politsei Rindepataljon – Estnische Polizei-Front-Bataillon 34
- 35. Politsei Tagavarapataljon - Polizei-Ersatz-Bataillon 35
- 36th Estonian Police Battalion – Schutzmannschaft-Front-Bataillon nr. 36
- 37. Eesti Politseipataljon – Estnische Polizei-Bataillon 37
- 38. Eesti Politseipataljon - Estnische Polizei-Bataillon 38
- 39. Kaitse Vahipataljon Oberpahlen – Schutzmannschaft-Wacht-Bataillon nr. 39
- 40. Eesti Politseipataljon – Estnische Polizei-Bataillon 40
- 41. Kaitse Tagavarapataljon
- 42. Kaitse Pioneeripataljon – Schutzmannschaft-Pioneer-Bataillon 42
- 286. Politsei Jalaväepataljon – Polizei-Füsilier-Bataillon 286
- 287. Politsei Vahipataljon – Polizei-Wacht-Bataillon 287
- 288. Politsei Jalaväepataljon – Polizei-Füsilier-Bataillon 288
- 289. Politsei Jalaväepataljon – Polizei-Füsilier-Bataillon 289
- 290. Politsei Pioneeripataljon – Polizei Pionier-Bataillon 290
- 291. Politsei Jalaväepataljon – Polizei-Füsilier-Bataillon 291
- 292. Politsei Jalaväepataljon – Polizei-Füsilier-Bataillon 292
- 293. Politsei Jalaväepataljon – Polizei-Füsilier-Bataillon 293
- 521. Eesti Politseipataljon – Estnische Polizei-Füsilier-Bataillon 521

== See also ==
- Estonian Security Police

Other Auxiliary Police formations:

- Latvian Auxiliary Police
- Lithuanian Auxiliary Police
- Ukrainian Auxiliary Police
- Belarusian Auxiliary Police
