= Francesco Amilcare Dupanloup =

- Born: 6 April 1887; Savona, Kingdom of Italy
- Died: 25 April 1945 (aged 58); Pegli, Italy
- Military career
- Allegiance: Kingdom of Italy; Italian Social Republic
- Branch: Royal Italian Army; MVSN; Guardia Nazionale Repubblicana
- Rank: General
- Commands: Port Militia
- Conflicts: World War I; Battles of the Isonzo; Battle of Asiago
- Awards: Silver Medal of Military Valor (three times); Bronze Medal of Military Valor

Francesco Amilcare Dupanloup (Savona, 6 April 1887 – Pegli, 25 April 1945) was an Italian soldier and Fascist militant.

== Biography ==
During World War I, Dupanloup volunteered in the Royal Italian Army, fighting with the 41st Infantry Regiment "Modena" and rising in rank from Second Lieutenant to Captain. During the war he was awarded three Silver and one Bronze Medal of Military Valor, for actions on Mrzli Vrh in May and August 1915, on the Asiago plateau in May 1916 (in which he was seriously wounded) and near Gorizia in August 1917 (when he was again seriously wounded). Near the end of the war he was assigned to an Arditi unit, at his own request.

After the war, in February 1921 he joined the Italian Fasces of Combat and became the main leader of the Savonese squadristi. A few years later Dupanloup defined himself as "the first fascist in Savona". A member of the Associazione Nazionale Combattenti (National Combatants' Association), he repeatedly clashed with anti-fascist Cristoforo Astengo, president of the Savona section of the ANC from July 1921 to October 1922. In August 1922 he led the squadristi in the assault on the town hall of Savona, and two months later he participated in the march on Rome. A few months later he was elected president of the local section of the National Combatants' Association.

During the Fascist regime, Dupanloup was among the founders of the Port Militia, of which he became commander-general, with the rank of console generale (equivalent to Brigadier General) from its foundation till 1932. In 1931, however, he entered into conflict with other members of the National Fascist Party (from which he had been expelled twice during the 1920s, only to be later re-admitted) and was sentenced to confinement in Canelli for having constituted an unlikely dissident group by the name of "Teste di Moro" (Moor Heads), being replaced by Vittorio Raffaldi at the command of the Port Militia. He was later released but forced to retire from political life, and placed under the surveillance of the OVRA by secret agent Luca Osteria.

After the Armistice of Cassibile, Dupanloup joined the Italian Social Republic, with the rank of console generale of the reserve in the Republican National Guard, but did not play any active role in the new Fascist state. He died on April 25, 1945, while being arrested by the partisans; according to most sources he committed suicide with a gun when the partisans showed up at his door to arrest him.
