= Port Militia =

The Port Militia (Italian: Milizia Portuaria) was the branch of the Volunteer Militia for National Security tasked with guarding Italy's main ports and enforcing the law within port areas. It was founded in 1924 and reformed in 1927; its first commander-general was console generale Francesco Amilcare Dupanloup.

It was divided into four legions, based in Genoa, Trieste, Naples and Bari, with smaller detachments in Livorno, Savona, Ventimiglia, Albissola, Vado Ligure, Civitavecchia, Cagliari, Palermo, Fiume, Pola, Venice, Ancona, Brindisi, Taranto, Zara, and Gallipoli, as well as in Italian East Africa (with autonomous detachments in Massawa, Assab, and Mogadishu). After Italy's conquest of Albania in 1939, Port Militia detachments were also established in Vlorë and Durrës. The central headquarters of the Port Militia were located in Rome, with schools in Genoa and Sabaudia. Units of the Port Militia depended from the Ministry of Communications or local military and police commands for operational use.

Members of the Port Militia were considered officers of judicial police.
