= 7th SS Police Regiment =

- Country: Nazi Germany
- Branch: Schutzstaffel
- Type: Security
- Size: Regiment
- Garrison/HQ: Wehrkreis VI

The 7th SS Police Regiment (German: SS-Polizei-Regiment 7) was named the 7th Police Regiment (Polizei-Regiment 7) when it was formed from existing Order Police (Ordnungspolizei) units for security duties in Occupied Norway. It was redesignated as an SS unit in early 1943. It remained in Norway for most of the rest of World War II.

== Formation and organization ==
The regiment was formed in July 1942 in Wehrkreis VI in Western Germany. Police Battalion 309 (Polizei-Bataillon 309), Police Battalion 317 and Police Battalion 123 were redesignated as the regiment's first, second and third battalions, respectively. The regiment was transferred to Norway shortly after formation. In July 1943, the regimental headquarters and I Battalion were stationed in Trondheim, II Battalion was in Spillum, and III Battalion was in Narvik. All of the police regiments were redesignated as SS police units on 24 February 1943.
