= 22nd SS Police Regiment =

Nazi Germany police regiment

- Country: Nazi Germany
- Branch: Schutzstaffel
- Type: Security
- Size: Regiment
- Garrison/HQ: Wehrkreis XX

The 22nd SS Police Regiment (German: SS-Polizei-Regiment 22) was initially named the 4th Police Regiment (Polizei-Regiment 4) when it was formed in 1939 from existing Order Police (Ordnungspolizei) units for rear-area security duties during the invasion of Poland. It then became Police Regiment Warsaw (Polizei-Regiment Warschau). It was redesignated as the 22nd Police Regiment in mid-1942 before it received the SS title in early 1943.

== Formation and organization ==
The 4th Police Regiment was redesignated as Police Regiment Warsaw on 4 November 1939. Under its control were the four battalions of Police Group 6 (Polizeigruppe 6) as well as Police Battalions (Polizei-Bataillon) 6, 10. The latter battalion had been transferred to Police Regiment Lublin before the other five battalions were formally assigned to the regiment in mid-December. By early 1940 the regiment had only four battalions under command and it remained that size until around September 1940 when another battalion was transferred elsewhere, although the individual battalions assigned periodically changed.

The invasion of Russia in June 1941 created a need for rear-area security units on the Eastern Front and Police Regiment Warsaw provided some of these. They were partially replaced by worn-out units returning from Russia. When the regiment was redesignated on 9 July 1942 as the 22nd Police Regiment, its I Battalion came from Police Battalion 41, II Battalion was formed from independent police companies scattered throughout occupied Poland, and III Battalion was formed by redesignating Police Battalion 53, although it was still Russia and remained there until September. All of the police regiments were redesignated as SS police units on 24 February 1943.

The 22nd SS Police Regiment helped to crush the Warsaw Ghetto Uprising in April–May. Together with the 25th SS Police Regiment and other security forces, the regiment participated in Operation Harvest Festival (Aktion Erntefest) on 3–4 November, the massacre of 42,000 Jews imprisoned in the Majdanek extermination camp and several of its sub-camps. In July 1944, the regiment was transferred to Belarus and was destroyed there.
