= 18th SS Mountain Police Regiment =

SS-Mountain Police Regiment 18
- Country: Nazi Germany
- Branch: Ordnungspolizei
- Type: Security
- Size: Regiment
- Garrison/HQ: Wehrkreis XVIII

Commanders
- Notable commanders: Hermann Franz, Hans Hösel, Johann Poys

The SS Mountain Police Regiment 18 (German: SS-Polizei-Gebirgsjäger-Regiment 18) was initially named Mountain Police Regiment (Polizei-Gebirgsjäger-Regiment) when it was formed in 1942 from existing Order Police (Ordnungspolizei) units in order to secure the railwayline in the northern Caucasus (oil transports from Baku) - the withdrawal from this area made these plans obsolete. When all police battalions were merged into regiments in July 1942 the Mountain Police Regiment received Nr. 18 out of a total of 28 regiments. It remained the only mountain police regiment of the Ordnungspolizei.

== Formation and organization ==
The regiment was ordered formed in June 1942 in Garmisch-Partenkirchen, Germany. Police Battalion 302 (Polizei-Bataillon 302), Police Battalion 312 and Police Battalion 325 were redesignated as the regiment's first through third battalions, respectively. Colonel of the police Hermann Franz became regimental commander and remained in command until August 1943 when he was relieved by Lieutenant Colonel (Oberstleutenant der Polizei) Hösl. The regiment was transferred to Slovenia shortly after formation (August/September 1942) and then had to complete further training sessions in the Alps and in Danzig before it was sent to Finland in January 1943.

All of the police regiments were officially redesignated as SS police units on 12 March 1943, but this was only a nominal (honorary) renaming, all regiments remained part of the Order Police, they did not become part of the Waffen-SS or SS-administration.

From 1943 - 1945 the Polizei-Gebirgsjäger Regiment 18 was subordinated to the Wehrmacht, first in Finland, in summer 1943 it was moved to Greece, in September 1944 it retreated north through the Balkans. While it was stationed in Greece, an artillery battalion was assigned to the regiment.
