= Schutzmannschaft Battalion 33 =

Estonian military unit subordinated to Nazi Germany's Ordnungspolizei

Schutzmannschaft Battalion 33 Estnische Polizei Wacht Bataillon 33
- Active: December 1941 – June 1944
- Disbanded: June 1944
- Country: Nazi Germany
- Branch: Schutzmannschaft
- Type: Auxiliary police
- Role: Rear security
- Size: Battalion

Commanders
- Notable commanders: Voldemar Pärlin

Schutzmannschaft Battalion 33 was a unit of the Estonian Auxiliary Police subordinated to the German Ordnungspolizei (Order Police) during World War II.

It was formed in Tartu and Viljandi during the winter 1941–1942. The battalion had a brass band, but it was sent to Battalion 36 in 1942. In January 1942, the battalion was transported to the Leningrad front without training. In spring 1942, the battalion was reinforced with 200 men.

In December 1942, the battalion returned to Estonia and it was given holidays in Pärnu. Afterward, the battalion was taken to Tartu, where it was disbanded. Volunteers went to the Estonian Legion, other men were sent to Police Battalions 32, 35 or 287. At the same time a new battalion was formed with the same number. It consisted men from Selbstschutz companies of Valga, Antsla, Võru and Petseri. Battalion was divided into three companies:

- Company 1 in Valga.
- Company 2 in Võru.
- Company 3 in Petseri.

Battalion's size was now 381 men. It was used as a guard under the German 11th Infantry Division. Despite that battalion's role was only guard, it was installed in January 1944 to the positions near Mehikoorma ashore of Lake Peipus. In June 1944, the battalion was taken to rear and disbanded, the men were sent to battalions 37, 38 and 40.
