= 25th SS Police Regiment =

- Country: Nazi Germany
- Branch: Schutzstaffel
- Type: Security
- Size: Regiment
- Garrison/HQ: Wehrkreis III

Commanders
- Notable commanders: Gerret Korsemann; Jakob Sporrenberg

The 25th SS Police Regiment (German: SS-Polizei-Regiment 25) was initially named Police Regiment Lublin (Polizei-Regiment Lublin) when it was formed in late 1939 after the German invasion of Poland from existing Order Police (Ordnungspolizei) units for security duties there. It was redesignated as the 25th Police Regiment in mid-1942 before it received the SS title in early 1943.

== Formation and organization ==
Police Regiment Lublin was formed on 4 November 1939. Under its control were two battalions from Police Group 1 (Polizeigruppe 1) as well as Police Battalion 102 (Polizei-Bataillon 102). One of its early commanders was Gerret Korsemann, the chief of the Order Police in Lublin District from March 1940 through January 1941. The regiment maintained a strength of three battalions until July 1941, although the individual battalions were frequently rotated in and out.

The invasion of Russia in June 1941 created a need for rear-area security units on the Eastern Front and Police Regiment Lublin provided some of these. They were partially replaced by worn-out units returning from Russia. When the regiment was redesignated on 9 July 1942 as the 25th Police Regiment, Police Battalion 65, Police Battalion 67, and Reserve Police Battalion 101 were redesignated as the regiment's first through third battalions, respectively. All of the police regiments were redesignated as SS police units on 24 February 1943.

Together with the 22nd SS Police Regiment and other security forces, the regiment participated in Operation Harvest Festival (Aktion Erntefest) on 3–4 November, the massacre of 42,000 Jews imprisoned in the Majdanek extermination camp and several of its sub-camps. During this time it was commanded by SS-Gruppenführer und Generalleutnant der Polizei Jakob Sporrenberg, SS and Police Leader (SS- und Polizeiführer) Lublin.
