= 16th SS Police Regiment =

- Country: Nazi Germany
- Branch: Schutzstaffel
- Type: Security
- Size: Regiment
- Garrison/HQ: Wehrkreis V

The 16th SS Police Regiment (German: SS-Polizei-Regiment 16) was initially named the 16th Police Regiment (Polizei-Regiment 16) when it was formed in 1942 from existing Order Police (Ordnungspolizei) units for security duties on the Eastern Front. It was redesignated as an SS unit in early 1943.

== Formation and organization ==
The regiment was ordered formed on 9 July 1942 in northern Russia. Police Battalion 56 (Polizei-Bataillon 56), Police Battalion 102, I Battalion of the 15th Police Regiment, formerly Police Battalion 305, and Police Battalion 121 were redesignated as the regiment's first through fourth battalions, respectively.

I Battalion was transferred to Tilsit, East Prussia (now Sovetsk, Kaliningrad Oblast), and was converted into a training unit on 5 February 1943. It eventually became I Battalion of the 3rd SS Police Regiment and was replaced by a newly formed battalion in July 1944.

All of the police regiments were redesignated as SS police units on 24 February 1943, but this was strictly honorary. IV Battalion was disbanded in 1943 and the remnants of the 9th SS Police Regiment were absorbed into III Battalion in mid-1944.

=== Pirčiupiai Massacre ===
Under the command of Walter Titel, the III Battalion's 9th and 10th Companies committed the Pirčiupiai massacre on June 3, 1944.
