= 9th SS Police Regiment =

- Country: Nazi Germany
- Branch: Schutzstaffel
- Type: Security
- Size: Regiment
- Garrison/HQ: Wehrkreis V

The 9th SS Police Regiment (German: SS-Polizei-Regiment 9) was initially named the 9th Police Regiment (Polizei-Regiment 9) when it was formed in 1942 from existing Order Police (Ordnungspolizei) units for security duties on the Eastern Front. It was redesignated as an SS unit in early 1943.

== Formation and organization ==
The regiment was ordered formed in July 1942 in Russia, but the regimental headquarters was not formed until 2 September. Police Battalion 61 (Polizei-Bataillon 61), Police Battalion 112 and Police Battalion 132 were redesignated as the regiment's first through third battalions, respectively. All of the police regiments were redesignated as SS police units on 24 February 1943.

The regiment was destroyed in July 1944 and its remnants were incorporated into III Battalion of the 16th SS Police Regiment. It was ordered reformed on 29 January 1945 by the redesignation of SS Police Regiment Alpine Foothills (SS-Polizei-Regiment Alpenvorland).
