= Bastariya Battalion =

Paramilitary unit

241 Bastariya Battalion
- Active: 2018–present
- Country: India
- Allegiance: Central Reserve Police Force
- Size: Battalion
- Nickname: Bastariya Battalion

The Bastariya Battalion, also known as "Battalion 241," is a unit of India's Central Reserve Police Force (CRPF), based in Chhattisgarh. The unit is tasked with curbing Naxalist activities in Chhattisgarh state. The battalion is named "Bastariya" because the force is composed of locals — both male and female — from Dantewada, Bijapur, Sukma, and Narayanpur — some of the most Maoist-affected districts in Bastar Division, Chhattisgarh.

The battalion's sanctioned size is set at 743 personnel; the unit is currently composed of 534 personnel, 189 of whom are female, in accordance with the Indian Government's policy of 33% reservation for women.

== History ==
The Bastariya Battalion was formed on 1 April 2017 in order to "enhance local representation in CRPF's combat lay-out in the Bastar area", as well as to provide the Bastariya youth with secure employment. Accordingly, its recruitment process was unusual. Physical standards of height and weight were relaxed to give a fair chance to the local applicants, and the CRPF provided pre-educational and physical training to the local youths through Civic Action Programmes to maximize applicants' eligibility for induction into the special formation.

Union Home Minister Rajnath Singh commissioned the Bastariya Battalion on 21 May 2018. He attended the passing out parade of 241 Bastariya Battalion of the CRPF in Ambikapur, Chhattisgarh, on 21 May 2018.
