= 26th SS Police Regiment =

- Country: Nazi Germany
- Branch: Schutzstaffel
- Type: Security
- Size: Regiment
- Garrison/HQ: Wehrkreis IV

The 26th SS Police Regiment (German: SS-Polizei-Regiment 23) was initially named Police Regiment North Norway (Polizei-Regiment Nord-Norwegen) when it was formed in early 1941 after the German invasion of Norway in 1940 from existing Order Police (Ordnungspolizei) units for security duties there. It was redesignated as the 26th Police Regiment in mid-1942 before it received the SS title in early 1943.

== Formation and organization ==
Police Regiment North Norway was formed on 16 February 1941 with Police Battalions (Polizei-Bataillon) 256, 302 and 312 under its control. The regiment maintained a strength of three battalions through July 1942, although the individual battalions were frequently rotated in and out. The regiment was renamed the 26th Police Regiment in July 1942 and Police Battalions 251, 255, and 256 were redesignated as the regiment's first through third battalions, respectively. All of the police regiments were redesignated as SS police units on 24 February 1943. The regiment was transferred to German in May and arrived in Belarus the following month. It was destroyed in July 1944 and formally disbanded in November.
