= 20th SS Police Regiment =

- Country: Nazi Germany
- Branch: Schutzstaffel
- Type: Security
- Size: Regiment
- Garrison/HQ: Wehrkreis Böhmen-Mähren

The 20th SS Police Regiment (German: SS-Polizei-Regiment 20) was initially named Police Regiment Bohemia (Polizei-Regiment Böhmen) when it was formed in 1939 after the German occupation of Czechoslovakia from existing Order Police (Ordnungspolizei) units for security duties in Bohemia. It was redesignated as the 20th Police Regiment in mid-1942 before it received the SS title in early 1943.

== Formation and organization ==
Police Regiment Bohemia was created shortly after the occupation of Czechoslovakia in March 1939. Assigned were six battalions numbered I through VI, although they were renumbered in the 200 series in October. Some of these were transferred elsewhere and only partially replaced so that the regiment had five battalions in early 1941, Police Battalions (Polizei-Bataillon) 32, 316, 317, 319, and 320. All of these units were transferred to Russia after Operation Barbarossa in June and gradually replaced by three newly formed battalions, Reserve Police Battalion Prague, Reserve Police Battalion Kolin, and Reserve Police Battalion Klattau. When the regiment was renamed in July 1942, the battalions were redesignated as the regiment's first through third battalions, respectively, although their headquarters companies were not formed until 23 January 1943. All of the police regiments were redesignated as SS police units on 24 February. In April, I Battalion became part of Police Rifle Regiment 33 (Polizei-Schützen-Regiment) and was later replaced by Police Training Battalion Klagenfurt and Graz. In October it became independent and was sent to Italy. II Battalion was transferred to Hungary in March 1944 and was redesignated as II Battalion of the 1st SS Police Regiment in August.

== War crimes ==
The regiment has been implicated in two incidents of war crimes in Italy in June 1944 with 4 civilians killed. An other one took place at a small village called San Michele Arcangelo at the 7th of April 1944, carfiday. Victims were 18 civilians only very young children, one only 2 years old, women and elderlys.
