= 17th SS Police Regiment =

- Country: Nazi Germany
- Branch: Schutzstaffel
- Type: Security
- Size: Regiment
- Garrison/HQ: Wehrkreis IX

The 17th SS Police Regiment (German: SS-Polizei-Regiment 17) was initially named the 17th Police Regiment (Polizei-Regiment 17) when it was formed in 1942 from existing Order Police units (Ordnungspolizei) for security duties on the Eastern Front. It was redesignated as an SS unit in early 1943.

== Formation and organization ==
The regiment was ordered formed in July 1942 in Russia. Police Battalion 42 (Polizei-Bataillon 42) and Police Battalion 74 were redesignated as the regiment's first and second battalions, respectively. Police Battalion 69 was intended to become its third Battalion, but it became II Battalion of the 28th Police Regiment Todt instead. I Battalion of that regiment replaced it as III Battalion. All of the police regiments were redesignated as SS police units on 24 February 1943. On 22 February 1944 10 members of the 1st Battalion/17th SS Police Regiment for the part in the suppression of the Warsaw Ghetto Uprising of 1943.
