= 5th SS Police Regiment =

- Country: Nazi Germany
- Branch: Schutzstaffel
- Type: Security
- Size: Regiment
- Garrison/HQ: Wehrkreis XVII

The 5th SS Police Regiment (German: SS-Polizei-Regiment 5) was initially named the 5th Police Regiment (Polizei-Regiment 5) when it was formed in 1942 from existing Order Police (Ordnungspolizei) units for security duties in Occupied Serbia. It was redesignated as an SS unit in early 1943. The regiment was disbanded at the end of 1944.

== Formation and organization ==
The regiment was ordered formed in July 1942 in Serbia, but the regimental headquarters was not formed until 29 November. Police Battalion 64 (Polizei-Bataillon 64) in Belgrade, Serbia, and Police Battalion 322 in Slovenia were redesignated as the regiment's first and second battalions, respectively, and the third battalion was raised in Berlin, Germany. This battalion was disbanded before it ever left Berlin and it was replaced by the redesignation of the First Battalion of the 3rd Police Regiment (I./Polizei-Regiment 3) in January 1943. Brigadier General (Generalmajor der Schutzpolizei) Andreas May was the first regimental commander and remained in command until his death in June 1944. Lieutenant Colonel (Oberstleutenant der Schutzpolizei) Franz Lechthaler assumed command on 15 July and retained until sometime in late 1944.

All of these police regiments were redesignated as SS police units on 24 February 1943. The regiment was disbanded at the end of 1944 during the German withdrawal from Serbia.
