= Police Battalion 306 =

- Polizeibattalion 306
- Active: 1941–
- Country: Nazi Germany
- Role: Nazi security warfare Participation in the Holocaust
- Size: Battalion
- Part of: Order Police under SS command

The Police Battalion 306 (Polizeibattalion 306) was a formation of the Order Police (uniformed police) during the Nazi era. During the Soviet-German war of 1941–45, it was deployed in German-occupied areas of the Soviet Union, as part of Nazi Germany's security forces tasked with "bandit-fighting". Alongside other SS and police units, it participated in the Holocaust and was responsible for large-scale crimes against humanity targeting civilian populations.

== Background and formation ==
The German Order Police was a key instrument of the security apparatus of Nazi Germany. In the prewar period, Heinrich Himmler, the head of the SS, and Kurt Daluege, chief of the Order Police, cooperated in transforming the police force of the Weimar Republic into militarised formations ready to serve the regime's aims of conquest and racial annihilation. The police units participated in the annexation of Austria and the occupation of Czechoslovakia. Police troops were first formed into battalion-sized formations for the invasion of Poland, where they were deployed for security and policing purposes, also taking part in executions and mass deportations.

Twenty-three Order Police battalions were slated to take part in the 1941 invasion of the Soviet Union, Operation Barbarossa. Two battalions were assigned to support the Einsatzgruppen, the mobile death squads of the SS, and the Organisation Todt, the military construction group. The goals of the police battalions were to secure the rear by eliminating the remnants of the enemy forces, guarding the prisoners of war, and protecting the lines of communications and captured industrial facilities. Their instructions also included, as Daluege stated, the "combat of criminal elements, above all political elements". Comprising about 550 men, the battalion was raised from recruits mobilised from the 1905–1915 year groups. They were led by career police professionals, steeped in the ideology of Nazism, driven by anti-semitism and anti-Bolshevism.

== Operational history ==
During 1941, Police Battalion 306 was stationed in Lublin, occupied Poland, where its duties included shooting Soviet POWs who were identified as Red Army political officers (Commissars) and Jews. The battalion shot thousands of prisoners. For example, between September 21 and 28, the unit killed over 6,000 people in Stalag 359B. In October 1941, a junior officer, Lieutenant Klaus Hornig refused to carry out an order to shoot over 700 prisoners on legal and ethical grounds. He was discharged and eventually sentenced under the Nazi law of "undermining of military morale". The battalion departed Lublin on 18 February 1942.

In the summer of 1942, the battalion became part of the 15th Police Regiment formed in the occupied Soviet Union for Bandenbekämpfung ("bandit-fighting") duties. It participated in the 2–3 September 1942 massacre of Jews who lived in the ghetto in Kożangródek (now Kažan-Haradok, Belarus). The perpetrators included personnel of the battalion's 2nd Company, alongside the 2nd Company of Police Battalion 69. More than 900 Jews, including women and children, were murdered. There was only one survivor. Also on 2 September, personnel of the same units provided support to the SS and police forces liquidating the Łachwa Ghetto.

Between 29 October and 1 November 1942, the battalion participated in the liquidation of the Pinsk Ghetto (now in Pinsk, Belarus). About 20,000 inhabitants were murdered, shot either in the ghetto or over prepared pits.

== Aftermath ==
The Order Police as a whole had not been declared a criminal organisation by the Allies, unlike the SS, and its members were able to reintegrate into society largely unmolested, with many returning to police careers in Austria and West Germany. Six members of Police Battalion 306 were tried in the 1960s in West Germany for the murders committed in Pinsk and Stolin. They were given short prison sentences.

== Bibliography ==
- Blood, Phillip W. (2006). Hitler's Bandit Hunters: The SS and the Nazi Occupation of Europe. Potomac Books. ISBN 978-1-59797-021-1.
- Lewy, Guenter (2017). Perpetrators: The World of the Holocaust Killers. New York: Oxford University Press. ISBN 978-0-19066-113-7.
- Megargee, Geoffrey P., ed. (2012). The United States Holocaust Memorial Museum Encyclopedia of Camps and Ghettos, 1933–1945. Vol. II: Ghettos in German-Occupied Eastern Europe. Bloomington: Indiana University Press. ISBN 978-0-253-00202-0.
- Porter, T.E. (2011). "Hitler's Rassenkampf in the East". Crimes of State Past and Present: Government-Sponsored Atrocities and International Legal Responses. Routledge. pp. 54–84. ISBN 9781317986829.
- Showalter, Dennis (2005). "Foreword". Hitler's Police Battalions: Enforcing Racial War in the East. Kansas City: University Press of Kansas. ISBN 978-0-7006-1724-1.
- Westermann, Edward B. (2005). Hitler's Police Battalions: Enforcing Racial War in the East. Kansas City: University Press of Kansas. ISBN 978-0-7006-1724-1.
