= 8th SS Police Regiment =

- Country: Nazi Germany
- Branch: Schutzstaffel
- Type: Security
- Size: Regiment
- Garrison/HQ: Wehrkreis XII

The 8th SS Police Regiment (German: SS-Polizei-Regiment 8) was initially named the 8th Police Regiment (Polizei-Regiment 8) when it was formed in 1942 from existing Order Police (Ordnungspolizei) units for security duties on the Eastern Front. It was redesignated as an SS unit in early 1943.

== Formation and organization ==
The regiment was ordered formed in July 1942 in Russia, but the regimental headquarters was not formed until 2 September. Police Battalion 91 (Polizei-Bataillon 91), Police Battalion 111 and Police Battalion 134 were redesignated as the regiment's first through third battalions, respectively. All of the police regiments were redesignated as SS police units on 24 February 1943.

The regimental headquarters was destroyed in January 1943 and its remnants were withdrawn to Gotenhafen-Adlershorst, (now [Gdynia-Orłowo], Poland), where they were used to help form the first battalion of the 36th Police Rifle Regiment (Polizei-Schützen Regiment 36) in mid-1943. Its battalions, however, were assigned to different German Army security divisions and did not suffer its fate.

The 8th SS Police Regiment was reformed in November 1944, presumably in the Protectorate of Bohemia and Moravia, with four newly raised battalions. The regiment fought in Hungary in 1944–45 and it may have been deployed near Stettin, Germany (now Szczecin, Poland), in March 1945. Its fourth battalion was disbanded in April.
