= 2nd SS Police Regiment =

- Country: Nazi Germany
- Branch: Order Police under the command of the SS
- Type: Security
- Size: Regiment
- Garrison/HQ: Wehrkreis I

The 2nd SS Police Regiment (German: SS-Polizei-Regiment 2) was initially named the 2nd Police Regiment (Polizei-Regiment 2) when it was formed in 1942 from existing Order Police (Ordnungspolizei) units for security duties in Occupied Europe. It was redesignated as an SS unit in early 1943.

== Formation and organization ==
The regiment was ordered formed in July 1942 in Tilsit, East Prussia (now Sovetsk, Kaliningrad Oblast), but the regimental headquarters and the signal company were not formed until 2 September. Police Battalion 11 (Polizei-Bataillon 11), Police Battalion 13 and Police Battalion 22, the regiment's first through third battalions, respectively, were withdrawn from Russia to Tilsit between July and September to be reorganized and rebuilt. The regiment was reinforced with three batteries of artillery on 29 January 1943 which were consolidated into Police Artillery Battalion I (Polizei-Geschütz Abetilung I) on 8 September. All of the police regiments were redesignated as SS police units on 24 February 1943.

== Activities ==
The regiment took part in numerous anti-partisan operations in Russia, including Operation Adler in July–August 1942, Operation Wisent in November, Operation Zauberflöte in April 1943 and Operation Hermann in August.
