= 23rd SS Police Regiment =

- Country: Nazi Germany
- Branch: Schutzstaffel
- Type: Security
- Size: Regiment
- Garrison/HQ: Wehrkreis VIII

The 23rd SS Police Regiment (German: SS-Polizei-Regiment 23) was initially named Police Regiment Kraków (Polizei-Regiment Krakau) when it was formed in late 1939 after the German invasion of Poland from existing Order Police (Ordnungspolizei) units for security duties there. It was redesignated as the 23rd Police Regiment in mid-1942 before it received the SS title in early 1943.

== Formation and organization ==
Police Regiment Kraków was formed on 4 November 1939. Under its control were three battalions from Police Group 1 (Polizeigruppe 1) as well as Police Battalions (Polizei-Bataillon) 5 and 106. By April 1940 the regiment had only two battalions under command as they rotated in and out, but its strength had increased to three battalions by June and then to four battalions by October.

The invasion of the Soviet Union, Operation Barbarossa, in June 1941 created a need for rear-area security units in Army Group Rear Areas and Police Regiment Kraków provided some of these. They were partially replaced by worn-out units returning from the occupied Soviet Union. When the regiment was redesignated on 9 July 1942 as the 23rd Police Regiment, its I Battalion came from Police Battalion 307, while II and III Battalions were formed from independent police companies scattered throughout occupied Poland, although their headquarters companies were not formed until 23 January 1943. In early 1943, I Battalion was redesignated as III Battalion of the 24th SS Police Regiment and was replaced by a newly formed unit. All of the police regiments were redesignated as SS police units on 24 February. The III Battalion helped suppress the Warsaw Ghetto Uprising of April–May 1943. II Battalion was disbanded in November 1944 and the rest of the regiment followed in March 1945.
