= 3rd SS Police Regiment =

- Country: Nazi Germany
- Branch: Schutzstaffel
- Type: Security
- Size: Regiment
- Garrison/HQ: Wehrkreis VI

The 3rd SS Police Regiment (German: SS-Polizei-Regiment 3) was named the 3rd Police Regiment (Polizei-Regiment 3) when it was temporarily formed in 1939 from existing Order Police (Ordnungspolizei) units for security duties during the invasion of Poland. The second formation was ordered in 1942 from existing Order Police units in the Netherlands. It was redesignated as an SS unit in early 1943. It remained in the Netherlands for the rest of World War II.

== Formation and organization ==
The first incarnation of the 3rd Police Regiment was formed on 8 September 1939 in Katowice, Poland, from elements of Police Group 1 (Polizeigruppe 1) for security duties in the rear area of the 14th Army during the Polish Campaign. The regiment was presumably disbanded after the end of the campaign.

The regiment was ordered to be reformed in July 1942 in the Netherlands, but the regimental headquarters and the signal company were not formed until 2 September in The Hague. Police Battalion 66 (Polizei-Bataillon 66) in Tilburg and Police Battalion 68 in Amsterdam were redesignated as the regiment's first and second battalions, respectively. The third battalion of 12th SS Police Regiment in Westerbork was later redesignated as the third battalion of the regiment. In turn, the first battalion was redesignated as III./Police Regiment 5 at the beginning of 1943 and was replaced by the redesignation of the first battalion of Police Regiment 16 in February, then rebuilding in Tilsit, East Prussia (now Sovetsk, Kaliningrad Oblast). It was later based in Tilburg. All of the police regiments were redesignated as SS police units on 24 February 1943.
