= Harald Riipalu =

Estonian military personnel, SS officer

- Riipalu in 1944
- Born: 13 February 1912; Saint Petersburg, Russian Empire
- Died: 4 April 1961 (aged 49); West Yorkshire, England, United Kingdom
- Military career
- Allegiance: Estonia; Soviet Union; Nazi Germany
- Branch: Estonian Army; Red Army; Wehrmacht; Waffen-SS
- Service years: 1935–45
- Rank: Obersturmbannführer
- Unit: 20th Waffen Grenadier Division of the SS (1st Estonian)
- Commands: 36th Estonian Police Battalion
- Conflicts: World War II Eastern Front: Battle of Stalingrad; Battle of Meerapalu; Battle of Narva; Battle of Auvere; Battle of Tannenberg Line; Battle of Oppeln
- Awards: Knight's Cross of the Iron Cross

Harald Riipalu (born as Harald Reibach) (13 February 1912 – 4 April 1961) was an Estonian commander in the German Wehrmacht and the Waffen-SS during World War II. He was a recipient of the Knight's Cross of the Iron Cross of Nazi Germany.

== Career ==
After the Soviet occupation of Estonia in 1940, Riipalu was forcibly mobilized into the Soviet Army 22nd Territorial Corps, serving until 1941, at which time he defected to the German side.

From 1942 to 1943, Riipalu was a platoon leader and company commander of the 36th Estonian Police Battalion, and became commander of the battalion in November 1942.

From 1943 to 1945, he served in the 3rd SS-Brigade and the 20th Waffen Grenadier Division of the SS. He was the Commander of the 45th SS-Grenadier Regiment from April 1944. On 23 August 1944, he was decorated with the Knight's Cross of the Iron Cross for his actions in the Battle of Tannenberg Line and in the Battle of Auvere where Riipalu and his regiment drove back the assault of the Soviet Army, which prevented the encirclement of Army Detachment Narwa. The award was presented to him by Felix Steiner, the commander of III SS Panzer Corps.

After the end of the war, Riipalu evaded Soviet captivity by fleeing to Denmark. He died in Great Britain in 1961.

== Awards ==
- Knight's Cross of the Iron Cross on 23 August 1944 as Waffen-Obersturmbannführer and commander of Waffen-Grenadier-Regiment der SS 45 (estnische Nr. 1).
