= 21st SS Police Regiment =

- Country: Nazi Germany
- Branch: Schutzstaffel
- Type: Security
- Size: Regiment
- Garrison/HQ: Wehrkreis XIII, Böhmen-Mähren

The 21st SS Police Regiment (German: SS-Polizei-Regiment 21) was initially named Police Regiment Moravia (Polizei-Regiment Mähren) when it was formed in 1939 after the German occupation of Czechoslovakia from existing Order Police (Ordnungspolizei) units for security duties in Moravia. It was redesignated as the 21st Police Regiment in mid-1942 before it received the SS title in early 1943.

== Formation and organization ==
Police Regiment Moravia was created shortly after the occupation of Czechoslovakia in March 1939. Assigned were four battalions numbered I through IV, although they were renumbered in the 200 series in October. Some of these were transferred elsewhere and only partially replaced so that the regiment had three battalions in early 1941, Police Battalions (Polizei-Bataillon) 84, 315, and 318. All of these units were transferred to Russia after Operation Barbarossa in June and were gradually replaced by various newly formed companies under the command of Reserve Police Battalion Holleschau. When the regiment was renamed in July 1942, the newly arrived Police Battalion 32 became the regiment's first battalion, the existing separate companies became the second battalion and the third battalion was newly raised, although the headquarters companies for the last two battalions were not formed until 23 January 1943. All of the police regiments were redesignated as SS police units on 24 February. In April, I Battalion became part of Police Rifle Regiment 34 (Polizei-Schützen-Regiment) and was later replaced by a newly formed unit. II Battalion was transferred to Hungary in March 1944 and was redesignated as II Battalion of the 1st SS Police Regiment in August.
