= 14th SS Police Regiment =

- Country: Nazi Germany
- Branch: Schutzstaffel
- Type: Security
- Size: Regiment
- Garrison/HQ: Wehrkreis XII, later III

Commanders
- Notable commanders: Albert Buchmann

The 14th SS Police Regiment (German: SS-Polizei-Regiment 14) was initially named the 14th Police Regiment (Polizei-Regiment 14) when it was formed in 1942 from existing Order Police units (Ordnungspolizei) for security duties on the Eastern Front. The regiment was destroyed in January 1943 and the survivors were used to rebuild it in Southern France several months later. The second incarnation was formed from existing police units. It was given an honorary SS title. Shortly before the end of the war, the regiment was absorbed into the 3rd SS Police and Infantry Regiment (SS-Police und Infanterie Regiment 3) of the 35th SS and Police Grenadier Division.

== Formation and organization ==
The regiment was ordered formed in July 1942 in Central Russia from Police Battalion 51 (Polizei-Bataillon 51), Police Battalion 122 and Police Battalion 63 which were redesignated as the regiment's first through third battalions, respectively. Lieutenant Colonel (Oberstleutenant) Albert Buchmann was appointed as the regiment's first commander. The connection between Police Battalion 63 and the regiment was only nominal as the former unit was stationed in the Netherlands in July and was ultimately redesignated as III Battalion, 4th SS Police Regiment. The battalion was replaced by Police Battalion 313 when the latter unit returned to Russia around November. The regiment was destroyed near Kharkiv, Ukraine, in January 1943 and its remnants were withdrawn to Adlershorst, (now Rusko, Poland), where they were used to form the II Battalion of the reformed regiment. Buchmann was killed in action on 11 March.
