= 19th SS Police Regiment =

- Country: Nazi Germany
- Branch: Schutzstaffel
- Type: Security
- Size: Regiment
- Garrison/HQ: Wehrkreis XVII

The 19th SS Police Regiment (German: SS-Polizei-Regiment 19) was initially named the 19th Police Regiment (Polizei-Regiment 19) when it was formed in 1942 from existing Order Police (Ordnungspolizei) units for security duties in Occupied Europe. It was redesignated as an SS unit in early 1943.

== Formation and organization ==
The regiment was ordered formed in July 1942 in Slovenia. Police Battalion 72 (Polizei-Bataillon 72), Police Battalion 171, and Police Battalion 181 were redesignated as the regiment's first through third battalions, respectively. All of the police regiments were redesignated as SS police units on 24 February 1943. The regiment was in France by June 1944 and, more specifically, in the area of Langres by September.
