= 36th Estonian Police Battalion =

Nazi Germany auxiliary police unit

- Active: 23 November 1941 – 18 January 1943
- Allegiance: Nazi Germany
- Branch: Schutzmannschaft; Estonian Auxiliary Police
- Type: Auxiliary police
- Role: Rear security
- Size: Battalion (438 as of August 1942)
- Part of: SS of Nazi Germany
- Engagements: Nazi security warfare Battle of Stalingrad

Commanders
- Notable commanders: Harald Riipalu

36th Estonian Police Battalion (also known as Schutzmannschaft Front Bataillon 36 Arensburg (German) and 36. Kaitse Rindepataljon (Estonian)) was an Estonian rear-security unit during World War II that operated under command of the German SS.

== Operational history ==
The 36th Estonian Police Battalion was established on 23 November 1941 in western Estonia and on Estonian islands. Between May and August 1942, the battalion was in training and received reinforcements from other units, bringing its total strength to 23 officers, 161 non-commissioned officers, and 254 troops. It participated at Anti-partisan operations in Belarus and guarded the prisoner-of-war camps in the coal mines of Stalino and Makeyevka. From 22 November to 31 December 1942 the battalion took part of the Battle of Stalingrad. Having had 39 killed, 97 wounded, and 11 missing, the battalion was brought back to Estonia in January 1943 and disbanded, with many men joining the Estonian Legion.

The 36th battalion was formed again in May 1943, and in autumn was sent to the front at Nevel where it was merged into the 288th battalion.

== Massacre at Novogrudok ==
On 6 and 7 August 3000 to 5000 Jews were killed in the area of Novogrudok, Belarus. The 36th battalion was in the area from 4 August to 25 August 1942. The battalion's 16 August report said that the battalion was engaged in "fighting against partisans".

According to the Estonian International Commission for Investigation of Crimes Against Humanity, "the 36th Police Battalion participated on August 7, 1942 in the gathering together and shooting of almost all Jews still surviving in the town of Novogrudok". The Commission's report noted:

In the published records, this unit was described as fighting against partisans at the time. The Commission believes that although there clearly were numerous engagements between police units and partisans, "fighting against partisans" and "guarding prisoner of war camps" were at times ways of describing participation in actions against civilians, including Jews.

The Estonian Internal Security Service (KaPo) investigation into the battalion's activities concluded that there was no evidence about participation in war crimes or crimes against humanity.
