= Anton Adamovič =

- Антон Адамовіч
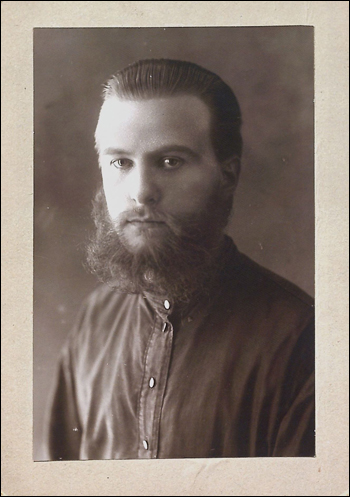
- Born: June 26, 1909; Minsk, Russian Empire
- Died: June 12, 1998 (aged 88); New York, U.S.
- Resting place: Belarusian Cemetery in East Brunswick, New Jersey, US
- Occupations: literary critic, novelist, publicist and historian
- Organization: Rada of the Belarusian Democratic Republic
- Notable work: Resistance to Sovietisation in Belarusian literature

Anton Adamovič (Belarusian: Анто́н Яўста́ф’евіч Адамо́віч; Russian: Анто́н Евста́фьевич Адамо́вич; 26 June 1909 – 12 June 1998) was a literary critic, novelist, publicist and historian.

Adamovič was born in Minsk into a middle-class family. He finished a local teachers college and in 1928 enrolled at the Literature and Linguistics department of the Belarusian State University.

In 1926, he started working as a literary critic – his reviews of works of many Belarusian writers, including Marakoŭ, Harecki, Kolas, Bahdanovič, Trus, Barščeŭski were published in the magazine Uzvyšša (High Ground), where he became the youngest contributor, and Čyrvony Sejbit (Red Sower).

In 1930, Adamovič was arrested by the Soviet security services on the trumped-up charges of belonging to the Union for the Liberation of Belarus and exiled for 8 years to the city of Glazov in the Russian republic of Udmurtia, and then transferred to Vyatka.

During World War II under German occupation, he worked in several Belarusian newspapers publishing many articles on Belarusian national revival, journalistic and literary studies, including his best known articles Uzvyšša as Belarusian National Ideology in which he discussed issues of Belarusian national ideology and education and Our National Emblems, which told the story of the Pahonia and white-red-white flag. He headed a publishing department created under the Minsk City Administration and was the editor-in-chief of the publishing house of the Belarusian Academic Society.

After the war, Adamovič lived in camps for displaced persons in West Germany where he was engaged in educational projects for Belarusian exiles, literature and journalism editing and contributing to several emigree newspapers and magazines. He became actively involved with the Munich Institute for the Study of the USSR and Radio Liberty.

In 1950, he moved to New York, worked as a professor of history at Columbia University and became one of the most active figures of the Belarusian diaspora, ideological leader of the Belarusian Democratic Republic in exile and vice-president of its Council (Rada). In 1951, he took part in the foundation of the Belarusian Institute of Science and Art (BINIM) and assisted the development of the Belarusian literary movement in exile by contributing to the publication of works of a number of Belarusian emigrant writers.

In his publications, Adamovič advocated Belarusian national revival and rejection of Soviet ideology and exposed the destruction of the Belarusian creative elite during Stalin's purges and the widespread Russification carried out by communist authorities in Belarus. He criticised the dogmas of socialist realism, which limited creative freedoms, and tried to develop a new concept of the history of Belarusian literature.

The most famous work of Adamovič, Resistance to Sovietisation in Belarusian literature, was published in Munich in 1956.

Adamovič died in 1998 in New York and is buried in the Belarusian cemetery in New Brunswick, New Jersey.

His works were published in Belarus after his death.
