= Gerret Korsemann =

SS and Police Leader and SS-Gruppenführer

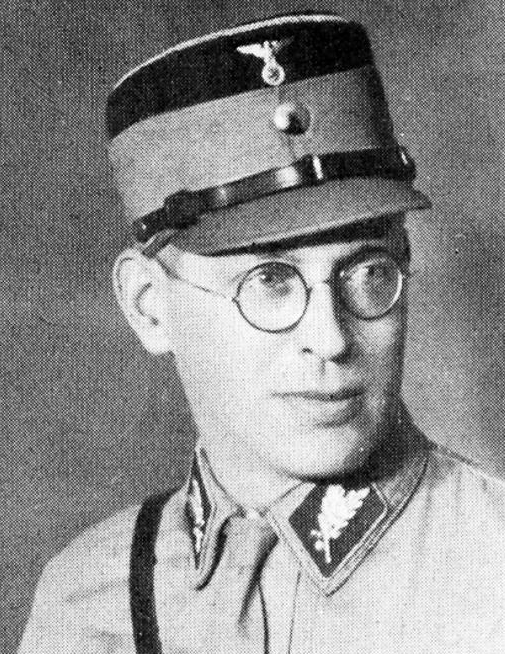
- Korsemann c. 1932
- Born: 8 June 1895; Nebel, Province of Schleswig-Holstein, Kingdom of Prussia, German Empire
- Died: 16 July 1958 (age 63); Munich, West Germany
- Military career
- Allegiance: German Empire; Nazi Germany
- Branch: Imperial German Army; Schutzstaffel; Waffen-SS
- Service years: 1914–1919; 1939–1945
- Rank: SS-Gruppenführer and Generalleutnant of police
- Commands: SS and Police Leader, "Rowno;" "Rostov-Awdejewka"; Deputy Higher SS and Police Leader, "Russland-Mitte"
- Conflicts: World War I World War II
- Awards: Iron Cross, 1st and 2nd class War Merit Cross, 2nd class with Swords

Gerret Korsemann (8 June 1895 – 16 July 1958) was a German SS and police official during the Nazi era and a Holocaust perpetrator. During the Second World War he was a high-ranking police official in the General Government and an SS and Police Leader in the occupied Soviet Union. After the war, he was convicted of war crimes and imprisoned in Poland.

== Early life ==
Korsemann was born in Nebel and took part in the First World War as a soldier in the Imperial German Army, receiving the Iron Cross 1st and 2nd class and the Wound Badge in black. After the end of the war, he served in the Freikorps "Grodno" in the Baltic States from 1919 to 1920, and remained there during the early 1920s.

After returning to Germany, Korsemann joined the Nazi Party (membership number 47,735) and its paramilitary unit, the Sturmabteilung (SA), in November 1926. As an early Party member, he was a holder of the Golden Party Badge. At the April 1932 Prussian state election, he was elected to the Landtag of Prussia and served until its dissolution in October 1933. While an SA-Standartenführer, he led SA-Standarte VI. After promotion to SA-Oberführer and SA-Brigadeführer, he was the SA leader in southern Hanover Province from 1931 to 1932. He was then promoted to SA-Gruppenführer in October 1932 and led the SA Gruppe Niedersachsen (Lower Saxony) until early 1937. At that point, he left the SA and joined the Ordnungspolizei (Orpo), Germany's uniformed police force. He worked as an administrator in the Orpo Main Office in Berlin until April 1939, working his way up to Oberstleutnant of Police.

On 20 April 1939 he was accepted into the SS (SS number 314,170) with the rank of SS-Oberführer, and next commanded the police school in Fürstenfeldbruck from April to October 1939.

== Second World War ==
Shortly after the outbreak of the Second World War, Korsemann was sent as a police administrator to the General Government in October 1939. He became the commander of all Ordnungspolizei forces in the Lublin District from March 1940 through January 1941; during this period he commanded Police Regiment Lublin. From February to April 1941, he commanded the 14th SS-Standarte "Totenkopfstandarte," and then served at the Reich Security Main Office in Berlin. In August 1941 he was promoted to SS-Brigadeführer and Generalmajor of Police, and was deployed to the Soviet Union as SS and Police Leader (SSPF) "Rowno" (Rivne) from 1 August 1941 to 1 January 1942. During his tenure there, an estimated 17,000 to 18,000 Jews were executed between 6–8 November 1941. In December 1941 he was also involved in the mass murder of around 15,000 Jews at Drobytsky Yar near Kharkiv.

In July 1942, Korsemann was promoted to SS-Gruppenführer and Generalleutnant of Police. He had been slated to lead a newly established command as the Higher SS and Police Leader (HSSPF) "Kaukasien" based at Grozny but, in the event, this higher command was never implemented. Instead, from 27 May to 1 October 1942, he became SSPF "Rostov-Awdejewka" (Rostov-on-Don-Avdiivka), reporting to the HSSPF "Russland-Süd" (Southern Russia), Hans-Adolf Prützmann. After the German defeat at Stalingrad and the German withdrawal from the Caucasus, he was transferred to be the Deputy HSSPF "Russland-Mitte" (Central Russia), headquartered in Mogilev, on 24 March 1943. In this capacity, he acted on behalf of HSSPF Erich von dem Bach-Zelewski who was on extended assignment as the leader of all anti-partisan activities.

At that time, allegations of cowardice were leveled against Korsemann within the SS, alleging that he had retreated too hastily during the withdrawal from the Caucasus. Korsemann wrote to the Wehrmacht commander who led the withdrawal, Generalfeldmarschall Ewald von Kleist, requesting a letter of exoneration. Reichsführer-SS Heinrich Himmler was incensed that such a senior SS officer had involved a Wehrmacht general in this internal SS disciplinary matter, and on 5 July 1943 he relieved Korsemann of his command, demoted him and punitively transferred him to the Waffen-SS. From January 1944 until the end of the war, Korsemann was deployed at the eastern front as an SS-Hauptsturmfuhrer, commanding a company of the 3rd SS Panzer Division Totenkopf.

After the war, Korsemann was extradited to Poland. He was convicted of crimes committed there, sentenced to 18 months imprisonment in 1947 and released in November 1949. He never stood trial for his Holocaust-related crimes in the Soviet Union, and lived in West Germany until his death in Munich in 1958.

== See also ==
- The Holocaust in Ukraine

== Sources ==
- Birn, Ruth Bettina (1986). Die Hoheren SS- und Polizeifiihrer: Himmlers Vertreter im Reich und in den besetzten Gebieten. Düsseldorf: Droste Verlag. ISBN 978-3-77000-710-3.
- Brandon, Ray; Lower, Wendy, eds. (2008). The Shoah in Ukraine: History, Testimony, Memorialization. Bloomington: Indiana University Press. ISBN 978-0-253-35084-8.
- Höhne, Heinz (1979). The Order of the Death's Head: The Story of Hitler's SS. Ballantine Books. ISBN 0-345-28333-3.
- Klee, Ernst (2007). Das Personenlexikon zum Dritten Reich. Wer war was vor und nach 1945. Frankfurt-am-Main: Fischer-Taschenbuch-Verlag. ISBN 978-3-596-16048-8.
- Schiffer Publishing Ltd., ed. (2000). SS Officers List: SS-Standartenführer to SS-Oberstgruppenführer (As of 30 January 1942). Schiffer Military History Publishing. ISBN 0-7643-1061-5.
- Yerger, Mark C. (1997). Allgemeine-SS: The Commands, Units and Leaders of the General SS. Schiffer Publishing Ltd. ISBN 0-7643-0145-4.
