= 27th SS Police Regiment =

- Country: Nazi Germany
- Branch: Schutzstaffel
- Type: Security
- Size: Regiment
- Garrison/HQ: Wehrkreis IV

The 27th SS Police Regiment (German: SS-Polizei-Regiment 27) was initially named Police Regiment South Norway (Polizei-Regiment Süd-Norwegen) when it was formed in early 1941 after the German invasion of Norway in 1940 from existing Order Police (Ordnungspolizei) units for security duties there. It was redesignated as the 27th Police Regiment in mid-1942 before it received the SS title in early 1943.

== Formation and organization ==
Police Regiment South Norway was formed on 16 February 1941 with Police Battalions (Polizei-Bataillon) 251, 252, 253 and 255 under its control. The regiment maintained a strength of four battalions through July 1942, although the individual battalions were frequently rotated in and out. The regiment was renamed the 27th Police Regiment in July 1942 and Police Battalions 319, 321, 9, and 44 were redesignated as the regiment's first through fourth battalions, respectively. All of the police regiments were redesignated as SS police units on 24 February 1943. In March, I Battalion was based in Bergen, II Battalion was in Halden, III Battalion occupied Kongsvinger and IV Battalion garrisoned Oslo.
