= 24th SS Police Regiment =

- Country: Nazi Germany
- Branch: Schutzstaffel
- Type: Security
- Size: Regiment
- Garrison/HQ: Wehrkreis VIII

The 24th SS Police Regiment (German: SS-Polizei-Regiment 24) was initially named Police Regiment Radom (Polizei-Regiment Radom) when it was formed in late 1939 after the German invasion of Poland from existing Order Police (Ordnungspolizei) units for security duties there. It was redesignated as the 24th Police Regiment in mid-1942 before it received the SS title in early 1943.

== Formation and organization ==
Police Regiment Radom was formed on 4 November 1939. Under its control were four police battalions (Polizei-Bataillon); one battalion from Police Group 1 (Polizeigruppe 1) and three from Police Group 2. Its battalions rotated in and out, but it maintained its strength at four battalions until another was assigned in October 1940.

The invasion of Russia in June 1941 created a need for rear-area security units on the Eastern Front and Police Regiment Radom provided some of these. When the 24th Police Regiment was formed on 9 July 1942, it not have been by redesignating Police Regiment Radom as the regimental headquarters was not formed until 21 April 1943, although it fits in the 22–25 sequence allotted to the four police regiments based in Poland. At any rate, I and II Battalions were formed by redesignating Police Battalions 83 and 133 in the District of Galicia. Police Battalion 93 in Slovenia was redesignated as III Battalion, but this was strictly nominal as it remained in Slovenia until it was transferred as Marseille, France, as a part of Police Regiment Griese in January 1943. It was replaced by redesignating I Battalion of the 23rd SS Police Regiment. All of the police regiments were retitled as SS police units on 24 February. The regiment was transferred to Belarus in May 1943 and was reformed in mid-November 1944 after having been destroyed during Operation Bagration.
