= 13th Belarusian Police (SD) Battalion =

Belarusian collaborationist formation

Patch

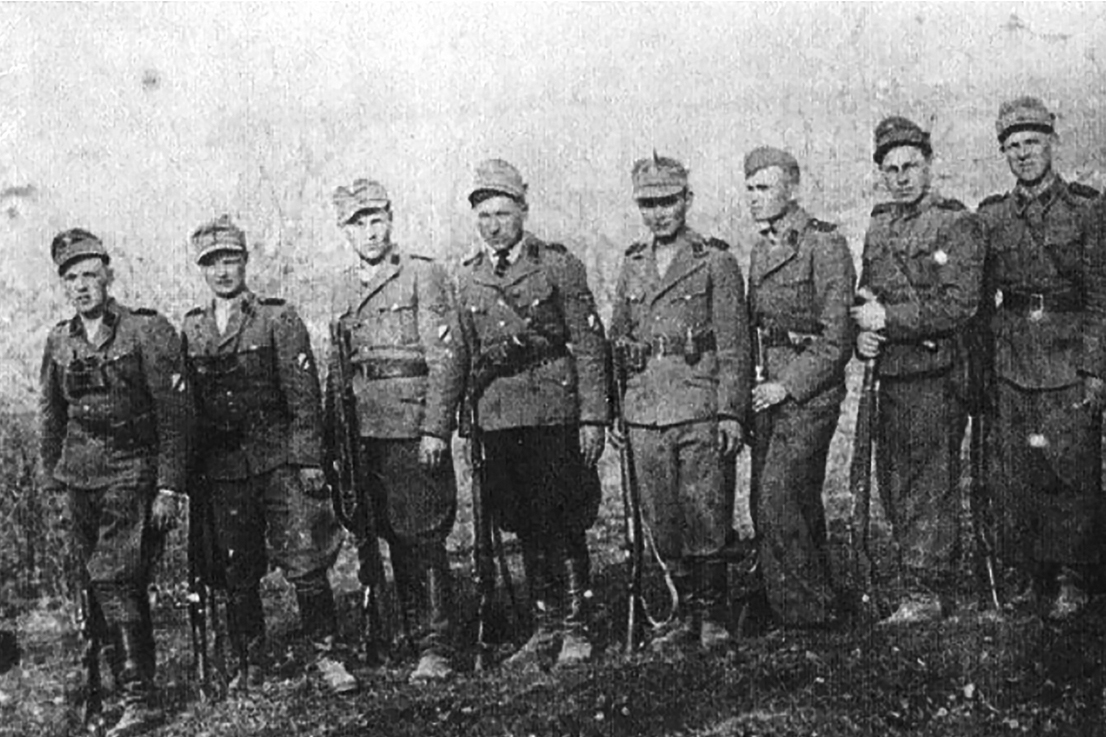
Members of the 13th Belarusian Police Battalion SD, c. 1943

13th Belarusian Police (SD) Battalion (German: Schutzmannschafts Bataillon der SD 13) was a Belarusian collaborationist formation in German service, established to combat partisan activity, primarily Soviet, and to guard concentration and POW camps. Unlike other units of the Belarusian Auxiliary Police, the 13th Battalion was directly subordinate to the Security Service (SD) of SS.

The formation of the unit began in January and February 1943 in Minsk, based on the already existing structures of the Belarusian SD. Primarily Belarusians joined the unit, and there were also Poles and Russians among them. Recruitment was essentially voluntary, although there were cases of forced mobilization. The officer and non-commissioned officer were both the Germans and the Belarusians. German Sturmbannführer Junskers was the commander of the battalion, but Belarusian officers were commanders of companies. Members of the Belarusian People's Self-Assistance, a nationalist organization created by the Germans, which activists intended to become the beginnings of Belarusian statehood, took part in the formation of the unit, trying to turn it into a Belarusian national unit.

13th Battalion took part in numerous anti-partisan campaigns and pacification on the territory of Belarus in the years 1943–1944. Members of the unit also took part in the liquidation of Jewish ghettos (Hlybokaye, Minsk, Vileyka, possibly Valozhyn), and guarded the Koldychevo and Maly Trostenets concentration camps. Later, the battalion's units took part in the suppression of the Warsaw Uprising in 1944. For a brief period in 1944, the 3rd Company of the 13th Battalion was stationed in German-occupied Adriatic Littoral and its staff was in Trieste.

== Bibliography ==
- Hryboŭski, Jury (2007). "Беларускі легіён СС: міфы і рэчаіснасць" [The Belarusian SS Legion: Myths and Reality]. Belarusian Historical Review (in Belarusian). 14 (1–2).
- Grzybowski, Jerzy (2010). "An Outline History of the 13th (Belarusian) Battalion of the SD Auxiliary Police (Schutzmannschafts Bataillon der SD 13)". The Journal of Slavic Military Studies. 23 (3): 461–476. doi:10.1080/13518046.2010.503147. S2CID 144787727.
- Grzybowski, Jerzy (2021). Białoruski ruch niepodległościowy w czasie II wojny światowej [Belarusian independence movement during World War II] (in Polish). Warsaw. ISBN 978-83-8229-251-0.
- Rein, Leonid (2017). "6. Eastern Europe: Belarusian auxiliaries, Ukrainian Waffen-SS soldiers and the special case of the Polish 'Blue Police'". In Böhler, Jochen; Gerwarth, Robert (eds.). The Waffen-SS: A European History. Oxford, Great Britain: Oxford University Press. ISBN 978-0-19-879055-6.
