= Rusko, Greater Poland Voivodeship =

Rusko
- Village
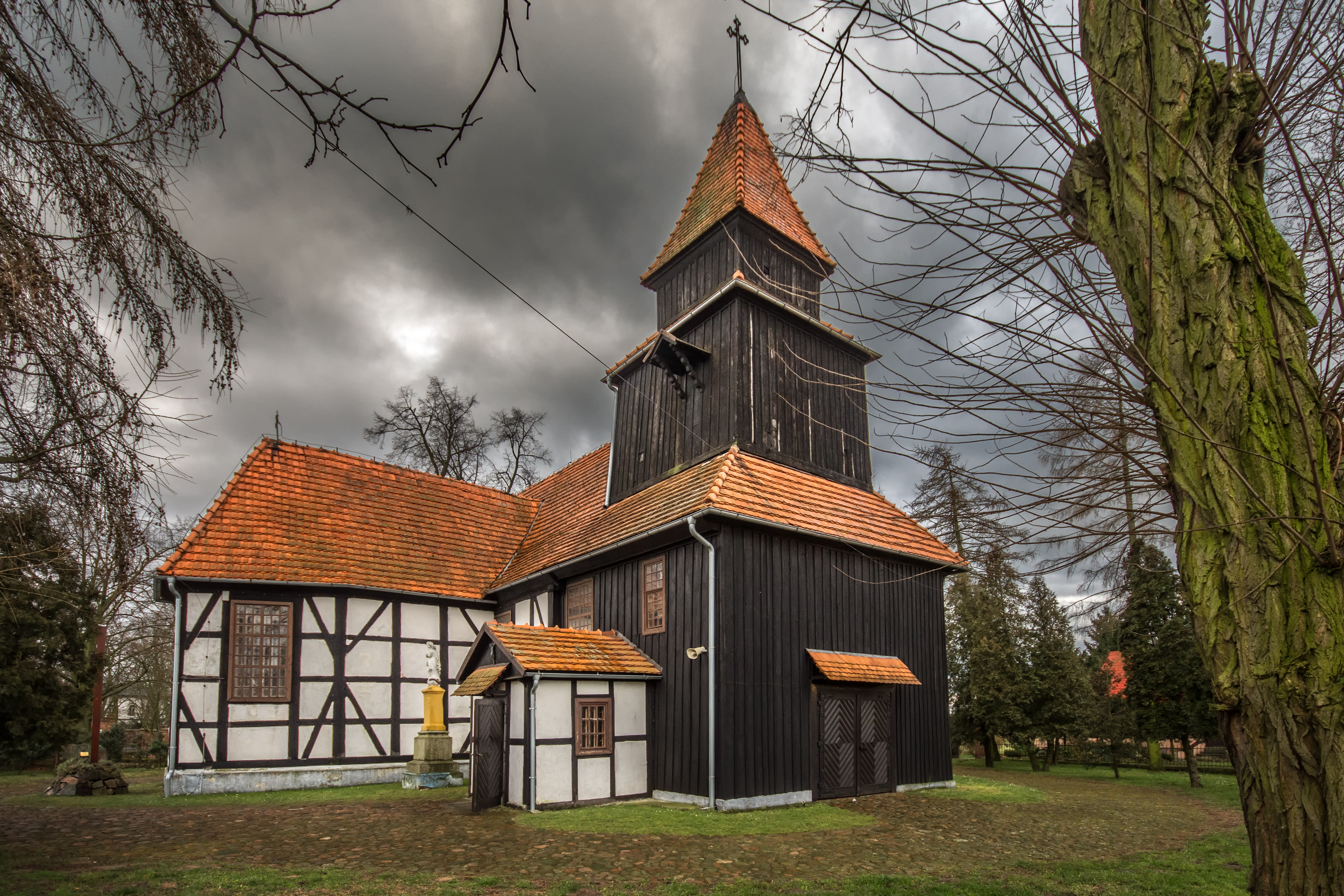
- Church of Saint Adalbert

- Location within Poland
- Coordinates: 51°55′N 17°22′E
- Country: Poland
- Voivodeship: Greater Poland
- County: Jarocin
- Gmina: Jaraczewo

Rusko [ˈruskɔ] is a village in the administrative district of Gmina Jaraczewo, within Jarocin County, Greater Poland Voivodeship, in west-central Poland.
