= 4th SS Police Regiment =

- Country: Nazi Germany
- Branch: Order Police; Schutzstaffel
- Role: Rear security Bandenbekämpfung
- Size: Regiment

The 4th SS Police Regiment (German: SS-Polizei-Regiment 4) was named the 4th Police Regiment (Polizei-Regiment 4) when it was temporarily formed in 1939 from existing Order Police (Ordnungspolizei) units for security duties during the invasion of Poland. The second formation was ordered in 1942 from existing Order Police battalions in Occupied France. It was redesignated as an SS unit in early 1943.

== Formation and organization ==
The 4th Police Regiment was formed on 16 September 1939 in Kielce, Poland, from elements of Police Group 6 (Polizeigruppe 6) for security duties in the rear area of the 3rd Army during the invasion of Poland. The regimental headquarters was redesignated as Police Regiment Warsaw (Polizei-Regiment Warschau) around November.

The regiment was ordered to be reformed in July 1942 in France, but the regimental headquarters was not formed until 16 April 1943; in the meantime its battalions were controlled by Police Regiment Griese (Polize-Regiment Griese). Police Battalion 316 in Upper Carniola, Slovenia, and Police Battalion 323 in Occupied Poland were redesignated as the regiment's first and second battalions, respectively, and the third battalion was newly formed. The first two battalions were transferred to France shortly afterwards. All of the police regiments were redesignated as SS police units on 24 February 1943.
