= SS Police Regiment Brixen =

Security formation of the German Order Police during World War II

The SS Police Regiment Brixen (SS-Polizei-Regiment Brixen) was a security formation of the German Order Police during World War II. The unit operated along the Alps, conducting Nazi security warfare in German-occupied northern Italy.

== Formation and service ==
The unit was raised on 12 October 1944 in Brixen, Italy, from local conscripts (ethnically Germans) with a cadre of Germans; its training was completed in December. The previous month it reported a strength of 1,335 men in three battalions. When the men learned that it might be transferred to the front lines in early 1945, many deserted. In February, the two remaining battalions were used to rebuild SS Volunteer Grenadier Regiment 80 of the 31st SS Volunteer Grenadier Division.

== Bibliography ==
- Battistelli, Pier Paolo & Crociani, Piero (2015). World War II Partisan Warfare in Italy. Oxford, UK: Osprey. ISBN 978-1-4728-0893-6.
- Nix, Phil & Jerome, Georges (2006). The Uniformed Police Forces of the Third Reich 1933-1945 (2nd ed.). Stockholm, Sweden: Leandoer & Ekholm. ISBN 91-975894-3-8.
- Tessin, Georg & Kannapin, Norbert (2000). Waffen-SS under Ordnungspolizei im Kriegseinsatz 1939–1945: Ein Überlick anhand der Feldpostübersicht, Osnabrück, Germany: Biblio Verlag. ISBN 3-7648-2471-9
