= Military district (Germany) =

Administrative territorial units within Nazi Germany

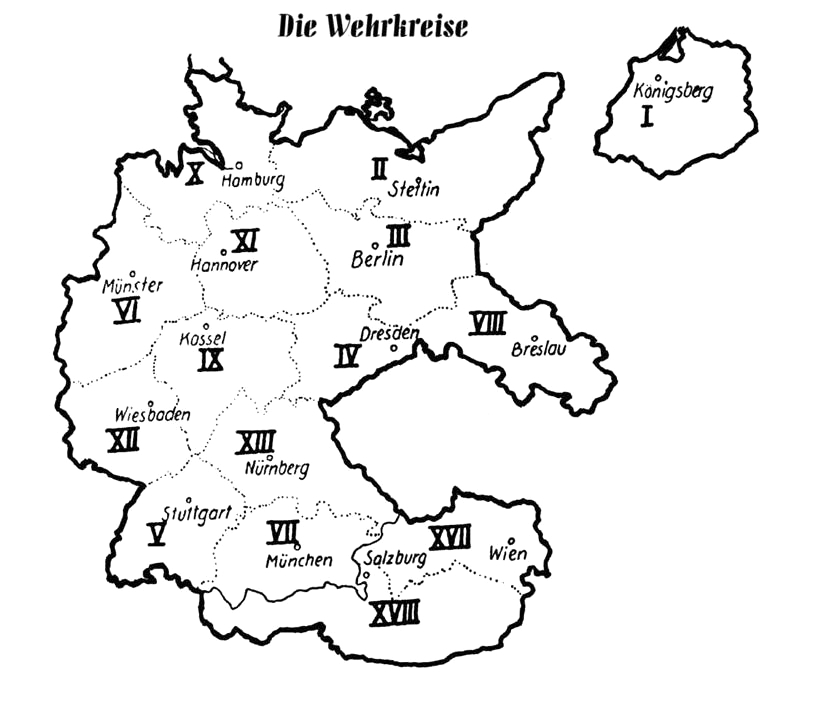
The Wehrkreise after the Anschluss

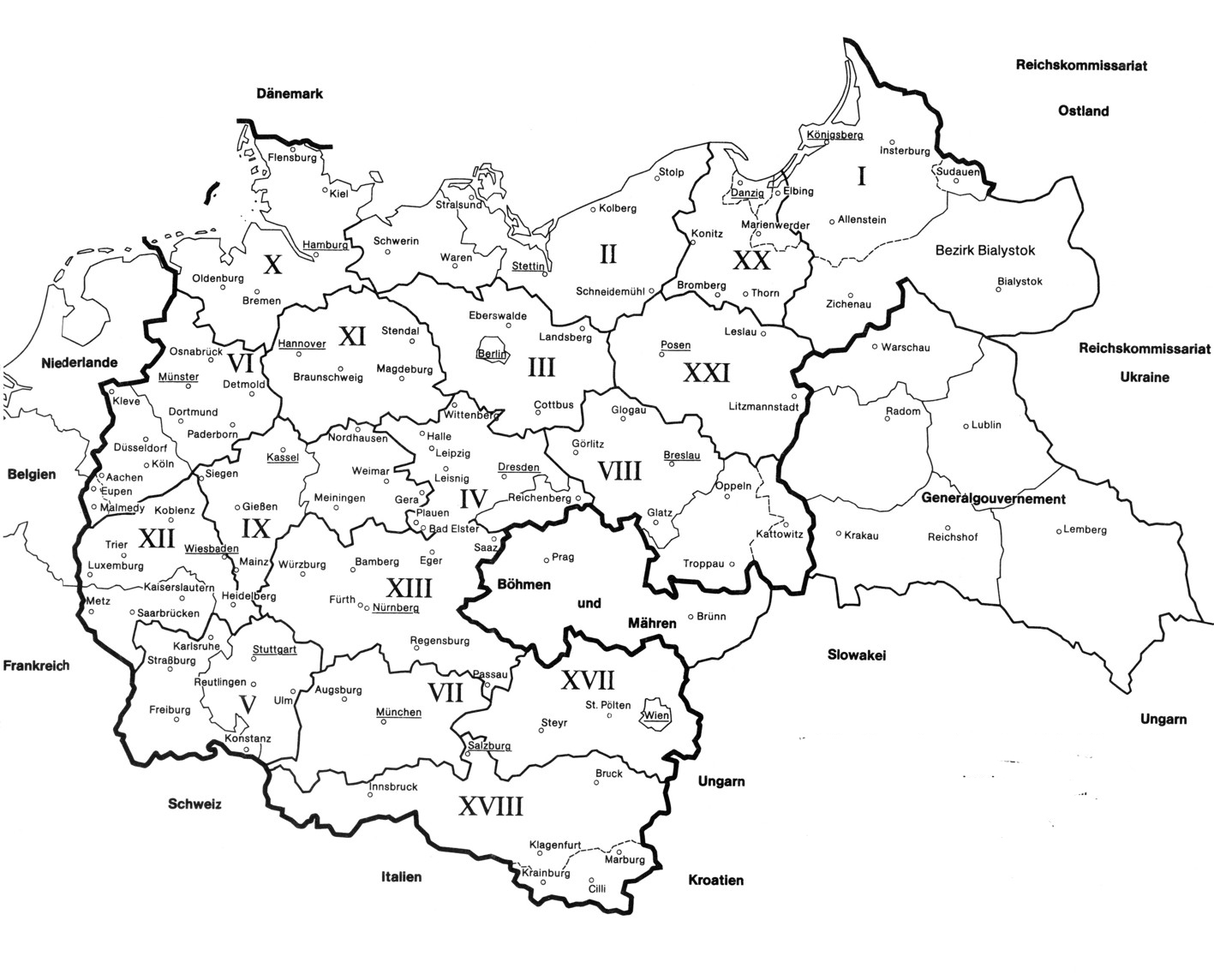
Map of the Wehrkreise in 1943-1944

The military districts, also known in some English-language publications by their German name as Wehrkreise (singular: Wehrkreis), were administrative territorial units in Nazi Germany before and during World War II. The task of military districts was the organization and the handling of reinforcements and resupplies for local military units. The Replacement Army (Ersatzheer) managed the districts. Responsibilities such as training, conscription, supply, and equipment were (at least partially) entrusted to the Ersatzheer.

== History ==
On 30 September 1919, much of the Imperial German Army was dissolved. The Reichswehr (of the Weimar Republic) took its place, and four commands of the type Reichswehrgruppenkommando were created, as well as seven Wehrkreiskommando commands, each assigned to one of the seven initial Wehrkreise of the Weimar Republic (numbered I through VII). The Reichswehrgruppenkommandos (which combined under them several military units across Wehrkreis lines) were soon reduced in number from four to two.

Each of the Wehrkreise were tasked to deploy one division by 1 October 1920 (resulting in the 1st through 7th Divisions of the Reichswehr, with the divisional ordinal number matching the cardinal number of the respective Wehrkreis). These seven (infantry) divisions were additionally joined by three cavalry divisions.

In peacetime, the 13 Wehrkreise were the home to the army corps of the same number and all subordinate units of that formation. The corps commander also commanded the Wehrkreis. Command of the Wehrkreis passed to the corps second-in-command at the outbreak of war.

At the start of the war, there were fifteen Districts in Germany. Two Austrian Districts had been added after the Anschluss of 1938. During the war, four were added, and some Districts had territory added to them from other countries conquered by Germany.

== List of military districts ==
=== Wehrkreis I ===
Wehrkreis I was headquartered at Königsberg and contained the territory of the German exclave of East Prussia, making it also a coastal state on the Baltic Sea coast. Wehrkreis I was the home district of the I Army Corps, which was formed in October 1934 from the 1st Division of the Reichswehr. Wehrkreis I was expanded to include the Memel Territory after the German ultimatum to Lithuania (accepted by Lithuania on 23 March 1939); the Wehrkreis was later given additional territory in the form of the Bialystok District and the Sudauen region.

=== Wehrkreis II ===
Wehrkreis II was headquartered at Stettin and included the territories of the historic provinces of Mecklenburg and Pomerania, which also gave Wehrkreis II the largest share of the German Baltic Sea coast. Wehrkreis II was the home district of the II Army Corps, which was formed in October 1934 from the 2nd Division of the Reichswehr.

=== Wehrkreis III ===
Wehrkreis III was headquartered at Berlin and contained roughly the territories of the modern-day German state of Brandenburg and the historic province of Neumark. Wehrkreis III was the home district of III Army Corps (after June 1942: III Panzer Corps), which was formed in October 1934 from the 3rd Division of the Reichswehr.

=== Wehrkreis IV ===
Wehrkreis IV was headquartered at Dresden and contained the territories of the modern-day German state of Saxony as well as some southern parts of modern-day Saxony-Anhalt. Wehrkreis IV was the home district of IV Army Corps, which was formed in October 1934 from the 4th Division of the Reichswehr. It was later expanded through the addition of parts of northern Bohemia after the Munich Agreement of 1938.

=== Wehrkreis V ===
Wehrkreis V was headquartered at Stuttgart, containing roughly the historic provinces of Baden, Württemberg, and Hohenzollern-Sigmaringen (about equivalent to the modern-day German state of Baden-Württemberg). Wehrkreis V was the home district of V Army Corps, which was formed in October 1934 from the 5th Division of the Reichswehr. After the German victory over France (1940), it was extended to include parts of Alsace.

=== Wehrkreis VI ===
Wehrkreis VI was headquartered at Münster and contained the historic province of Westphalia, much of the Lower Rhine, and parts of modern-day Lower Saxony. Wehrkreis VI was the home district of VI Army Corps, which was formed in October 1934 from the 6th Division of the Reichswehr. After the German occupation of Belgium (1940), parts of eastern Belgium were added to Wehrkreis VI.

=== Wehrkreis VII ===
Wehrkreis VII was headquartered at Munich and contained the south of the modern-day German state of Bavaria. Wehrkreis VII was the home district of VII Army Corps, which was formed in October 1934 from the 7th Division of the Reichswehr.

=== Wehrkreis VIII ===
Wehrkreis VIII was headquartered at Breslau and contained the territory of the historic province of Silesia. Wehrkreis VIII was the home district of VIII Army Corps, which was formed in October 1934, initially disguised as "Heeresdienststelle Breslau". The corps was then given its proper designation as VIII Army Corps in 1935. After the Munich Agreement (1938), parts of northern Moravia were added to the district. After the German invasion of Poland (1939), the territory was further extended to include parts of East Upper Silesia.

=== Wehrkreis IX ===
Wehrkreis IX was headquartered at Kassel and contained territories in central Germany, including parts of modern-day Hesse and Thuringia. Wehrkreis IX was the home district of the IX Army Corps, which was formed in October 1934, initially disguised as "Heeresdienststelle Kassel". The corps was then given its proper designation as IX Army Corps in 1935.

=== Wehrkreis X ===
Wehrkreis X was headquartered at Hamburg. It contained the territories of modern-day Schleswig-Holstein and most of the north of modern-day Lower Saxony, placing Wehrkreis X exclusively in charge of the German North Sea coast, as well as parts of the Baltic Sea coast. Wehrkreis X was the home district of the X Army Corps, which was formed on 15 October 1935 from the Cavalry Corps.

=== Wehrkreis XI ===
Wehrkreis XI was headquartered at Hanover. It contained territories in northern-central Germany, including large parts of what in the modern day is southeastern Lower Saxony and northern Saxony-Anhalt. Wehrkreis XI was the home district of the XI Army Corps, which was formed on 1 October 1936 with headquarters at Hanover.

=== Wehrkreis XII ===
Wehrkreis XII was headquartered at Wiesbaden. Its territory was roughly equivalent to the modern-day German states of Rhineland-Palatinate and Saarland, with the addition of a small part of northern Baden (around Heidelberg). Wehrkreis XII was the home district of the XII Army Corps, which was formed on 1 October 1936 with headquarters at Wiesbaden. After the German victory over France (1940), Wehrkreis XII was expanded through the addition of parts of Lorraine (such as the Metz area).

=== Wehrkreis XIII ===
Wehrkreis XIII was headquartered at Nuremberg. It contained the territories of the historic provinces of Franconia and Upper Palatinate in what is today the northern half of modern-day Bavaria. Wehrkreis XIII was the home district of XIII Army Corps, which was formed on 1 October 1937 with headquarters at Nuremberg. The district was expanded after the Munich Agreement (1938) to include parts of western Bohemia.

=== Wehrkreis XVII ===
Wehrkreis XVII was headquartered at Vienna. It contained the northeastern third of Austria, added to the German Reich after the 1938 Anschluss. Wehrkreis XVII was the home district of XVII Army Corps, which was formed on 1 April 1938 with headquarters at Vienna. The district was expanded after the Munich Agreement (1938) to include parts of southern Bohemia.

=== Wehrkreis XVIII ===
Wehrkreis XVIII was headquartered at Salzburg. It contained the southwestern and southeastern thirds of Austria, added to the German Reich after the 1938 Anschluss. Wehrkreis XVIII was the home district of XVIII Army Corps (after 1940: XVIII Mountain Corps), which was formed on 1 April 1938 with headquarters in Salzburg.

=== Wehrkreis XX ===
Wehrkreis XX was headquartered at Danzig. It contained the historic province of West Prussia, occupied by Germany in the 1939 Invasion of Poland.

=== Wehrkreis XXI ===
Wehrkreis XXI was headquartered at Posen. It contained the territories of the historic region by the same name, occupied by Germany in the 1939 Invasion of Poland.

=== Protectorate Bohemia-Moravia ===
The Protectorate of Bohemia and Moravia was also a Wehrkreis, with respective institutions being created in late 1942.

=== Generalgouvernement ===
The General Government was also a Wehrkreis, with respective institutions being created in 1943.

== Gaps in numbering ==
Several cardinal numbers were not assigned to a particular Wehrkreis and skipped in the numbering. These were 14 (XIV), 15 (XV), 16 (XVI) and 19 (XIX). As the Wehrkreis system was initially tightly bound to the army corps (with each of the thirteen original districts as well as the two Austrian districts being assigned an army corps of the matching ordinal number with its headquarters in that Wehrkreis), these numbers were skipped as they were taken up by the motorized corps (XIV Army Corps, XV Army Corps, XVI Army Corps, XIX Army Corps). The four corps were not inherently bound to one particular military district (but naturally ended up with some connections to their respective peacetime headquarters regardless).

== Usage outside Germany ==
The concept of Wehrkreise were adopted in Indonesian military in 1948, during Indonesian National Revolution. The background of such formations were caused by the Operation Product that mounted by the Dutch East Indies, which caused Renville Agreement. The agreement forced Indonesian military commanders such as Sudirman, T. B. Simatupang, and Abdul Haris Nasution to abandon the traditional linear defense formation of their army; this was formalized in a "strategy command order" issued by Sudirman that same year, which formally adopted the Wehrkreis system, since they viewed the German military district system enabled the Defence in depth in response to the Dutch positional advantages in artificial line that covered in that agreement. General Simatupang noted that he use the term of Wehrkreise from a german book. The establishment of this doctrine resulted in the formation of five Wehrkreise districts in West Java.

Historian Robert Elson rationalize that this strategy enabled the Indonesian army to conduct guerilla warfare in following conflict with Dutch army during Operation Kraai. General Nasution viewed the Wehrkreise system were important for each Indonesian army districts to mount resistance independently. Barry Turner has noted the similarities of Indonesian Wehrkreise implemented by Nasution with the Germans in aspect of dividing of tier forces between the mobile force units and the partisan elements. He also noted the similarities of Nasution Wehrkreise with the territorial warfare conducted by Josip Broz Tito. This system also served as basis for Indonesian army Military Regional Command or KODAM.

Suharto, the second and longest serving president Indonesian republic, once serving as brigade commander under jurisdiction of Yogyakarta Wehrkreise III district during the General Offensive of 1 March 1949.

== See also ==
- Replacement Army
