= Schutzmannschaft =

Collaborationist police force of Nazi-occupied areas of the Soviet Union during WWII

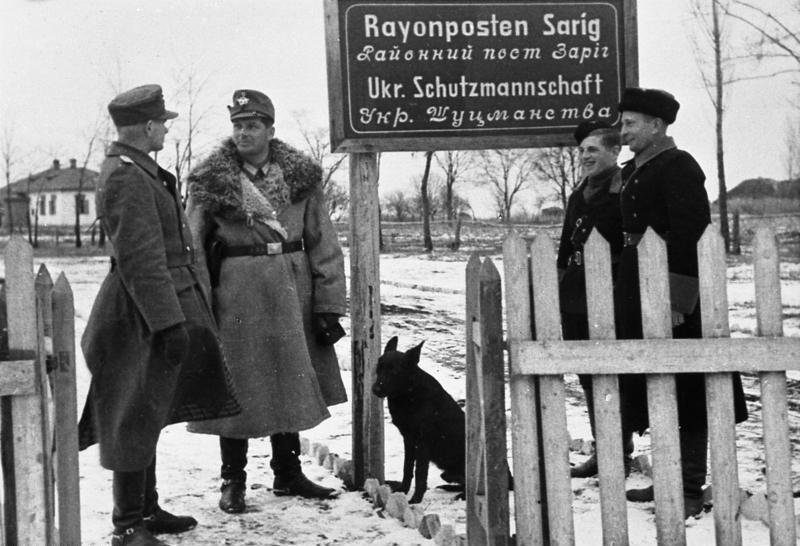
- German Order Police officer visiting the Ukrainian Schutzmannschaft unit in Zarig near Kiev, December 1942
- Active: Founded in July 1941 by Heinrich Himmler
- Country: German-occupied Eastern Europe
- Allegiance: Ordnungspolizei
- Branch: Schutzstaffel
- Type: Auxiliary police
- Size: 300,000

The Schutzmannschaft, or Auxiliary Police (lit. "protection team"; plural: Schutzmannschaften, (Note: Schutzmann and Schutzmannschaft should not be translated literally. It is an old-fashioned German word for police, which was adopted to distinguish the indigenous police from the German police.) abbreviated as Schuma) was the collaborationist auxiliary police of native policemen serving in those areas of the Soviet Union and the Baltic states occupied by Nazi Germany during World War II. Heinrich Himmler, head of the Schutzstaffel (SS), established the Schutzmannschaft on 25 July 1941, and subordinated it to the Order Police (Ordnungspolizei; Orpo). By the end of 1941, some 45,000 men served in Schutzmannschaft units, about half of them in the battalions. During 1942, Schutzmannschaften expanded to an estimated 300,000 men, with battalions accounting for about a third, or less than one half of the local force. Everywhere, local police far outnumbered the equivalent German personnel several times; in most places, the ratio of Germans to natives was about 1-to-10.

The auxiliary police battalions (Schutzmannschaft-Bataillone) were created to provide security in the occupied territories, in particular by combating the anti-Nazi resistance. Many of these battalions participated in the Holocaust and caused thousands of Jewish deaths. Usually the battalions were voluntary units and were not directly involved in combat. In total, about 200 battalions were formed. There were approximately 21 ethnic Estonian, (Note: 26 battalions were planned for Estonia, but only 21 were actually formed.) 47 Latvian, 26 Lithuanian, (Note: The short-lived 13 battalions of the Lithuanian Territorial Defense Force were numbered as Schutzmannschaft battalions 241–243 and 301–310, but the force is usually not included in discussions about the Lithuanian Schutzmannschaft.) 11 Belarusian, 8 Tatar, and 71 Ukrainian Schuma battalions. Each battalion had an authorized strength of about 500, but the actual size varied greatly. They should not be confused with native German Order Police battalions (SS-Polizei-Bataillone) which the Order Police formed between 1939 and 1945 and which also participated in the Holocaust.

The Order Police organized the Schutzmannschaften by nationality: Belarusian, Estonian, Latvian, Lithuanian, and Ukrainian.

== Formation ==
The Germans did not want to use local collaborators on a large scale as they were deemed to be unreliable and inferior (Untermensch). However, the rapid German advance in the Eastern Front and manpower shortages forced the Germans to reconsider. Therefore, on 25 July 1941, Reichsführer-SS Himmler authorized creation of Schutzmannschaft. Initially, it was called Hilfspolizei, but Germans did not want to attach a reputable police title to this force. Schutzmannschaften were an integral part of the German police structure and dealt with a variety of issues, including everyday crimes (except when concerning German citizens). Initially, only a small fraction of local auxiliaries were armed. Due to limited supervision, particularly in rural areas, members of Schutzmannschaften had considerable power and there were frequent complaints of corruption and abuse.

Local policemen serving in Schutzmannschaften at the end of 1942
Territory	Police battalions	Police stations	Shuma Total	German Orpo Police
Ostland	23,758	31,804	54,984	4,442
Ukraine	35,000	70,000	105,000	10,194
Military administration	140,000			14,194
Grand total	299,984			28,830

Initially, Schutzmannschaften were organized based on existing police structures and spontaneous anti-Soviet groups that formed at the start of the German invasion of the Soviet Union. For example, in Lithuania, Schutzmannschaften absorbed units formed by the Provisional Government. Due to this legacy and its semi-military status, Lithuanians associated police battalions with their national aspirations of independent Lithuania. This caused a rift within German ranks: ideologues like Hitler and Himmler saw no place for Baltic nationalism within the Greater Germanic Reich, but the Nazis needed local collaboration and had to maintain at least a shadow of national institutions.

Local men joined Schutzmannschaften for a variety of reasons. A number of them had prior police or military experience and wanted a job which paid steady wages and provided food rations. Joining the German war apparatus also provided certain privileges and protections for the men and their families (for example, exemption from forced labor). Pensions were available to family members of those killed in anti-partisan operations. Others were motivated by ideological reasons (antisemitism, anticommunism, nationalism) or by opportunities to loot property of murdered Jews. Captured Soviet POWs saw becoming Schutzmannschaften as a way to avoid concentration camps. Such considerations attracted criminals and other opportunists. Most were young: in 1944, about half of Schutzmannschaften near Mir were under 25 years of age. Germans complained about their lack of training, discipline, and in some cases refused to supply them with weapons. During 1942, in compliance with orders to enlarge Schutzmannschaft, Germans began to force men to sign up for the service and eliminated service term limits (initially men signed up for one-year or six-month terms). There was a marked difference in attitudes of more enthusiastic early volunteers and later forced recruits. To increase their reliability, Himmler ordered the organization of NCO training, which would include political education, that lasted up to eight weeks.

== Organization ==
The Schutzmannschaft comprised four sections:

- Schutzmannschaft-Einzeldienst (stationary regular police; patrolmen in cities and districts)
- Schutzmannschaft-Bataillonen (mobile police battalions for Nazi security warfare)
- Hilfsschutzmannschaft (reserve units – guarded POWs and carried out work-details)
- Feuerschutzmannschaft (fire brigades)

== Police battalions ==
=== Organization ===
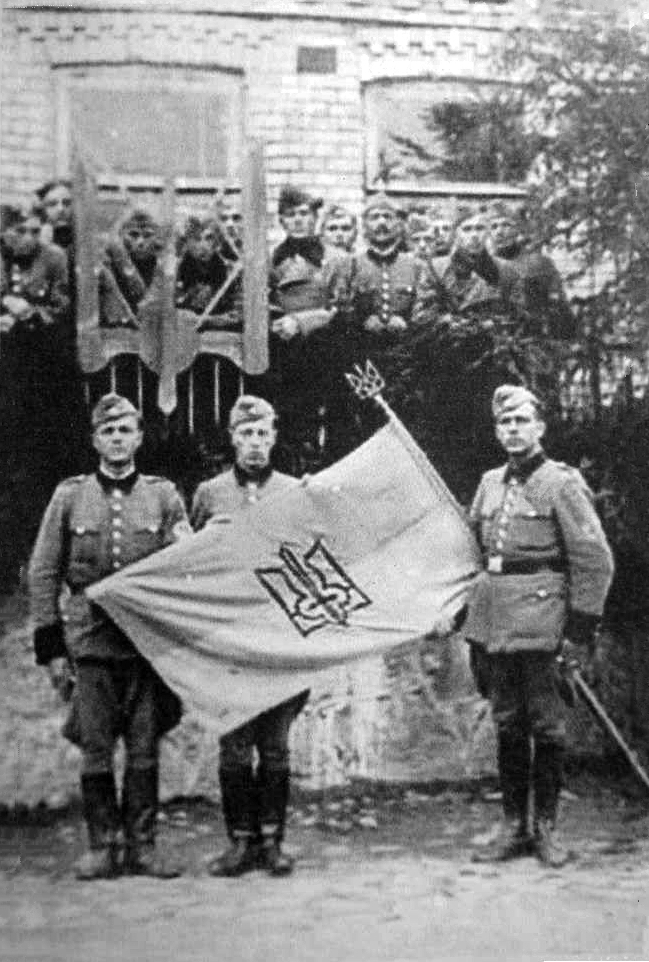
Men of the 115th Battalion (Ukrainian) Schutzmannschaft holding a flag with the coat of arms of Ukraine

Police battalions were divided based on their intended functions into five categories:

- Schutzmannschaft-Front-Bataillonen (combat)
- Schutzmannschaft-Wach-Bataillonen (guard)
- Schutzmannschaft-Ersatz-Bataillonen (reserve/replacement)
- Schutzmannschaft-Pionier-Bataillonen (engineer)
- Schutzmannschaft-Bau-Bataillonen (construction)

Each battalion had a projected number of four companies of 124 men each, one with a machine gun group and three groups of infantry. In reality, the numbers varied greatly between occupied territories. Baltic (Lithuanian, Latvian, Estonian) battalions were commanded by a native, while Ukrainian and Belarusian battalions had German commanders. The battalions did not have a prescribed uniform and often used uniforms from pre-war national armies. They were identified by a white armband which usually had the inscription Schutzmann, a service number and location. In Directive no. 46, Hitler expressly prohibited Schutzmannschaft to use German badges of rank, the eagle and swastika emblems, or German military shoulder straps. However, members of Schutzmannschaften were eligible for various awards and decorations, including the Iron Cross and War Merit Cross. Schutzmannschaften were generally armed with confiscated Soviet rifles and some officers had pistols. Machine guns were used in anti-partisan operations and mortars were employed in the later stages of the war. In general, the battalions were poorly provided for, sometimes even lacking food rations, as priority and preference was given to German units fighting in the front lines.

=== Battalion numbers ===
The Schutzmannschaft battalions were organized by nationality: Ukrainians, Belarusians, Estonians, Lithuanians, Latvians, Tatars. Germans attempted to organize police battalions in occupied Poland, but did not find volunteers and had to use force in forming the single Polish Schutzmannschaft Battalion 202. The battalions were initially allotted numbers as follows (in brackets: re-allotted numbers in 1942; not all numbers were actually used):

- Reichskommissariat Ostland: battalions 1 to 50
  - Lithuanian Auxiliary Police: battalions 1 to 15 (1–15, 250–265, 301–310)
  - Latvian Auxiliary Police: battalions 16 to 28 (16–28, 266–285, 311–328)
  - Estonian Auxiliary Police: battalions 29 to 40 (29–45, 50, 286–293)
  - Belarusian Auxiliary Police: battalions 41 to 50 (46–49)
- Reichskommissariat Moskowien: battalions 51 to 100
- Reichskommissariat Ukraine: battalions 101 to 200
  - Ukrainian Auxiliary Police (including Tatar units)

=== Activities and role in the Holocaust ===
The battalions were not confined to their locations and could be easily moved to locations far outside their home country. Since formation of the battalions was particularly slow in Belarus, many of them were first stationed there. One of the first tasks of the battalions was mass execution of Jews. Attached to Einsatzgruppen as needed, the battalions rounded up, executed, and disposed of Jews. For example, it is estimated that Lithuanian Schutzmannschaft killed 78,000 Jews in Lithuania and Belarus. The mass executions largely ceased by the end of 1941. By that time German advance into Soviet Union halted and Nazi officials considered using the battalions for more direct military duties. In particular, Franz Walter Stahlecker asked to relieve the 16th Army in the Demyansk Pocket. However, Hitler refused. In Directive no. 46, dated August 1942, he agreed to strengthen and enlarge Schutzmannschaft, but to use it only for Nazi security warfare and other auxiliary duties behind the front lines. Some battalions continued to participate in the Holocaust (guarding or liquidating Nazi ghettos). About 12,000 men guarded forced laborers (Soviet POWs, civilians, Jews) working on the Durchgangsstrasse IV, a major road from Lemberg (now Lviv) to Stalino (now Donetsk). The issue of involving Schutzmannschaft in combat was revisited after the Battle of Stalingrad. Some Schutzmannschaft battalions in Estonia, Latvia, Ukraine and elsewhere were reorganized into Waffen-SS divisions wearing national insignia.

Deserters were a constant problem for the battalions. For example, some 3,000 men deserted Lithuanian Schutzmannschaft between September 1943 and April 1944. After the war, many former members of Schutzmannschaft fled to the West. A survey of about 200 men revealed that more than 30% had escaped from the Soviet zone. Western authorities showed much less interest in members of Schutzmannschaft than in German Nazis and did not prosecute them. The Soviet Union persecuted members of Schutzmannschaft, often sentencing them to death. For example, in Lithuania, 14 men were sentenced to 25 years in Gulag in 1948, 8 men were sentenced to death in 1962, one man executed in 1979. After the dissolution of the Soviet Union, several former members of the Schutzmannschaft were denaturalized by the United States or Canada and deported back to their countries.

== Ranks ==
Estonian, Latvian, Lithuanian		Ukrainian, Belarusian		Equivalent in the Ordnungspolizei	Equivalent in the Army
(June 1942)	(November 1942)	(June 1942)	(Later)	Equivalent in the Ordnungspolizei	Equivalent in the Army
Schutzmann	Schutzmann	Schutzmann	Schutzmann	Anwärter	Schütze
Unterkorporal	Oberschutzmann	Unterkorporal	Unterkorporal	Unterwachtmeister	Gefreiter
Vizekorporal	Revieroberschutzmann	Vizekorporal	Vizekorporal	Rottwachtmeister	Obergefreiter
Korporal	Hauptschutzmann	Korporal	Korporal	Wachtmeister	Unteroffizier
Vizefeldwebel	Stabsschutzmann	Vizefeldwebel	Vizefeldwebel	Zugwachtmeister	Feldwebel
Kompaniefeldwebel	Revierstabsschutzmann	Kompaniefeldwebel	Kompaniefeldwebel	Hauptwachtmeister	Oberfeldwebel
Zugführer	Leutnant	Zugführer	Lieutenant	Leutnant	Leutnant
Oberzugführer	Oberleutnant	Oberzugführer	Starshiy Lieutenant	Oberleutnant	Oberleutnant
Kompanieführer	Hauptmann	Kompanieführer	Kapitan	Hauptmann	Hauptmann
Batallionsführer	Major	Bataillonsführer	Mayor	Major	Major
	Oberstleutnant			Oberstleutnant	Oberstleutnant

== See also ==
- Walloon Guard and Flemish Guard—a collaborationist police unit in German-occupied Belgium

== Bibliography ==
- Abbott, Peter (1983). Partisan Warfare 1941–45. Men-at-arms. Vol. 142. Osprey Publishing. ISBN 9780850455137.
- Abbott, Peter; Pinak, Eugene (2012). Ukrainian Armies 1914–55. Men-at-arms. Vol. 412. Osprey Publishing. ISBN 9781780964010.
- Angrick, Andrej (2008). "Annihilation and Labor: Jews and Thoroughfare IV in Central Ukraine". In Brandon, Ray; Lower, Wendy (eds.). The Shoah in Ukraine: History, Testimony, Memorialization. Bloomington: Indiana University Press. ISBN 9780253350848.
- Arad, Yitzhak (2009). The Holocaust in the Soviet Union. University of Nebraska Press. ISBN 9780803222700.
- Brandon, Ray; Lower, Wendy (2008). The Shoah in Ukraine: history, testimony, memorialization. Indiana University Press. p. 268. ISBN 978-0253350848.
- Breitman, Richard (1990). "Himmler's Police Auxiliaries in the Occupied Soviet Territories". Simon Wiesenthal Center Annual (7). ISSN 0741-8450. Archived from the original on 11 March 2009.
- Browning, Christopher R. (2002). "Ordinary Germans or Ordinary Men? A Reply to the Critics". In Berenbaum, Michael; Peck, Abraham J. (eds.). The Holocaust and History: The Known, the Unknown, the Disputed, and the Reexamined. Indiana University Press. ISBN 9780253215291.
- Bubnys, Arūnas (February–April 1991). "Lietuvos vietinė rinktinė ir nauji bandymai mobilizuoti Lietuvos vyrus 1944 metais". Voruta (in Lithuanian). ISSN 2029-3534.
- Bubnys, Arūnas (1998). Vokiečių okupuota Lietuva (1941–1944) (in Lithuanian). Lietuvos gyventojų genocido ir rezistencijos tyrimo centras. ISBN 9986-757-12-6.
- Bubnys, Arūnas (2000), Lithuanian Police Battalions and the Holocaust (1941–1943) (PDF), The International Commission for the Evaluation of the Crimes of the Nazi and Soviet Occupation Regimes in Lithuania, archived from the original (PDF) on 22 July 2011
- Bubnys, Arūnas (2017). Lietuvių policijos batalionai 1941–1945 m. Vilnius: Lietuvos gyventojų genocido ir rezistencijos tyrimo centras. ISBN 978-609-8037-68-5.
- Dean, Martin (2003). Collaboration in the Holocaust: Crimes of the Local Police in Belorussia and Ukraine, 1941-44. Palgrave Macmillan. ISBN 9781403963710.
- Goldhagen, Daniel Jonah (2007). Hitler's Willing Executioners: Ordinary Germans and the Holocaust. Knopf Doubleday Publishing Group. ISBN 9780307426239.
- Jurado, Carlos; Thomas, Nigel (2012). Germany's Eastern Front allies (2): Baltic forces. Men-at-arms. Vol. 363. Osprey Publishing. ISBN 9781780967943.
- Mollo, Andrew (1992). Uniforms of the SS. Vol. 5. London: Windrow & Greene. ISBN 9781872004624.
- Niewiński, Jan (2005). Stosunki polsko-ukraińskie: "Głos Kresowian". Muzeum Historii Polskiego Ruchu Ludowego. ISBN 8360093105.
- Niglas, Aivar; Hiio, Toomas (2006). "Ranks of Defence Battalion soldiers, non-commissioned officers and officers" (PDF). Estonia 1940-1945: Reports of the Estonian International Commission for the Investigation of Crimes Against Humanity. Tallinn: Estonian Institute of Historical Memory. ISBN 9949-13-040-9. Archived from the original (PDF) on 5 March 2016.
- Rudling, Anders (2011). "Szkolenie w mordowaniu: Schutzmannschaft Battalion 201 i Hauptmann Roman Szuchewycz na Białorusi 1942 roku" [Schooling in Murder: Schutzmannschaft Battalion 201]. In Paź, Bogusław (ed.). Prawda historyczna a prawda polityczna w badaniach naukowych. Przykład ludobójstwa na kresach połudiowej-wschodniej Polski w latach 1939–1946. Wrocław: Wydawnictwo uniwersytetu Wrocławskiego. pp. 191–212. ISBN 978-83-229-3185-1.
- Schiessl, Christoph (2009). The Search for Nazi Collaborators in the United States (PhD thesis). ISBN 9781109090079.
- Stankeras, Pertas (2008). Lietuvių policija Antrajame pasauliniame kare (in Lithuanian). Mintis. ISBN 978-5-417-00958-7.
- Stoliarovas, Andriejus (2008). Lietuvių pagalbinės policijos (apsaugos) 12-asis batalionas (Thesis) (in Lithuanian). Vytautas Magnus University.
