= Schutzmannschaft Battalion 10 =

Schutzmannschaft Battalion 10 may refer to:

- 10th Lithuanian Police Battalion (1941 August – 1943 January 31).
- 256th Lithuanian Police Battalion (24 March 1943 – 8 May 1945) which was first named as the 10th Lithuanian Police Battalion until 13 August 1943.
