= Litauische Bau-Bataillonen =

WW2 auxiliary engineering units of the German Wehrmacht

The Litauische Bau-Bataillonen or Lithuanian Construction Battalions (Lithuanian: Lietuvių statybos (inžinerijos) batalionai) were five auxiliary pioneer battalions of the Wehrmacht (Nazi Germany) during World War II. Formed in 1943, they consisted mostly of conscripted Lithuanians with only a small number of Germans. In total, about 2,500–3,000 men served in the battalions. They were attached to German engineering units under the Army Group North. They were sent to the Eastern Front where they constructed and repaired roads, bridges, bunkers, anti-tank obstacles, and other military fortifications. They were labor (not combat) units though they engaged Soviet partisans on several occasions. A few times, Lithuanian formations were used to plunder and burn Russian villages according to German scorched earth tactics. The battalions were disbanded and absorbed by various other units in 1944.

== Formation ==
Litauische Bau-Bataillonen
Battalion	Formed in	Departed	Disbanded	Commanders
I	Kaunas	May 5, 1943	June 1944	Colonel lieutenant Kazys Pranckevičius
II	Panevėžys	May 14, 1943	August 1944	Colonel lieutenant Vladas Strimas; Major Aleksandras Milaševičius
III	Vilnius	June 2, 1943	May 1944	Major Simas Narušis
IV	Panevėžys	June 8, 1943	1945?	Major Juozas Černius
V	Panevėžys	August 4, 1943	May 1944	Major Stepas Nagrodskis

After the major defeat at Stalingrad in early 1943, Nazi Germany expanded its recruitment efforts to non-Germans. The efforts to form a Lithuanian Waffen-SS legion failed and the Lithuanian Territorial Defense Force was disbanded. German officials then shifted their strategy in an attempt to form auxiliary units. The process was supervised by Major General Emil Just (1885–1947), chief military commandant in occupied Lithuania. His proclamations were better received by the Lithuanians: the Wehrmacht was still somewhat respected unlike the SS or the civil administration (Generalbezirk Litauen). The propaganda also exploited Just's fatherly figure and distant Lithuanian heritage. The official ceremony of sending out the first group of about 120 Lithuanian volunteers was held on March 20, 1943.

This was clearly not enough and a mandatory registration was announced for men born in 1919–1924 on April 6 and for men born in 1912–1918 and 1925 on June 10 by Theodor Adrian von Renteln. This was equivalent to a mobilization. The sluggish registration prompted Nazi officials, including Petras Kubiliūnas, to threaten repressions. Most common repressions were arrests of parents or other relatives of those who failed to register. However, the Germans lacked the manpower to enforce the registrations while Lithuanian officials quietly sabotaged the efforts. Therefore, the mobilization failed: only about 3,000 out of estimated 100,000 eligible men were taken for military duty. Most of the registered men were taken to Bau-Bataillonen, the rest to Lithuanian Schutzmannschaft or auxiliary German air-defense battalions. More people were taken for forced labor in Germany. In total, five Bau-Bataillonen were formed; there were attempts to form the 6th battalion but it seems it was never fully formed. Each battalion was officially sent off to the front with a pompous public ceremony: streets were decorated with Lithuanian and Nazi flags, orchestras played music, men received flowers, officials delivered speeches. Propaganda press lauded the joint Lithuanian and German effort in combating Communism.

== Structure, personnel, activities ==
Each battalion was divided into four companies – one transport (with 200 horses) and three construction. In total, each battalion was to have 600–700 men, but none of the battalions were fully formed and had only 400–500 men. Initially, the battalions were not armed – each company had only 20 shotguns for guard duties. Later, when Soviet partisans became more active, the battalions received more weapons, including light machine guns. The men wore German uniforms with Lithuanian insignia. Privates were paid a monthly salary of 37.5–52 Reichsmarks with additional 100 Reichsmarks for family support.

The battalions had a number of educated and experienced former officers of the Lithuanian Army, but also a number of high school students and others with no military education or experience. Due to lack of training, the battalions initially were simple labor battalions and only later became military pioneer units. The battalions had German officers, about 5 or 7 in each company. They were the military staff and directed the units; Lithuanian officers followed their orders and dealt with the privates. There was often a friction between the supervising Germans and the laboring Lithuanians. The battalions suffered from lack of discipline and morale. Desertion was common, even at the time of battalion formation, and particularly increased during the winter months. Anti-Nazi resistance claimed that some Lithuanian officers supported and even initiated the desertions.

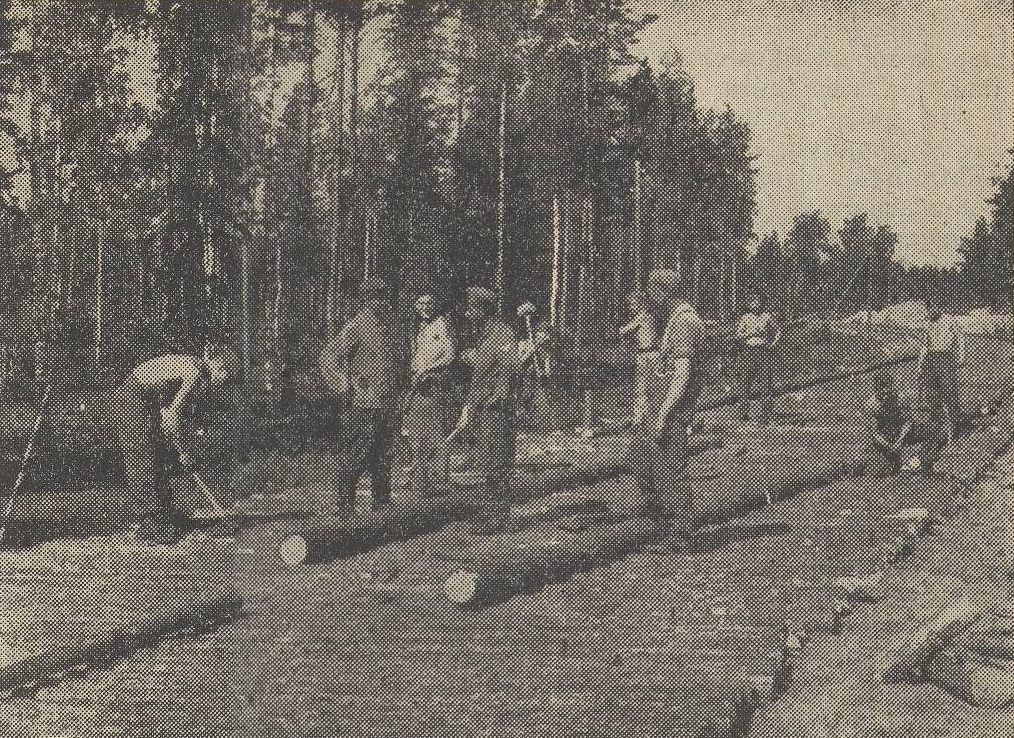
Soldiers of the Lithuanian Construction Battalions engaged in road construction work on the Eastern Front

The men constructed and repaired roads, bridges, bunkers, anti-tank obstacles, and other military fortifications. It was hard, exhausting labor. They worked 8 hours a day. In addition, they had two hours of military training and formation. One of the more controversial aspects of Bau-Bataillonen was their relationship with local residents. Initially it seems that the Lithuanians generally got along with local residents, even occasionally helping them out in farms. However, that changed once Germans started retreating and leaving scorched earth behind. Germans and their Lithuanian auxiliaries confiscated and destroyed property, burned villages, forcefully evacuated residents towards Germany, etc.

The battalions were not used in combat. However, they worked on military projects that were subject to sabotage efforts by Soviet partisans. Therefore, the units had to be on guard and patrol and occasionally engaged the partisans in shootouts. For example, men from the 2nd battalion were ambushed while transporting food from Pskov; a few taken captive and a few were killed. The Germans organized a day-long hunt for the partisans which also involved the Lithuanians. These, however, were incidental activities. The Bau-Bataillonen suffered only occasional casualties, some due to work accidents, others due to partisan activities.

== Activities of individual units ==
=== 1st Battalion ===
The 1st battalion was sent near Luga between Pskov and Leningrad on the Saint Petersburg–Warsaw railway. There, the men cut forest and built a 10-kilometre (6.2 mi) corduroy road over sandy soil. In September 1943, they were moved near Pskov where they dug anti-tank trenches and built other fortifications of reinforced concrete. In early 1944, it was moved to Polotsk and later Braslaw. There the unit was disbanded, the remaining men assigned to the Wehrmacht 793rd Pioneer Battalion. They retreated through Latvia into the Courland Pocket where they surrendered.

=== 2nd Battalion ===
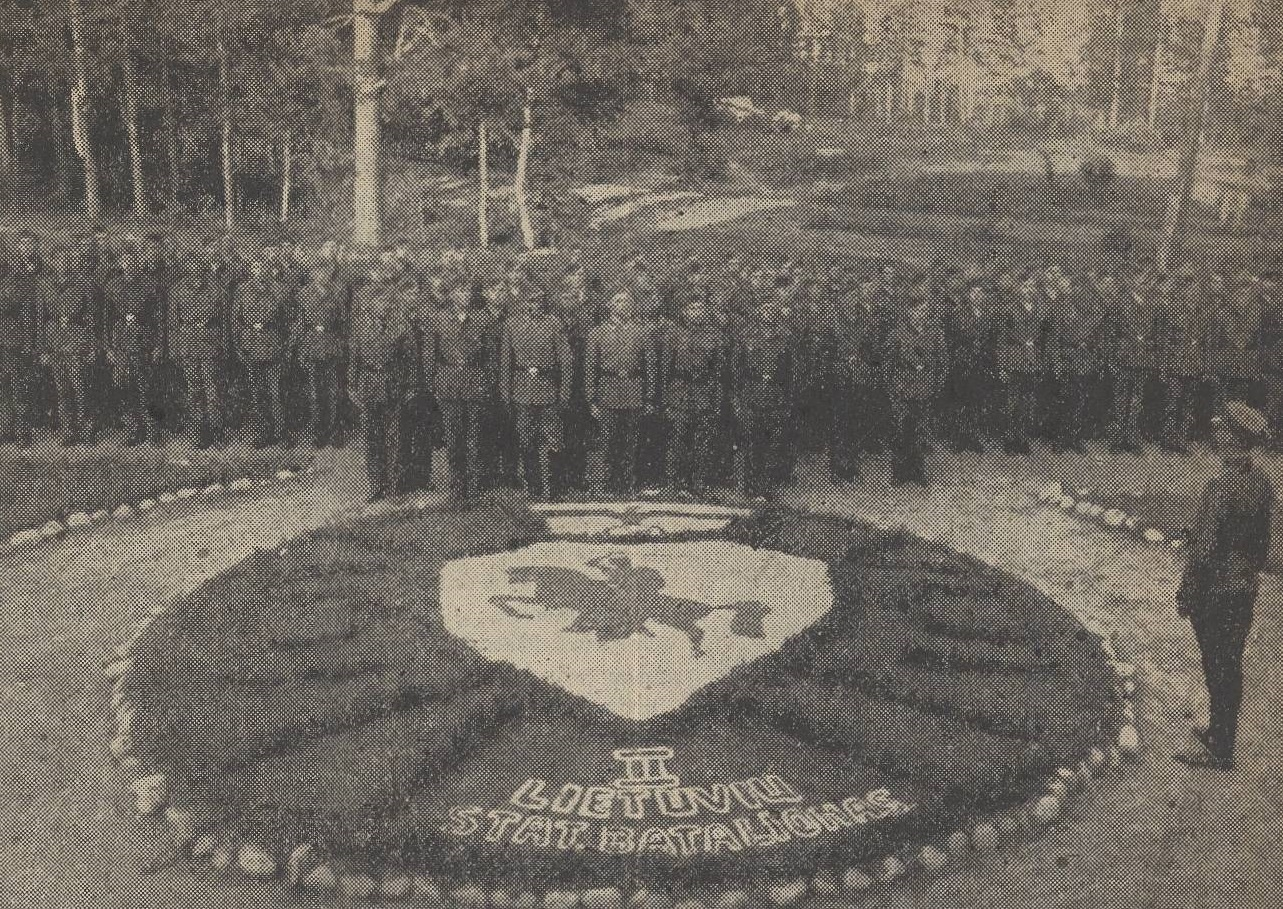
2nd Lithuanian Construction Battalion standing in formation

The 2nd battalion was known for discipline issues even before its departure from Panevėžys. It was sent near Luga as well. After an incident, that was variously described as either a mutiny or a drunken shootout, unit's commanders were replaced, several men arrested, and few others executed for desertion. The new Lithuanian commander, Alesandras Milaševičius, was promoted from captain to major and seemed to have had better control of the men. In September 1943, the 2nd battalion was moved near Pskov where they built bunkers, dug anti-tank trenches, and constructed bases for mortars. Colonel Adolfas Birontas officially inspected the unit in February 1944 and was impressed by men's discipline and satisfied with their living conditions. In March 1944, the unit arrived to the Zarasai district in Lithuania. Those that agreed were sent off to the front lines; others were put to work on trenches that would serve as continuation of the Daugavpils fortifications. These works were abandoned in April 1944 and the remaining men were taken towards Daugavpils.

=== 3rd Battalion ===
Information about the 3rd battalion is particularly fragmentary.

=== 4th Battalion ===
The 4th battalion was commanded by Major Juozas Černius who showed more genuine enthusiasm for the German cause. In March 1944, the 4th battalion arrived to Zarasai with the 2nd battalion. Three companies from the 4th battalion were reassigned to the 252nd Infantry Division in early 1945.

=== 5th Battalion ===
The 5th battalion was formed later and had a 4-week training. It was sent near Tolmachyovo. In September 1943, it was moved to the Velikaya River about 30 kilometres (19 mi) southeast of Ostrov, Pskov Oblast, where it was assigned to the 510th Pioneer Battalion. The battalion had discipline issues, there were shootouts. Several members of the battalion, including lieutenant Jonas Borevičius, joined Soviet partisans that were active across the Velikaya River. Realizing the propaganda potential, Lithuanian communist leader Antanas Sniečkus asked the partisans to send Borevičius to Moscow, but it was done only in May 1944 when the Red Army had gained control of the territory.

== Post-war activities ==
There is no summarizing data on post-war activities of the men that served in Bau-Bataillonen, only fragmentary individual stories that show a great variety of fates. Deserters were usually not caught; some of them were later drafted into the Red Army or joined the Lithuanian partisans. Deserters who joined Soviet partisans were often sent to the 16th Rifle Division. When the battalions were disbanded, a number of men were absorbed into other German units. These units usually surrendered to the Russians and were transferred to NKVD prison camps. However, most were soon released as KGB initially focused on more "serious" collaborators, such as members of the Schutzmannschaft or Russian Liberation Army. Former members of the Litauische Bau-Bataillonen became an interest in the late 1940s and early 1950s. For example, in July–September 1949, eight former members of the first battalion were arrested, tried according to the Article 58 of the Penal Code, and sentenced to 25 or 10 years of corrective labor.

A few managed to retreat to Germany and move to the United States after the war. An exceptional case was Major Aleksandras Milaševičius-Ruonis, who retreated to Germany but his family was killed in the Dresden bombing. He returned to Lithuania, became commander of the Lithuanian partisans, and was killed in action in 1949.

== Documentation and historiography ==
The Litauische Bau-Bataillonen is a poorly researched subject. Lithuanian researcher Rimantas Zizas was the first to publish a more comprehensive study of the battalions in 2000. The main obstacle to academic research is the lack of reliable sources. Lithuanian archives provide an incomplete picture as they mostly have documents on mobilization and formation of the battalions. Documents related to battalion activities are most likely spread among various Russian and German archives and await further examination. The contemporary press wrote quite extensively about the battalions, but those articles were vague to protect military secrets, and had a clear bias, either pro- or anti-German. Post-war documents, produced by various Soviet authorities, have a clear anti-German bias; most are KGB interrogation protocols of former battalion soldiers; these prisoners were often tortured to extract confessions. The Soviets were not interested in comprehensive histories and focused on battalions' engagements with Soviet partisans and repressions against civilians. Former soldiers did not produce extensive memoirs; Zizas identified only memoirs of Pranas Nagys as valuable.

== Bibliography ==
- Stankeras, Pertas (2008). Lietuvių policija Antrajame pasauliniame kare (in Lithuanian). Mintis. ISBN 978-5-417-00958-7.
- Stankeras, Pertas (2016). "Statybos batalionai". In Manelis, Eugenijus; Račis, Antanas (eds.). Lietuvos istorija. Enciklopedinis žinynas (in Lithuanian). Vol. II. Mokslo ir enciklopedijų leidybos centras. ISBN 978-5-420-01765-4.
- Zizas, Rimantas (2000). "Lietuvių statybos (inžinerijos) batalionai 1943-1944 m." [Lithuanian construction (engineering) battalions 1943-1944]. Karo Archyvas (in Lithuanian). 16. ISSN 1392-6489.
