= Lithuanian Auxiliary Police =

Lithuanian collaborationist police units during World War II

- Litauische Hilfspolizei
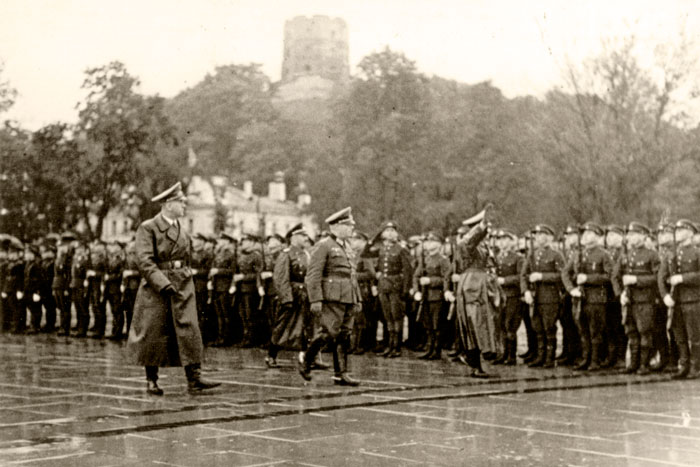
- Lithuanian Schutzmannschaft standing in formation in Vilnius Cathedral Square
- Active: July 9, 1941 - May 1945
- Allegiance: Nazi Germany
- Type: Schutzmannschaft

Commanders
- Notable commanders: Lucian Wysocki, SSPF in Generalbezirk Litauen; A. Engel, KdO; Antanas Špokevičius, inspector of the Lithuanian police battalions; Antanas Rėklaitis, head of the staff

The Lithuanian Auxiliary Police was a Schutzmannschaft formation formed during the German occupation of Lithuania between 1941 and 1944, with the first battalions originating from the most reliable freedom fighters, disbanded following the 1941 anti-Soviet Lithuanian June Uprising in 1941. Lithuanian activists hoped that these units would be the basis of a reestablished Lithuanian Army commanded by the Lithuanian Provisional Government. Instead, they were put under the orders of the SS- und Polizeiführer in Lithuania.

Lithuanian auxiliary policemen were divided into four types. The first three were: regular law enforcement policemen, firefighting policemen, and auxiliary units grouped into platoons that assisted the local police when needed. The last were Lithuanian Schutzmannschaft battalions, closed formations organized into battalions, companies, platoons and groups.

The battalions were charged with internal security duties and engaged in anti-partisan operations in the Wehrmacht's rear areas, e.g. Ukraine, Belarus, Poland and Northwest Russia. Some battalions took part in the Holocaust, most notably the 12th and the 13th battalions, which started as the Lithuanian TDA Battalions. These two battalions were responsible for an estimated 78,000 Jewish deaths in Lithuania and Belarus. While the battalions were often deployed outside Lithuania, they generally did not participate in combat. In total, 26 battalions were formed and approximately 20,000 men served in them. In July to September 1944, the remaining units were combined into two Lithuanian Volunteer Infantry Regiments.

== Terminology ==
The units are known under a number of names. German documents referred to them as Ordnungsdienst (order service), Selbstschutz (self-defense), and Hilfspolizei (auxiliary police). From September 1941, they became known as Schutzmannschaft-Bataillonen (abbreviated Schuma). In Lithuanian, the police battalions were known as savisaugos batalionai (self-defense battalions), apsaugos dalys (security units), Lietuvos apsaugos dalys (LAD, security units of Lithuania).

== Sources and historiography ==
Lithuanian Police Battalions are controversial and poorly researched. The main obstacle is the lack of reliable and objective data. During the war, journal Karys published frequent stories about the battalions, but to protect military secrets the articles were heavily censored to remove names, dates, and locations. During the Soviet period, when Soviet propaganda exploited tales of war crimes and actively persecuted former members of the battalions, objective research was impossible. Several members of the battalions managed to escape to the West and publish memoirs, but they gloss over the controversial aspects of the battalions and often deny Lithuanian involvement in the Holocaust. Foreign researchers were hampered by lack of archival data.

When Lithuania declared independence, the archives became accessible to scholars. However, the documents are scattered in various archives in Lithuania, Belarus, Ukraine, Germany and Russia. In addition, recordkeeping was poor, particularly towards the end of the war. The units were subject to frequent reorganizations and restructurings; sometimes the units were themselves confused about their names or numbers. In the post-war years, the KGB produced interrogation protocols of former members of the battalions, but these are not considered reliable, as confessions were often obtained through torture or fabricated outright. Nevertheless, Lithuanian scholars, primarily Arūnas Bubnys, have published several articles analyzing the structure and activities of individual battalions.

== Background ==
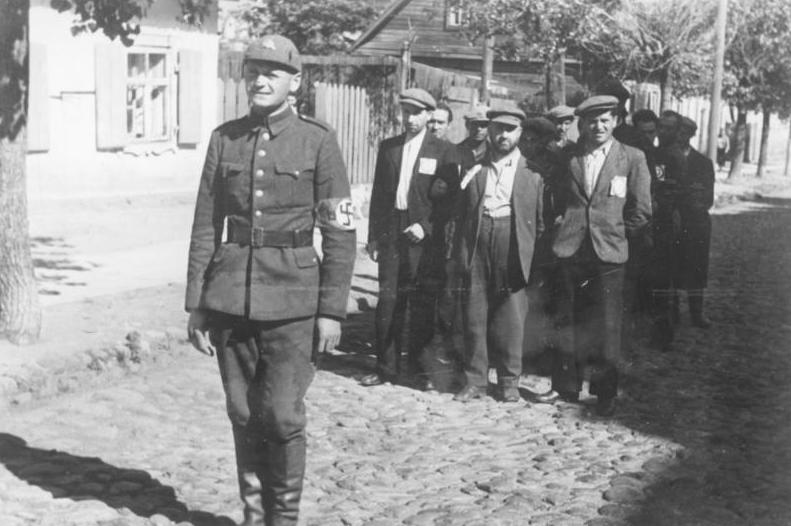
Lithuanian soldier escorting a group of Lithuanian Jews in Vilnius in July 1941

In June 1940, Lithuania was occupied by the Soviet Union. The Soviets introduced harsh sovietization policies, including nationalization of larger enterprises, landholdings, and real estate. Opponents of communism and the new regime were persecuted: an estimated 6,600 were imprisoned as "enemies of the people" and another 17,600 deported to Siberia. The Lithuanian Army was reorganized into the 29th Rifle Corps (179th Rifle and 184th Rifle Divisions) of the Red Army. More than 500 Lithuanian officers retired and 87 were imprisoned.

The Lithuanian Activist Front was formed in Berlin by Kazys Škirpa, former Lithuanian envoy to Germany. Its goal was to organize an anti-Soviet uprising in the event of a German-Soviet war. When Nazi Germany invaded Soviet Union on June 22, 1941, some Lithuanians greeted the Germans as liberators from the repressive Soviet rule. Many spontaneously joined the anti-Soviet June Uprising. The Provisional Government of Lithuania declared independence and Lithuanians began to form their own military and police units in hopes of recreating the Lithuanian Army. The territory of Lithuania was invaded by and divided between two German Army Groups: Army Group North took over western and northern Lithuania, and Army Group Centre took over most of the Vilnius Region. Therefore, developments in Kaunas and Vilnius were parallel but separate. The Germans had no intention of giving the Lithuanians independence, so the provisional government was dissolved on August 5, 1941 and partisan units disarmed. On September 26, the LAF was also dissolved and Lithuania was incorporated into the German civil administration.

== Formation ==
In the short period when the Lithuanians hoped to recover the Lithuanian state, they reconstituted part of the pre-war police, reaching about 40% (3,000 men) of its pre-war numbers, and began to rebuild the army. On July 5, however, German authorities forbade the reconstitution of the Lithuanian army, or any units other than self-defense units, which the Germans transformed into auxiliary police units. In November, all auxiliary policemen in the eastern territories, including Lithuania, were considered Schutzmannschaften.

Schutzmannschaften were divided into four types. The first was a regular police force, stationed in cities and provinces. The second type, closed formations, were organized into battalions, companies, platoons and groups. The third type was firefighting units. The fourth, auxiliary units grouped into platoons and companies, assisted regular police when needed.

The first battalion, known as the Tautinio darbo apsaugos batalionas (TDA), was formed by the Provisional Government in Kaunas on June 28. The Provisional Government was dissolved on August 5, 1941. The battalion was not dissolved and German Major Franz Lechthaler took over its command. On August 7, the TDA had 703 members and Lechthaler ordered it reorganized into two battalions of auxiliary police (German: Polizeihilfsdienst bataillone; Lithuanian: Pagalbinės policijos tarnyba or PPT). During August three more battalions of PPT were formed. In October, these five battalions were renamed security battalions (Lithuanian: apsaugos batalionas). In December, the five battalions were reorganized again into battalions of Schutzmannschaft.

Lithuanians massively deserted from the Soviet 29th Rifle Corps and gathered in Vilnius. They organized Lithuanian Self-defense Units (Lithuanian: Lietuvių savisaugos dalys or LSD) in Vilnius, Pabradė, Trakai, and Varėna. On July 21, 1941, LSD was reorganized into the Vilnius Reconstruction Service (Lithuanian: Vilniaus atstatymo tarnyba or VAT) with three units (Work, Order, and Security). On August 1, VAT and its three units were reorganized into three battalions of Schutzmannschaft. Two more battalions were organized by October 1941.

== Atrocities ==
Some Lithuanian auxiliary police battalions took an active part in the extermination of Jewish people in Lithuania, Belarus, Ukraine, Russia and Poland and committed crimes against the Polish and Belarusian populations. For example the 12th Police Battalion liquided Jews in Kaunas in October 1941 under the command of Antanas Impulevičius. Later that the TBD 12th battalion murdered the entire Jewish population of Slutsk in Belarus. The 2nd Police Battalion served as guards at the Majdanek death camp in occupied Poland. Of 26 Lithuanian Auxiliary Police battalions, 10 were directly involved in the destruction of Jewish people in Eastern Europe. According to German reports, Lithuanians committed 47,000 killings of Jews in Lithuania out of all 85,000 committed by Einsatzkommando there. They also killed 50,000 Belarusian Jews during the war. The largest crime against the non-Jewish civilian population by Lithuanian policemen was the killings of Polish people in the villages of Švenčionėliai and Švenčionys and their surroundings.

== List of Lithuanian Schutzmannschaft battalions ==
BN# (Note: Battalion number. Numbers 301 through 310 were assigned to the Lithuanian Territorial Defense Force.)	Formed from	Formation began	Formed in	First commander (Note: Only the first commander is listed. Some of them were acting commanders, holding the post for a few weeks.)	Holocaust (Note: Indicates whether the unit participated in the Holocaust. The conclusion is based on the research by Arūnas Bubnys.)	Location on 1942-08-26	Location on 1944-03-17	Date disbanded	Further fate
1st	VAT Security Unit (former LSD)	July 14, 1941	Vilnius	Col Lt Jonas Juknevičius	Yes	Vilnius	Vilnius	Fall 1944	To anti-aircraft units or Germany
2nd	VAT Order Unit (former LSD)	July 14, 1941	Vilnius	Col Lt Petras Vertelis	Yes	Lublin	Adutiškis	August 1944	To various German units
3rd	VAT Work unit (former LSD)	July 14, 1941	Vilnius	Capt Pranas Ambraziūnas	Yes	Near Minsk	Near Minsk	July 1944	To anti-aircraft units or Dresden
4th	4th battalion of PPT	August 30, 1941	Kaunas	Capt Viktoras Klimavičius	No	Stalino	disbanded	February 1944	Kovel Pocket: Soviet captivity
5th	5th battalion of PPT	August 28, 1941	Kaunas	Capt Juozas Kriščiūnas	No	Dedovichi	Švenčionėliai	December 1944	To the 256th and 13th battalions
6th	Railway Protection Battalion	July 1941	Vilnius	Capt Vincentas Ruseckas	No	Vilnius	Vilnius	August 1944	To anti-aircraft units or Germany
7th			Kaunas	Capt Klimavičius Viktoras	Yes	Lityn	disbanded	January 1944	To the 13th and 257th battalions
8th			Kaunas	Maj Juozas Jurkūnas	No	Kirovohrad	disbanded	Nov. 20, 1943	
9th			Kaunas	Capt Mykolas Slyvėnas	No	Kaunas	Kaunas	July 1944	To the 1st Lithuanian Police Regiment
10th	-	August 1941	Panevėžys	Capt Bronius Kairiūnas	Yes	Panevėžys	disbanded	January 21, 1943	To the 14th battalion
11th	3rd battalion of PPT	August 15, 1941	Kaunas	Capt Antanas Švilpa	Yes	Korosten	disbanded	Late 1943	
12th	2nd battalion of PPT (former TDA)	August 9, 1941	Kaunas	Maj Antanas Impulevičius	Extensively	Minsk	disbanded	February 1944	To the 15th battalion
13th	1st battalion of PPT (former TDA)	June 28, 1941	Kaunas	Maj Kazys Šimkus	Extensively	Dedovichi	Opochka	May 1945	Courland Pocket: Soviet captivity
14th	-	August 1941	Šiauliai	Capt Stanislovas Lipčius	Yes	Šiauliai	Šiauliai	Summer 1944	To Gdańsk and Dresden
15th	VAT Hrodna battalion	July 1941	Vilnius	Maj Albinas Levickis	No	Baranovichi	Near Minsk	July 26, 1944	To Szczecin and Gdańsk
250th	-	1941 autumn	Kaunas		No	Pskov	Daugavpils		
251st	-	Summer 1942	Kaunas		No	Kaunas	disbanded	February 1943	To the 2nd battalion
252nd	-	May 25, 1942	Kaunas	Maj Bronius Bajerčius	Yes	Kaunas	Lublin	November 1944	To northern Yugoslavia
253rd	-	May 1943	Kaunas	Capt Vladas Aižinas	No	n/a	Lublin	August 1944	To aviation units and Dresden
254th	-	Spring 1942	Vilnius	Capt Povilas Bareišis	No	Vilnius	disbanded	April 1944	To the 258th or 259th battalions
255th	-	July 21, 1942	Kaunas		No	Kaunas	Slutsk	August 1944	To Dresden
256th	-	March 1943	Kaunas	Capt Jonas Matulis	No	n/a	Panemunė	May 1945	Courland Pocket: Soviet captivity
257th	4 representative police companies	October 24, 1943		Capt V. Miliauskas	No	n/a	Svir	October 1944	To Gdańsk
258th	Training units	April 27, 1944			No	n/a	n/a	Late 1944	To Germany near Belgian border
259th	-	April 1944	Prienai		No	n/a	n/a		
Lietuva	Lithuanians in Reichsarbeitsdienst		Koszalin		No	n/a	n/a		

== See also ==
- Lithuanian Security Police

== Bibliography ==
=== Lithuanian-language sources ===
- Anušauskas, Arvydas; Bubnys, Arūnas; Kuodytė, Dialia; Jakubčionis, Algirdas; Titinis, Vytautas; Truska, Liudas, eds. (2005). Lietuva, 1940–1990 (in Lithuanian). Vilnius: Lietuvos gyventojų genocido ir rezistencijos tyrimo centras. ISBN 9986-757-65-7.
- Čekutis, Ričardas; Žygelis, Dalius (2010-04-14), Laisvės kyžkelės. Lietuvių policijos batalionai Antrojo pasaulinio karo metais (in Lithuanian), Bernardinai.lt
- Knezys, Stasys (2000). "Kauno karo komendantūros Tautinio darbo batalionas 1941 m." Genocidas ir Rezistencija (in Lithuanian). 7. ISSN 1392-3463.
- Rukšėnas, Alfredas (2007). "Kauno 2-asis pagalbinės policijos tarnybos batalionas ir gyventojų žudynės Baltarusijoje 1941–1943 m." Genocidas ir Rezistencija (in Lithuanian). 22. ISSN 1392-3463.
- Stankeras, Petras (2008). Lietuvių policija Antrajame pasauliniame kare (in Lithuanian). Mintis. ISBN 978-5-417-00958-7.
- Stoliarovas, Andriejus (2008a). Lietuvių pagalbinės policijos (apsaugos) 12-asis batalionas (Thesis) (in Lithuanian). Vytautas Magnus University.
- Stoliarovas, Andriejus (2008b). "Lietuvių pagalbinės policijos (apsaugos) 252-asis (Kauno) batalionas. Nežinomas bataliono istorijos fragmentas". Kauno istorijos metraštis. 9. ISSN 1822-2617.
- Zizas, Rimantas (2004). "Lietuvių savisaugos (apsaugos) bataliono karių nuostoliai Vokietijos-SSRS karo metu (1941-1945)". Karo Archyvas (in Lithuanian). 19. ISSN 1392-6489.

==== Laimutė Breslavskienė ====
- Breslavskienė, Laimutė (August 2010a). "Pažyma apie 259-ojo lietuvių policijos mokomojo bataliono fondą Nr. R-670" (in Lithuanian). Lietuvos centrinis valstybės archyvas. Archived from the original on 2015-04-19.
- Breslavskienė, Laimutė (August 2010b). "Pažyma apie 255-ojo lietuvių policijos bataliono fondą Nr. R-677" (in Lithuanian). Lietuvos centrinis valstybės archyvas. Archived from the original on 2015-04-19.
- Breslavskienė, Laimutė (September 2010a). "Pažyma apie 258-ojo lietuvių policijos bataliono fondą Nr. R-669" (in Lithuanian). Lietuvos centrinis valstybės archyvas. Archived from the original on 2015-04-19.
- Breslavskienė, Laimutė (September 2010b). "Pažyma apie 257-ojo lietuvių policijos bataliono fondą Nr. R-668" (in Lithuanian). Lietuvos centrinis valstybės archyvas. Archived from the original on 2015-04-19.
- Breslavskienė, Laimutė (September 2010c). "Pažyma apie 6-ojo lietuvių policijos bataliono fondą Nr. R-664" (in Lithuanian). Lietuvos centrinis valstybės archyvas. Archived from the original on 2015-04-19.

==== Arūnas Bubnys ====
- Bubnys, Arūnas (1998a). "Lietuvių viešoji policija ir policijos batalionai (1941–1944)". Genocidas ir Rezistencija (in Lithuanian). 3. ISSN 1392-3463.
- Bubnys, Arūnas (1998b). "253-iasis lietuvių policijos batalionas (1943–1944)". Genocidas ir Rezistencija (in Lithuanian). 4. ISSN 1392-3463.
- Bubnys, Arūnas (1998c). Vokiečių okupuota Lietuva (1941–1944) (in Lithuanian). Vilnius: Lietuvos gyventojų genocido ir rezistencijos tyrimo centras. ISBN 9986-757-12-6.
- Bubnys, Arūnas (2000). "Lietuvių policijos 2-asis (Vilniaus) ir 252-asis batalionai (1941–1944)". Genocidas ir Rezistencija (in Lithuanian). 8. ISSN 1392-3463.
- Bubnys, Arūnas (2001a). "Penktasis lietuvių policijos batalionas (1941–1944)". Genocidas ir Rezistencija (in Lithuanian). 9. ISSN 1392-3463.
- Bubnys, Arūnas (2001b). "Lietuvių policijos batalionai Pskovo srityje ir Kurše: 13-asis ir 10(256)-asis batalionai (1942–1945)". Genocidas ir Rezistencija (in Lithuanian). 10. ISSN 1392-3463.
- Bubnys, Arūnas (2001c). "Atsakymas ponui H. Kudreikiui". Genocidas ir Rezistencija (in Lithuanian). 10. ISSN 1392-3463.
- Bubnys, Arūnas (2006). "Lietuvių policijos 1 (13)-asis batalionas ir žydų žudynės 1941 m." Genocidas ir Rezistencija (in Lithuanian). 20. ISSN 1392-3463.
- Bubnys, Arūnas (2007). "Lietuvių policijos 15-asis batalionas. (1941-1944 m.)". Genocidas ir Rezistencija (in Lithuanian). 21. ISSN 1392-3463.
- Bubnys, Arūnas (2008a). "Lietuvių policijos 3(11)-iasis batalionas". Genocidas ir Rezistencija (in Lithuanian). 23. ISSN 1392-3463.
- Bubnys, Arūnas (2008b). "Lietuvių savisaugos dalinių Vilniaus apygardos batalionai (1941-1944 m.)". Genocidas ir Rezistencija (in Lithuanian). 24. ISSN 1392-3463.
- Bubnys, Arūnas (2009-10-17). "Lietuvių policijos batalionų nuginklavimas ir išformavimas Rytprūsiuose 1944 metais" (PDF). Voruta. 20 (686): 6, 8. ISSN 2029-3534.
- Bubnys, Arūnas (2010). "Lietuvių policijos Šiaulių (14-asis) ir Panevėžio (10-asis) batalionai (1941-1944)". Genocidas ir Rezistencija (in Lithuanian). 27. ISSN 1392-3463.
- Bubnys, Arūnas (2013). "Lietuvių policijos Vilniaus 4-asis batalionas (1941-1944)". Voruta (in Lithuanian). 17–18 (781–782). ISSN 1392-0677.

=== English-language sources ===
- Bubnys, Arūnas (2017). "The Lithuanian Schutzmannschaft Battalions". In Böhler, Jochen; Gerwarth, Robert (eds.). The Waffen-SS. A European History. Oxford. ISBN 978-0-19-879055-6.
- Caballero, Jurado (2002). Windrow, Martin (ed.). Germany's Eastern Front Allies (2). Men-at-Arms. Great Britain: Osprey Publishing.
- Yitzhak Arad (1990). The Encyclopedia of the Holocaust. New York City: Macmillan Publishers. ISBN 9780028960906.
- Mollo, Andrew (1992). Uniforms of the SS. Vol. 5 - Sicherheitsdienst und Sicherheitspolizei 1931-1945. Great Britain: Windrow & Greene. ISBN 1-872004-62-8.
- Statiev, Alexander (2010). The Soviet Counterinsurgency in the Western Borderlands. Cambridge: 978-0-521-76833-7.
- Suziedelis, Saulius A. (2011). Historical Dictionary of Lithuania. Scarecrow Press. ISBN 9780810875364.
