= 259th Lithuanian Police Battalion =

- Lithuanian: 259-asis lietuvių policijos batalionas
- Active: April–July 1944
- Country: German-occupied Lithuania
- Allegiance: Nazi Germany
- Branch: Ordnungspolizei
- Type: Auxiliary police

Commanders
- First and only commander: Captain Albinas Lastas

259th Lithuanian Police Battalion (German: Litauische Polizei-Ausbildungs-Bataillon Nr. 259, lit. '259th Lithuanian Police Training Battalion'; Lithuanian: 259-asis lietuvių policijos batalionas) was a Lithuanian auxiliary police battalion formed in April 1944 in Prienai. It was soon disbanded in July of that same year in Tilsit. The battalion was formed from the soldiers sent by the Training Unit (Mokomoji dalis) and the 3rd Lithuanian Construction Battalion. The 259th Battalion was the last Lithuanian Police Battalion to be formed.

The battalion was subordinated to the Ordnungspolizei leader under the SS- und Polizeiführer in Lithuania. However, the battalion's staffing, enforcing of discipline and economic affairs were taken care of by the Lithuanian Auxiliary Police liaison officer's headquarters under the Ordungspolizei leader in Lithuania.

== History ==
The battalion was stationed in Prienai between 18 April and 11 July 1944, and was then moved to Kaunas. In Prienai, the soldiers lived in the barracks, were trained and introduced to weapons.

On June 20, two platoons each from the 1st and 2nd companies fought against Soviet partisans near the Pagaršvys village in the Prienai parish. The operation was led by lieutenant Balys Lukošius. Upon receiving information from a farmer about the whereabouts of the partisans, the companies hurriedly prepared to march. The policemen were armed with a machine gun and French rifles. The partisan bunker was encircled. After noticing the approaching policemen, the partisans opened fire. Later, as the partisans emerged from their bunker, they attempted to escape into the forest, located about 300 metres away. In the bunker, the policemen found two killed partisans, two submachine guns and grenades in the bunker. The Lithuanian casualties of this fight were the 1st company's junior non-commissioned officer (j. psk.) Jonas Chmieliauskas and private Petras Umbrasas. Private Juozas Skinkys was wounded in the head and was taken to the German military hospital in Kaunas.

During May and June, desertion rates became massive. About thirty policemen deserted from the battalion until the beginning of June. In the first half of July, the battalion was transferred to Kaunas.

It is known from the orders of the battalion's commander that the battalion, or at least its headquarters, were in Kaunas from July 13 to 25. As of April 25, the battalion had four companies and a pioneer platoon.

The Battalion's composition on April 25
Subdivision	Total of people
2nd Company	140
3rd Company	142
4th Company	135
Pioneer platoon	33

The soldiers guarded the railway bridge over Nemunas, the meat factory, other companies and barracks located there. At the end of the month, the battalion retreated to Tilsit. Along the way, many soldiers left the unit, preferring to remain in Lithuania. Soon, the battalion was disbanded in Tilsit.

== Aftermath ==
Some of the battalion's troops were sent to Oldenburg and later Vienna, to work at the airports. They reached the end of the war in Austria, where they were taken prisoner by the United States Army.

== Commanders ==
The battalion's commander was captain Albinas Lastas. On April 25, junior lieutenant Benjaminas Paulionis, who was the 4th company's commander, was temporarily acting as the battalion's adjutant commander. It is known that captain Balys Matulevičius served in the battalion, but his position is unknown.

=== 1st company ===
The 1st company's commander from April 25th was lieutenant Balys Lukošius. From May 2, it was junior lieutenant Antanas Gelažėla. In July, the company commander was Lieutenant Albinas Sidaravičius.

=== 3rd company ===
On April 6, lieutenant Antanas Baltrušis, from the 9th Battalion, was appointed the 3rd company's commander, replacing the previous commander, lieutenant Aleksas Grinius, who was sent to the 9th Battalion. From April 18, the 3rd company's commander was junior lieutenant Kostas Eidukonis.

=== 4th company ===
As of April 25, the 4th company's commander was junior lieutenant Benjaminas Paulionis. The 3rd company's commander Eidukonis was also temporarily the 4th company's acting commander on July 8.

=== Pioneer platoon ===
Lieutenant Jonas Kupstas, transferred from the Training Unit, was made the pioneer platoon's commander on May 5, but just two days later he was sent to the Police Battalion "Lietuva". The pioneer platoon's new commander was junior lieutenant Benediktas Laibėnas.

== Bibliography ==
- Breslavskienė, Laimutė (August 2010). "Pažyma apie 259-ojo lietuvių policijos mokomojo bataliono fondą Nr. R-670" (in Lithuanian). Lietuvos centrinis valstybės archyvas. Archived from the original on 2015-04-19.
- Bubnys, Arūnas (17 October 2009). "Lietuvių policijos batalionų nuginklavimas ir išformavimas Rytprūsiuose 1944 metais" (PDF). Voruta (in Lithuanian). 20 (686). ISSN 1392-0677.
- Bubnys, Arūnas (2017). Lietuvių policijos batalionai 1941-1945 m. (in Lithuanian). Vilnius: Lietuvos gyventojų genocido ir rezistencijos tyrimo centras. ISBN 978-609-8037-68-5.
