= 10th Lithuanian Police Battalion =

- Lithuanian: 10-asis lietuvių policijos batalionas
- Active: 1941 August–1943 January 31
- Country: German-occupied Lithuania
- Allegiance: Nazi Germany
- Branch: Ordnungspolizei
- Type: Infantry
- Size: 280-300 (August 1941)

10th Lithuanian Police Battalion (German: Litauische Schutzmannschaft–F–Bataillon Nr. 10; Lithuanian: 10-asis lietuvių policijos batalionas, lit. '10th Lithuanian Police Battalion') was a Lithuanian auxiliary police battalion first formed in August 1941 and disbanded on 31 January 1943. The original 10th Battalion is known to have partaken in the Holocaust. A new battalion with the same name was formed after a few months and was renumbered as 256th Lithuanian Police Battalion.

== History ==
The 10th Lithuanian Police Battalion was formed in Panevėžys in August 1941. The battalion had a total strength of 280 to 300 men, with three companies each of 80-90 men. It was disbanded on 31 January 1943 and its men absorbed by the 14th Lithuanian Police Battalion. The 10th Battalion took part in the Holocaust.

== Sources ==
- Bubnys, Arūnas (2017). Lietuvių policijos batalionai 1941-1945 m. Vilnius: Lietuvos gyventojų genocido ir rezistencijos tyrimo centras. ISBN 978-609-8037-68-5.
