= Dauniškis =

Lake in Utena, Lithuania

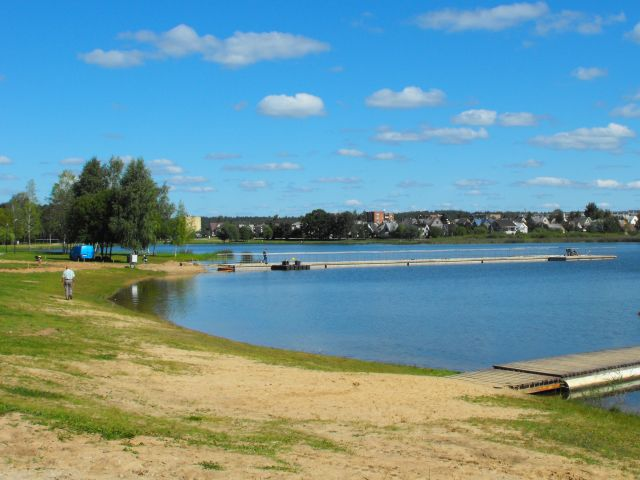

- Location within Lithuania
- Coordinates: 55°30′15″N 25°36′19″E
- Primary outflows: Unnamed rivulet (Vyžuona River basin)
- Basin countries: Lithuania
- Max. length: 0.7 km (0.43 mi)
- Max. width: 0.3 km (0.19 mi)
- Surface area: 16 ha (40 acres)

Dauniškis is a lake located in Dauniškis Park, Utena, Lithuania. It has a length of 0.7 km and maximum width of 0.3 km.
