= Antanas Impulevičius =

Officer Lithuanian Army and Nazi collaborator (1907–1970)

Antanas Impulevičius-Impulėnas
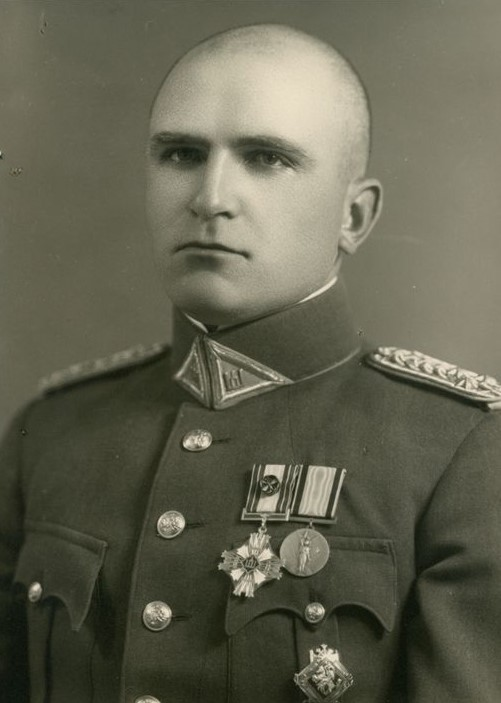
- Born: January 28, 1907; Panevėžys, Russian Empire
- Died: 4 December 1970 (aged 63); Philadelphia, Pennsylvania, United States
- Occupation: Army officer
- Awards: Order of the Lithuanian Grand Duke Gediminas

Antanas Impulevičius-Impulėnas (a.k.a. Antanas Impulionis, January 28, 1907 – December 4, 1970) was an officer of the Lithuanian Army, reaching the rank of major in 1940, and later a Nazi collaborator. After the occupation of Lithuania by the Soviet Union, he was arrested by NKVD. He was freed during the Uprising of June 1941. Impulevičius joined the Lithuanian Schutzmannschaft and commanded the 12th Police Battalion. His unit was sent to Belarus where it participated in mass executions of the Jews, particularly in Minsk and Kletsk. He also joined the short-lived Lithuanian Territorial Defense Force. In 1944, he moved to Germany, and in 1949 he relocated to the United States. In 1962, the Supreme Court of the Lithuanian SSR sentenced him to death in absentia. After the trial, the United States dismissed a Soviet request to extradite him.
