= Walloon Guard =

German military unit

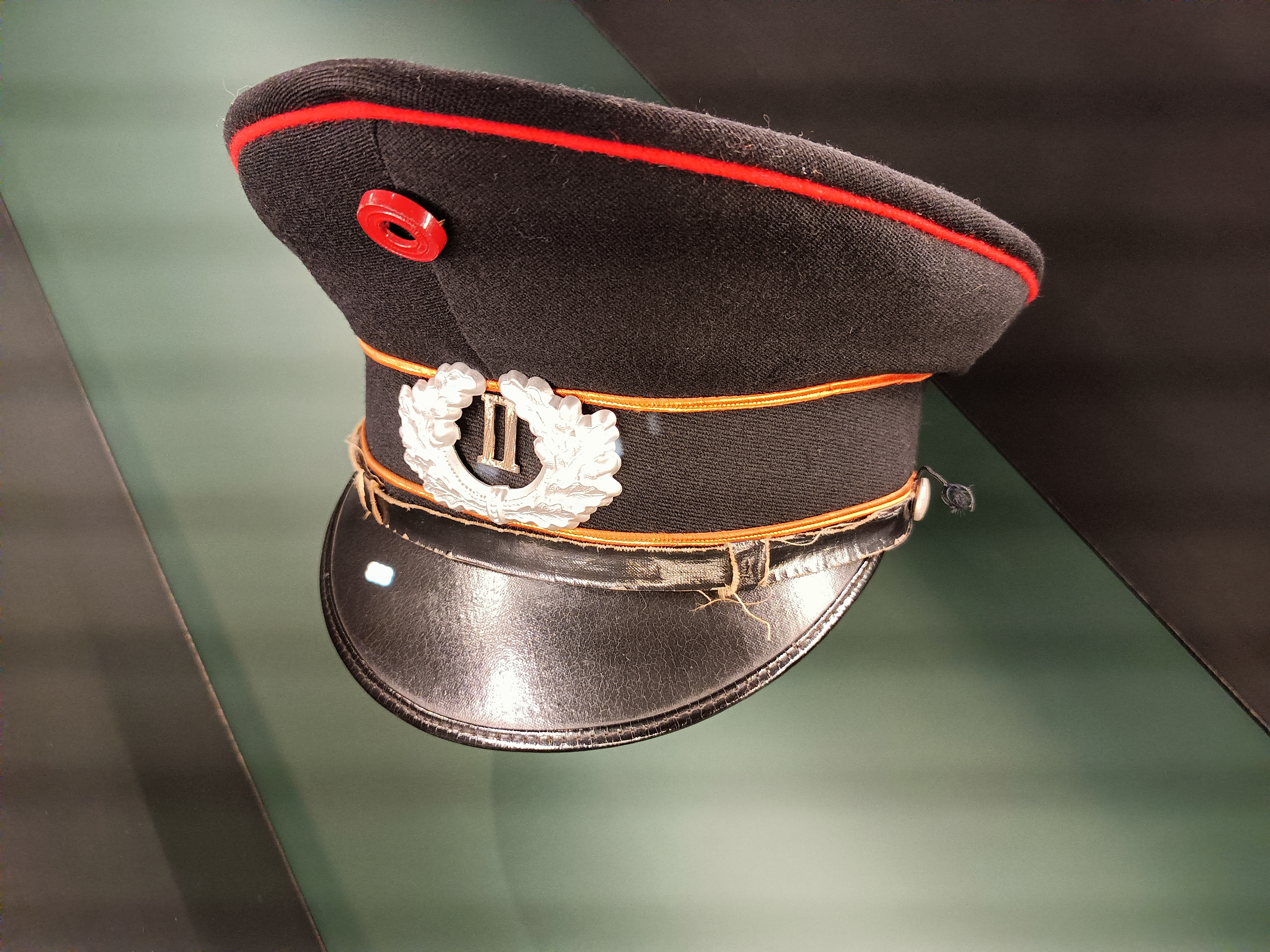
Peaked cap worn by an officer of the Walloon Guard, in the collection of Mons Memorial Museum

The Walloon Guard (French: Garde Wallonne) was a collaborationist paramilitary formation which served as an auxiliary police in German-occupied Belgium and parts of Northern France during World War II.

The Walloon Guard was established in November 1941 with the support of the Rexist Party and was officially incorporated into the German Army (Wehrmacht) alongside the Feldgendarmerie. In contrast to the Walloon Legion, established in June 1941, which participated in fighting on the Eastern Front the Walloon Guard was used within Belgium and initially found it easier to attract volunteers because of the comparatively high salaries offered. Although notionally recruited from the general population and former soldiers of the Belgian army, the majority of its personnel were Rexist members. A German liaison officer was attached to each company.

The first battalion was raised on 17 November 1941. It was used primarily for guarding railways and military installations but also participated in the repression of the resistance and deserters from labour deportation. Its personnel were armed. Historian Flore Plisnier notes that "violence became endemic within the formation, ruining its reputation vis-a-vis other pro-German organisations". Particularly notable was the so-called Bande Jayé (lit. 'Jayé gang'), named after its leader, Marcel Jayé, which became indistinguishable from German units and terrorised the civilian population in parts of the Borinage.

The Walloon Guard was a loose counterpart of the Flemish Guard (Vlaamsche Wacht) formed in May 1941. The two formations wore near-identical uniforms.

== Bibliography ==
- Littlejohn, David (1972). The Patriotic Traitors: A History of Collaboration in German-Occupied Europe, 1940-45. London: Heinemann. OCLC 463008186.
- Plisnier, Flore (2011). Ils ont pris les armes pour Hitler: la collaboration armée en Belgique francophone. Brussels: Renaissance du Livre. ISBN 9782507003616.
