= Utena, Lithuania =

Utena
- City
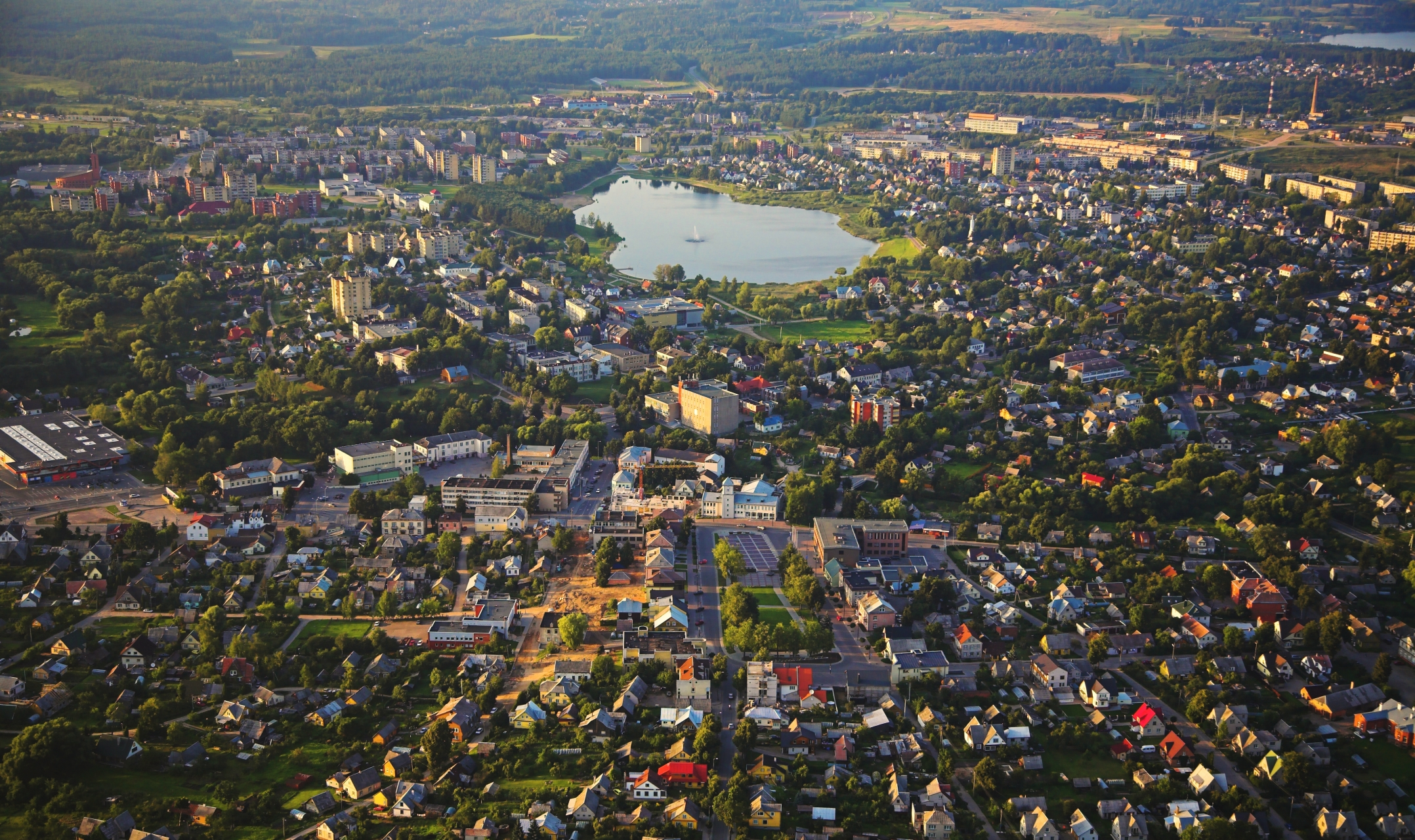
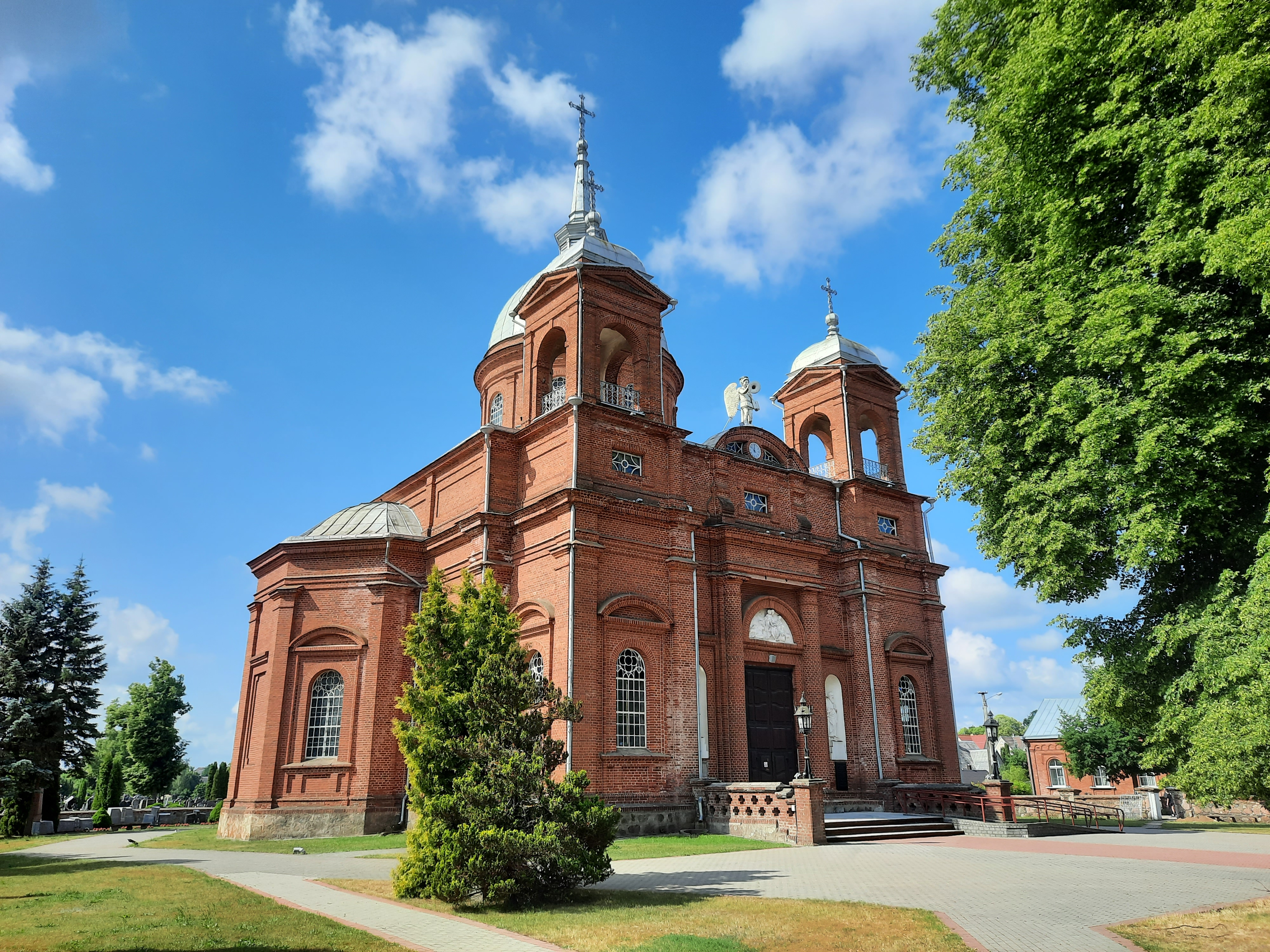
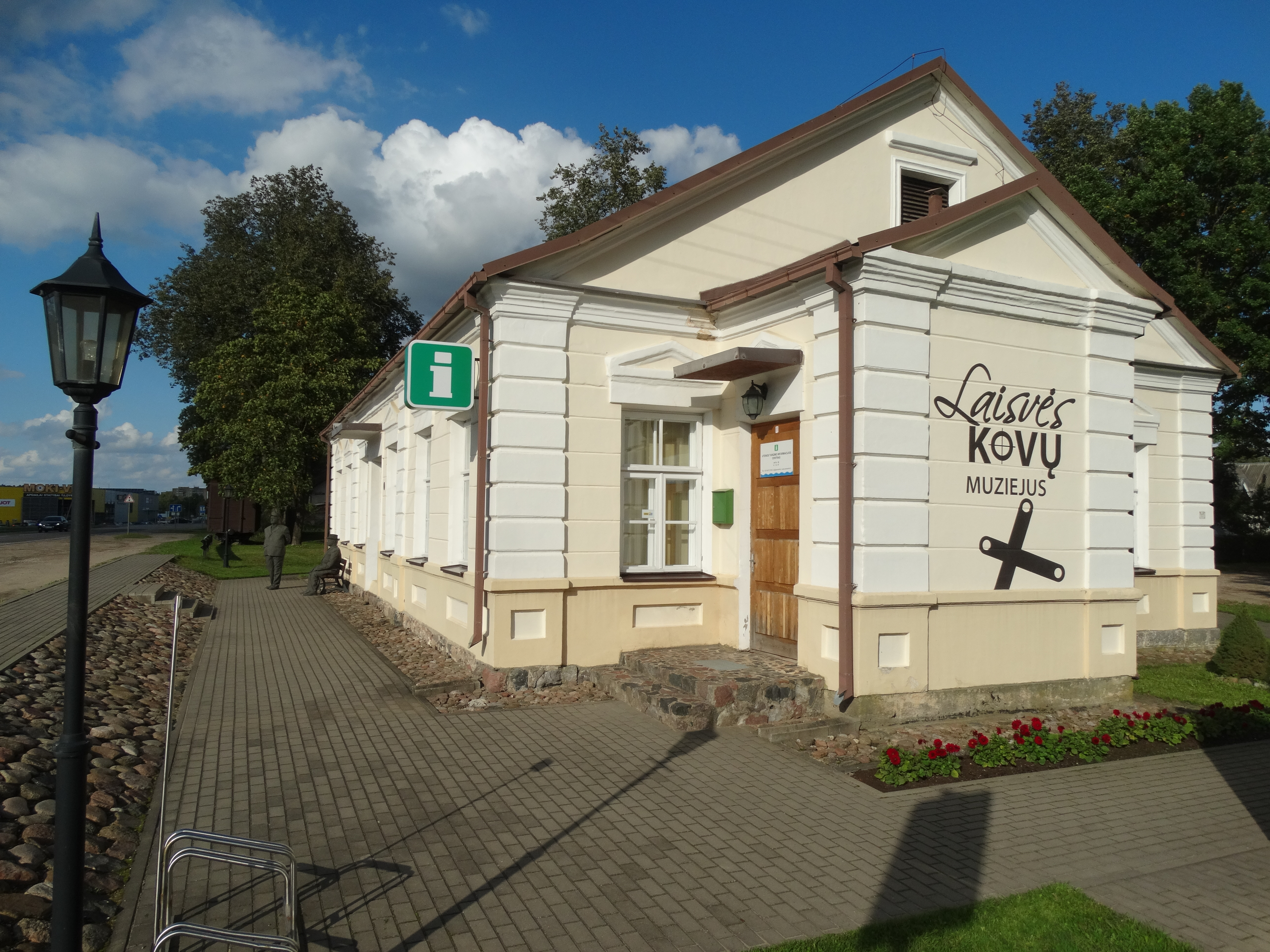
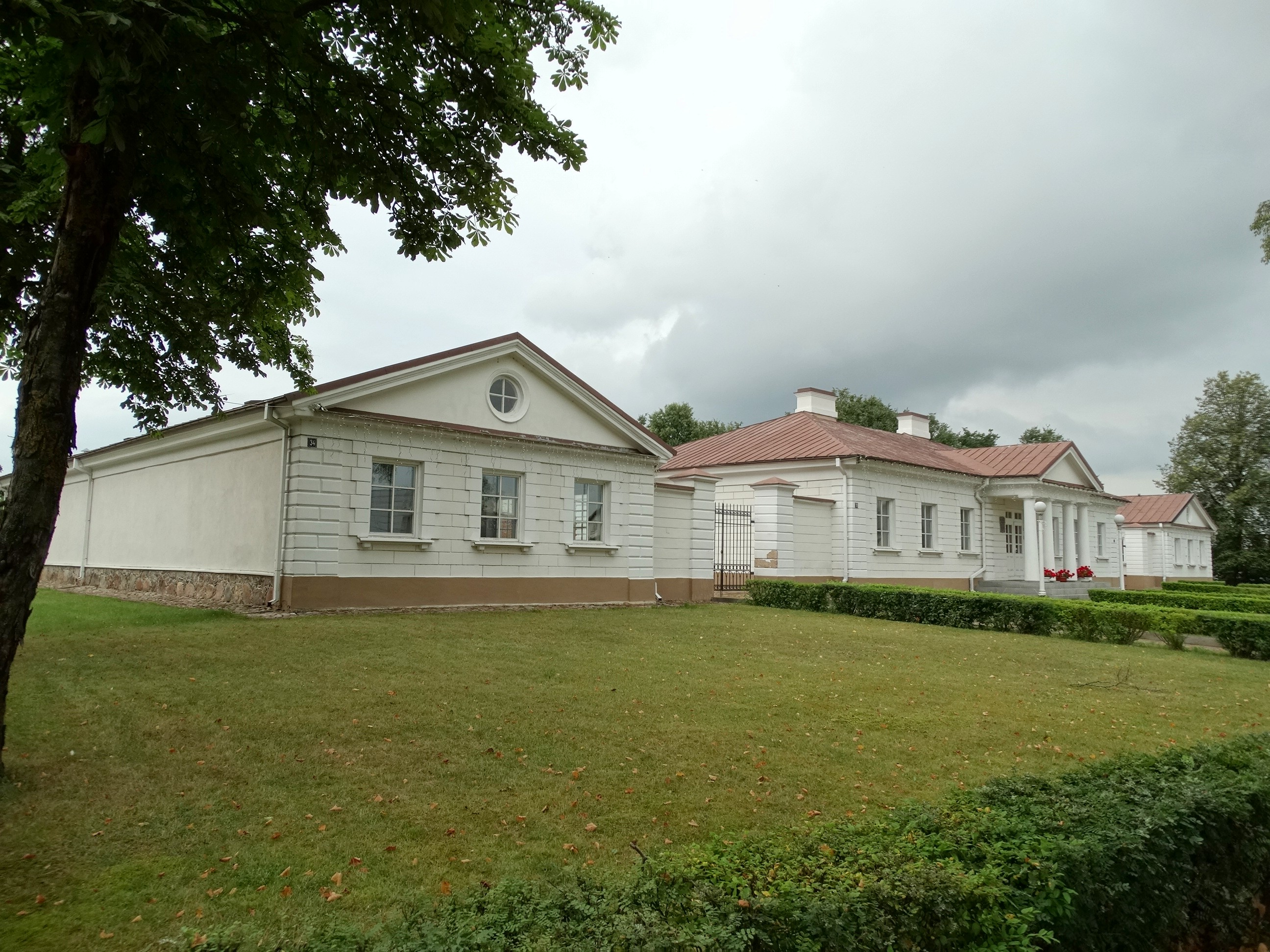
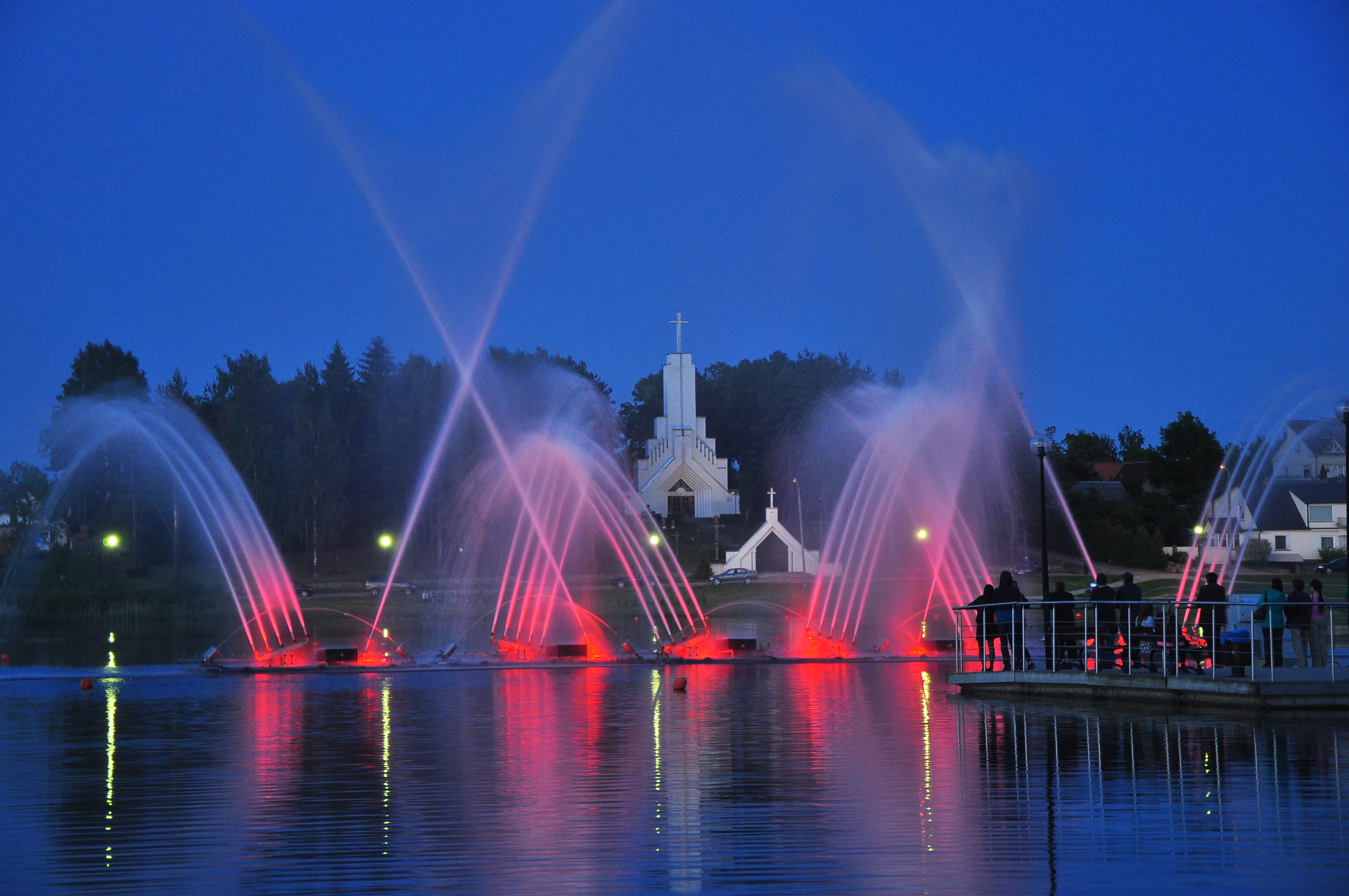
- Aerial view of Utena Church of the Ascension of Christ Church of the Providence of God Museum of Freedom Fights at the former railway station Department of Visual Arts of the Utena Art School Musical fountains at Lake Dauniškis and memorial for the Lithuanian partisans in the background at center

- Flag Coat of arms

- Location of Utena in Lithuania Location of Utena within the Baltics Location of Utena in Europe
- Coordinates: 55°30′N 25°36′E
- Country: Lithuania
- Ethnographic region: Aukštaitija
- County: Utena County
- Municipality: Utena district municipality
- Eldership: Utena town eldership
- Capital of: Utena district municipality Utena town eldership Utena rural eldership
- First mentioned: 1261
- Granted city rights: 1599

Government
  - Mayor: Marijus Kaukėnas

Area
  - City: 15.3 km^{2} (5.9 sq mi)
- Elevation: 113 m (371 ft)

Population (2020)
  - City: 25,397
  - Density: 1,660/km^{2} (4,300/sq mi)
  - Metro: 48,378
- Demonym(s): Utenian(s) (English) uteniškiai (Lithuanian)
- Time zone: UTC+2 (EET)
  - Summer (DST): UTC+3 (EEST)
- Postal code: 28xxx
- Area code: (+370) 389
- Website: utena.lt

Utena is a city in north-east Lithuania. It is the administrative center of Utena district and Utena County. Utena is one of the oldest settlements of Lithuania. The name of the city is most probably derived from a hydronym. The name of the settlement has been known since 1261.

Utena is an industrial city. It is known for its clothing, food and beverage factories. In recent years, however, streets, public squares and large areas of the parks in the city were reconstructed and Utena is now more attractive for recreation and tourism.

The anniversary of Utena City had been held each year on the last weekend of September. Since 2013 the anniversary has been held on the first weekend of September to take advantage of better weather conditions.

== History ==
Utena was the location of one of many Roman Catholic churches where the priests had to know the Lithuanian language according to the Grand Duke of Lithuania Alexander Jagiellon in 1501

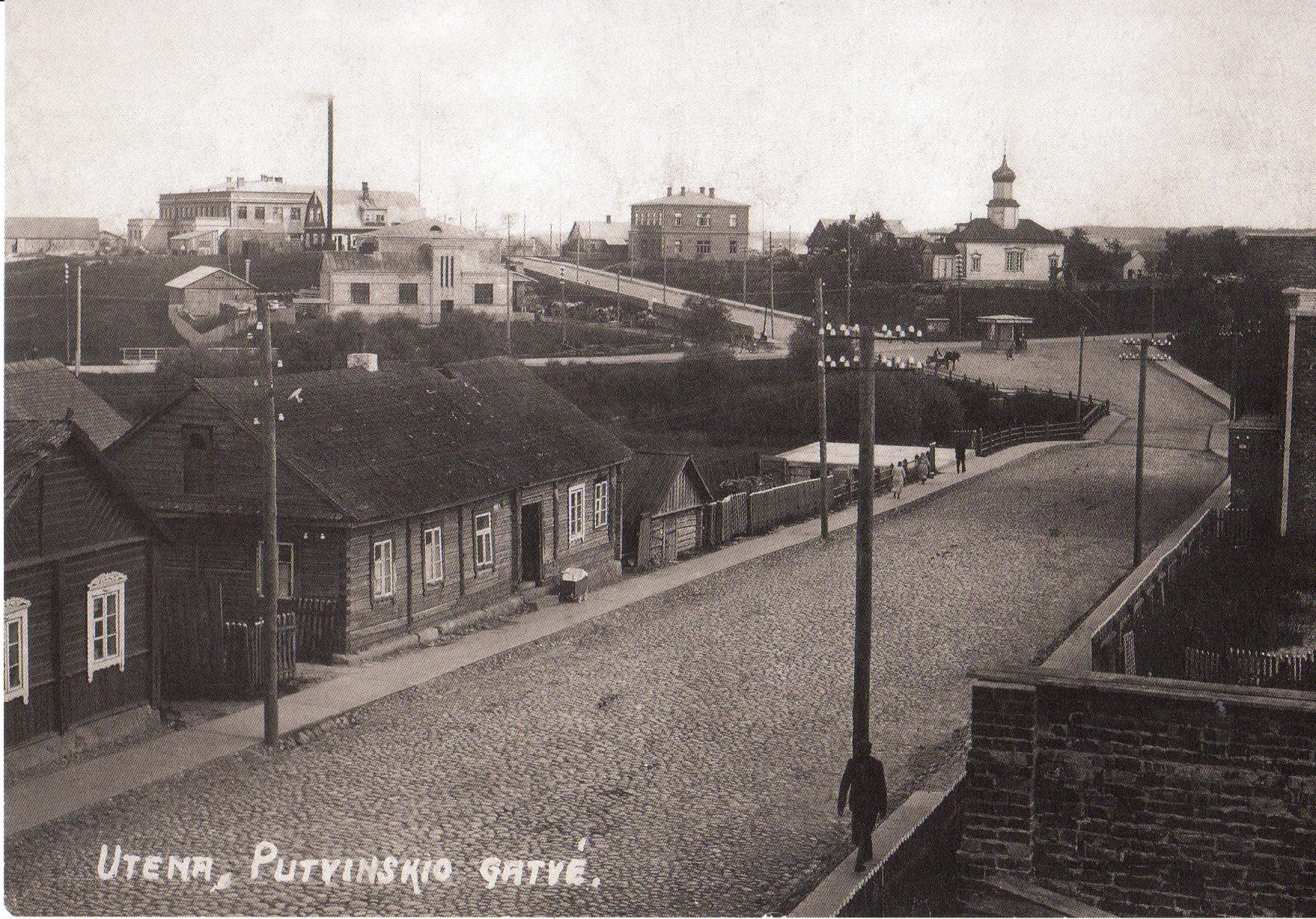
Utena, circa 1930

Utena was first mentioned in historical documents dating back to 1261. The settlement was a major center of Nalšia. It was part of the Grand Duchy of Lithuania until 1795, when it fell under the Russian Empire rule. From 1802 it belonged to the Vilna Governorate until 1843 when it became a part of the Kovno Governorate. The town grew rapidly after the St.Petersburg-Warsaw road was constructed between 1830 and 1835. In 1835–1836, the Utena Postage Station for horse post with lodging houses and stables was constructed, which was used or passed by the Russian tsars, French writer Honoré de Balzac, Russian painter Ilya Repin, Lithuanian poet Antanas Baranauskas, Lithuanian national movement figure Jonas Basanavičius, etc. In 1899 a narrow gauge railway line, connecting Panevėžys-Utena-Švenčionys, was constructed. At the end of the 19th century two big fires devastated the town.

Germany occupied Utena from 1915 to 1918, until the Soviet Bolsheviks took over. Following the defeat of Soviets, in June 1919, Utena became a district center in independent Lithuania.

Utena, known as the shtetl Utyan in Yiddish, historically had a Jewish population. In 1941, approximately 2,000 Jews were rounded up in the town, which was then under the Nazi occupation, and shot in the Rašė Forest about 2 km (1.2 mi) to the north.

== Demography ==
=== Population ===
According to the 2021 census, the city population was 25,343 people, of which:

- Lithuanians – 95.61% (24,232)
- Russians – 2.20% (558)
- Poles – 0.63% (160)
- Ukrainians – 0.17% (42)
- Belarusians – 0.15% (37)
- Others / did not specify – 1.26% (320)

Historical population

Year	Pop.	±% p.a.
1939	6,276	—
1959	7,066	+0.59%
1979	23,461	+6.18%
1989	34,430	+3.91%
1999	36,100	+0.47%
2005	33,086	−1.44%

Year	Pop.	±% p.a.
2006	32,881	−0.62%
2007	32,789	−0.28%
2008	32,572	−0.66%
2009	32,476	−0.29%
2010	31,940	−1.65%

== Geography ==
Utena is located in northeastern Lithuania. The city covers 15.1 km^{2} and is the eighth-largest city by area in Lithuania. Four rivers cross the city territory: Vyžuona, Krašuona, Vieša and Utenėlė. There are also two lakes in Utena, Dauniškis and Vyžuonaitis.

=== Districts ===
The city is divided into 10 districts:

- Aukštakalnis
- Ąžuolija
- Centras (Center)
- Dauniškis
- Pramonės rajonas (Industrial district)
- Rašė
- Vyturiai
- Šilinė
- Grybeliai
- Krašuona

=== Parks and gardens ===
- City Garden
- Vyžuona Park
- Dauniškis Park
- Krašuona Park
- Aukštakalnis Pine Forest
- Rašė Park
- Utenėlė Park
- Vieša Park
- Monkey park

=== Climate ===
Under the Köppen climate classification, Utena has a humid continental climate (Dfb). The lowest temperature ever recorded in Lithuania occurred in Utena: −42.9 °C (−45.2 °F) on 1 February 1956.

Climate data for Utena (1991−2020 normals, extremes 1925−1990)
Month	Jan	Feb	Mar	Apr	May	Jun	Jul	Aug	Sep	Oct	Nov	Dec	Year
Record high °C (°F)	7.7 (45.9)	13.3 (55.9)	19.5 (67.1)	26.8 (80.2)	30.8 (87.4)	31.7 (89.1)	34.4 (93.9)	32.0 (89.6)	28.4 (83.1)	23.4 (74.1)	15.9 (60.6)	10.5 (50.9)	34.4 (93.9)
Mean daily maximum °C (°F)	−1.1 (30.0)	−0.2 (31.6)	4.7 (40.5)	12.8 (55.0)	18.6 (65.5)	21.9 (71.4)	24.1 (75.4)	23.1 (73.6)	17.5 (63.5)	10.6 (51.1)	4.3 (39.7)	0.4 (32.7)	11.4 (52.5)
Daily mean °C (°F)	−3.5 (25.7)	−3.2 (26.2)	0.6 (33.1)	7.1 (44.8)	12.5 (54.5)	16.0 (60.8)	18.3 (64.9)	17.1 (62.8)	12.2 (54.0)	6.8 (44.2)	2.1 (35.8)	−1.6 (29.1)	7.0 (44.6)
Mean daily minimum °C (°F)	−6.0 (21.2)	−6.1 (21.0)	−3.2 (26.2)	1.8 (35.2)	6.4 (43.5)	10.1 (50.2)	12.6 (54.7)	11.7 (53.1)	7.8 (46.0)	3.6 (38.5)	0.0 (32.0)	−3.8 (25.2)	2.9 (37.2)
Record low °C (°F)	−38.9 (−38.0)	−42.9 (−45.2)	−33.7 (−28.7)	−17.6 (0.3)	−4.6 (23.7)	−1.5 (29.3)	3.7 (38.7)	−0.1 (31.8)	−5.2 (22.6)	−13.2 (8.2)	−20.0 (−4.0)	−31.3 (−24.3)	−42.9 (−45.2)
Average precipitation mm (inches)	47 (1.9)	41 (1.6)	38 (1.5)	39 (1.5)	58 (2.3)	74 (2.9)	77 (3.0)	84 (3.3)	58 (2.3)	63 (2.5)	50 (2.0)	49 (1.9)	678 (26.7)
Average relative humidity (%)	85	83	77	69	69	72	74	76	80	83	87	87	78
Mean monthly sunshine hours	35.6	63.3	137.0	196.6	265.4	269.6	270.7	243.0	162.3	92.8	30.6	24.6	1,791.4
Source 1: Lithuanian Hydrometeorological Service
Source 2: NOAA (extremes)

== Sport ==
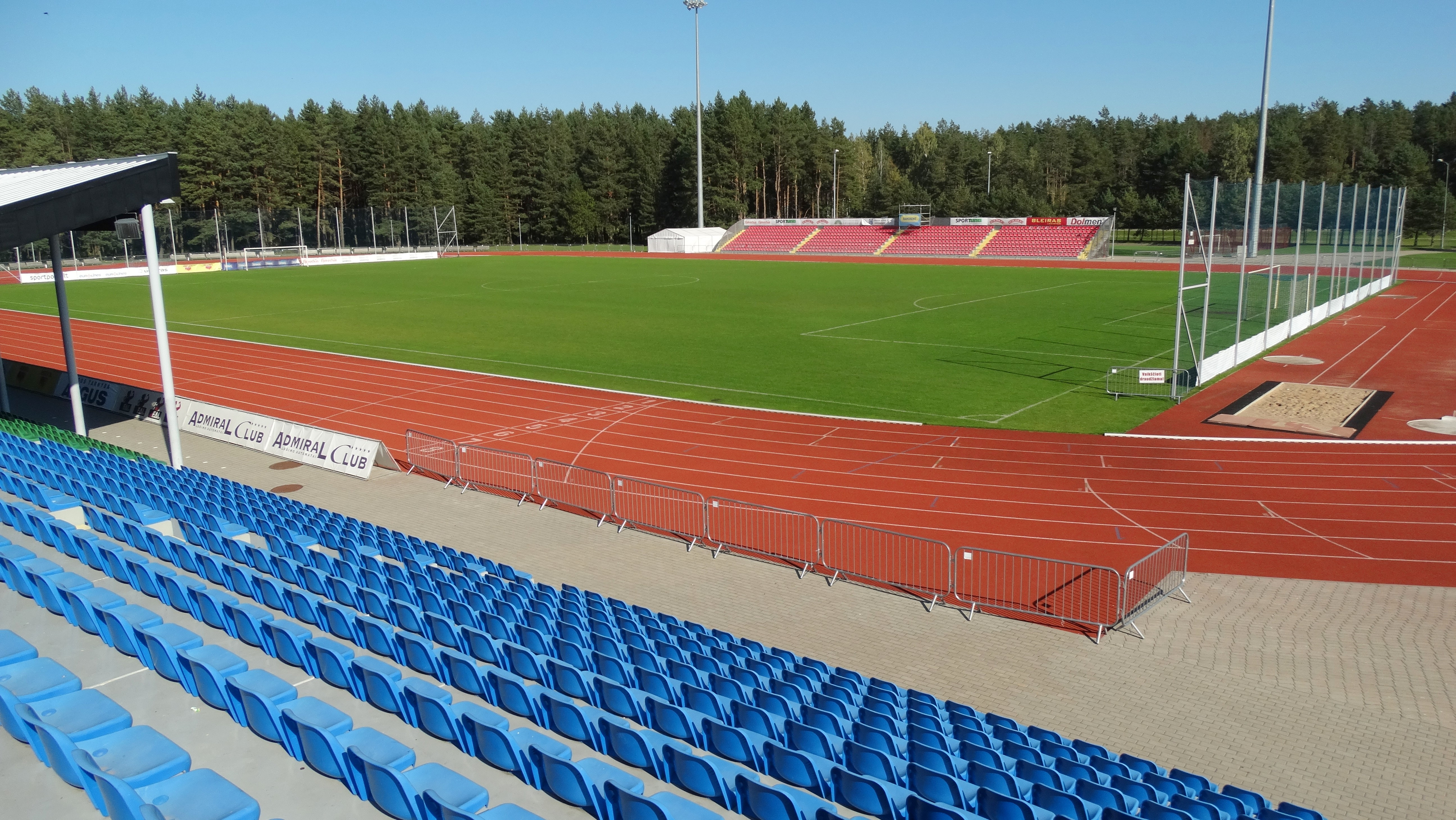
Stadium of the FK Utenis Utena

FK Utenis Utena plays in A Lyga and BC Juventus plays in LKL.

Hometown of Jonas Valančiūnas of the Denver Nuggets.

Aidenas Malašinskas is the best handball player in Lithuania (2019, 2021).

== Twin towns – sister cities ==
Utena is twinned with:

- Chełm, Poland
- Kovel, Ukraine
- Lidköping, Sweden
- Pontinia, Italy
- Preiļi, Latvia
- Rēzekne, Latvia
- Třeboň, Czech Republic
- Beit Sahour, Palestine

== Gallery ==
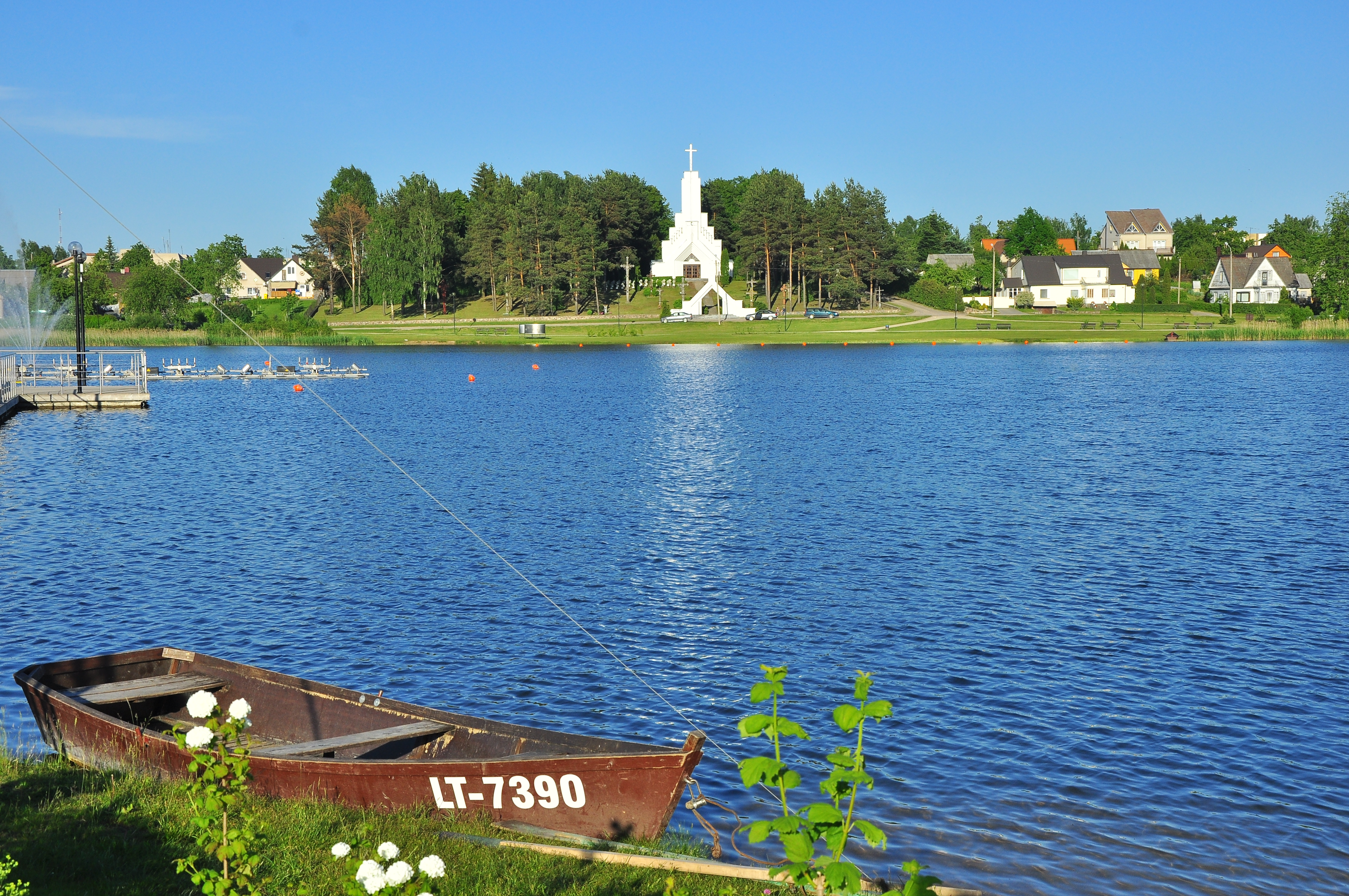
Dauniškis Lake, 2015

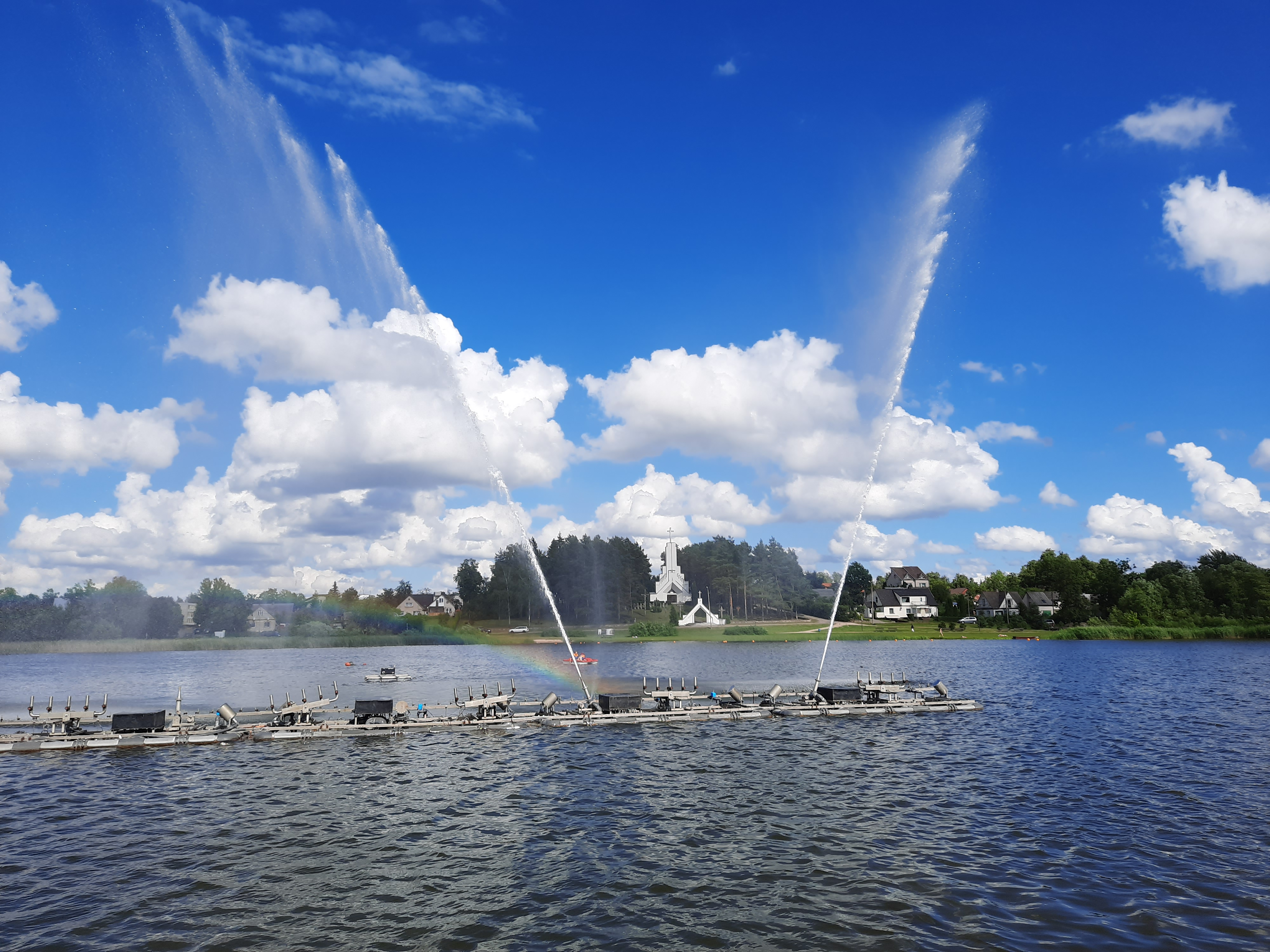
Lake Dauniškis, 2020

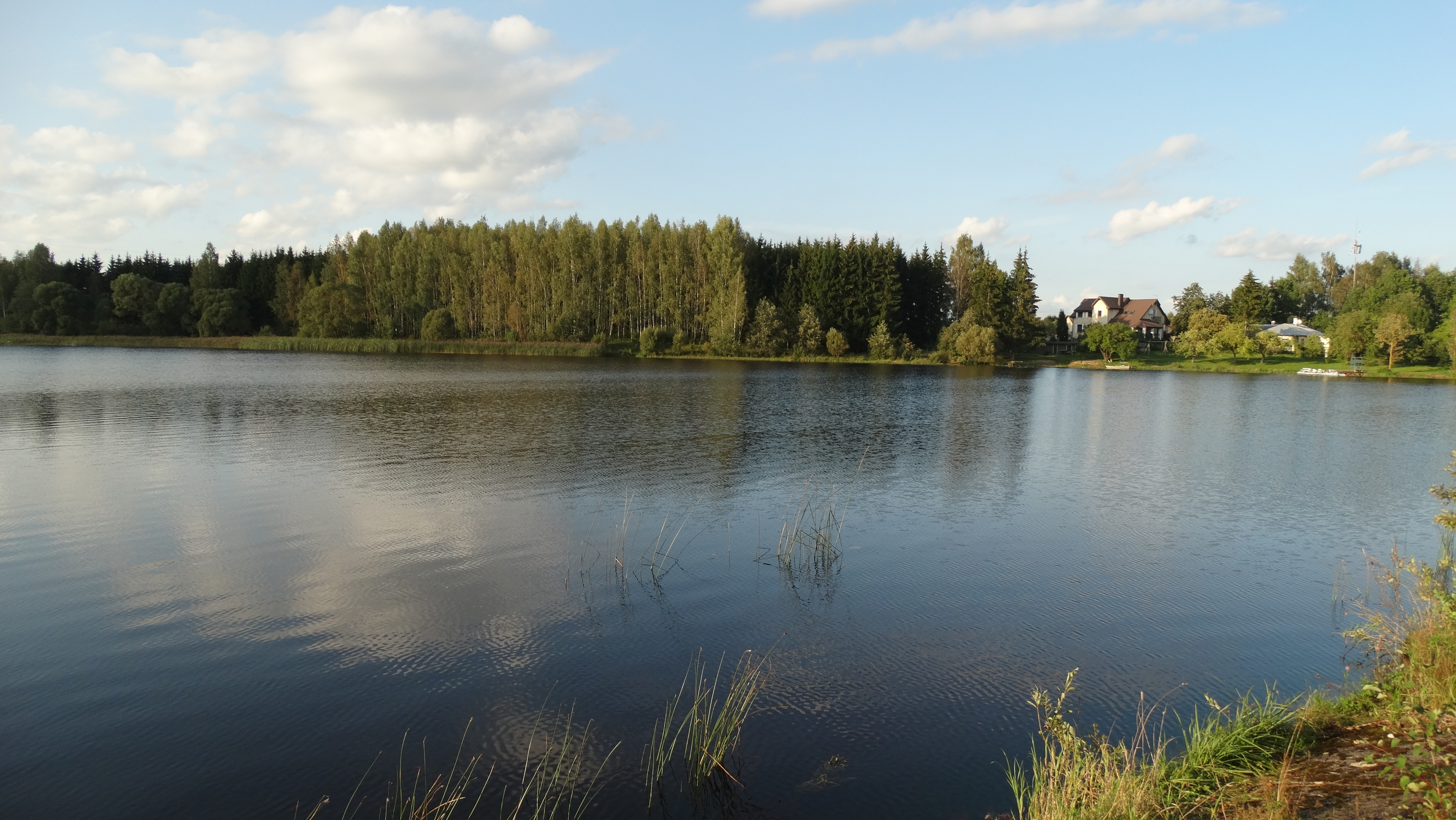
View of a pond

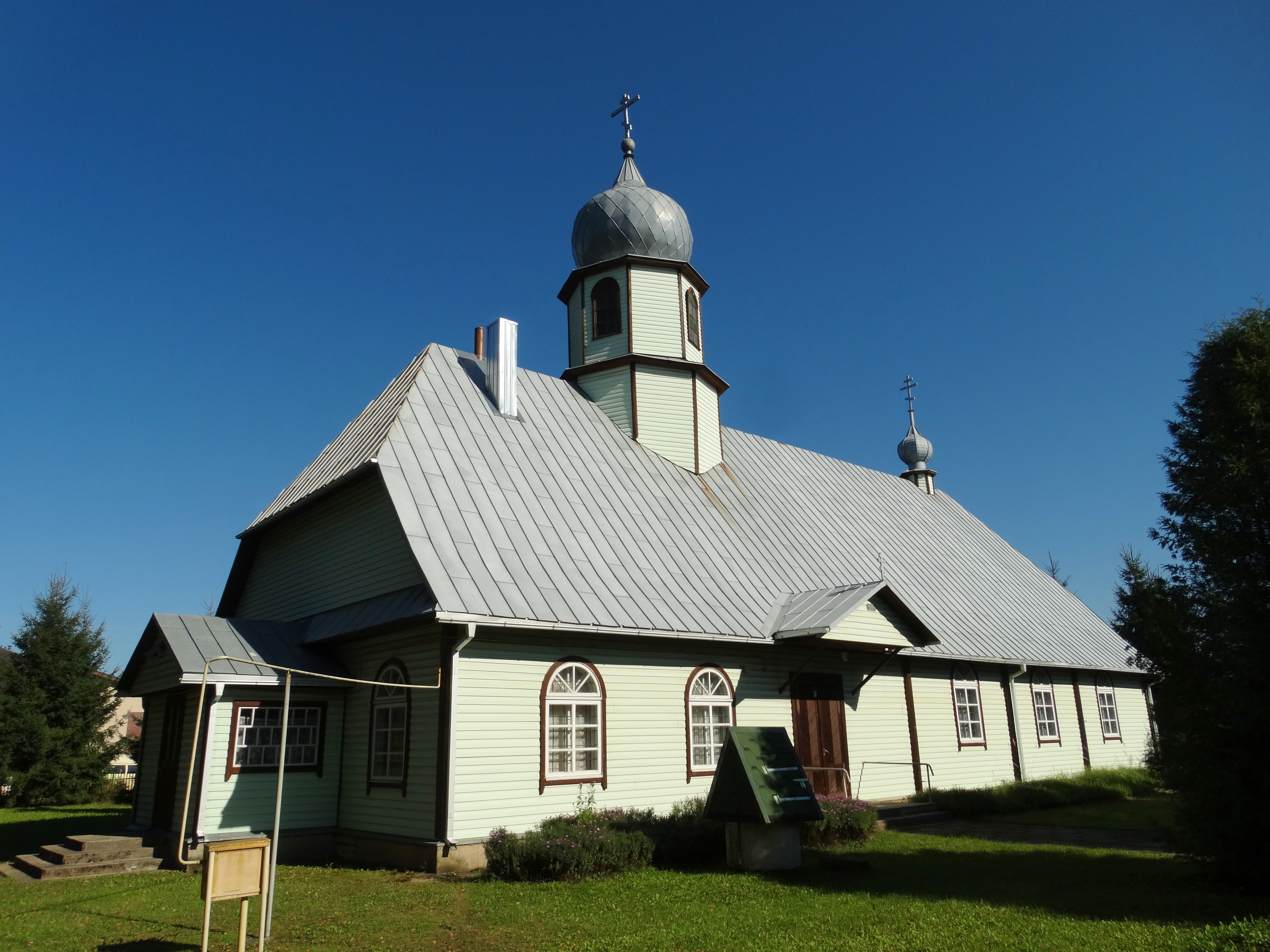
Church of the Old Believers

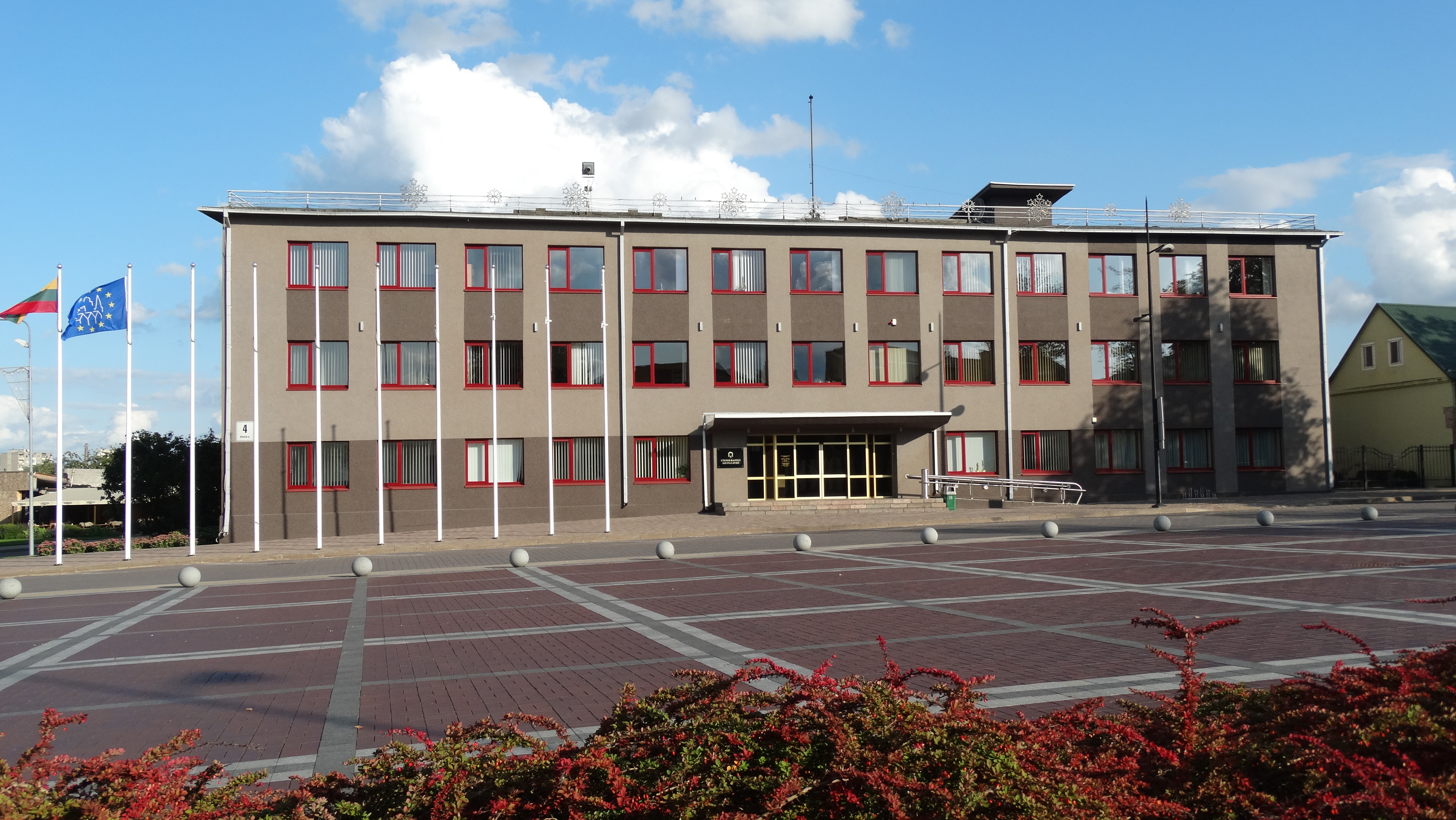
Utena City Council

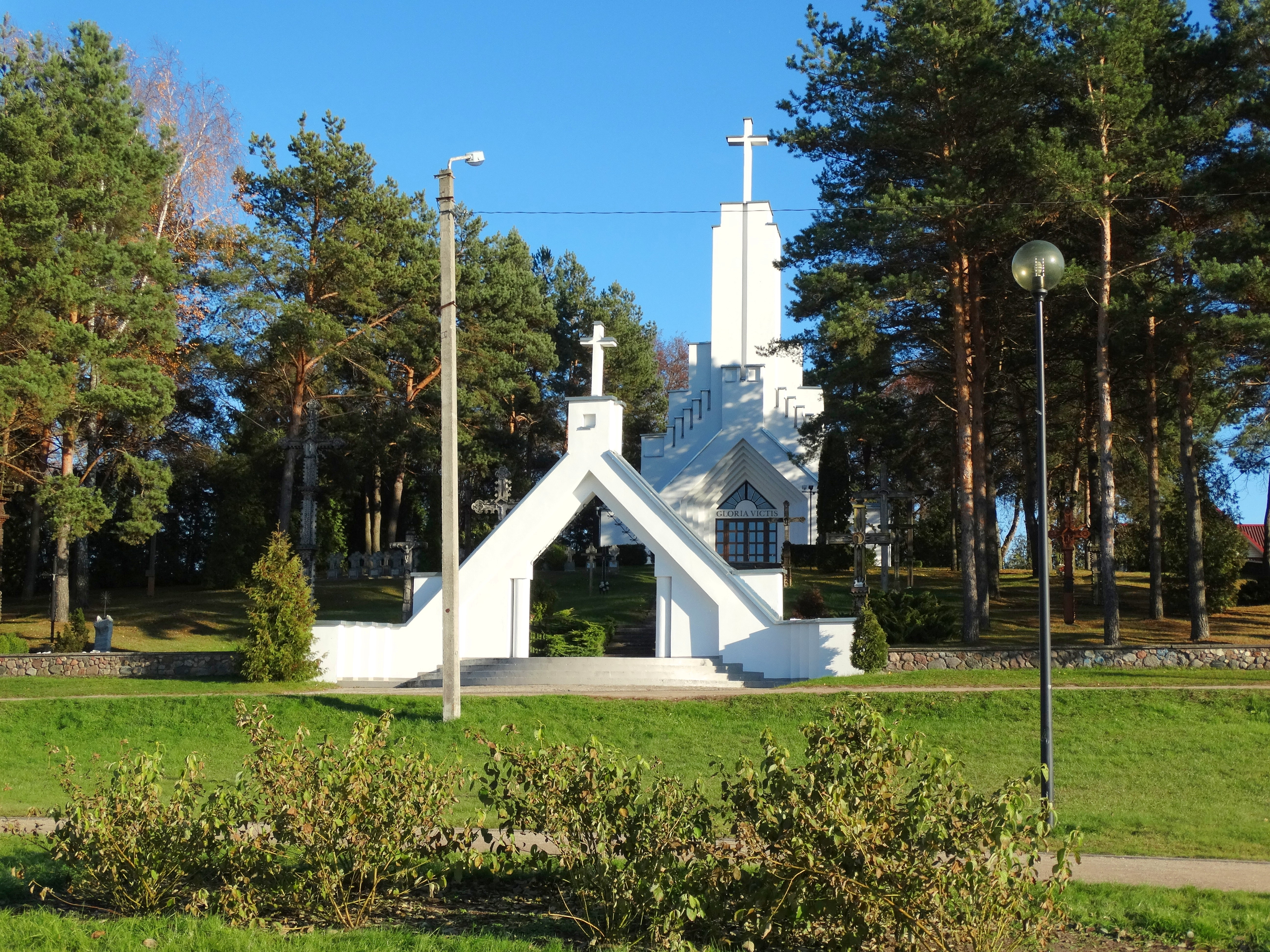
Memorial for the Lithuanian partisans

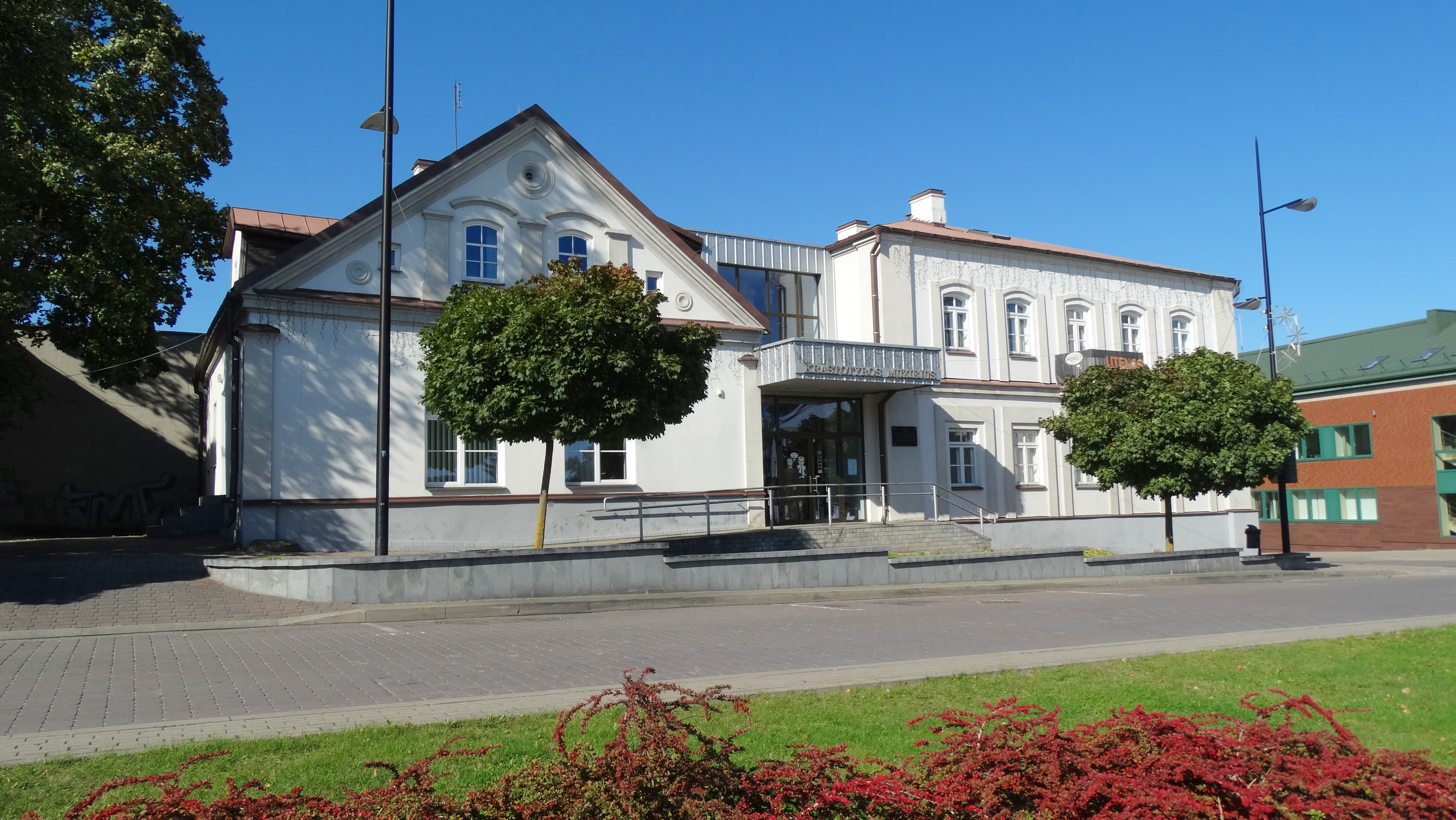
Museum of local history

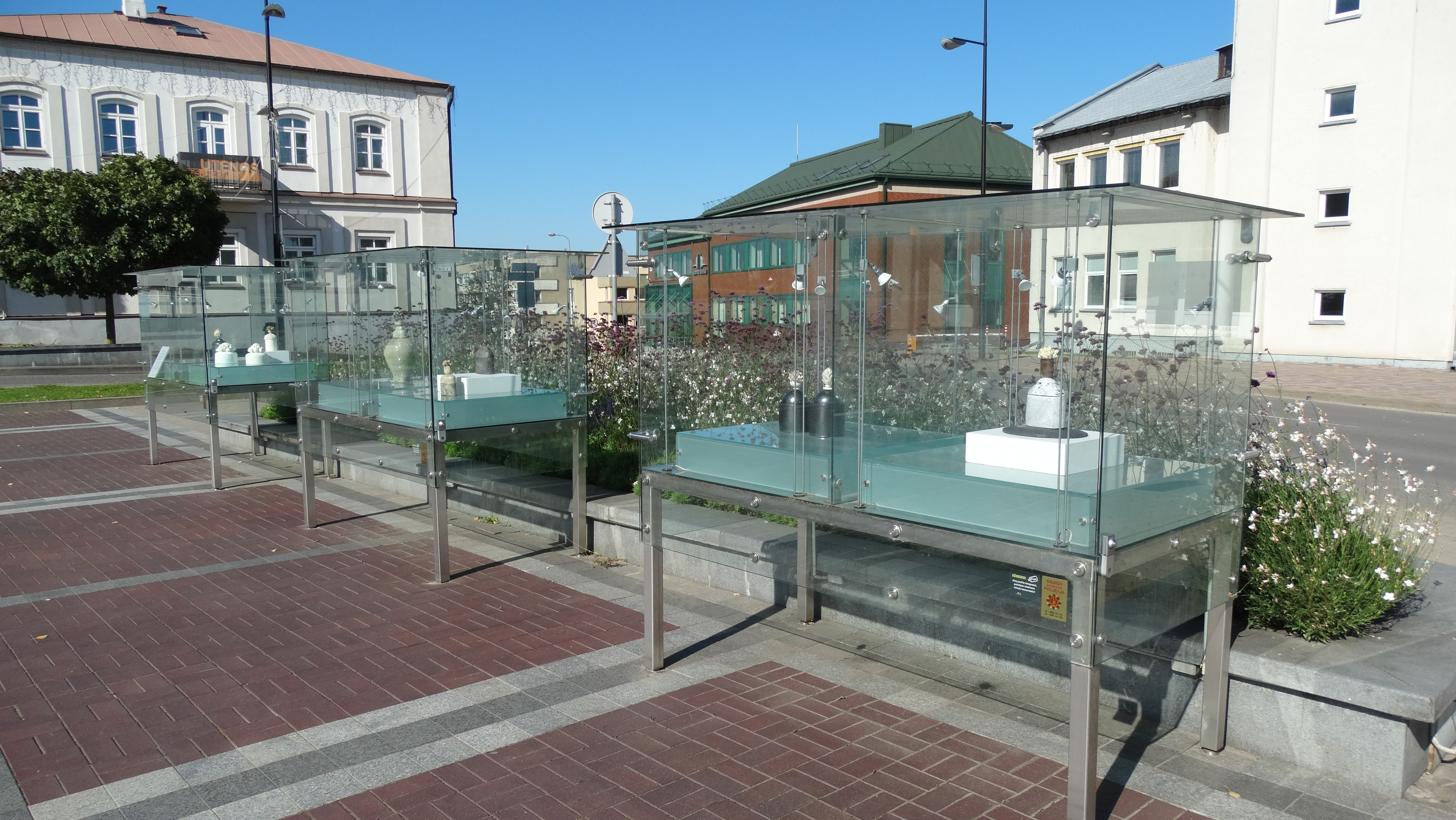
Museum exposition in the city square
