= Flemish Guard =

Collaborationists in occupied Belgium

The Flemish Guard (Dutch: Vlaamsche Wacht) was a collaborationist paramilitary formation which served as an auxiliary police in parts of German-occupied Belgium during World War II. It existed between 1941 and 1944.

The Flemish Guard was founded as an independent formation in May 1941 at the initiative of the Union of Flemish Veterans (Verbond van Vlaamsche Oudstrijders, VOS) and the Flemish National League (Vlaamsch Nationaal Verbond, VNV). Both associated with the pre-war Flemish Movement, the VNV soon emerged as the largest collaborationist faction in Flanders during the occupation. In propaganda, the Flemish Guard was depicted as the police force of a future independent Flanders. It was distinct from the Flemish Legion, formed by the VNV in July 1941, to participate in the German invasion of the Soviet Union as a formation attached to the Waffen-SS.

The Flemish Guard was finally brought under exclusive German control in July 1944 following the Allied landings in Normandy. By the time of the Liberation of Belgium in September 1944, the Flemish Guard was withdrawn into Germany and its remaining personnel were brought in to increase the strength of the newly created 27th SS Volunteer Grenadier Division Langemarck.

== See also ==
- Walloon Guard, a similar organisation established in November 1941 under direct German control.

== Bibliography ==
- Meyers, Willem C.M.; de Wever, Bruno. "Vlaamsche Wacht". Nieuwe Encyclopedie van de Vlaamse Beweging (NEVB) Online (in Dutch). Lannoo. Archived from the original on 9 October 2022.
