= 256th Lithuanian Police Battalion =

- Lithuanian: 256-asis lietuvių policijos batalionas
- Active: 1943 March 24–1945 May 8
- Country: German-occupied Lithuania
- Allegiance: Nazi Germany
- Branch: Ordnungspolizei
- Type: Infantry

256th Lithuanian Police Battalion (Lithuanian: 256-asis lietuvių policijos batalionas) was a Lithuanian auxiliary police battalion formed in August 1943. Initially, it was named the 10th Lithuanian Police Battalion, but it soon was renumbered as the 256th. It continued to fight until the Capitulation of Germany.

== Formation ==
On 24 March 1943, the battalion started being formed in the Žaliakalnis' barracks in Kaunas, which used to house the 1st Hussar Regiment. The Chief of Ordnungspolizei in Lithuania ordered that the newly formed battalion should be formed from policemen of the Schuma and public police suitable for SS service. It was foreseen that the battalion would consist of 715 officers and men, all of which were to be sent from the public police and auxiliary police battalions. So, about two hundred soldiers and fifteen officers were transferred from other Lithuanian auxiliary police battalions to the 10th Battalion, as well as five hundred policemen of the Public Police from Vilnius, Kaunas, Šiauliai, Panevėžys, Mažeikiai, Marijampolė, Utena and other district towns.

The number of men transferred from other units
Bn. No.	No. of officers	No. of soldiers
1st	3 (Note: One officer designated as company commander)	54
6th	3	-
9th	6 (Note: Two officers designated as company commanders)	69
14th	3 (Note: One officer designated as company commander)	86

== Organisation ==
By the order on 27 February 1942 of the chief of the Ostland Ordungspolizei, in a company of an auxiliary police battalion, there should be 140 men and there should be 40 men in the battalion's staff. Structure of the 10th Police Battalion was:

- HQ Staff
- 1st Company
- 2nd Company
- 3rd Company
- 4th Company

== Weaponry ==
The Schuma Battalion is supposed to have been armed with Russian weaponry.

== History ==
On 29 March 1943, after solemnly marching in Kaunas through the Tomb of the Unknown Soldier, the Freedom Monument on Donelaitis Street, the battalion's soldiers were seated in trains at Šančiai and left for the Eastern Front.

=== In Pskov Oblast ===
In April, the 10th Battalion was in Novgorod Oblast near Lake Ilmen, where it fortified its positions next to the Volkhov river, which were previously occupied by the Spanish Blue Division. Next to the Lithuanian Battalion, there was a Latvian Police Battalion. Both units were subordinated to the 4. SS-Polizei-Panzergrenadier-Division. The Battalion sometimes fought with leading units of the Red Army and raided the enemy's positions.

Lithuanian soldiers killed in action between April and October
Rank	Name	Birth date	Death date	Notes
Pvt.	Antanas Vaikutis	1909	1943 04 16	
2nd Lt.	Gediminas Kazys Skardinskas (Skardys)	1916	1943 05 23	
Pvt.	Domas Požėla	1915	1943 06 06	Killed by a mine fragment; buried in the Yuriev Monastery's cemetery
Pvt.	Bronius Tvaskus	1920	1943 08 28	
Pvt.	Vytautas Alilionis	1922	1943 09 04	

The Battalion's first wounded were jaunesnysis puskarininkis J. Mockus and grandinis I. Zelenkovas, both of whom were awarded the Wound Badge.

On 13 August 1943, the 10th Battalion was renumbered to 256th Lithuanian Police Battalion. On December 1, after Lithuanian opposition to the SS Legion's formation, the three Lithuanian Police battalions under SS control (5th, 10th and 13th) were transferred to the Wehrmacht.

In February 1944, when the Soviet Army launched a successful offensive in the region of the Ilmen river, the 256th Battalion retreated to Ostrov in Pskov Oblast, being continuously engaged in defensive battles against the Red Army and the Soviet partisans. During these battles, far more soldiers were killed or wounded. In March, the Battalion was moved from Ostrov to the Aukštoji Panemunė barracks of Kaunas for refitting and strengthening with new soldiers.

In May, the 256th Battalion was transported by train to Opochka, where it guarded the bridges and railway between Opochka and Krasnogorodsk. During the summer of 1944, the unit partook in a large anti-partisan operation, but the Lithuanians did not engage in fighting with partisans as they stood in a barrier at the edge of the forest. Unfortunately, Pvt. Zubavičius stepped on a mine and was killed while several other were wounded.

=== In the Courland Pocket ===
In September, the Battalions soldiers retreated by foot towards the Baltic Sea. The soldiers destination was Ziemupe town, in between Liepāja and Pāvilosta, where it arrived in October. Here the soldiers guarded the Baltic Sea coast against Soviet landings.

On 13 October 1944, the Red Army occupied Riga and from October 15, the fight for Courland was on. In Army Group Courland, there was in total three Lithuanian Schuma Battalions - the 5th, 13th and 256th. The 256th Battalion was assigned to the XXVIII Army Corps of the 18th, later 16th Army.

On 14 March 1945, the Battalion was ordered to march to the town of Ķīburi, the HQ of the Army Group Courland. From here it was ordered to occupy a strip in the front line along the Bārta river, where it remained until German capitulation. In the last two months of the war, the battalion fought with attacking Soviet troops.

== After Capitulation ==
On 8 May 1945, most of the 256th Battalion, like the 5th and 13th Battalions, were taken prisoner of war (POW) and were sent to POW camps or filtration camps, where they were interrogated by the NKVD and later tried by war tribunals. Most of the soldiers refused to surrender and attempted to escape to Lithuania and join the Lithuanian partisans or to be interned in Sweden.

=== Continuing the fight against Bolshevism ===
Among those attempting to escape to Lithuania were Major Jonas Semaška, Captain Pranas Mikelskas, Captain Stepas Januševičius and others.

=== Escape to Sweden ===
On 10 May 1945, a group of sixteen men attempted to swim to Gotland from Pāvilosta by a motorboat, where they were interned. Among the group, there were ten Lithuanians:

- Major Pranas Ambraziūnas,
- Captain Valdemaras Langys (Langė),
- Lieutenant Vincas Lengvelis,
- Lieutenant Justinas Plevokas,
- Lieutenant Jonas Jančys,
- Lieutenant Soteras Vosylius,
- Battalion's doctor Vincas Zenkevičius,
- Viršila Stasys Dranseika,
- Non-commissioned officer Vacys Ingelevičius,
- Private Pranas Plaškys.

On 25 January 1946, the Swedish extradited the Baltic soldiers, and all of the interned Lithuanians were given over to USSR, except for Pranas Plaškys, who was released prior to the extradition because he was underage. All of them were repressed and sent to Gulag. Even now, some of their fates are unknown.

== Commanders ==
From the formation to March 1945, the commander of the battalion was Capt. Jonas Matulis, transferred from the 14th Lithuanian Police Battalion

In March 1945, Major Pranas Ambraziūnas was named commander of the 256th Schuma Battalion after the 5th Lithuanian Police Battalion which he previously commanded was disbanded. According to the interrogation protocol of Pranas Ambraziūnas on 30 October 1950, he was awarded the rank of major and 2nd Class of the Iron Cross for his long service in the German Army and good organization of the battalion's retreat.

It is known that at different times, the Battalion's companies were led by:

- Lieutenant Albinas Molis (1st Company)
- First lieutenant (Lithuanian: vyr. ltn.) Justas Plevokas (3rd Company)
- Lieutenant Soteras Vosylius
- Captain Voldemaras Langys (Langė?)
- Captain Vladas Puodžiūnas
- Captain B. Armonas
- Lieutenant Vincas Lengvelis

== Curiosities ==
In 1943, Cpl. (Lithuanian: Jaunesnysis Puskarininkas) Bronius Žymantas made a wooden scale model of Yuriev monastery. When the same soldier was in Gulag, his talent was noticed by the chief, so Bronius Žymantas was exempted from heavy labour and instead made beautiful wooden furniture for those of the NKVD and their wives. On 19 April 1946, Bronius Žymantas was released from the Gulag after nearly a year when he was captured.

== Sources ==
- Arūnas Bubnys. Lietuvių policijos batalionai Pskovo srityje ir Kurše: 13-asis ir 10(256)-asis batalionai (1942–1945)
- Robertas Čerškus. Bronius Žymantas – karys ir menininkas
- 10-asis savisaugos batalionas
- Bubnys, Arūnas (2017). Lietuvių policijos batalionai 1941-1945 m. Vilnius: Lietuvos gyventojų genocido ir rezistencijos tyrimo centras. ISBN 978-609-8037-68-5.
