= Arūnas Bubnys =

Lithuanian historian and archivist

Arūnas Bubnys (born November 7, 1961) is a Lithuanian historian and archivist. He started his studies at Vilnius University in 1985. In 1993 he received a Ph.D. for the thesis Lietuvių antinacinė rezistencija 1941–1944 m. (English: Lithuanian Anti-Nazi Resistance 1941-1944).

From 1985 on he worked in the Lithuanian Institute of History. In 1993-1998 he was the director of Lithuanian Special Archives. Currently, he works at the Genocide and Resistance Research Centre of Lithuania and is a member of the International Commission for the Evaluation of the Crimes of the Nazi and Soviet Occupation Regimes in Lithuania.

== Fields of interest ==
- Nazi politics in occupied Lithuania
- Lithuanian resistance against Nazi
- Polish underground in Lithuania 1941-1944

== Major works ==
- Lenkų pogrindis Lietuvoje 1939–1940 m. (English: Polish Underground in Lithuania 1939-1940), Vilnius, 1994.
- Lietuvių antinacinė rezistencija 1941–1944 m. (English: Lithuanian Anti-Nazi Resistance 1941-1944), Vilnius, 1991.
- Vokiečių okupuota Lietuva (1941–1944) (English: Lithuania, Occupied by Germans (1941-1944)), Vilnius, 1998.
