= Petras Stankeras =

Lithuanian historian

- Born: June 29, 1948 (age 78); Trakai, Lithuania
- Education: Vilnius Pedagogical Institute
- Occupation: Historian
- Known for: Research on WWII, Lithuanian police, and Holocaust-related topics
- Notable work: Lietuvių policija 1941–1944 metais (1998), Pralaimėta Adolfo Hitlerio kova (2014)
- Awards: Doctor of Humanities (2000)

Petras Stankeras (born 29 June 1948 in Trakai, Lithuania) is a Lithuanian historian specializing in World War II.

== Biography ==
In 1972, Stankeras graduated from the Faculty of History of Vilnius Pedagogical Institute. He worked as a senior research fellow of the Lithuanian Central State Archive in 1973–1977 and an engineer of road construction in 1977–1982. In March 1982, Stankeras joined the Lithuanian Ministry of the Interior. He achieved the rank of lieutenant colonel. From 2000 to 25 November 2010, he was a career public employee of the Ministry of the Interior. Member of Lithuanian police veterans association.

== Historian ==
From the age of fifteen, Stankeras took a great interest in the history of World War II, German National Socialism, Italian Fascism, and the Lithuanian police. He put together a catalog of 20,000 personnel files of various war criminals and an archive of 100,000 photos.

In 2000, Stankeras defended his Ph.D. dissertation Lithuanian Police during the Nazi Occupation in 1941–1944 (Organizational Structure and Personnel) at Vytautas Magnus University. The work was published by the Genocide and Resistance Research Centre of Lithuania in 1998. Another book on the same topic was published in 2008 and partially translated into Russian in 2009. In 2014, Stankeras published Pralaimėta Adolfo Hitlerio kova (The Lost Struggle of Adolf Hitler) in which he translated and annotated large excerpts from Hitler's Mein Kampf. In addition, Stankeras coauthored 12 scientific books, published 250 articles in scientific and popular magazines in Lithuania, Poland and the United States, presented both at national and international academic conferences. Stankeras is a board member of the Lithuanian Military History Society.

== Controversy ==
On 8 November 2010, magazine Veidas published his article about the Nuremberg trials, in which the following sentence was printed: It is important as well that the Nuremberg process provided a legal basis for the legend of about 6 million supposedly murdered Jews even though in fact the court did not have a single document signed by Hitler ordering to exterminate Jews (this document, if it exists, has not been found, even though a million dollar reward has been promised). The sentence caught attention on 23 November and was interpreted to express denial of the Holocaust. Leonidas Donskis published a blog post while seven ambassadors (Great Britain, Estonia, Netherlands, Norway, France, Finland and Sweden) sent a letter to the Minister of Interior Raimundas Palaitis. Stankeras was forced to resign on 25 November 2010. In a subsequent interview Stankeras explained that he intended only to question the six-million figure, while editor-in-chief of Veidas admitted that the location of the word supposedly was a copy-editing error. Other commentators pointed out that the overall article was sympathetic to the Nazis on trial. The Prosecutor's Office of Vilnius County started a criminal pre-trial investigation, but dropped it in February 2011. Simon Wiesenthal Center condemned the prosecutor's decision, while Veidas lamented Stankeras' ruined reputation.

== Bibliography ==
- Lietuvių policija 1941–1944 metais (1998). ISBN 978-9986-757-17-7
- Lietuvių policija Antrajame pasauliniame kare (2008). ISBN 978-5-417-00958-7
- Литовские полицейские батальоны. 1941–1945 гг. (2009) ISBN 978-5-9533-3897-4
- Pralaimėta Adolfo Hitlerio kova (2014). ISBN 978-5-417-01075-0
- Stankarų giminės kronika (2014). ISBN 978-609-408-540-6
