= Bandit-warfare Badge =

WW2 German military decoration

Bandit-warfare Badge Bandenkampfabzeichen
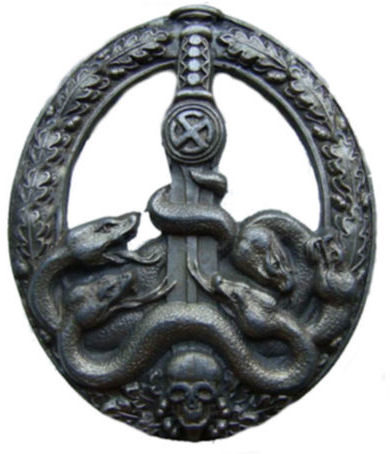
- Bronze grade version
- Type: Badge
- Awarded for: Bandenbekämpfung against those assumed to present danger to the Nazi rule or Wehrmacht's security in the occupied territories.
- Presented by: Nazi Germany
- Eligibility: Wehrmacht, Order Police, and Waffen-SS personnel
- Campaign: World War II
- Status: Obsolete
- Established: 30 January 1944
- Final award: 1945

Bandit-warfare Badge (Bandenkampfabzeichen) was a World War II decoration of Nazi Germany awarded to members of the army, Luftwaffe, Order Police, and Waffen-SS for participating in Nazi security warfare (Bandenbekämpfung). The badge was instituted on 30 January 1944 by Adolf Hitler after authorization/recommendation by Heinrich Himmler.

== Background ==
Especially on the Eastern Front, the terms "partisan" and "bandit" were applied by the Nazi security apparatus to Jews, communists, Soviet state officials, Red Army stragglers, and any other persons deemed to pose a security risk. Rear-area security operations against armed irregular fighters ("pacification actions") were often indistinguishable from massacres of civilians, accompanied by burning down villages, destroying crops, stealing livestock, deporting able-bodied population for slave labour to Germany, and leaving abandoned orphans.

== Description ==
All versions of the badge feature a skull and crossed bones at the base, with a laurel wreath of oak leaves around the sides and a sword in the center. The sword's handle has the "sun-wheel" swastika, with the blade plunged into a Hydra whose five heads represent the "partisans". The second version of the badge had larger oak leaves in the wreath and a larger "sun-wheel" swastika. Historian Philip W. Blood notes the similarities between the symbol of the occultist Thule Society, with a sword and a swastika, and the design of the badge. He suggests that Himmler and Erich von dem Bach-Zelewski "had sealed [...] Germanic mythology into a medal for Lebensraum".

The badge existed in three grades:

- Bronze, for 20 combat days against "bandits"
- Silver, for 50 combat days against "bandits"
- Gold, for 150 combat days against "bandits"

Criteria were slightly different for the Luftwaffe, being based on 30, 75, and 150 operational flights/sorties flown in support of "bandit-fighting" operations.

== Sources ==
- Scapini, Antonio (2015). The Anti-Partisan Badge. B&D Publishing LLC. ISBN 978-0-9893646-7-6.
- Angolia, John (1987). For Führer and Fatherland: Military Awards of the Third Reich. R. James Bender Publishing. ISBN 0912138149.
- Blood, Philip W. (2006). Hitler's Bandit Hunters: The SS and the Nazi Occupation of Europe. Potomac Books. ISBN 978-1597970211.
