= Hitler's Bandit Hunters =

2006 book by Philip W. Blood

Hitler’s Bandit Hunters: The SS and the Nazi Occupation of Europe
- Author: Philip W. Blood
- Language: English
- Genre: History; Historiography
- Publisher: Potomac Books, an imprint of University of Nebraska Press
- Publication date: 2006
- Publication place: United States
- Media type: Print
- ISBN: 978-1-59797-021-1

Hitler's Bandit Hunters: The SS and the Nazi Occupation of Europe is a 2006 book by the British author and researcher Philip W. Blood. It discusses the evolution of German rear security policies during World War II, from Partisanenkrieg (partisan warfare) to Bandenbekämpfung (bandit fighting), leading to mass crimes against humanity and genocide.

== Themes ==
Hitler’s Bandit Hunters initially examines German rear security doctrines and how they had been shaped by experiences of German military forces against francs-tireurs in the Franco-Prussian War of 1870–71, the German colonial wars at the turn of the 19th century and World War I. According to historian Lee Baker, these experiences formed "a potent and deadly matrix in which attacks behind the front were perceived as criminal banditry and therefore required total annihilation". Immediately after the start of World War II in Europe, and especially during the German–Soviet War, 1941–45, these doctrines were combined with the genocidal plans of the Nazi regime for the racial reshaping of the Eastern Europe to secure the so-called living space (Lebensraum) for Germany.

The book explores the functioning and operations of the rear security units and the close cooperation between the German armed forces (the Wehrmacht (German Army) and the Waffen-SS (Armed SS), the auxiliary collaborationist units and the security forces of the SS). From 1942, rear security operations were coordinated by Erich von dem Bach-Zalewski, as head of Bandenbekämpfung ("bandit fighting") for occupied Europe. The operations were, in the word of historian Ben H. Shepherd who reviewed the work for American Historical Review, a "cover for a vast enterprise of terror and exploitation". The accounts are detailed, giving a vivid picture of operations across Europe.

The last sections detail how the principles of Bandenbekämpfung were exported from the Soviet Union to the rest of occupied Europe. The author argues that war crimes and atrocities committed in the West were not aberrations but a planned campaign directed by the chief of the SS, Heinrich Himmler.

== Reception ==
Shepherd writes that the book "breaks new, important ground" in the study of German rear-security operations during World War II. He finds that Blood "has rendered an invaluable service" in his study of doctrines of German security warfare and the mentality of its higher-level commanders. The findings, according to Shepherd, "illuminate these issues to a new and unsettling degree".

Campbell on the other hand, finds that although the book performs several important tasks, it does none of them well. One of its greatest problems, he contends, is a lack of conceptual clarity. For instance, while categorically stating that Bandenbekämpfung was different to Partisanenkämpfung, Blood never explains what the difference was. He finds that although several important areas are identified, the book does not illuminate them sufficiently.

Baker, writing for The Journal of Military History, commends the book for its thorough analysis and convincing conclusions,

The book presents a compelling picture of the links between the Holocaust and the campaigns against "bandits." In essence it is evidence that Bach-Zelewski and others escaped paying for their crimes and as such fits into recent historiography seeking to remove the postwar whitewash from heinous criminal activity camouflaged as security operations.

— Baker

== See also ==
- Myth of the clean Wehrmacht
- Hitler's War in the East 1941−1945: A Critical Assessment
- Marching into Darkness: The Wehrmacht and the Holocaust in Belarus
