= Bandenbekämpfung =

German historical military concept

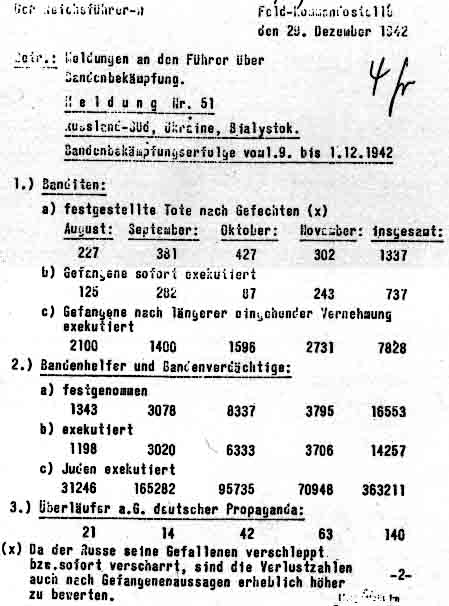
Heinrich Himmler's report Number 51 from 1 October 1942 to 1 December 1942 detailing the murder of "bandits" and Jews in Southern Russia, Ukraine, and the Bialystok District

In German military history, Bandenbekämpfung (lit. '"bandit-fighting" or "combating of bandits"; English equivalent of "anti-partisan operations"'), (Note: See the Preface in Philip Blood's Hitler's Bandit Hunters for a fuller definition of this term.) also referred to as Nazi security warfare during World War II, refers to the concept and military doctrine of countering resistance or insurrection in the rear area during wartime with extreme brutality. The doctrine provided a rationale for disregarding the established laws of war and for targeting any number of groups, from armed guerrillas to civilians, as "bandits" or "members of gangs". As applied by the German Empire and later Nazi Germany, it became instrumental in the crimes against humanity committed by the two regimes, including the Herero and Nama genocide and the Holocaust.

Historian Alex J. Kay estimates that around one million civilians died as a result of German anti-partisan warfare—excluding actual partisans—among the 13 to 14 million people murdered by the Nazis during World War II.

== Background ==
According to historian and television documentary producer Christopher Hale, there are indications that the term Bandenbekämpfung may go back as far as the Thirty Years' War. Civilians and military officers in Prussia during Napoleon's campaign were not themselves unacquainted with the practice of "partisan" warfare as Prussian field marshal August Neidhardt von Gneisenau and military theorist Carl von Clausewitz encouraged mass resistance by civilians and instructed the Landsturm to strike at the French enemy's rear, disrupt their movements, and interdict supply lines in an effort to mobilize its population. The Prussians later termed this identical conduct as "banditry" when the French employed it against Prussian forces in 1870. For the Prussians, the legitimacy of irregular resistance evidently depended not on its nature but on which army it threatened.

Under the German Empire established by Otto von Bismarck in 1871 after the Franco-Prussian War—formed as a union of twenty-five German states under the Hohenzollern king of Prussia—Prussian militarism flourished; martial traditions that included the military doctrine of Antoine-Henri Jomini's 1837 treatise, Summary of the Art of War, were put into effect. Some of the theories laid out by Jomini contained instructions for intense offensive operations and the necessity of securing one's "lines of operations". German military officers took this to mean as much attention should be given to logistical operations used to fight the war at the rear as those in the front, and certainly entailed security operations. Following Jomini's lead, Oberstleutnant Albrecht von Boguslawski published lectures entitled Der Kleine Krieg ("The Small War", a literal translation of guerrilla), which outlined in detail the tactical procedures related to partisan and anti-partisan warfare—likely deliberately written without clear distinctions between combatants and non-combatants. To what extent the teaching of these Prussian military officers and theorists contributed to the intensification of unrestrained warfare cannot be known precisely, but officers like Alfred von Schlieffen encouraged professional soldiers to embrace a dictum that advocated "for every problem, there was a military solution". Helmuth von Moltke the Elder, Chief of the Prussian General Staff, added hostage-taking as a means of deterrence to sabotage activities and the employment of collective measures against entire communities, which became the basis for German anti-partisan policies from 1870 and remained as such through 1945.

== Franco-Prussian War ==
Prussian security operations during the Franco-Prussian War included the use of Landwehr reservists, whose duties ranged from guarding railroad lines, to taking hostages, and carrying out reprisals to deter activities of francs-tireurs. Bismarck wanted all francs-tireurs hanged or shot, and encouraged his military commanders to burn down villages that housed them. (Note: Historian Kenneth Slepyan observes that throughout history, "irregular fighters have walked a fine (and often blurred) line between being popular heroes and outlaws." Although the general citizenry may at times have envied "the freedom and wild lives of fictionalized and mythologized bandits and irregulars... real-life partisans threatened their survival, especially in the harsh conditions of war," when resources were otherwise scarce.) More formal structures like Chief of the Field Railway, a Military Railway Corps, District Commanders, Special Military Courts, intelligence units, and military police of varying duties and nomenclature were integrated into the Prussian system to bolster security operations all along the military's operational lines.

== Boxer Rebellion and Herero Wars ==
Operationally, the first use of tactics later associated with Bandenbekämpfung occurred in China following the Boxer Rebellion (1899–1901), after two German officers went missing. German troops conducted over fifty operations, including burning a village and taking prisoners. Soon after, the infantry received a handbook for "operations against Chinese bandits" (Banden). Inside a German military manual from 1902, one finds the characterization of mass shootings as a "humane" act, since such expedients allegedly shortened wars and reduced German casualties. The first full application of Bandenbekämpfung in practice, was the Herero and Nama genocide (1904–1908), a campaign of racial extermination and collective punishment that the German Empire undertook in German South West Africa (modern-day Namibia) against the Herero and Nama people. The genocidal campaign against the Herero people was so extreme that an estimated 66–75 percent of the population perished.

== World War I ==
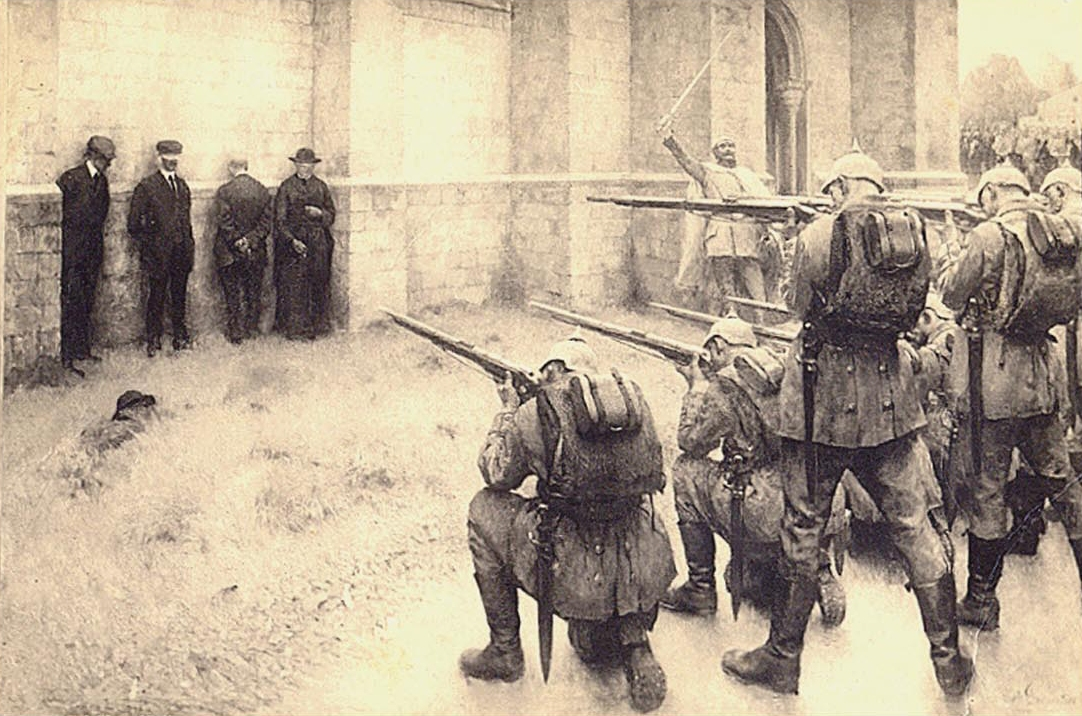
A depiction of the execution of Belgian civilians by German troops at Blegny in August 1914 during the Rape of Belgium

During World War I, the Imperial German Army ignored many of the commonly-understood European conventions of war when between August and October 1914, (Note: A more thorough examination of the German Army's crimes during the First World War can be found in: Horne, John and Alan Kramer. German Atrocities, 1914: A History of Denial. New Haven and London: Yale University Press, 2001.) they murdered some 6,500 French and Belgian citizens. (Note: The German troops were merciless in spite of international efforts highlighted by the Hague Conventions of 1899 and 1907, which included injunctions codifying and restraining "both the conduct of irregular warfare and the measures to which an occupying power should be entitled in order to combat it".) In 1914, German troops, outraged by alleged civilian "resistance", responded with mass reprisals. Though some incidents stemmed from panic, many were the result of explicit orders. Soldiers even admitted to killing civilians—including women and children—based on vague suspicions of gunfire. On some occasions, attacks against German infantry positions and patrols that may have actually been attributable to "friendly fire" were blamed on potential francs-tireurs, who were regarded as bandits and outside the rules of war, eliciting ruthless measures by German forces against civilians and villages suspected of harboring them. These German units "had received orders to show no mercy" and as a result laid waste to towns such as Andenne, Dinant, Tamines, Aarschot, and Rossignol.

Throughout the war, Germany's integrated intelligence, perimeter police, guard network, and border control measures coalesced to define the German military's security operations. Along the Eastern Front sometime in August 1915, Field Marshal Erich von Falkenhayn established the Government General of Warsaw over former Congress Poland under General Hans von Beseler and created an infrastructure to support ongoing military operations, including guard posts, patrols, and a security network. Maintaining security meant dealing with Russian prisoners, many of whom tried to sabotage German plans and kill German soldiers, so harsh pacification measures and terror actions were carried out, including brutal reprisals against civilians, who were subsequently labeled as bandits. Before long, similar practices were instituted throughout the Eastern and Western areas of German occupied territory. Repression intensified under Ludendorff and Hindenburg’s “silent dictatorship” beginning in 1916; they interpreted Clausewitz as justifying total subjugation of enemy nations.

== World War II ==
During World War II, the German Army policy for deterring partisan or "bandit" activities against its forces was to strike "such terror into the population that it loses all will to resist". Even before the Nazi campaign in the East began, Adolf Hitler had already absolved his soldiers and police from any responsibility for brutality against civilians, expecting them to kill anyone that even "looked askance" at the German forces. Much of the partisan warfare became an exercise of antisemitism, as military commanders like General Anton von Bechtolsheim exclaimed that whenever an act of sabotage was committed and one killed the Jews from that village, then "one can be certain that one has destroyed the perpetrators, or at least those who stood behind them". (Note: Bechtolsheim also told members of his 707th Infantry Division that all of the villagers "young and old, men and women" were guilty since they were "products of Bolshevik criminality, consciously grown and nurtured here for quarter of a century.") Historian Jonathan Dimbleby contends that members of the 707th Infantry Division operated on the explicit doctrine that "without a single exception Jews and partisans are an identical concept" and therefore subject to execution without distinction. Commander of Einsatzgruppe B, Arthur Nebe, expressed a similar opinion when he commented: "Where there’s a partisan, there’s a Jew, and where there’s a Jew, there’s a partisan."

Following the Nazi invasion of Poland in 1939 and its reorganisation, security and policing merged with the establishment of Bandenbekämpfung operations. Aside from the groups assigned to fight partisans, additional manpower was provided by the Gestapo, the Kripo (criminal police), the SD, and the Waffen-SS. There were a number of SS-led actions implemented against so–called "partisans" in Lemberg, Warsaw, Lublin, Kovel, and other places across Poland. But it was not only the SS but also the Wehrmacht that carried out such actions. For instance, in the Polish town of Częstochowa (which fell without a struggle on 3 September 1939), German troops indiscriminately torched shops and houses, rounded up some 10,000 citizens—forcing them face-down in the main square before the cathedral—and immediately shot any male found carrying a firearm, razor, or pocket knife; several hundred were killed in what the Wehrmacht officially designated an "anti-partisan" operation.

When the Wehrmacht invaded Yugoslavia in 1941, they carried out mass reprisals against alleged "partisans" in Serbia by executing Jews there. The commander responsible for combating partisan warfare in 1941, General Franz Böhme, reiterated to the German forces, "that rivers of German blood" had been spilled in Serbia during the First World War and the Wehrmacht should consider any acts of violence there as "avenging these deaths". Böhme also instructed his men concerning partisan activity: "...in the event of attacks on German soldiers or ethnic Germans, the hostages will be shot...for every German killed, 100 hostages will be shot. For every wounded German, 50 will be shot. The executions are to be carried out by the troops, if possible by the unit affected by the attacks." Often, the method of execution was adjusted (some more brutal than others) to reinforce the psychological impact of the punishment.

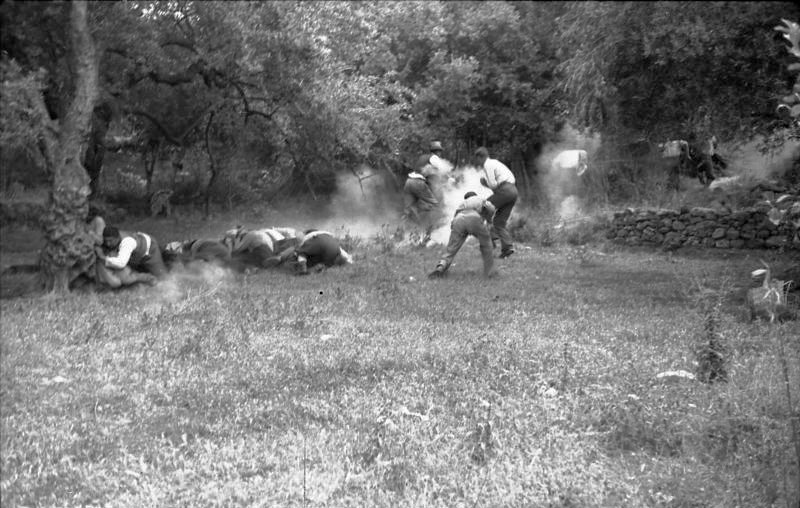
Execution of civilians, Kondomari, Crete, 2 June 1941

During the Battle of Crete (May 1941), German paratroopers encountered widespread resistance from the civilian population. This resistance outraged General Kurt Student, commander of the XI Air Corps, who ordered "revenge operations," consisting of: "1) shootings; 2) forced levies; 3) burning down villages; and 4) extermination of the male population of the entire region". General Student also demanded that "all operations be carried out with great speed, leaving aside all formalities and certainly dispensing with special courts". This contributed to a series of collective punishments against civilians in Kandanos, Kondomari, and Alikianos, immediately after Crete fell. During the Axis occupation of Greece, the emergence of armed resistance from 1942 onward invoked mass reprisals in places such as Viannos, Kedros, Mousiotitsa, Kommeno, Lingiades, Kalavryta, Drakeia, Distomo, Mesovouno, Pyrgoi, Kaisariani and Chortiatis, along with numerous other incidents of smaller scale. Generals whose units also committed war crimes under the guise of Bandenbekämpfung included Walter Stettner, commander of the 1st Mountain Division in Epirus, and Friedrich-Wilhelm Müller, who led the 22nd Air Landing Division in Crete.

Before invading the Soviet Union for Operation Barbarossa, Reichsführer-SS Heinrich Himmler, and Chief of the SD Reinhard Heydrich, as well as SS General Heinrich Müller briefed the Einsatzgruppen leaders of their responsibility to secure the rear areas—using the euphemism "special treatment"—against potential enemies; this included partisans and anyone deemed a threat by the Nazi functionaries. (Note: Moreover, the Wehrmacht leadership welcomed the participation of the Einsatzgruppen units against partisans, viewing the aide of these Nazi executions squads as a necessary measure to help "watch their backs" from potential rear-area sabotage upon their operations.) When Heydrich repeated this directive as an operational order (Einsatzbefehl), he stressed that this also meant functionaries of the Comintern, Jews, and anyone of position in the communist party. This was part of the SS contribution to prevent acts they considered to be criminal in the newly conquered territories, to maintain control, and to effect the efficient establishment of miniature Nazi governments, constituted by mobile versions of the Reich Security Main Office.

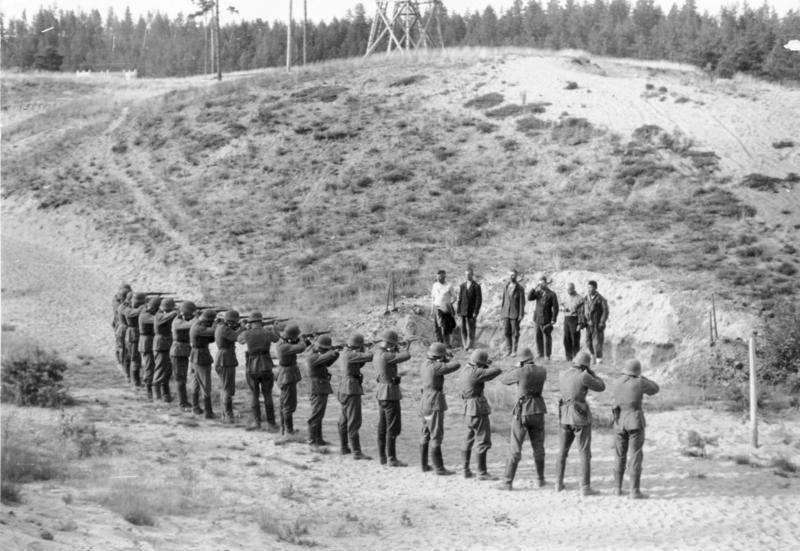
Execution of alleged partisans by German troops, Russia, September 1941

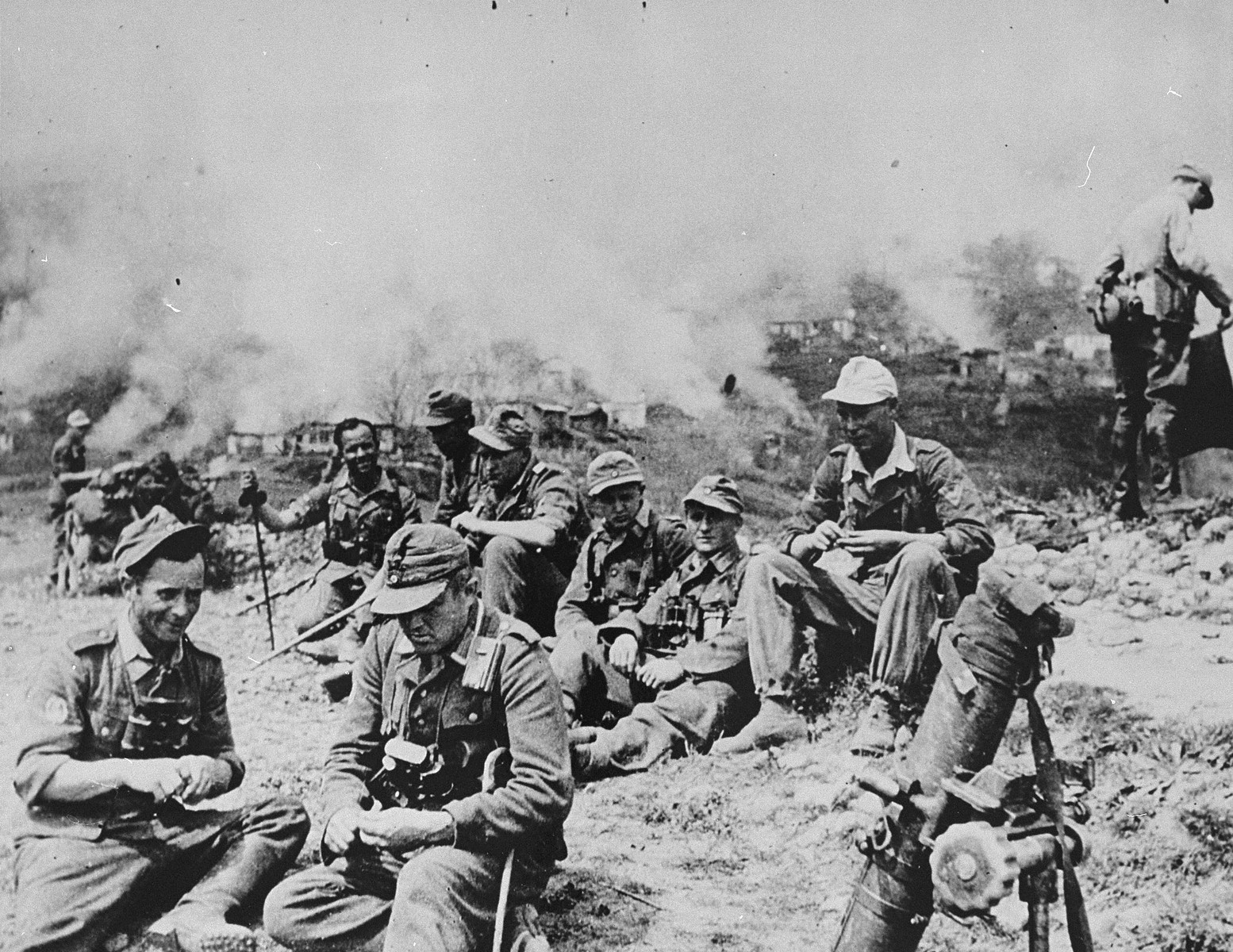
German soldiers relaxing after destroying a village in Epirus, Greece (1942 or 1943)

Starting the same day Germany invaded the Soviet Union (22 June 1941), the 12th Infantry Division command issued orders that guerilla warfare combatants were not to be quartered as POWs but were to be "sentenced on the spot by an officer", meaning they were to be summarily shot. To this end, the Nazis welcomed partisan warfare since in the mind of Hitler, such circumstances opened up "the possibility of annihilating all opposition".

On 31 July 1941, the 16th Army command were informed that any "Partisan-Battalions" formed behind the front that were not properly uniformed and without appropriate means of identification, "were to be treated as guerrillas, whether they were soldiers or not". German field marshal and Oberkommando der Wehrmacht Wilhelm Keitel insisted—in the context of the manpower shortage—on "a reign of terror to discourage the civil population from resisting German rule." Civilians who provided any assistance whatsoever to the partisans were to be dealt with accordingly, which historian Omer Bartov claims "always meant one thing only: death by shooting or hanging". Members of the 18th Panzer Division were instructed likewise on 4 August 1941. Wehrmacht General Gotthard Heinrici brought the same logic to anti-partisan operations, judging that villagers who failed to betray hidden partisans had forfeited any claim to innocence—a convenience that tired, demoralized troops were disinclined to examine too closely. Informers drove the process: in one operation, a single interpreter's intelligence produced the arrest of fifteen partisans, men and women alike, who refused under interrogation to cooperate and were shot; in another, an officer identified forty Red Army soldiers among sixty suspects, personally hanged one in the city center, and "finished off" twenty more—killings Heinrici recorded with satisfaction, his sole objection being that executions conducted within 100 meters of his window made for a disagreeable morning view.

Nearly always, the Nazis' genocidal measures were "camouflaged" in reports by coded formalised language, using terms like Aktion, Sonderbehandlung (special handling), or Umsiedlung (relocated). From September 1941 onwards through the course of World War II, the term Bandenbekämpfung also supplanted Partisanenkämpfung (anti-partisan warfare) to become the guiding principle of Nazi Germany's security warfare and occupational policies; largely as a result of Himmler's insistence that for psychological reasons, bandit was somehow preferable. Himmler charged the "Prinz Eugen" Division to expressly deal with "partisan revolts". Units like the SS Galizien—who were likewise tasked to deal with partisans—included foreign recruits overseen by experienced German "bandit" fighters well-versed in the "mass murder of unarmed civilians".

In keeping with these extreme measures, the OKW issued orders on 13 September 1941, that "Russian soldiers who had been overrun by the German forces and had then reorganised behind the front were to be treated as partisans—that is, to be shot. It was left to the commanders on the spot to decide who belonged to this category." In late 1941, German security divisions, including the 707th, 286th, 403rd, and 221st, conducted operations in Belarus that resulted in the execution of thousands of civilians, predominantly Jews. Between 11 October and 11 November 1941, with Order Police assistance, the 707th division itself executed no fewer than 10,431 persons. These actions were officially reported as anti-partisan activities, but the minimal German casualties suggest that these were not genuine combat operations against armed resistance but campaigns of terror. Correspondingly, terror became a deliberate military instrument and had already crystallized by December 1941, indicated by a comment from the operations officer of the 6th Army, who wrote to Army Group South on 7 December that consequent their field experience, they had learned: "Only those measures that frighten the population more than the terror of the partisans lead to results."

Following the murder of upwards of 30,000 Jews during late July 1942 in the Minsk Ghetto—comprised by eastern and German Jews (most of the latter from Hamburg)—Commisar-General Wilhelm Kube, the ranking German official in Minsk, commented that: "The danger of the partisans being able to rely on Jewry in the future will then no longer exist. For me and the SD, it would naturally be most desirable to eliminate Jewry in General Region White Ruthenia altogether—once the Wehrmacht's economic claims have been satisfied." (Note: On 22 September 1943, Kube was killed after Soviet partisans planted an explosive device beneath his bed at his otherwise heavily-guarded residence.) Such unrestrained violence by Nazi forces—particularly police commandos—in burning down villages and deporting potential eastern laborers at gunpoint "stoked the Soviet partisan movement" according to historian Jochen Hellbeck. Many local inhabitants began leaving their villages "in droves" to join the resistance movement.

=== Führer Directive 46 ===
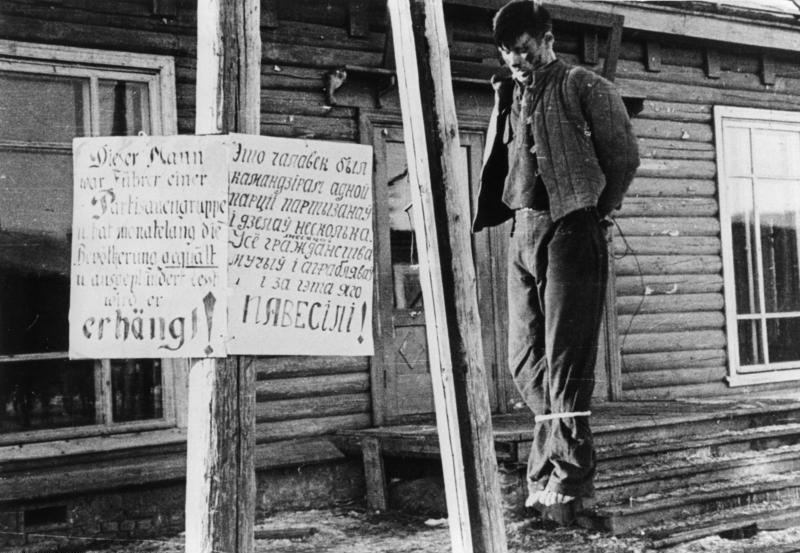
A supposed partisan summarily executed by German forces in Minsk, Belorussia in 1942. The placard, in German and Belarusian, reads: "This man was the leader of a guerrilla group, and tortured the population for months, and plundered; therefore he is hanged!"

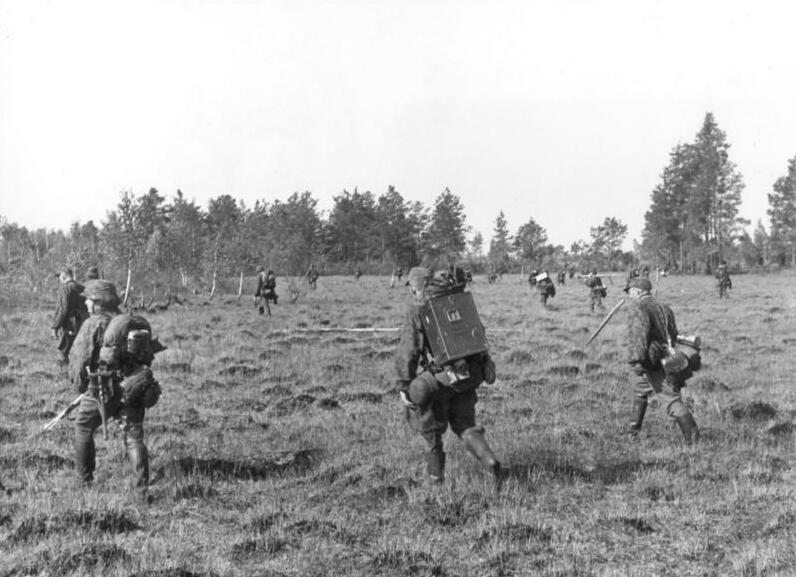
Troopers of the 8th SS Cavalry Division on a Bandenbekämpfung sweep, May 1943

In July 1942, Himmler was appointed to lead the security initiatives in rear areas. One of his first actions in this role was the prohibition of the use of "partisan" to describe counter-insurgents. Bandits (Banden) was the term chosen to be used by German forces. Hitler insisted that Himmler was "solely responsible" for combating bandits except in districts under military administration; such districts were under the authority of the Wehrmacht. The organisational changes, putting experienced SS killers in charge, and language that criminalised resistance, whether real or imagined, presaged the transformation of security warfare into massacres.

The radicalisation of "anti-bandit" warfare saw further impetus in the Führer Directive 46 of 18 August 1942, where security warfare's aim was defined as "complete extermination". The directive called on the security forces to act with "utter brutality", while providing immunity from prosecution for any acts committed during "bandit-fighting" operations.

The directive designated the SS as the organisation responsible for rear-area warfare in areas under civilian administration. In areas under military jurisdiction (the Army Group Rear Areas), the Army High Command had the overall responsibility. The directive declared the entire population of "bandit" (i.e. partisan-controlled) territories as enemy combatants. In practice, this meant that the aims of security warfare was not pacification, but complete destruction and depopulation of "bandit" and "bandit-threatened" territories, turning them into "dead zones" (Tote Zonen).

=== Intensification and naming a commissioner ===
On 23 October 1942, Himmler named SS General Erich von dem Bach-Zelewski the "Commissioner for Anti-Bandit Warfare." Bach-Zelewski wasted little time before initiating large-scale operations dedicated to "bandit areas" with an unprecedented degree of violence. Then Himmler transferred SS General Curt von Gottberg to Belorussia to ensure that the Bandenbekämpfung operations were conducted on a permanent basis, a task which Gottberg carried out with fanatical ruthlessness, declaring the entire population bandits, Jews, Gypsies, spies, or bandit sympathisers. During Gottberg's first major operations, Operations Nürnberg and Hamburg, conducted between November through December 1942, he reported 5,000 murdered Jews, another 5,000 bandits or suspects eliminated, and 30 villages burned down.

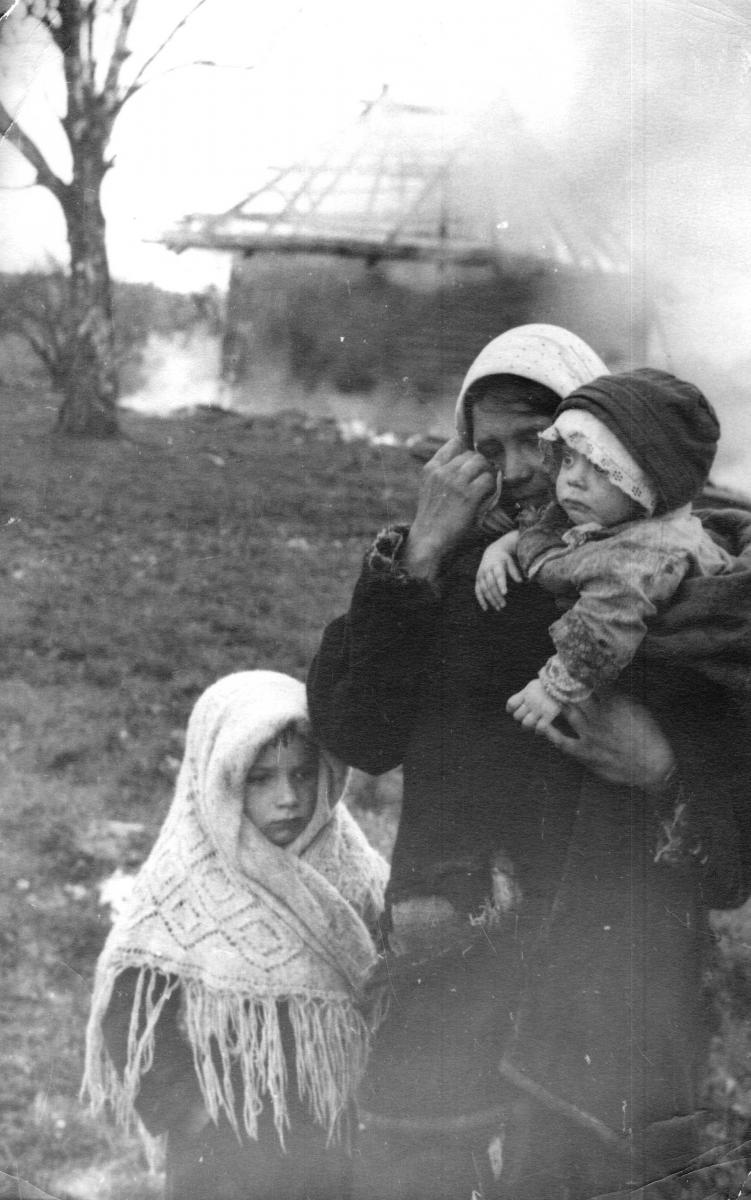
Village residents in front of their burning home during a Nazi Bandenbekämpfung operation in the Soviet Union, July–August 1942

Also in October 1942—just a couple months prior to Gottberg's exploits—Reichsmarschall Hermann Göring had ordered "anti-bandit warfare" in Army Group Rear Area Centre, which was shortly followed by an OKH Directive on 11 November 1942 for "anti-bandit warfare in the East" that announced sentimental considerations as "irresponsible" and instructed the men to shoot or preferably hang bandits, including women. Misgivings from commanders within Army Group Rear that such operations were counterproductive and in poor taste, since women and children were also being murdered, went ignored or resisted from Bach-Zelewski, who frequently "cited the special powers of the Reichsführer." During late November 1942, forty-one "Polish-Jewish bandits" were killed in the forest area of Lubionia, which included "reprisals" against villages in the area. Another action undertaken under the auspices of anti-bandit operations occurred near Lublin in early November 1943; named Aktion Erntefest (Action Harvest Festival), SS-Police, and Waffen-SS units, accompanied by members of the Lublin police, rounded up and killed 42,000 Jews.

Large-scale operations (Grossunternehmen) during 1942–1943 operated under the rhetorical cover of military necessity while functioning in practice as campaigns of plunder and mass murder. Bach-Zelewski's February 1943 guidelines made the economic calculus explicit; he remarked that "every ton of grain, every cow, every horse is worth more than a shot bandit." Agronomists embedded in the battle groups oversaw requisitions, while often determining which villages survived and which were destroyed. The threshold for destruction was quite low as entire villages were wiped out if deemed "bandit-friendly" (bandenfreundlich), a designation requiring no evidentiary standard. Paranoia led to increasingly irrational orders being issued; such proved the case when after coming upon a partisan camp with a large number of bicycles, the commander of the 1st SS Infantry Brigade, Karl von Treuenfeld, directed that "anybody bicycling has to be shot."

Over time, the Wehrmacht acculturated to the large scale anti-bandit operations, as they too came to see the entire population as criminal and complicit in any operation against German troops. Many German Army commanders were unbothered by the fact that these operations fell under the jurisdiction of the SS. Historians Ben Shepherd and Juliette Pattinson note:

As the war dragged on, the occupation's mounting economic rapacity engendered a vicious cycle of further resistance, further German brutality in response, and the erosion of order and stability across occupied Europe. Here, the issue of how occupation strategy shaped the partisan war connects with... how the nature and course of the partisan war was affected by the relationship between the occupied rear and the front line. Indeed, in eastern Europe during World War II, most directly in the Soviet Union, keeping occupied territory pacified was crucial to supplying not just the German front line, but also the German domestic population.

Historian Jeff Rutherford claims that "Whilst the Wehrmacht focused on the Red Army, SD and other SS formations would combat any resistance movements in the rear. In effect, the German Army willingly ensnared itself in the Nazi machinery of annihilation and extermination by working with the SS to systematically suppress partisan movements and other forms of perceived resistance." To this end, Einsatzgruppen, Order Police, SS-Sonderkommandos, and army forces—for the most part—worked cooperatively to combat partisans ("bandits"), (Note: Omer Bartov explicitly states that "in the East military units played a role in identifying Jewish communities for 'special treatment', that is, murder, by the SS; that it took part in so called anti-partisan operations that culminated in the destruction of centres of Jewish habitation; and that soldiers participated regularly, both by orders of their superiors and on their own initiative, in killing Jews wherever they encountered them, even before they turned their attention to other potential targets among the civilian population.") not only acting as judge, jury, and executioners in the field, but also in plundering "bandit areas"; they laid these areas to waste, seized crops and livestock, enslaved the local population, or murdered them. Anti-bandit operations were characterised by "special cruelty". For instance, Soviet Jews were murdered outright under the pretext that they were partisans per Hitler's orders. Historian Timothy Snyder asserts that by the second half of 1942, "German anti-partisan operations were all but indistinguishable from the mass murder of the Jews." Other historians have made similar observations. Omer Bartov argued that under the auspices of destroying their "so-called political and biological enemies", often described as "bandits" or "partisans", the Nazis made no effort "to distinguish between real guerrillas, political suspects, and Jews."

According to historian Erich Haberer, the Nazis' murderous policies toward the Jews provided the victims little choice; driven to "coalesce into small groups to survive in forested areas from where they emerged periodically to forage food in nearby fields and villages, the Germans created their own partisan problem, which, by its very nature, was perceived as banditry." (Note: A partisan leaflet is telling in this regard, as it encourages partisan-style resistance, citing the woeful behaviors of the invading Nazis; the leaflet states: "The Hitlerite cannibals burned the villages, and hundreds of innocent civilians were shot or burned alive. In the village of Uskino a hundred eighty people were exterminated, in the settlements Vjazem and Selets about a hundred, in Bazevich about fifty. The majority were old men, women, and children...As soon as you have threshed the grain from the new harvest, hide it in the woods, establish stores of food, or the Hitler people will expose our people to starvation. Let us not give a single gram of grain to these Hitler-dogs!") Typically these "heroic and futile acts of resistance" against the Nazi occupiers were often in vain considering the "insurmountable odds" of success, although Jews in the Warsaw Ghetto managed to resist for upwards of four months, which historian Patrick Henry notes, was "longer than some national armies" managed. Such activity "worked powerfully against the anti-Semitic stereotype...that Jews would not fight." Correspondingly, there are estimates that 30,000 Jews joined partisan units in Belorussia and western Ukraine alone, while other Jewish partisan groups joined fighters from Bulgaria, Greece, and Yugoslavia, where they assisted in derailing trains, destroying bridges, and carrying out sabotage acts that contributed to the deaths of thousands of German soldiers. (Note: After the war during the 1950s, when scholars were debating "Jewish passivity," the only people whose opinion was deemed legitimate in combating this mistaken view, came from the Ghetto fighters and those who participated as partisans—namely, since they had at least "done something to stop the killing".)

Surging operations from better equipped partisans against Army Group Centre during 1943 intensified to the degree that the 221st Security Division's did not just eliminate "bandits" but laid entire regions where they operated to waste. (Note: This practice was in keeping with Führer Directive 46, where once pro-bandit areas were turned into "dead zones" by the German forces.) The scale of this effort must be taken into consideration, as historian Michael Burleigh reports that anti-partisan operations had a significant impact on German operations in the East; namely, since they caused "widespread economic disruption, tied down manpower which could have been deployed elsewhere, and by instilling fear and provoking extreme countermeasures, drove a wedge between occupiers and occupied".

Following the Warsaw Uprising of August 1944, the Nazis intensified their anti-partisan operations in Poland, during which German forces employed their version of anti-partisan tactics by shooting upwards of 120,000 civilians in Warsaw. Ideologically speaking, since partisans represented an immediate existential threat, in that, they were equated with Jews or people under their influence, the systematic murder of anyone associated with them was an expression of the regime's racial antisemitism and was viewed by members of the Wehrmacht as a "necessity of war". Much of this Nazi mindset in killing partisan "enemies" was not just an immediate expediency but was preemptive warfare against "future" enemies.

By early 1944, the organized partisan movement had expanded to as many as 250,000 combatants—a growth driven less by ideological commitment than by German occupation activities—and the Nazis' callous occupation policies, harsh reprisals, and "the deportation of men and women to work in the Reich" converted early popular ambivalence (especially the case among Belorussians and Ukrainians in the western regions) into something approaching mass resistance. Yet the partisan movement's strategic impact upon the German war effort remained circumscribed; despite having provided "intelligence" and the disruptions to the transport and logistical operations of the Nazis' eastern forces, the partisans neither tied down significant numbers of German front-line troops, nor significantly interrupted German communications," nor did they prevent "the extraction of food and raw materials" by the German forces. In the end, it was "the conventional Red Army, not the partisans," that ultimately expelled the invaders.

=== Development and varied application ===
One developmental aspect of Bandenbekämpfung that accompanied German formations in combating "bandits" was the creation of anti-partisan units composed of SS security police, local police personnel, and nationalist collaborators—such as battalions of Lithuanians, Ukrainians, Latvians, and Poles—whose primary mission was to infiltrate Soviet partisan formations. Their task was to engage partisans in combat where necessary and to assess of civilian morale in occupied territory; the Germans periodically transferred these nationalistic formations between sectors, and in Belorussia alone, their combined strength reached nearly 60,000 men.

Nonetheless, the development of German anti-partisan warfare resists any clear periodization, because it was cumulative rather than sequential—each escalatory measure remaining operative as the next was introduced. What emerged in the end was a system in which preventive terror, large-scale military operations, forced deportation, and systematic depopulation functioned not as alternatives but as simultaneous and mutually reinforcing instruments. Historian Timm Richter claims that the strategy of terror "was just as much entwined with radical forms of racial prejudice and economic exploitation"; a conjunction that made the genocidal character of the anti-partisan campaign not an excess of the system but its logical terminus.

Across western and southern Europe, the implementation of anti-bandit operations was uneven, owing to a constantly evolving set of rules of engagement, command and control disputes at the local level, and the complexity of regional politics with regard to the regime's goals in each respective nation. (Note: Given the Nazis' diverse social engineering projects and its ethnic cleansing as well as its Germanization policies, countries across Europe, such as France, Denmark, Norway, Italy, Czechoslovakia, Yugoslavia, Greece, Albana, Latvia, Lithuania, Estonia, Holland, Belgium, Denmark, Poland, and the UK's Channel Islands all experienced varied and distinctive intensities of German occupation security policies. See for instance: Meershoek, Guus, et al. Repression und Kriegsverbrechen:Die Bekämpfung von Widerstand und Partisanenbewegungen gegen die deutsche Besatzung in West- und Südeuropa. Berlin: Göttingen Verlag der Buchläden Schwarze Risse, 1997, ISBN 978-3-92473-741-2.) France furnishes perhaps the best case study in the unevenness of Nazi practice, since the Wehrmacht pursued no coherent policy of transferring "partisan experts" from East to West; personnel were transferred for instance due to injury, illness, or a general's fall from favor on the Eastern Front, so that division commanders arrived in France carrying whatever habits they had formed there, unmoored from any deliberate strategy. The SS and police apparatus, however, had by 1943 begun deliberately rotating Einsatzgruppen veterans, men like August Meier and Werner Knab into key SiPo posts precisely for their prior brutality in the East. (Note: Had the Nazis not withdrawn from France by mid-July 1944, an office overseeing "all anti-partisan operations in France" with SS-Obergruppenführer Curt von Gottberg—known for excessive brutality and atrocious mass murders under the guise of anti-partisan operations in Belorussia—at the helm would have been created.)

A comparison of three divisions deployed against the Maquis in southwestern France during the summer of 1944 bears this out. The 189th Reserve Division, whose officer corps had the least Eastern Front experience of the three, proceeded with comparative restraint—captured partisans were sometimes shot, sometimes handed to the SiPo/SD, but no large-scale massacre of civilians was recorded under its command. With the 11th Panzer Division, fresh from the East, captured partisans had almost no chance of survival; however, reprisals against the civilian population such as the burning of Mouleydier or the hostage shootings at Mussidan were confined to male adults. The 2nd SS Panzer Division "Das Reich" recognized no such limit; its passage through the Corrèze and Haute-Vienne that June produced hangings at Tulle and the massacre at Oradour-sur-Glane, in which the entire population—women and children included—became targets. Historian Peter Lieb noted that even the Wehrmacht's most hardened units still observed a Western cultural pattern of warfare that confined violence to the male population, a restraint the Waffen SS unit "Das Reich" largely ignored. It seemed the willingness among units—namely the Wehrmacht and the SiPo/SD—to ignore the normal concession of western values in warfare was contingent on the degree of exposure to political indoctrination and National Socialist ideology.

Historian Jeremy Black sums up the Nazi policy against perceived threats from partisans and the intensification of anti-partisan warfare in the following manner:

In 1941, when there was little real partisan threat, the German use of indiscriminate brutality helped accentuate the problem. Subsequently, Soviet success on the front line that winter encouraged partisan resistance, and the Germans responded with increased mass killing...Among the German officers were fanatics who could draw no distinction between partisans and the rest of the population, as well as moderates and self-styled pragmatists, and the last had the most decisive effect on troop conduct. Diversity did not, however, lead to any marked lessening of the institutional ruthlessness that was accentuated by Nazi ideology...A lack of sufficient manpower for the extensive long-term occupation of areas susceptible to the partisans helped lead to a reliance on high-tempo brutality, a correlate of German operations at the front.

In many ways, the operational logic of Bandenbekämpfung produced a "self-defeating" cycle that, paradoxically, accelerated the very resistance it was designed to suppress. When partisans struck a German unit or supply column near a village and then melted away, the arriving German reinforcements—finding neither combatants nor cooperative witnesses—would execute innocent civilians or burn the settlement outright; the population's silence, itself a product of their fear of partisan reprisal for any collaboration, was treated as complicity, which drove survivors directly into partisan formations and deepened the cycle of retribution the operations were meant to end.

=== Bandit warfare and the Holocaust ===
Throughout the war in Europe, and especially on the Eastern Front, doctrines like Bandenbekämpfung amalgamated with the Nazi regime's genocidal plans for the racial reshaping of the Eastern Europe to secure "living space" (Lebensraum) for Germany. In the first eleven months of the war against the Soviet Union, German forces liquidated in excess of 80,000 alleged partisans. Besides the horrendous treatment of Soviet prisoners, the "anti-partisan" campaign in the East highlights the war’s radicalization and the Wehrmacht's complicity in Nazi crimes, including the death of untold numbers of civilian men, women, and children. (Note: At the Nuremberg Trials, SS General Erich von dem Bach-Zelewski—the officer Himmler appointed as Commissioner for Anti-Bandit Warfare in October 1942—testified that, had the military situation in the East not deteriorated, the Germans could have killed approximately "30 million inhabitants of the Soviet Union's southern regions" under the guise of anti-partisan operations.) Implemented by units of the SS, Wehrmacht, and Order Police, the Nazi regime's bandit fighting efforts across occupied Europe led to mass crimes against humanity and became an instrumental part of the Holocaust.

== See also ==
- German anti-partisan operations in World War II
- Hitler's Bandit Hunters: The SS and the Nazi Occupation of Europe
- Marching into Darkness: The Wehrmacht and the Holocaust in Belarus
- Myth of the clean Wehrmacht
- Waffen-SS in popular culture
- Three Alls Policy, a similar doctrine implemented by Imperial Japan
- Zachistka, a similar term used by the Russian Federation

== Bibliography ==
- Bartov, Omer (1991). Hitler's Army: Soldiers, Nazis, and War in the Third Reich. Oxford and New York: Oxford University Press. ISBN 978-0-19506-879-5.
- Bartov, Omer (2001) [1985]. The Eastern Front, 1941–45: German Troops and the Barbarisation of Warfare. New York: Palgrave. ISBN 978-0-33394-944-3.
- Beevor, Antony (2011). Crete: The Battle and the Resistance. John Murray Press. ISBN 978-1848546356.
- Bessel, Richard (2006). Nazism and War. New York: Modern Library. ISBN 978-0-81297-557-4.
- Black, Jeremy (2006). The Age of Total War, 1860–1945. Westport, CT. and London: Praeger. ISBN 0-275-98710-8.
- Blood, Philip W. (2006). Hitler's Bandit Hunters: The SS and the Nazi Occupation of Europe. Potomac Books. ISBN 978-1-59797-021-1.
- Burleigh, Michael (1997). Ethics and Extermination: Reflections on Nazi Genocide. Cambridge; New York: Cambridge University Press. ISBN 978-0-52158-816-4.
- Dimbleby, Jonathan (2021). Operation Barbarossa: The History of a Cataclysm. Oxford and New York: Oxford University Press. ISBN 978-0-19754-721-2.
- Evans, Richard (2010). The Third Reich at War. New York: Penguin. ISBN 978-0-14311-671-4.
- Fritze, Lothar (2014). "Did the National Socialists Have a Different Morality?". In Wolfgang Bialas; Lothar Fritze (eds.). Nazi Ideology and Ethics. Newcastle upon Tyne: Cambridge Scholars. ISBN 978-1-44385-422-1.
- Geyer, Michael; Edele, Mike (2009). "States of Exception: The Nazi-Soviet War as a System of Violence, 1939–1945". In Geyer, Michael; Fitzpatrick, Sheila (eds.). Beyond Totalitarianism: Stalinism and Nazism Compared. Cambridge and New York: Cambridge University Press. ISBN 978-0-521-89796-9.
- Gregor, Neil (2008). "Nazism – A Political Religion". In Neil Gregor (ed.). Nazism, War and Genocide. Liverpool: Liverpool University Press. ISBN 978-0-85989-806-5.
- Grenkevich, Leonid D. (1999). David M. Glantz (ed.). The Soviet Partisan Movement, 1941–1944: A Critical Historiographical Analysis. London and Portland: Frank Cass. ISBN 0-7146-4874-4.
- Haberer, Erich (2010). "The German Gendarmerie and Partisans in Belorussia, 1941–4". In Ben Shepherd; Juliette Pattinson (eds.). War in a Twilight World: Partisan and Anti-Partisan Warfare in Eastern Europe, 1939–45. New York: Palgrave Macmillan. ISBN 978-0-23057-569-1.
- Hale, Christopher (2011). Hitler's Foreign Executioners: Europe's Dirty Secret. The History Press. ISBN 978-0-7524-5974-5. Archived from the original on 23 October 2020.
- Hartmann, Christian (2004). "Verbrecherischer Krieg – verbrecherische Wehrmacht? Überlegungen zur Struktur des deutschen Ostheeres, 1941–1944" (PDF). Viertelsjahrhefte für Zeitgeschichte (in German). 52 (1): 1–75.
- Hellbeck, Jochen (2025). World Enemy No. 1: Nazi Germany, Soviet Russia, and the Fate of the Jews. New York: Penguin Books. ISBN 978-0-59365-738-6.
- Henry, Patrick (2014). "Introduction". In Patrick Henry (ed.). Jewish Resistance Against the Nazis. Washington DC: The Catholic University of America Press. ISBN 978-0-81322-589-0.
- Heer, Hannes (2000). "The Logic of the War of Extermination: The Wehrmacht and the Anti-Partisan War". In Hannes Heer; Klaus Naumann (eds.). War of Extermination: The German Military in World War II. New York: Berghahn Books. ISBN 978-1-57181-232-2.
- Kay, Alex J. (2021). Empire of Destruction: A History of Nazi Mass Killing. New Haven and London: Yale University Press. ISBN 978-0-300-26253-7.
- Langerbein, Helmut (2003). Hitler's Death Squads: The Logic of Mass Murder. College Station, TX: Texas A&M University Press. ISBN 978-1-58544-285-0.
- Leonhard, Jörn (2018). Pandora's Box: A History of the First World War. London and Cambridge, MA: The Belknap Press of Harvard University Press. ISBN 978-0-78643-935-5.
- Lieb, Peter (2008). "Repercussions of Eastern Front Experiences on Anti-Partisan Warfare in France 1943–1944". Journal of Strategic Studies. 31 (5): 797–823. doi:10.1080/01402390802197423.
- Longerich, Peter (2012). Heinrich Himmler. Oxford and New York: Oxford University Press. ISBN 978-0199592326.
- Mawdsley, Evan (2020). World War II: A New History. Cambridge and New York: Cambridge University Press. ISBN 978-1-10849-609-4.
- Mazower, Mark (1995). Inside Hitler's Greece: The Experience of Occupation, 1941–44. Yale University Press. ISBN 0-300-08923-6.
- Messerschmidt, Manfred (2000). "Forward Defense: The "Memorandum of the Generals" for the Nuremberg Court". In Hannes Heer; Klaus Naumann (eds.). War of Extermination: The German Military in World War II. New York: Berghahn Books. ISBN 978-1-57181-232-2.
- Meyer, Hermann Frank (2007). Blutiges Edelweiss. Die 1. Gebirgs-Division im Zweiten Weltkrieg. Ch. Links-Verlag Press. ISBN 978-3861534471.
- Middleton-Kaplan, Richard (2014). "The Myth of Jewish Passivity". In Patrick Henry (ed.). Jewish Resistance Against the Nazis. Washington DC: The Catholic University of America Press. ISBN 978-0-81322-589-0.
- Nolte, Hans-Heinrich (2005). "Partisan War in Belorussia, 1941–1944". In Roger Chickering; Stig Förster; Bernd Greiner (eds.). A World at Total War: Global Conflict and the Politics of Destruction, 1937–1945. Cambridge and New York: Cambridge University Press. pp. 261–276. ISBN 978-0-52183-432-2.
- Richter, Timm C. (1999). "Die Wehrmacht und der Partisanenkrieg in den besetzten Gebieten der Sowjetunion". In Rolf-Dieter Müller; Hans-Erich Volkmann (eds.). Die Wehrmacht: Mythos und Realität (in German). München: Oldenbourg Wissenschaftsverlag. ISBN 978-3-48656-383-2.
- Richter, Timm (2014). "Belarusian Partisans and German Reprisals". In Timothy Snyder; Ray Brandon (eds.). Stalin and Europe: Imitation and Domination, 1928–1953. Oxford and New York: Oxford University Press. pp. 207–232. ISBN 978-0-19994-558-0.
- Rutherford, Jeff (2010). "'One senses danger from all sides, especially from fanatical civilians': The 121st Infantry Division and Partisan War, June 1941 – April 1942". In Ben Shepherd; Juliette Pattinson (eds.). War in a Twilight World: Partisan and Anti-Partisan Warfare in Eastern Europe, 1939–45. New York: Palgrave Macmillan. ISBN 978-0-23057-569-1.
- Sait, Bryce (2019). The Indoctrination of the Wehrmacht: Nazi Ideology and the War Crimes of the German Military. New York and Oxford: Berghahn Books. ISBN 978-1-78920-149-9.
- Sheffield, Gary (2014). A Short History of the First World War. London: One World. ISBN 978-1-78074-364-6.
- Shepherd, Ben H. (January 2003). "The Continuum of Brutality: Wehrmacht Security Divisions in Central Russia, 1942". German History. 21 (1): 49–81. doi:10.1191/0266355403gh274oa.
- Shepherd, Ben H. (2004). War in the Wild East: The German Army and Soviet Partisans. Cambridge, MA: Harvard University Press. ISBN 978-0-67401-296-7.
- Shepherd, Ben H.; Pattinson, Juliette (2010). "Introduction: Illuminating a Twilight World". In Ben Shepherd; Juliette Pattinson (eds.). War in a Twilight World: Partisan and Anti-Partisan Warfare in Eastern Europe, 1939–45. New York: Palgrave Macmillan. ISBN 978-0-23057-569-1.
- Shepherd, Ben H. (2016). Hitler's Soldiers: The German Army in the Third Reich. New Haven and London: Yale University Press. ISBN 978-0-30017-903-3.
- Slepyan, Kenneth (2010). "Partisans, Civilians, and the Soviet State: An Overview". In Ben Shepherd; Juliette Pattinson (eds.). War in a Twilight World: Partisan and Anti-Partisan Warfare in Eastern Europe, 1939–45. New York: Palgrave Macmillan. ISBN 978-0-23057-569-1.
- Snyder, Timothy (2010). Bloodlands: Europe Between Hitler and Stalin. New York: Basic Books. ISBN 978-0-46503-147-4.
- Snyder, Timothy (2015). Black Earth: The Holocaust as History and Warning. New York: Tim Duggan Books. ISBN 978-1-10190-345-2.
- Wawro, Geoffrey (2009). The Franco-Prussian War: The German Conquest of France in 1870–1871. Cambridge and New York: Cambridge University Press. ISBN 978-0-52161-743-7.
- Westermann, Edward B. (2005). Hitler's Police Battalions: Enforcing Racial War in the East. Kansas City: University Press of Kansas. ISBN 978-0-7006-1724-1.
- Yitzhak, Arad (2020). The Holocaust in the Soviet Union. Lincoln, NE: University of Nebraska Press. ISBN 978-0-80322-059-1.
- Ypersele, Laurence van; Debruyne, Emmanuel (2025). "Invaded, Occupied, Liberated: Belgium in the First World War". In Paul R. Bartop (ed.). The Routledge History of the First World War. London and New York: Routledge. pp. 131–142. ISBN 978-1-032-42602-0.
