= Werner Knab =

Werner Knab (18 December 1908 – 15 February 1945) was a German SS-Sturmbannführer (major). He served at the German legation in Norway from 1939, and then as head of Gestapo in Norway from 1940 to 1942, during the occupation of Norway by Nazi Germany. Among others, he led a crackdown on the University of Oslo following the milk strike, and also acted as prosecutor in the court-martial set up in the strike's wake.

In mid-January 1942, Knab was transferred to Ukraine and worked as a member of Einsatzgruppe C, which carried out the mass murder of Jews, from 1941 to 1943. Soon afterwards, he headed the Gestapo department in Kiev.

Appointed senior government councilor in June 1943, Knab became commander of the security police in Lyon on June 23, 1943, in German-occupied France. After the Allies landed in France, massacres of civilians and resistance fighters were carried out on Knab's orders in July 1944 during the Wehrmacht's actions against the French resistance fighters. In a risky airborne maneuver, with Knab's participation, cargo gliders landed near Vassieux, and on his orders, the units under his command shot civilians and captured resistance fighters. In total, two villages and several farms were burned down and a total of 639 Resistance fighters were shot during combat operations or after being captured and 201 civilians were murdered.

Knab was killed in a low-flying air attack in Germany in 1945.
