= Wehrmacht =

Unified armed forces of Nazi Germany from 1935 to 1945

Armed Forces of the German Reich
- Wehrmacht
- Emblem: the Balkenkreuz (Note: Emblem of the Wehrmacht, the Balkenkreuz, a stylized version of the Iron Cross seen in varying proportions.)

- War Ensign: Reichskriegsflagge (Note: (1938–1945 version))
- Motto: Gott mit uns (transl. "God [is] with us")
- Founded: 16 March 1935; 91 years ago
- Disbanded: 20 August 1946; 80 years ago (Note: The official dissolution of the Wehrmacht began with the German Instrument of Surrender of 8 May 1945. Reasserted in Proclamation No. 2 of the Allied Control Council on 20 September 1945, ACC Law No. 34 officially declared the dissolution on 20 August 1946.)
- Service branches: Heer (army); Kriegsmarine (navy); Luftwaffe (air force)
- Headquarters: Maybach II, Wünsdorf; 52.1826°N 13.4741°E

Leadership
- Supreme Commander (1935–1945): Adolf Hitler (first); Karl Dönitz (last)
- Commander-in-chief (1935–1938): Adolf Hitler (first); Werner von Blomberg (last)
- Minister of War (1935–1938, 1945): Werner von Blomberg (first); Karl Dönitz (last) (Note: The ministry was formally revived in April 1945, when Karl Dönitz was named as Minister of War in Hitler's testament.)
- Commander-in-chief of the Wehrmacht High Command (1938–1945): Wilhelm Keitel (first); Alfred Jodl (last)

Personnel
- Military age: 18–45
- Conscription: 1–2 years; national service
- Active personnel: 18,200,000 (total served)

Expenditure
- Budget: 19 billion ℛ︁ℳ︁ (1939) (€85 billion in 2021); 89 billion ℛ︁ℳ︁ (1944) (€359 billion in 2021) (Note: Total GDP: 75 billion (1939) & 118 billion (1944))
- Percent of GDP: 25% (1939); 75% (1944)

Industry
- Domestic suppliers: See list: Alkett; Auto Union; Blohm+Voss; BMW; Daimler-Benz; Dornier Flugzeugwerke; Focke-Wulf; Heinkel; Henschel & Son; Junkers; Krupp; MAN SE; Messerschmitt; Opel; Porsche
- Foreign suppliers: Kingdom of Hungary; Spanish Republic; Kingdom of Sweden; Swiss Confederation
- Annual exports: 245 million ℛ︁ℳ︁ (1939) (€1090 million in 2021)

Related articles
- History: Germany during World War II
- Ranks: Heer ranks; Kriegsmarine ranks; Luftwaffe ranks

The Wehrmacht (German pronunciation: [ˈveːɐ̯maxt], lit. 'defence force') were the unified armed forces of Nazi Germany from 1935 to 1945. It consisted of the Heer (army), the Kriegsmarine (navy) and the Luftwaffe (air force). The designation "Wehrmacht" replaced the previously used term Reichswehr (Reich Defence) and was the manifestation of the Nazi regime's efforts to rearm Germany to a greater extent than the Treaty of Versailles permitted.

After the Nazi rise to power in 1933, one of Adolf Hitler's most overt and bellicose moves was to establish the Wehrmacht, a modern offensively-capable armed force, fulfilling the Nazi regime's long-term goals of regaining lost territory as well as gaining new territory and dominating its neighbours. This required the reinstatement of conscription and massive investment and defence spending on the arms industry.

The Wehrmacht formed the heart of Germany's politico-military power. In the early part of the Second World War, the Wehrmacht employed combined arms tactics (close-cover air-support, tanks and infantry) to devastating effect in what became known as Blitzkrieg (lightning war). Its campaigns in France (1940), the Soviet Union (1941) and North Africa (1941/42) are regarded by historians as acts of boldness. At the same time, the extent of advances strained the Wehrmacht's capacity to the breaking point, culminating in its first major defeat in the Battle of Moscow (1941); by late 1942, Germany was losing the initiative in all theatres. The Wehrmacht's increasingly overextended fronts could not withstand the Allies' growing numerical and material superiority, making weaknesses in German grand strategy, defensive doctrine, and logistics apparent.

Closely cooperating with the SS and their Einsatzgruppen death squads, the German armed forces committed numerous war crimes (despite later denials and promotion of the myth of the clean Wehrmacht). The majority of the war crimes took place in the Soviet Union, Poland, Yugoslavia, Greece, and Italy, as part of the war of annihilation against the Soviet Union, the Holocaust and Nazi security warfare. Only a few of the Wehrmacht's upper leadership went on trial for war crimes, despite evidence suggesting that more were involved in illegal actions. According to Ian Kershaw, most of the three million Wehrmacht soldiers who invaded the USSR participated in war crimes, such as the widespread abuse of captured Soviet prisoners of war.

During World War II about 18 million men served in the Wehrmacht. By the time the war ended in Europe in May 1945, German forces (consisting of the Heer, the Kriegsmarine, the Luftwaffe, the Waffen-SS, the Volkssturm, and foreign collaborator units) had lost approximately 11,300,000 men, about 5,318,000 of whom were missing, killed or died in captivity.

== Origin ==
=== Etymology ===
The German term "Wehrmacht" stems from the compound word of German: wehren, "to defend" and Macht, "power, force". (Note: See the Wiktionary article for more information.) It has been used to describe any nation's armed forces; for example, Britische Wehrmacht meaning "British Armed Forces". The Frankfurt Constitution of 1849 designated all German military forces as the "German Wehrmacht", consisting of the Seemacht (sea force) and the Landmacht (land force). In 1919, the term Wehrmacht also appears in Article 47 of the Weimar Constitution, establishing that: "The Reich's President holds supreme command of all armed forces [i.e. the Wehrmacht] of the Reich". From 1919, Germany's national defense force was known as the Reichswehr, a name that was dropped in favor of Wehrmacht on 21 May 1935.

While the term Wehrmacht has been associated, both in the German and English languages, with the German armed forces of 1933–45 since the Second World War, before 1945 the term was used in the German language in a more general sense for a national defense force. For instance, the German-aligned formations of Poles raised during the First World War were known as the Polnische Wehrmacht ('Polish Wehrmacht', 'Polish Defense Force') in German.

=== Background ===
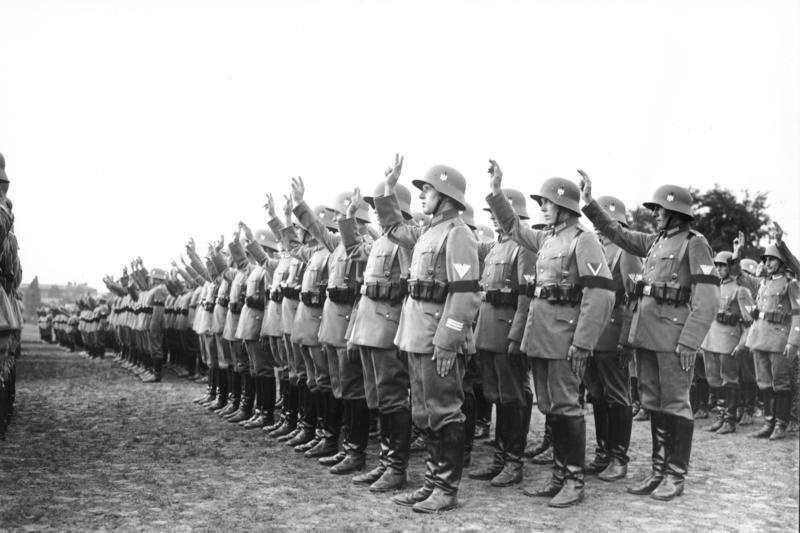
Reichswehr soldiers swearing the Hitler oath in August 1934

In January 1919, after World War I ended with the signing of the armistice of 11 November 1918, the armed forces were dubbed Friedensheer (peace army). In March 1919, the national assembly passed a law founding a 420,000-strong preliminary army, the Vorläufige Reichswehr. The terms of the Treaty of Versailles were announced in May, and in June, Germany signed the treaty that, among other terms, imposed severe constraints on the size of Germany's armed forces. The army was limited to one hundred thousand men with an additional fifteen thousand in the navy. The fleet was to consist of at most six battleships, six cruisers, and twelve destroyers. Submarines, tanks and heavy artillery were forbidden and the air-force was dissolved. A new post-war military, the Reichswehr, was established on 23 March 1921. General conscription was abolished under another mandate of the Versailles treaty.

The Reichswehr was limited to 115,000 men, and thus the armed forces, under the leadership of Hans von Seeckt, retained only the most capable officers. The American historians Alan Millet and Williamson Murray wrote "In reducing the officers corps, Seeckt chose the new leadership from the best men of the general staff with ruthless disregard for other constituencies, such as war heroes and the nobility." Seeckt's determination that the Reichswehr be an elite cadre force that would serve as the nucleus of an expanded military when the chance for restoring conscription came essentially led to the creation of a new army, based upon, but very different from, the army that existed in World War I. In the 1920s, Seeckt and his officers developed new doctrines that emphasized speed, aggression, combined arms and initiative on the part of lower officers to take advantage of momentary opportunities. Though Seeckt retired in 1926, his influence on the army was still apparent when it went to war in 1939.

Germany was forbidden to have an air force by the Versailles treaty; nonetheless, Seeckt created a clandestine cadre of air force officers in the early 1920s. These officers saw the role of an air force as winning air superiority, strategic bombing, and close air support. That the Luftwaffe did not develop a strategic bombing force in the 1930s was not due to a lack of interest, but because of economic limitations. The leadership of the Navy led by Grand Admiral Erich Raeder, a close protégé of Alfred von Tirpitz, was dedicated to the idea of reviving Tirpitz's High Seas Fleet. Officers who believed in submarine warfare led by Admiral Karl Dönitz were in a minority before 1939.

By 1922, Germany had begun covertly circumventing the conditions of the Versailles treaty. A secret collaboration with the Soviet Union began after the Treaty of Rapallo. Major-General Otto Hasse travelled to Moscow in 1923 to further negotiate the terms. Germany helped the Soviet Union with industrialization and Soviet officers were to be trained in Germany. German tank and air-force specialists could exercise in the Soviet Union and German chemical weapons research and manufacture would be carried out there along with other projects. In 1924 a fighter-pilot school was established at Lipetsk, where several hundred German air force personnel received instruction in operational maintenance, navigation, and aerial combat training over the next decade until the Germans finally left in September 1933. However, the arms buildup was done in secrecy, until Hitler came to power and it received broad political support.

== Nazi rise to power ==
After the death of President Paul von Hindenburg on 2 August 1934, Adolf Hitler assumed the office of President of Germany, and thus became commander in chief. In February 1934, the Defence Minister Werner von Blomberg, acting on his own initiative, had all of the Jews serving in the Reichswehr given an automatic and immediate dishonorable discharge. Again, on his own initiative Blomberg had the armed forces adopt Nazi symbols into their uniforms in May 1934. In August of the same year, on Blomberg's initiative and that of the Ministeramt chief General Walther von Reichenau, the entire military took the Hitler oath, an oath of personal loyalty to Hitler. Hitler was most surprised at the offer; the popular view that Hitler imposed the oath on the military is false. The oath read: "I swear by God this sacred oath that to the Leader of the German empire and people, Adolf Hitler, supreme commander of the armed forces, I shall render unconditional obedience and that as a brave soldier I shall at all times be prepared to give my life for this oath".

By 1935, Germany was openly flouting the military restrictions set forth in the Versailles Treaty: German rearmament was announced on 16 March with the "Edict for the Buildup of the Wehrmacht" (German: Gesetz für den Aufbau der Wehrmacht) and the reintroduction of conscription. While the size of the standing army was to remain at about the 100,000-man mark decreed by the treaty, a new group of conscripts equal to this size would receive training each year. The conscription law introduced the name "Wehrmacht"; the Reichswehr was officially renamed the Wehrmacht on 21 May 1935. Hitler's proclamation of the Wehrmacht's existence included a total of no less than 36 divisions in its original projection, contravening the Treaty of Versailles in grandiose fashion. In December 1935, General Ludwig Beck added 48 tank battalions to the planned rearmament program. Hitler originally set a time frame of 10 years for remilitarization, but soon shortened it to four years. With the remilitarization of the Rhineland and the Anschluss, the German Reich's territory increased significantly, providing a larger population pool for conscription. Hitler had foreshadowed his intention to replace the Reichswehr in March 1929, when he declared in a speech in Munich:

“It is in part the Army's responsibility whether Marxism wins or we. If the left is going to win thanks to the non-political attitude of the officers, then you can write the Reichswehr off, this will be the end of it! ... As far as we are concerned, the Reichswehr in its present form is not permanent. For us it will serve as a great cadre army, which produces officers, NCOs; we shall crush anyone into pieces who should dare to hinder us in this undertaking”

== Personnel and recruitment ==
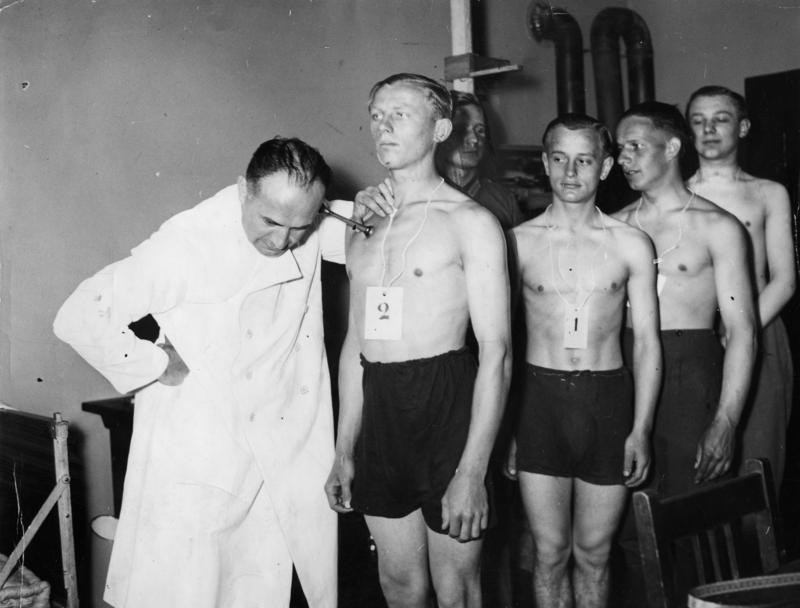
Inspection of German conscripts

Recruitment for the Wehrmacht was accomplished through voluntary enlistment and conscription, with 1.3 million being drafted and 2.4 million volunteering in the period 1935–1939. The total number of soldiers who served in the Wehrmacht during its existence from 1935 to 1945 is believed to have approached 18.2 million. The German military leadership originally aimed at a homogeneous military, possessing traditional Prussian military values. However, with Hitler's constant wishes to increase the Wehrmacht's size, the Army was forced to accept citizens of lower class and education, decreasing internal cohesion and appointing officers who lacked real-war experience from previous conflicts, especially World War I and the Spanish Civil War. The effectiveness of officer training and recruitment by the Wehrmacht has been identified as a major factor in its early victories as well as its ability to keep the war going as long as it did even as the war turned against Germany. As the Second World War intensified, Kriegsmarine and Luftwaffe personnel were increasingly transferred to the army, and "voluntary" enlistments in the SS were stepped up as well. Following the Battle of Stalingrad in 1943, fitness and physical health standards for Wehrmacht recruits were drastically lowered, with the regime going so far as to create"special diet" battalions such as the 70th Infantry Division for men with severe stomach ailments. Rear-echelon personnel were more often sent to front-line duty wherever possible, especially during the final two years of the war where, inspired by constant propaganda, the oldest and youngest were being recruited and driven by instilled fear and fanaticism to serve on the fronts and, often, to fight to the death, whether judged to be cannon fodder or elite troops.

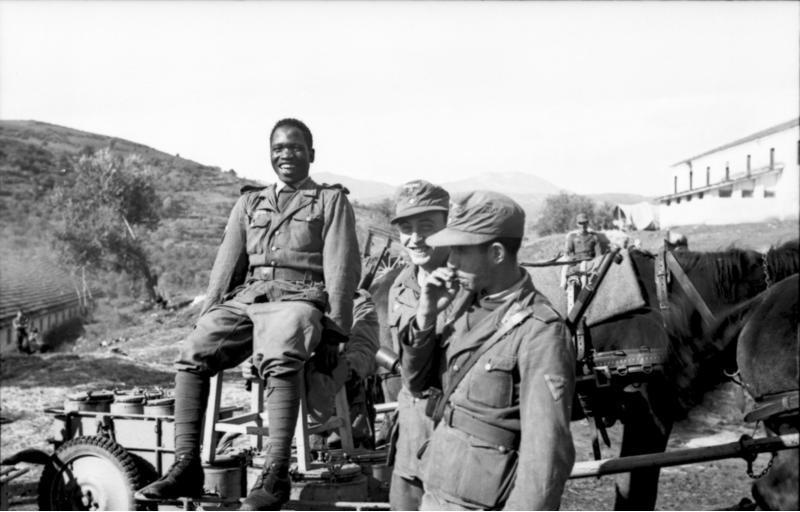
An Afro-Arab soldier of the Free Arabian Legion

Prior to World War II, the Wehrmacht strove to remain a purely ethnic German force; as such, minorities within and outside of Germany, such as the Czechs in annexed Czechoslovakia, were exempted from military service after Hitler's takeover in 1938. Foreign volunteers were generally not accepted in the German armed forces prior to 1941. With the invasion of the Soviet Union in 1941, the government's positions changed. German propagandists wanted to present the war not as a purely German concern, but as a multi-national crusade against the so-called Jewish Bolshevism. Hence, the Wehrmacht and the SS began to seek out recruits from occupied and neutral countries across Europe: the Germanic populations of the Netherlands and Norway were recruited largely into the SS, while "non-Germanic" people were recruited into the Wehrmacht. The "voluntary" nature of such recruitment was often dubious, especially in the later years of the war when even Poles living in the Polish Corridor were declared "ethnic Germans" and drafted.

After Germany's defeat in the Battle of Stalingrad, the Wehrmacht also made substantial use of personnel from the Soviet Union, including the Caucasian Muslim Legion, Turkestan Legion, Crimean Tatars, ethnic Ukrainians and Russians, Cossacks, and others who wished to fight against the Soviet regime or who were otherwise induced to join. Between 15,000 and 20,000 anti-communist White émigrés who had left Russia after the Russian Revolution joined the ranks of the Wehrmacht and Waffen-SS, with 1,500 acting as interpreters and more than 10,000 serving in the guard force of the Russian Protective Corps.

	1939	1940	1941	1942	1943	1944	1945
Heer	3,737,000	4,550,000	5,000,000	5,800,000	6,550,000	6,510,000	5,300,000
Luftwaffe	400,000	1,200,000	1,680,000	1,700,000	1,700,000	1,500,000	1,000,000
Kriegsmarine	50,000	250,000	404,000	580,000	780,000	810,000	700,000
Waffen–SS	35,000	50,000	150,000	230,000	450,000	600,000	830,000
Total	4,220,000	6,050,000	7,234,000	8,310,000	9,480,000	9,420,000	7,830,000

=== Training ===
Germany and the annexed Austria had been divided into 18 military districts (Wehrkreise) from which all men were recruited and trained. The districts were ordered to use the registration lists held by the police to start calling up all men who had reached the age of 20. When recruits joined their regiment for initial training, they often came from the local region and were familiar with some members of their battalion or even the regiment. However, during the first 16 weeks of training, friendships were primarily limited to their immediate comrades. Recruits were assigned rooms based on their section (Korporalschaft), and they were introduced to their section commander, (Gefreiter), who would command their respect and instill discipline during duty. The recruits also encountered their platoon sergeant (a Feldwebel), and their platoon commander during brief appearances early in their training. The officer typically delivered a lecture on the role of the German Army within German society. At this point, recruits were officially prohibited from maintaining any political affiliations. This rule required members of the Nazi Party to form bonds with non-party members, regardless of personal preferences.

The content and intensity of training varied depending on the depot or training facility. Some locations were notorious for extreme discipline, bordering on brutality, while others maintained a less severe but equally thorough approach. Each section was responsible for the cleanliness of its assigned room for the entire 16-week period. Recruits were issued their personal uniforms and equipment, received a strict haircut, and were fed their first military meal at around 6:00 PM. Following this, they attended an ideological lecture about the traditions and ethos of the German army and the history of their regiment. Recruits were instructed on how to properly wear their uniforms and were required to pack their civilian clothes, which would be sent back to their families the next day. From this point onward, they were officially soldiers, subject to military discipline. They were taught military customs, such as saluting indoors and outdoors, and were reminded to show respect to all senior members of the German army, which included almost everyone they encountered in their early training phase.

A typical day of training for recruits began at 5:00 AM, when corporals and soldiers responsible for barracks training would often physically rouse the men from their beds. The recruits were then required to strip their beds, organize their lockers, wash, shave, and dress before breakfast. Many mornings also involved training runs of increasing distance and speed, followed by washing and changing into uniform. Breakfast, consisting of coffee and bread, was scheduled for 6:45 AM, providing the men with about 15 minutes to eat. However, this meal was frequently unavailable, especially if the recruits were engaged in exercises or drills to correct mistakes from the previous day. Recruits quickly learned that hunger, exhaustion, and personal discomfort were considered insignificant and that they had to remain prepared for any situation at all times.

Lectures were a regular part of the daily schedule. These covered topics such as the duties of a soldier toward his comrades, the role of the soldier in relation to the state, and the structure of the Nazi hierarchy. Battle training during lectures was minimal, as the German army placed emphasis on practical instruction in the field. Each training day was divided into morning and afternoon sessions. A typical morning might include a lecture followed by drill practice on the parade square, while the afternoon could feature physical training and shooting practice. When provided, lunch (Mittagessen), the main meal of the day, was served at 12:30 PM. At 1:30 PM, all recruits were assembled on the parade square for inspection and announcements. Initially, this parade was conducted by platoon sergeants. As training progressed, it was led by the company sergeant major, platoon commanders, the company adjutant, and eventually the company commander. Recruits interacted with their officers infrequently during training, as the focus was on preparing them to function independently at the section and platoon levels, without relying on the constant presence of officers who might not be available in battle.

Evenings were dedicated to cleaning duties, which included maintaining uniforms, equipment, rifles, machine guns, and the barracks room. The evening meal (Abendbrot) was served at 6:30 PM. Additional activities often extended the recruits' day well into the night, and as training advanced, nighttime exercises and drills became increasingly common.

The German army divided training into two categories: field training and barracks training. Field training encompassed a range of practical skills essential for survival and combat, such as drill on the parade square, fieldcraft, weapons training, map reading, and other tactical exercises. Barracks training focused on personal hygiene, weapon maintenance, and routine chores like floor polishing, bed making, and other daily housekeeping tasks common to military life. These activities not only instilled discipline but also fostered camaraderie within sections, forging bonds that would endure into combat.

Recruits were provided with all the necessary clothing and equipment to perform their duties, but it was their personal responsibility to ensure everything was kept clean and in good condition. Replacements were issued when necessary, but only for items damaged during training or exercises. Proper care of boots was particularly emphasized, as poorly maintained or ill-fitting footwear could lead to severe foot injuries, which might result in a soldier falling out of formation—a serious matter with potentially harsh consequences. Foot injuries caused by negligence were treated as a disciplinary offence. Every morning, recruits were required to strip their beds to allow them to air, as maintaining hygiene in the barracks was a priority. Beds soaked with sweat needed to dry out before being remade in the early afternoon prior to roll call. Lockers were also subject to inspection and had to be kept tidy, though the German army did not adopt the extreme "spit-and-polish" standards of some other militaries. Cleanliness and order were essential, but soldiers were not expected to achieve a mirror-like shine on boots or millimetre-perfect bed arrangements.

The standard uniform for trainees was white, a colour that quickly became impractical during training. Over time, repeated washing caused the material to fade to a yellow or grey hue. This uniform was completed with ankle boots, a belt, and a side cap. The difficulty in keeping the uniform clean for inspections reinforced the importance of personal accountability for cleanliness and appearance. Recruits were also responsible for their assigned room-cleaning tasks, further instilling discipline. Mistakes or lapses in discipline were met with swift and physically demanding punishments. Unlike some armies, where punishments might include menial tasks such as polishing dustbins or painting grass, the German army treated punishments as additional training opportunities. Common penalties included long runs in full field gear or practical exercises like crawling through muddy terrain, wading through streams, or performing other physically gruelling tasks. These punishments were not only corrective but also reinforced the physical conditioning and endurance required for military life.

Obedience and discipline were further instilled through rigorous foot and rifle drills. Recruits spent many hours on the parade square during their 16-week training period, averaging around 30 drill sessions per week. These included muster parades and pre-meal parades. Rifle drill was not limited to ceremonial handling for parades but also covered tactical aspects, such as loading, unloading, ensuring safety, and cleaning the weapon. This comprehensive approach ensured that recruits developed both the discipline expected of soldiers and the practical skills needed for combat.

=== Officer training ===
After the First World War, officer training in Germany was comprehensively reformed and extended under Hans von Seeckt. Candidates spent almost four years in training, starting with two years in the troops, followed by ten and a half months each at the infantry school and the weapons school. The focus remained on personal development, but more emphasis was placed on academic subjects. The curriculum included tactics, weapons technology, pioneer service, terrain studies, army organization, civic education, air defence, communications, and vehicle technology, theoretical physical education as well as hygiene and military administration. In the weapons school, some theoretical subjects were supplemented by military history and special subjects such as mathematics, physics, and chemistry, with military history being of great importance.

Until 1937, officer training in Germany was divided into three parts: basic training with the troops, officer school, and weapons school, followed by further service, with appointment as an officer taking place after about two years. Instruction at officer school became more practice-oriented, with more hours devoted to tactics and one hour of Nazi principles instead of civic instruction. After the start of the war, training was increasingly replaced by front-line service. Until the end of 1942, officer candidates underwent a combination of training and frontline service, but this had to be adjusted due to high casualties.

From the fall of 1942, proven soldiers without an original officer's career could also become officers on the recommendation of their commanders, whereby criteria such as leadership, personality and military performance were decisive. This made it possible for tens of thousands of non-commissioned officers and enlisted men to become officers during the war. During the course of the Second World War, formal training at the officer school was increasingly replaced by active service at the front. Until the end of 1942, future officers first underwent six months of training with the reserve army. They then served three months at the front, returned to the officer school for three months, served a further two to four months at the front, and were finally appointed officers after a total service period of 14 to 18 months.

==== General staff officer ====
Until the middle of the Second World War, membership of the General Staff was the main route to preferential promotions and the rank of general in the German army. The General Staff was regarded as an exclusive elite with enormous prestige and influence. Before the First World War, selection for the War Academy was based on an annual examination in military and general subjects, with an emphasis on tactics. After 1920, the examination became compulsory for all officers in order to assess knowledge, personality and character. The three-year course at the War Academy aimed to train experts for operations, especially for the position of First General Staff Officer (Ia) of a division. The main subjects were tactics and military history, supplemented by staff work, army organization, enemy intelligence, supply, transport, and weapons technology. Non-military subjects such as foreign languages, foreign and domestic policy, and economics were taught in the third year in Berlin.

The training included lectures, exercises, seminars, independent work, planning, and war games as well as general staff trips to historical battlefields. In the summer, the participants were assigned to various branches of the armed forces to gain practical insights. The highlight was a two-week general staff trip with the simulation and detailed preparation of a major operation, which was also decisive for the final assessment. The selection of the general staff officers was based on intensive personal observation and assessment by the training managers, without a written final examination. Qualities such as intelligence, decision-making ability, creativity, resilience, and reliability were sought. After successfully completing the War Academy, graduates were initially assigned to the General Staff for one to two years on probation before being officially accepted.

The Kriegsakademie was closed at the beginning of the Second World War in 1939, as a short war was expected and general staff officers were in short supply. The three-year course was replaced by eight-week courses, which were strongly practice-oriented and focused on tactics, supplies, transportation, staff work, and enemy intelligence. Character and independent thinking remained key selection criteria, with around 80% of graduates being assessed as suitable. From 1942, as the demand for general staff officers continued to rise, the training was restructured. It comprised six months of practical training in the divisional staff, three months in a higher staff, eight weeks of training, and a further six-month probationary period, which took around 1.5 years in total. As the training often involved front-line operations, there were high casualties among the participants, reflecting the German belief that war itself was the best teacher.

=== Women in the Wehrmacht ===
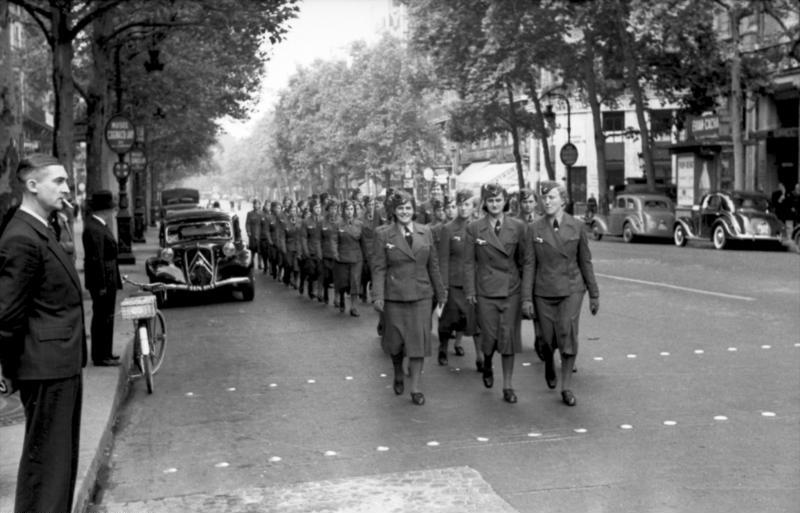
Wehrmachthelferinnen in occupied Paris, 1940

In the beginning, women in Nazi Germany were not involved in the Wehrmacht, as Hitler ideologically opposed conscription for women, stating that Germany would "not form any section of women grenade throwers or any corps of women elite snipers." However, with many men going to the front, women were placed in auxiliary positions within the Wehrmacht, called Wehrmachtshelferinnen (lit. 'Female Wehrmacht Helper'), participating in tasks as:

- telephone, telegraph and transmission operators,
- administrative clerks, typists and messengers,
- operators of listening equipment, in anti-aircraft defence, operating projectors for anti-aircraft defence, employees within meteorology services, and auxiliary civil defence personnel
- volunteer nurses in military health service, as the German Red Cross or other voluntary organizations.

They were placed under the same authority as (Hiwis), auxiliary personnel of the army (German: Behelfspersonal) and they were assigned to duties within the Reich, and to a lesser extent, in the occupied territories, for example in the general government of occupied Poland, in France, and later in Yugoslavia, in Greece and in Romania.

By 1945, 500,000 women were serving as Wehrmachtshelferinnen, half of whom were volunteers, while the other half performed obligatory services connected to the war effort (German: Kriegshilfsdienst).

== Command structure ==
Structure of the Wehrmacht (1935–1938)

Structure of the Wehrmacht (1939–1945)

Legally, the commander-in-chief of the Wehrmacht was Adolf Hitler in his capacity as Germany's head of state, a position he gained after the death of President Paul von Hindenburg in August 1934. With the creation of the Wehrmacht in 1935, Hitler elevated himself to Supreme Commander of the Armed Forces, retaining the position until his suicide on 30 April 1945. The title of Commander-in-Chief was given to the Minister of the Reichswehr Werner von Blomberg, who was simultaneously renamed the Reich Minister of War. Following the Blomberg-Fritsch Affair, Blomberg resigned and Hitler abolished the Ministry of War. As a replacement for the ministry, the Wehrmacht High Command Oberkommando der Wehrmacht (OKW), under Field Marshal Wilhelm Keitel, was put in its place.

Placed under the OKW were the three branch High Commands: Oberkommando des Heeres (OKH), Oberkommando der Marine (OKM), and Oberkommando der Luftwaffe (OKL). The OKW was intended to serve as a joint command and coordinate all military activities, with Hitler at the top. Though many senior officers, such as von Manstein, had advocated for a real tri-service Joint Command, or appointment of a single Joint Chief of Staff, Hitler refused. Even after the defeat at Stalingrad, Hitler refused, stating that Göring as Reichsmarschall and Hitler's deputy, would not submit to someone else or see himself as an equal to other service commanders. However, a more likely reason was Hitler feared it would break his image of having the "Midas touch" concerning military strategy.

With the creation of the OKW, Hitler solidified his control over the Wehrmacht. Showing restraint at the beginning of the war, Hitler also became increasingly involved in military operations at every scale.

Additionally, there was a clear lack of cohesion between the three High Commands and the OKW, as senior generals were unaware of the needs, capabilities and limitations of the other branches. With Hitler serving as Supreme Commander, branch commands were often forced to fight for influence with Hitler. However, influence with Hitler not only came from rank and merit but also who Hitler perceived as loyal, leading to inter-service rivalry, rather than cohesion between his military advisers.

== Branches ==
=== Army ===
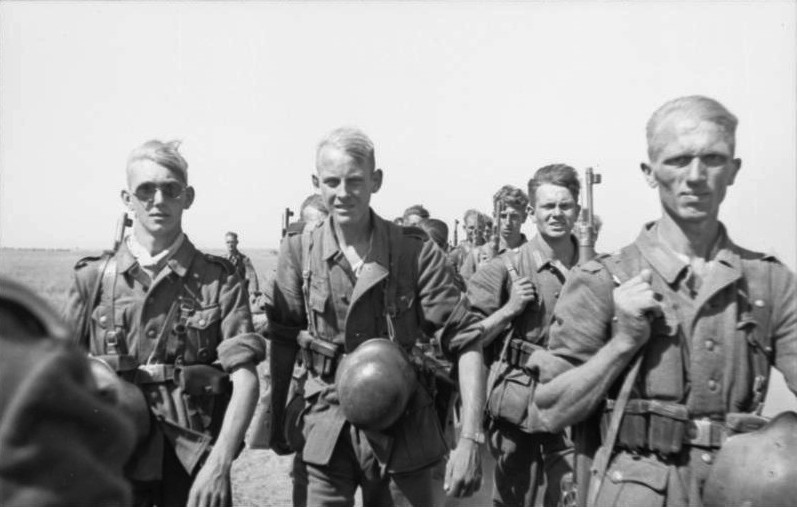
"Foot-mobile" infantry of the Heer, in the Soviet Union 1942

The German Army furthered concepts pioneered during World War I, combining ground (Heer) and air force (Luftwaffe) assets into combined arms teams. Coupled with traditional war fighting methods such as encirclements and the "battle of annihilation", the Wehrmacht managed many lightning quick victories in the first year of World War II, prompting foreign journalists to create a new word for what they witnessed: Blitzkrieg. Germany's immediate military success on the field at the start of the Second World War coincides the favourable beginning they achieved during the First World War, a fact which some attribute to their superior officer corps.

The Heer entered the war with a minority of its formations motorized; infantry remained approximately 90% foot-borne throughout the war, and artillery was primarily horse-drawn. The motorized formations received much attention in the world press in the opening years of the war, and were cited as the reason for the success of the invasions of Poland (September 1939), Denmark and Norway (April 1940), Belgium, France, and Netherlands (May 1940), Yugoslavia and Greece (April 1941) and the early stage of Operation Barbarossa in the Soviet Union (June 1941).

After Hitler declared war on the United States in December 1941, the Axis powers found themselves engaged in campaigns against several major industrial powers while Germany was still in transition to a war economy. German units were then overextended, undersupplied, outmaneuvered, outnumbered and defeated by its enemies in decisive battles during 1941, 1942, and 1943 at the Battle of Moscow, the Siege of Leningrad, Stalingrad, Tunis in North Africa, and the Battle of Kursk.

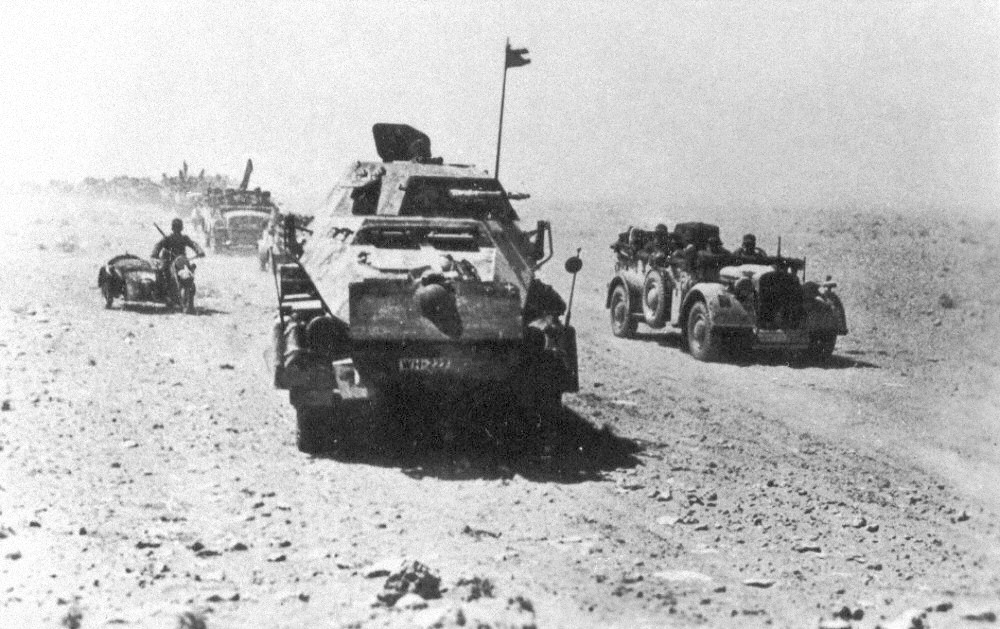
Armoured car of Panzerjäger (anti-tank) battalion, part of the 21 Panzer Division of the Afrika Korps, 1942

The German Army was managed through mission-based tactics (rather than order-based tactics) which was intended to give commanders greater freedom to act on events and exploit opportunities. In public opinion, the German Army was, and sometimes still is, seen as a high-tech army. However, such modern equipment, while featured much in propaganda, was often only available in relatively small numbers. Only 40% to 60% of all units in the Eastern Front were motorized, baggage trains often relied on horse-drawn trailers due to poor roads and weather conditions in the Soviet Union, and for the same reasons many soldiers marched on foot or used bicycles as bicycle infantry. As the fortunes of war turned against them, the Germans were in constant retreat from 1943 and onward.

The Panzer divisions were vital to the German army's early success. In the strategies of the Blitzkrieg, the Wehrmacht combined the mobility of light tanks with airborne assault to quickly progress through weak enemy lines, enabling the German army to quickly take over Poland and France. These tanks were used to break through enemy lines, isolating regiments from the main force so that the infantry behind the tanks could quickly kill or capture the enemy troops.

=== Air Force ===
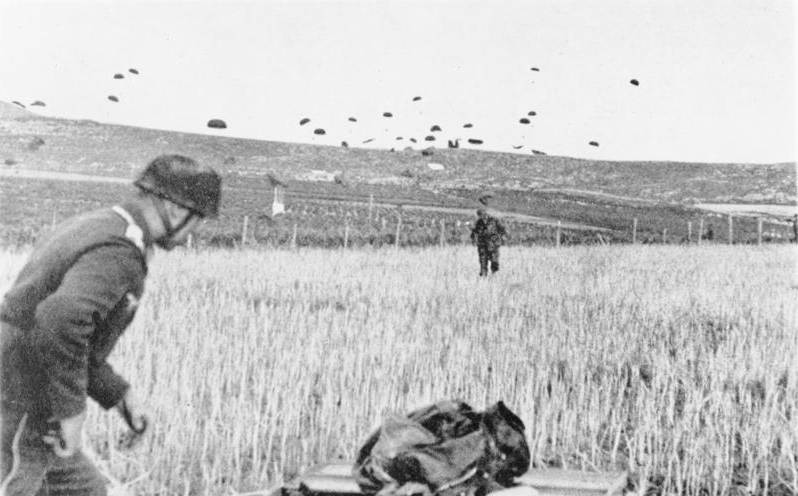
German paratroopers landing on Crete

Originally outlawed by the Treaty of Versailles, the Luftwaffe was officially established in 1935, under the leadership of Hermann Göring. First gaining experience in the Spanish Civil War, it was a key element in the early Blitzkrieg campaigns (Poland, France 1940, USSR 1941). The Luftwaffe concentrated production on fighters and (small) tactical bombers, like the Messerschmitt Bf 109 fighter and the Junkers Ju 87 Stuka dive bomber. The planes cooperated closely with the ground forces. Overwhelming numbers of fighters assured air-supremacy, and the bombers would attack command- and supply-lines, depots, and other support targets close to the front. The Luftwaffe would also be used to transport paratroopers, as first used during Operation Weserübung. Due to the Army's sway with Hitler, the Luftwaffe was often subordinated to the Army, resulting in it being used as a tactical support role and losing its strategic capabilities.

The Western Allies' strategic bombing campaign against German industrial targets (particularly the round-the-clock Combined Bomber Offensive) and Germany's Defence of the Reich deliberately forced the Luftwaffe into a war of attrition. With German fighter force destroyed, the Western Allies had air supremacy over the battlefield, denying support to German forces on the ground and using its own fighter-bombers to attack and disrupt. Following the losses in Operation Bodenplatte in 1945, the Luftwaffe was no longer an effective force.

=== Navy ===
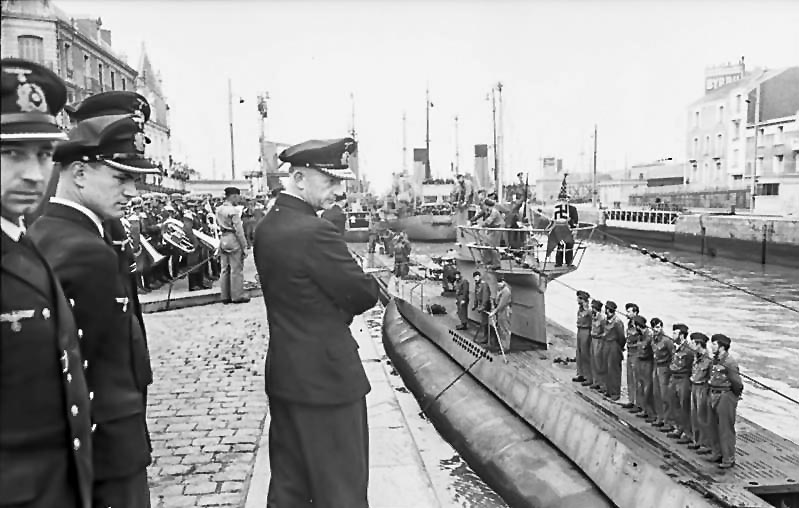
Karl Dönitz inspecting the Saint-Nazaire submarine base in France, June 1941

The Treaty of Versailles disallowed submarines, while limiting the size of the Reichsmarine to six battleships, six cruisers, and twelve destroyers. Following the creation of the Wehrmacht, the navy was renamed the Kriegsmarine.

With the signing of the Anglo-German Naval Agreement, Germany was allowed to increase its navy's size to be 35:100 tonnage of the Royal Navy, and allowed for the construction of U-boats. This was partly done to appease Germany, and because Britain believed the Kriegsmarine would not be able to reach the 35% limit until 1942. The navy was also prioritized last in the German rearmament scheme, making it the smallest of the branches.

In the Battle of the Atlantic, the initially successful German U-boat fleet arm was eventually defeated due to Allied technological innovations like sonar, radar, and the breaking of the Enigma code.

Large surface vessels were few in number due to construction limitations by international treaties prior to 1935. The "pocket battleships" Admiral Graf Spee and Admiral Scheer were important as commerce raiders only in the opening year of the war. No aircraft carrier was operational, as German leadership lost interest in the Graf Zeppelin which had been launched in 1938.

Following the loss of the German battleship Bismarck in 1941, with Allied air-superiority threatening the remaining battle-cruisers in French Atlantic harbours, the ships were ordered to make the Channel Dash back to German ports. Operating from fjords along the coast of Norway, which had been occupied since 1940, convoys from North America to the Soviet port of Murmansk could be intercepted though the Tirpitz spent most of her career as fleet in being. After the appointment of Karl Dönitz as Grand Admiral of the Kriegsmarine (in the aftermath of the Battle of the Barents Sea), Germany stopped constructing battleships and cruisers in favour of U-boats. Though by 1941, the navy had already lost a number of its large surface ships, which could not be replenished during the war.

The Kriegsmarine's most significant contribution to the German war effort was the deployment of its nearly 1,000 U-boats to strike at Allied convoys. The German naval strategy was to attack the convoys in an attempt to prevent the United States from interfering in Europe and to starve out the British. Karl Doenitz, the U-Boat Chief, began unrestricted submarine warfare which cost the Allies 22,898 men and 1,315 ships. The U-boat war remained costly for the Allies until early spring of 1943 when the Allies began to use countermeasures against U-Boats such as the use of Hunter-Killer groups, airborne radar, torpedoes and mines like the FIDO. The submarine war cost the Kriegsmarine 757 U-boats, with more than 30,000 U-boat crewmen killed.

=== Coexistence with the Waffen-SS ===
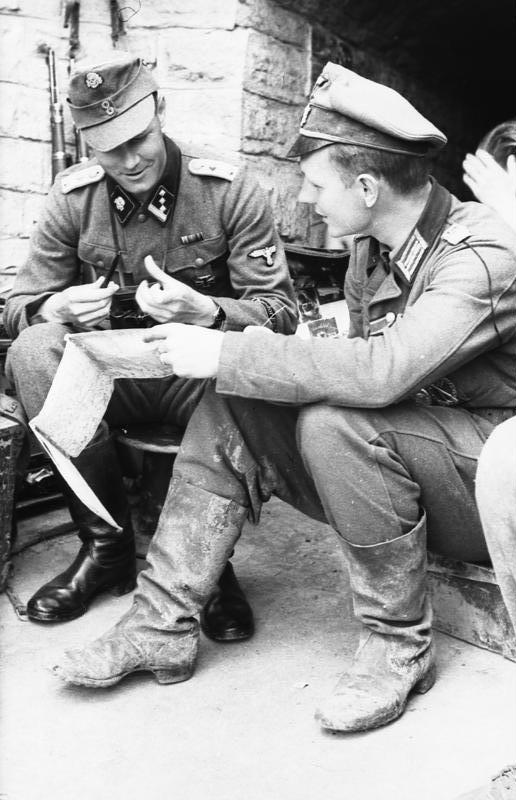
An army Oberleutnant with a SS-Hauptsturmführer from the Waffen-SS in 1944

In the beginning, there was friction between the SS and the army. The army feared the SS would attempt to become a legitimate part of the armed forces of Nazi Germany, and the two groups disagreed about how the limited supply of armaments should be divided. However, on 17 August 1938, Hitler codified the role of the SS and the army in order to end the feud between the two. The arming of the SS was to be "procured from the Wehrmacht upon payment", however "in peacetime, no organizational connection with the Wehrmacht exists." The army was however allowed to check the budget of the SS and inspect the combat readiness of the SS troops. In the event of mobilization, the Waffen-SS field units could be placed under the operational control of the OKW or the OKH. All decisions regarding this would be at Hitler's personal discretion.

Though there existed conflict between the SS and Wehrmacht, many SS officers were former army officers, which ensured continuity and understanding between the two. Throughout the war, army and SS soldiers worked together in various combat situations, creating bonds between the two groups. Guderian noted that every day the war continued the Army and the SS became closer together. Towards the end of the war, army units would even be placed under the command of the SS, in Italy and the Netherlands. The relationship between the Wehrmacht and the SS improved; however, the Waffen-SS was never considered "the fourth branch of the Wehrmacht."

== Theatres and campaigns ==
The Wehrmacht directed combat operations during World War II (from 1 September 1939 – 8 May 1945) as the German Reich's armed forces umbrella command-organization. After 1941 the OKH became the de facto Eastern Theatre higher-echelon command-organization for the Wehrmacht, excluding Waffen-SS except for operational and tactical combat purposes. The OKW conducted operations in the Western Theatre. The operations by the Kriegsmarine in the North and Mid-Atlantic can also be considered as separate theatres, considering the size of the area of operations and their remoteness from other theatres.

The Wehrmacht fought on other fronts, sometimes three simultaneously; redeploying troops from the intensifying theatre in the East to the West after the Normandy landings caused tensions between the General Staffs of both the OKW and the OKH – as Germany lacked sufficient materiel and manpower for a two-front war of such magnitude.

=== Eastern theatre ===
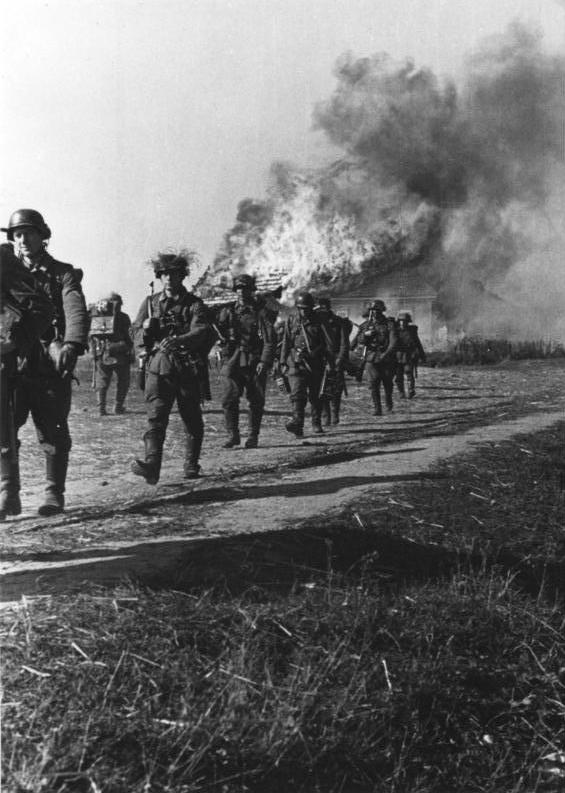
German troops in the Soviet Union, October 1941

Major campaigns and battles in Eastern and Central Europe included:

- Czechoslovak campaign (1938–1945)
- Invasion of Poland (Fall Weiss) (1939)
- Operation Barbarossa (1941), conducted by Army Group North, Army Group Centre, and Army Group South
- Battle of Moscow (1941)
- Battles of Rzhev (1942–1943)
- Battle of Stalingrad (1942–1943)
- Battle of the Caucasus (1942–1943)
- Battle of Kursk (Operation Citadel) (1943)
- Battle of Kiev (1943)
- Operation Bagration (1944)
- Nazi security warfare – largely carried out by security divisions of the Wehrmacht, Order Police and Waffen-SS units in the occupied territories behind Axis frontlines.

=== Western theatre ===
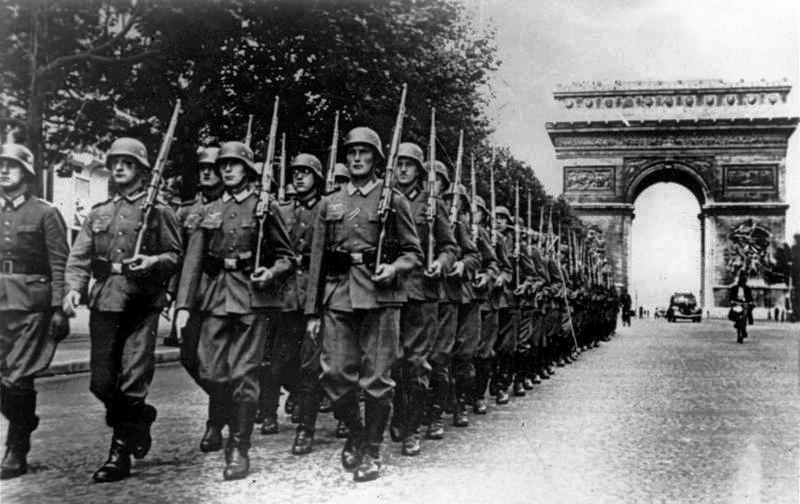
German soldiers in occupied Paris

- Phoney War (Sitzkrieg, September 1939 to May 1940) between the invasion of Poland and the Battle of France
- Operation Weserübung
  - German invasion of Denmark – 9 April 1940
  - The Norwegian Campaign – 9 April to 10 June 1940
- Fall Gelb
  - Battle of Belgium 10 to 28 May 1940
  - German invasion of Luxembourg 10 May 1940
  - Battle of the Netherlands – 10 to 17 May 1940
  - Battle of France – 10 May to 25 June 1940
- Battle of Britain (1940)
- Battle of the Atlantic (1939–1945)
- Battle of Normandy (1944)
- Allied invasion of southern France (1944)
- Ardennes Offensive (1944–1945)
- Defense of the Reich air-campaign, 1939 to 1945

=== Mediterranean theatre ===
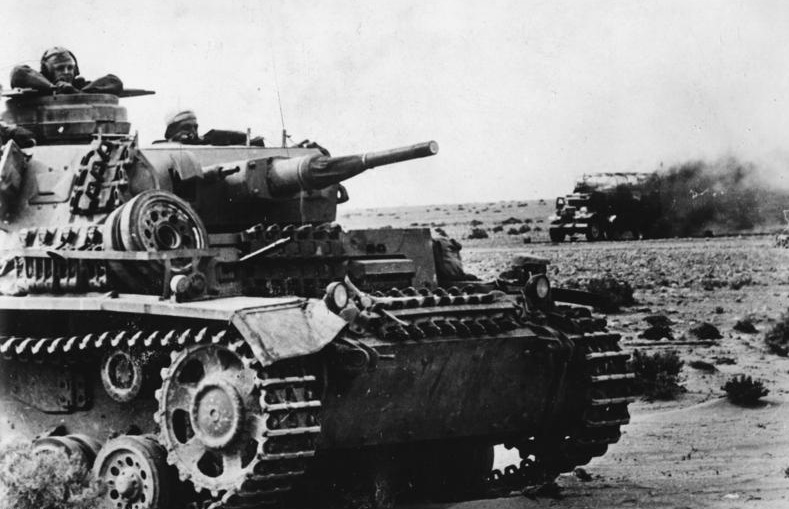
German tanks during a counter-attack in North Africa, 1942

For a time, the Axis Mediterranean Theatre and the North African Campaign were conducted as a joint campaign with the Italian Army, and may be considered a separate theatre.

- Invasion of the Balkans and Greece (Operation Marita) (1940–1941)
- Battle of Crete (1941)
- The North African Campaign in Libya, Tunisia and Egypt between the UK and Commonwealth (and later, U.S.) forces and the Axis forces
- The Italian Theatre was a continuation of the Axis defeat in North Africa, and was a campaign for defence of Italy

== Casualties ==
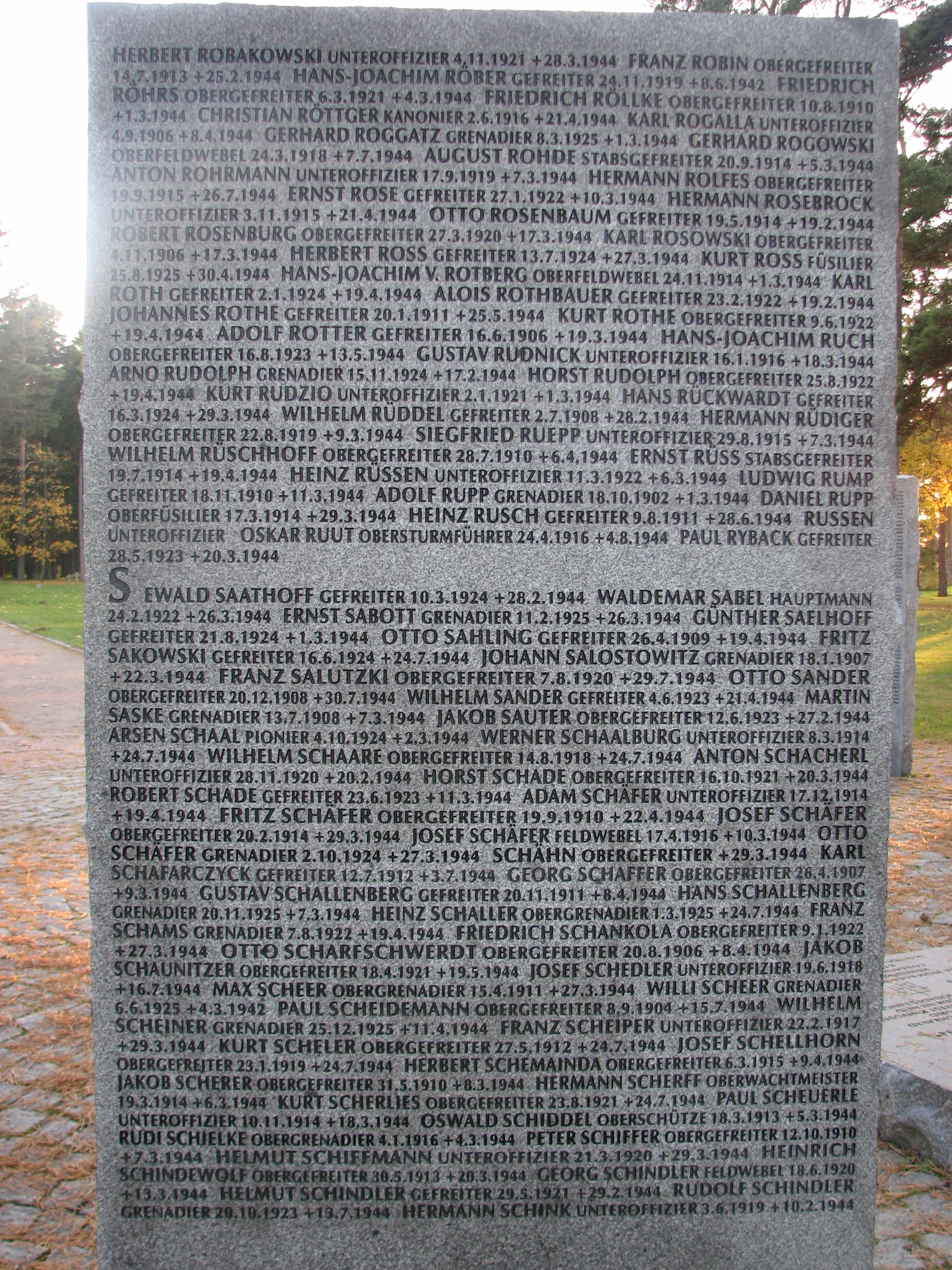
A German war cemetery in Estonia

More than 6,000,000 soldiers were wounded during the conflict, while more than 11,000,000 became prisoners. In all, approximately 5,318,000 soldiers from Germany and other nationalities fighting for the German armed forces—including the Waffen-SS, Volkssturm and foreign collaborationist units—are estimated to have been killed in action, died of wounds, died in custody or gone missing in World War II. Included in this number are 215,000 Soviet citizens conscripted by Germany.

According to Frank Biess,

German casualties took a sudden jump with the defeat of the Sixth Army at Stalingrad in January 1943, when 180,310 soldiers were killed in one month. Among the 5.3 million Wehrmacht casualties during the Second World War, more than 80 per cent died during the last two years of the war. Approximately three-quarters of these losses occurred on the Eastern front (2.7 million) and during the final stages of the war between January and May 1945 (1.2 million).

Jeffrey Herf wrote that:

Whereas German deaths between 1941 and 1943 on the western front had not exceeded three per cent of the total from all fronts, in 1944 the figure jumped to about 14 per cent. Yet even in the months following D-day, about 68.5 per cent of all German battlefield deaths occurred on the eastern front, as a Soviet blitzkrieg in response devastated the retreating Wehrmacht.

In addition to the losses, at the hands of the elements and enemy fighting, at least 20,000 soldiers were executed as sentences by the military court. In comparison, the Red Army executed 135,000, (Note: 135,000 executed; 422,700 sent to penal units at the front and 436,600 imprisoned after sentencing.) France 102, the US 146 and the UK 40.

== War crimes ==
Nazi propaganda had told Wehrmacht soldiers to wipe out what were variously called Jewish Bolshevik subhumans, the Mongol hordes, the Asiatic flood and the red beast. While the principal perpetrators of the civil suppression behind the front lines amongst German armed forces were the Nazi German "political" armies (the SS-Totenkopfverbände, the Waffen-SS, and the Einsatzgruppen, which were responsible for mass-murders, primarily by implementation of the so-called Final Solution of the Jewish Question in occupied territories), the traditional armed forces represented by the Wehrmacht committed and ordered war crimes of their own (e.g. the Commissar Order), particularly during the invasion of Poland in 1939 and later in the war against the Soviet Union.

=== Cooperation with the SS ===
Prior to the outbreak of war, Hitler informed senior Wehrmacht officers that actions "which would not be in the taste of German generals", would take place in occupied areas and ordered them that they "should not interfere in such matters but restrict themselves to their military duties". Some Wehrmacht officers initially showed a strong dislike for the SS and objected to the army committing war crimes with the SS, though these objections were not against the idea of the atrocities themselves. Later during the war, relations between the SS and Wehrmacht improved significantly. The common soldier had no qualms with the SS, and often assisted them in rounding up civilians for executions.

The Army's Chief of Staff General Franz Halder in a directive declared that in the event of guerrilla attacks, German troops were to impose "collective measures of force" by massacring entire villages. Cooperation between the SS Einsatzgruppen and the Wehrmacht involved supplying the death squads with weapons, ammunition, equipment, transport, and even housing. Partisan fighters, Jews, and Communists became synonymous enemies of the Nazi regime and were hunted down and exterminated by the Einsatzgruppen and Wehrmacht alike, something revealed in numerous field journal entries from German soldiers. With the implementation of the Hunger Plan, hundreds of thousands, perhaps millions, of Soviet civilians were deliberately starved to death, as the Germans seized food for their armies and fodder for their draft horses. According to Thomas Kühne: "an estimated 300,000–500,000 people were killed during the Wehrmacht's Nazi security warfare in the Soviet Union."

While secretly listening to conversations of captured German generals, British officials became aware that the German Army had taken part in the atrocities and mass-murder of Jews and were guilty of war crimes. American officials learned of the Wehrmacht's atrocities in much the same way. Taped conversations of soldiers detained as POWs revealed how some of them voluntarily participated in mass executions.

=== Crimes against civilians ===
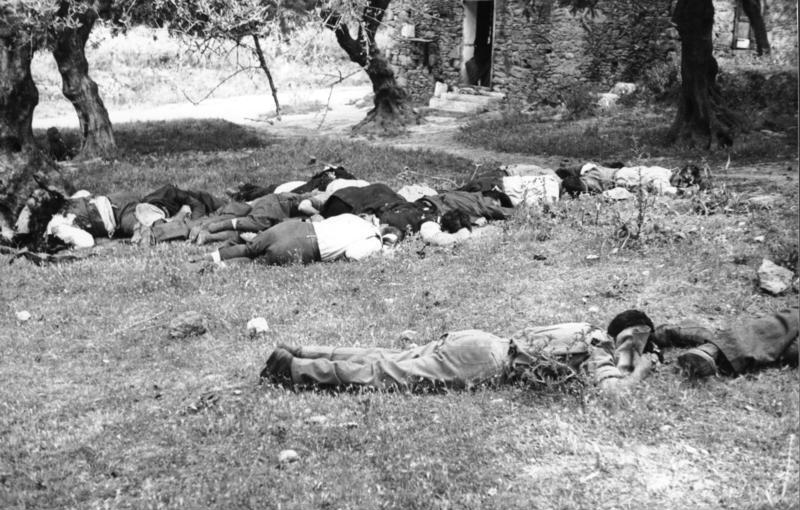
Civilians executed by German paratroopers in Kondomari

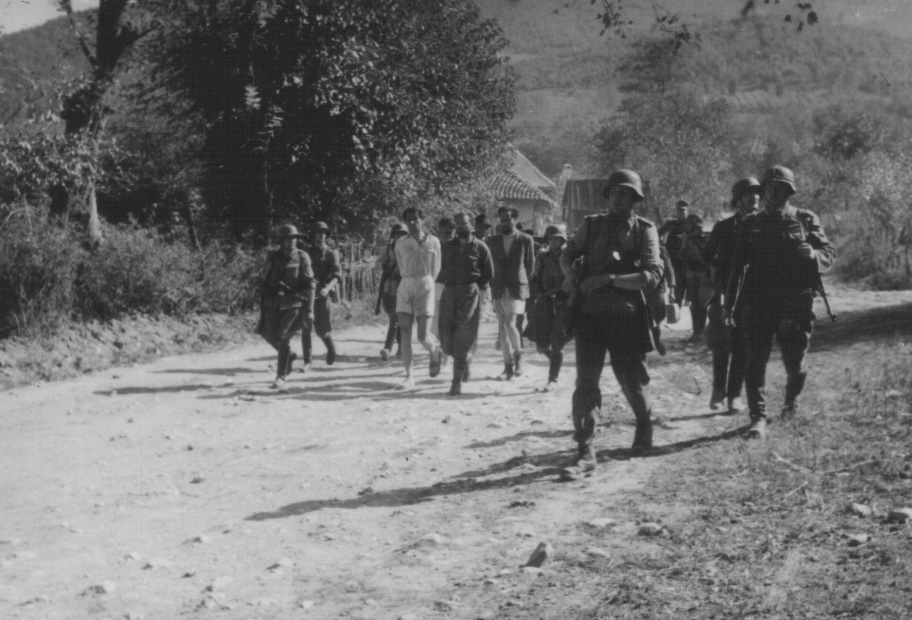
German troops marching civilians to execution

During the war, the Wehrmacht committed numerous war crimes against the civilian population in occupied countries. This includes massacres of civilians and running forced brothels in occupied areas.

Massacres would in many cases come as reprisals for acts of resistance. With these reprisals, the Wehrmacht's response would vary in severity and method, depending on the scale of resistance and whether it was in East or West Europe. Often, the number of hostages to be shot was calculated based on a ratio of 100 hostages executed for every German soldier killed and 50 hostages executed for every German soldier wounded. Other times civilians would be rounded up and shot with machine guns.

To combat German officials' fear of venereal disease and masturbation, the Wehrmacht established numerous brothels throughout Nazi Germany and its occupied territories. Women would often be kidnapped off the streets and forced to work in the brothels, with an estimated minimum of 34,140 women being forced to serve as prostitutes.

=== Crimes against POWs ===
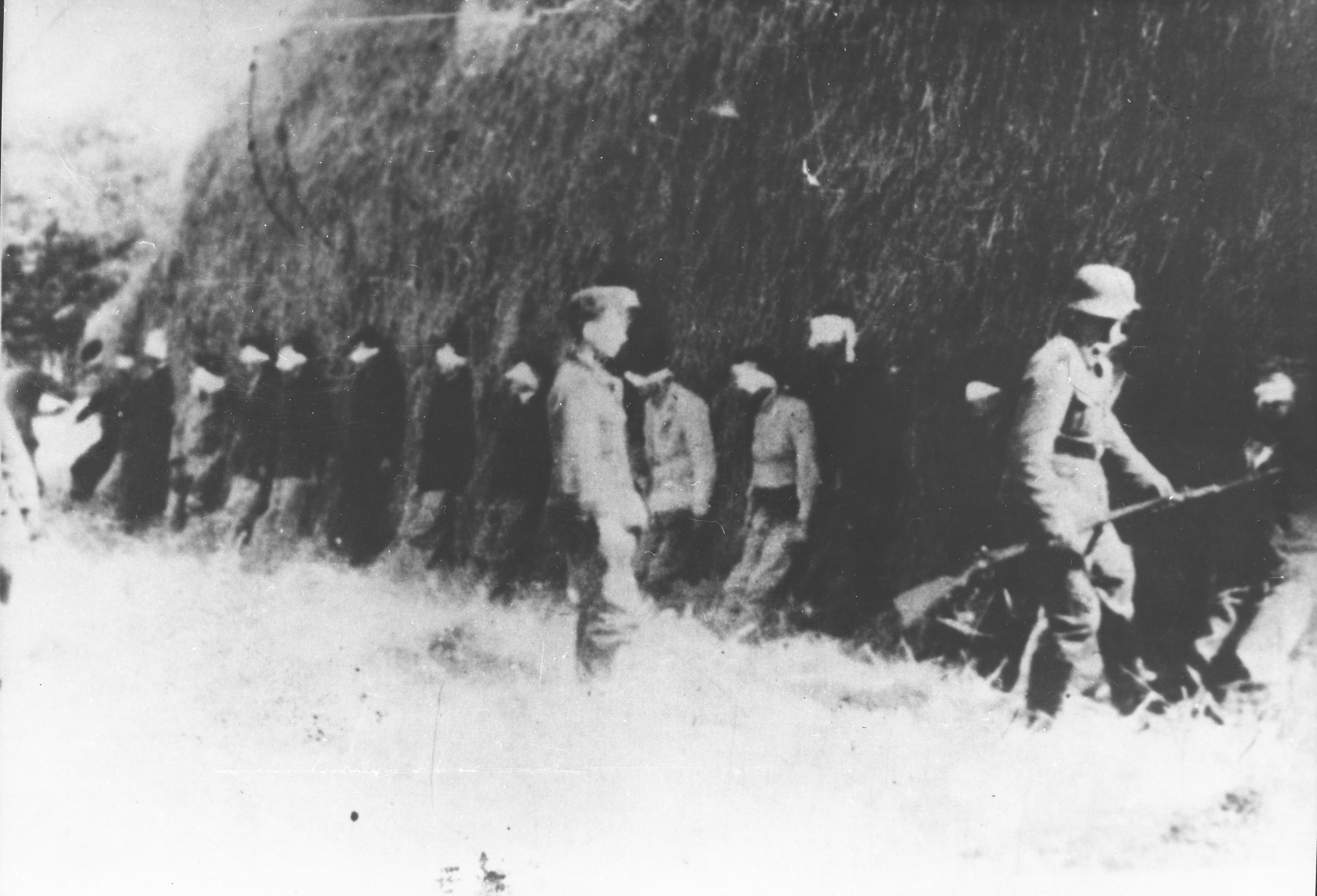
Sixteen blindfolded Yugoslav Partisan youth awaiting execution by German forces in Serbia, 20 August 1941

While the Wehrmacht's prisoner-of-war camps for inmates from the west generally satisfied the humanitarian requirement prescribed by international law, prisoners from Poland and the USSR were incarcerated under significantly worse conditions. Between the launching of Operation Barbarossa in the summer of 1941 and the following spring, 2.8 million of the 3.2 million Soviet prisoners taken died while in German hands.

=== Criminality ===
Among German historians, the view that the Wehrmacht had participated in wartime atrocities, particularly on the Eastern Front, grew in the late 1970s and the 1980s. In the 1990s, public conception in Germany was influenced by controversial reactions and debates about the exhibition of war crime issues.

Holocaust historian Omer Bartov, wrote in 2003 that the complicity of the Wehrmacht in genocide is well-supported by a mass of scholarship. Bartov argues that postwar portrayals of the Wehrmacht as professionally minded and ideologically indifferent distorted the reality that soldiers deeply influenced by Nazi propaganda and indoctrination, often using Nazi vocabulary in their private writings. The historian Ben H. Shepherd writes that "There is now clear agreement amongst historians that the German Wehrmacht, as an institution at any rate, identified strongly with National Socialism and embroiled itself in the criminality of the Third Reich."

Historian Richard J. Evans writes that the Wehrmacht, "as a matter of policy", employed systematic violence against civilians that caused the death of millions. Mass killings, forced evacuations and the destruction of villages were done in the name of fighting partisans. Living off the land meant the seizure of food and livestock, which devastated agriculture and left many occupied populations without supplies. During the retreat from the Soviet Union after Stalingrad, the German Army employed a scorched-earth policy, destroying settlements, crops, livestock, and machinery while driving civilians into the "desert zone" in front of the advancing Red Army, where many died. British historian Ian Kershaw concludes that the Wehrmacht's duty was to ensure that the people who met Hitler's requirements of being part of the Aryan Herrenvolk ("Aryan master race") had living space. He wrote that:

The Nazi revolution was broader than just the Holocaust. Its second goal was to eliminate Slavs from central and eastern Europe and to create a Lebensraum for Aryans. ... As Bartov (The Eastern Front; Hitler's Army) shows, it barbarised the German armies on the eastern front. Most of their three million men, from generals to ordinary soldiers, helped exterminate captured Slav soldiers and civilians. This was sometimes cold and deliberate murder of individuals (as with Jews), sometimes generalised brutality and neglect. No less than 58 per cent of Russian POWs held by Germany died, compared to a tiny 4 per cent of Anglo-American POWs! German soldiers' letters and memoirs reveal their terrible reasoning: Slavs were 'the Asiatic-Bolshevik' horde, an inferior but threatening race.

Several high-ranking Wehrmacht officers, including Hermann Hoth, Georg von Küchler, Georg-Hans Reinhardt, Karl von Roques, Walter Warlimont and others, were convicted of war crimes and crimes against humanity at the High Command Trial given sentences ranging from time served to life.

== Resistance to the Nazi regime ==
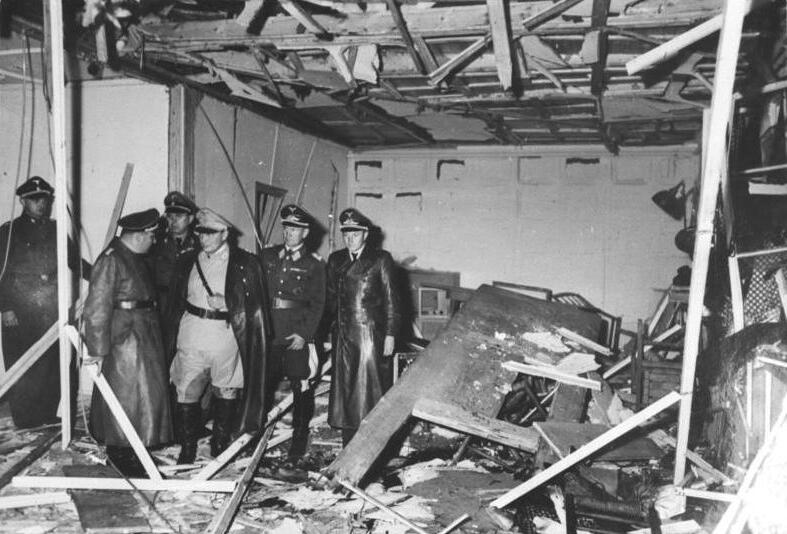
Martin Bormann, Hermann Göring, and Bruno Loerzer surveying the damage made by 20 July plot

Originally, there was little resistance within the Wehrmacht, as Hitler actively went against the Treaty of Versailles and attempted to recover the army's honor. The first major resistance began in 1938 with the Oster conspiracy, where several members of the military wanted to remove Hitler from power, as they feared a war with Czechoslovakia would ruin Germany. However, following the success of the early campaigns in Poland, Scandinavia and France, belief in Hitler was restored. With the defeat in Stalingrad, trust in Hitler's leadership began to wane. This caused an increase in resistance within the military. The resistance culminated in the 20 July plot (1944), when a group of officers led by Claus von Stauffenberg attempted to assassinate Hitler. The attempt failed, resulting in the execution of 4,980 people and the standard military salute being replaced with the Hitler salute.

Some members of the Wehrmacht did save Jews and non-Jews from the concentration camps and/or mass murder. Anton Schmid – a sergeant in the army – helped between 250 and 300 Jewish men, women, and children escape from the Vilna Ghetto in Lithuania. He was court-martialed and executed as a consequence. Albert Battel, a reserve officer stationed near the Przemysl ghetto, blocked an SS detachment from entering it. He then evacuated up to 100 Jews and their families to the barracks of the local military command, and placed them under his protection. Wilm Hosenfeld – an army captain in Warsaw – helped, hid, or rescued several Poles, including Jews, in occupied Poland. He helped the Polish-Jewish composer Władysław Szpilman, who was hiding among the city's ruins, by supplying him with food and water.

According to Wolfram Wette, only three Wehrmacht soldiers are known for being executed for rescuing Jews: Anton Schmid, Friedrich Rath and Friedrich Winking.

== After World War II ==
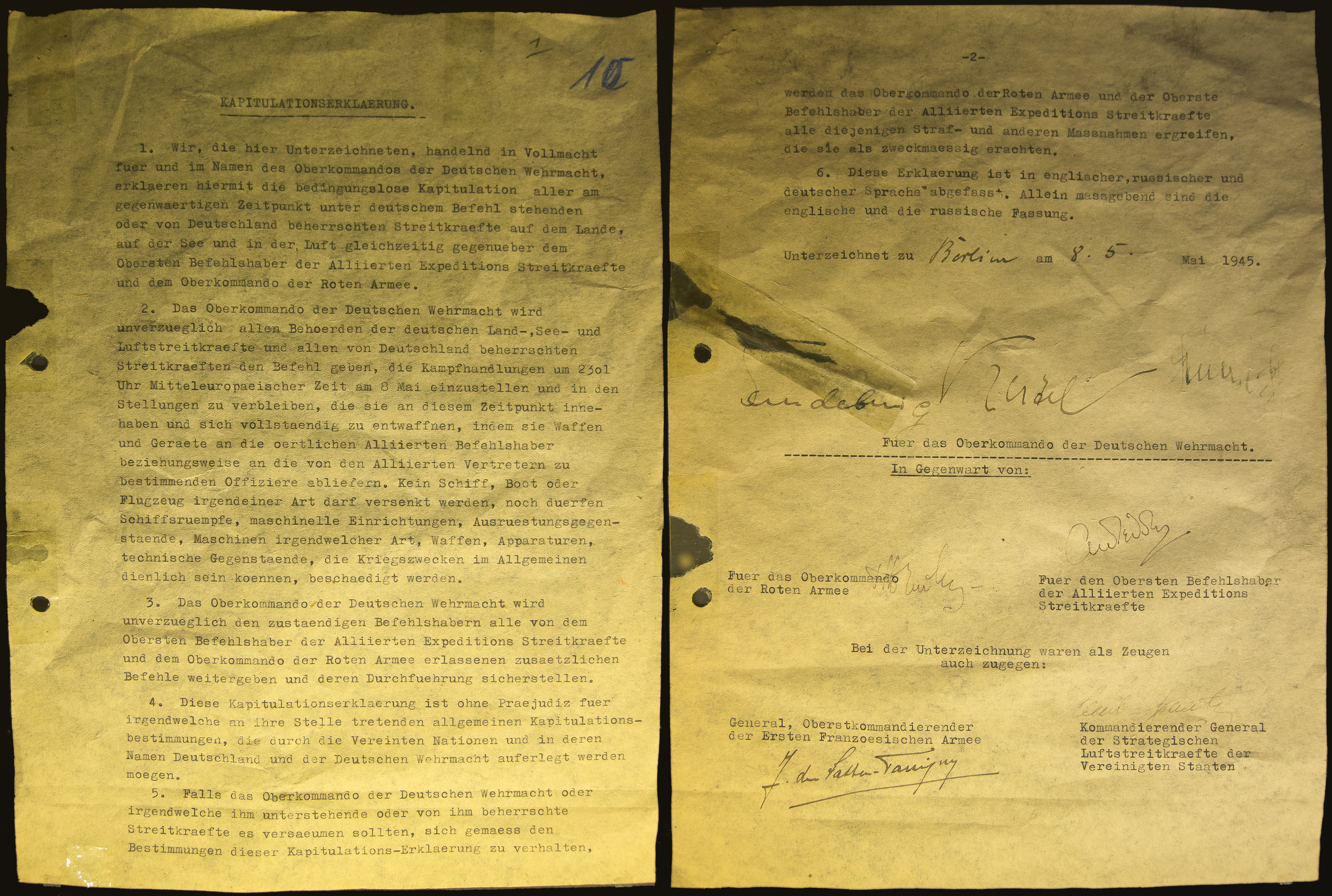
German Instrument of Surrender, 8 May 1945 – Berlin-Karlshorst

Following the unconditional surrender of the Wehrmacht, which went into effect on 8 May 1945, some Wehrmacht units remained active, either independently (e.g. in Norway), or under Allied command as police forces. The last Wehrmacht unit to come under Allied control was an isolated weather station in Svalbard, which formally surrendered to a Norwegian relief ship on 4 September.

On 20 September 1945, with Proclamation No. 2 of the Allied Control Council (ACC), "[a]ll German land, naval and air forces, the S.S., S.A., S.D. and Gestapo, with all their organizations, staffs and institution, including the General Staff, the Officers' corps, the Reserve Corps, military schools, war veterans' organizations, and all other military and quasi-military organizations, together with all clubs and associations which serve to keep alive the military tradition in Germany, shall be completely and finally abolished in accordance with the methods and procedures to be laid down by the Allied Representatives." The Wehrmacht was officially dissolved by the ACC Law 34 on 20 August 1946, which proclaimed the OKW, OKH, the Ministry of Aviation and the OKM to be "disbanded, completely liquidated and declared illegal".

=== Military operational legacy ===
Immediately following the end of the war, many were quick to dismiss the Wehrmacht due to its failures and claim allied superiority. However, historians have since reevaluated the Wehrmacht in terms of fighting power and tactics, giving it a more favourable assessment, with some calling it one of the best in the world, partly due to its ability to regularly inflict higher losses than it received, while it fought outnumbered and outgunned.

Israeli military historian Martin van Creveld, who attempted to examine the military force of the Wehrmacht in a purely military context, concluded: "The German army was a superb fighting organization. In point of morale, elan, troop cohesion and resilience, it probably had no equal among twentieth century armies." German historian Rolf-Dieter Müller comes to the following conclusion: "In the purely military sense [...] you can indeed say that the impression of a superior fighting force rightly exists. The proverbial efficiency was even greater than previously thought, because the superiority of the opponent was much higher than at that time German officers suspected. The analysis of Russian archive files finally gives us a clear picture in this regard." Strategic thinker and professor Colin S. Gray believed that the Wehrmacht possessed outstanding tactical and operational capabilities. However, following a number of successful campaigns, German policy began to have victory disease, asking the Wehrmacht to do the impossible. The continued use of the Blitzkrieg also led to Soviets learning the tactic and using it against the Wehrmacht.

=== Historical negationism ===
Soon after the war ended, former Wehrmacht officers, veterans' groups and various far-right authors began to state that the Wehrmacht was an apolitical organization which was largely innocent of Nazi Germany's war crimes and crimes against humanity. Attempting to benefit from the clean Wehrmacht myth, veterans of the Waffen-SS declared that the organisation had virtually been a branch of the Wehrmacht and therefore had fought as "honourably" as it. Its veterans organisation, HIAG, attempted to cultivate a myth of their soldiers having been "Soldiers like any other".

=== Post-war militaries ===
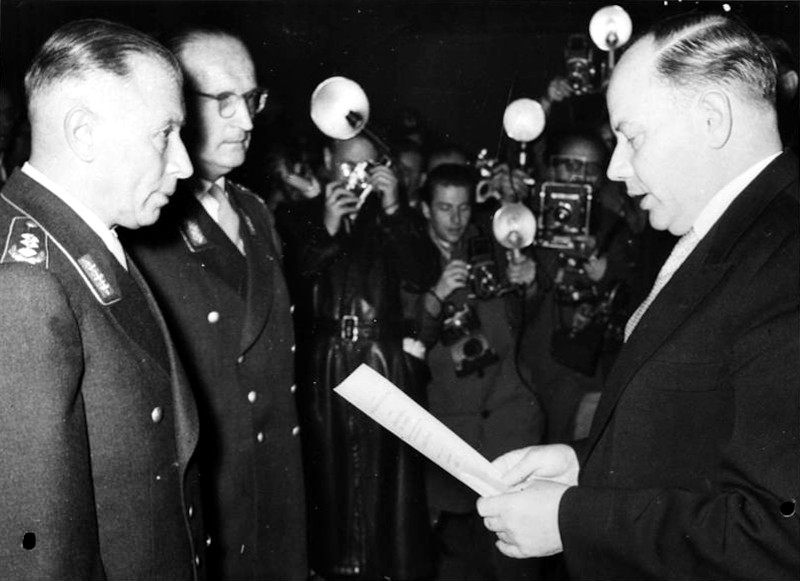
Former Wehrmacht generals Adolf Heusinger and Hans Speidel being sworn into the newly founded Bundeswehr on 12 November 1955

Following the division of Germany, many former Wehrmacht and SS officers in West Germany feared a Soviet invasion of the country. To combat this, several prominent officers created a secret army, unknown to the general public and without mandate from the Allied Control Authority or the West German government.

By the mid-1950s, tensions of the Cold War led to the creation of separate military forces in the Federal Republic of Germany and the German Democratic Republic. The West German military, officially created on 5 May 1955, took the name Bundeswehr (lit. 'Federal Defence'). Its East German counterpart—created on 1 March 1956—took the name National People's Army (German: Nationale Volksarmee). Both organizations employed many former Wehrmacht members, particularly in their formative years, though neither organization considered themselves successors to the Wehrmacht. However, according to historian Hannes Heer "Germans still have a hard time, when it comes to openly dealing with their Nazi past", as such of the 50 military bases named after Wehrmacht soldiers, only 16 bases have changed names.

Wehrmacht veterans in West Germany have received pensions through the War Victims' Assistance Act (German: Bundesversorgungsgesetz) from the government. According to The Times of Israel, "The benefits come through the Federal Pension Act, which was passed in 1950 to support war victims, whether civilians or veterans of the Wehrmacht or Waffen-SS."

== See also ==
- Bribery of senior Wehrmacht officers
- German resistance to Nazism
- Glossary of German military terms
- Glossary of Nazi Germany
- Nazism and the Wehrmacht
- Wehrmacht Propaganda Troops
