= Ben H. Shepherd =

British historian and author (born 1970)

- Occupations: Historian; author

Academic background
- Education: University of Birmingham (PhD)

Academic work
- Era: 20th century
- Institutions: Glasgow Caledonian University
- Main interests: Modern European history; military history
- Website: Official website

Ben H. Shepherd (born 1970) is a British historian and author who specialises in German military history of World War II. He has authored several books on the German Army of 1935–1945. Shepherd holds the position of reader in history at the Glasgow Caledonian University.

In 2016 he wrote Hitler's Soldiers: The German Army in the Third Reich, published by Yale University Press. The historian Robert M. Citino describes it as a "rich and satisfying book" due to its focus on the operational history of the German Army, as well as on its ideological and criminal aspects. One of Shepherd's prior works, War in the Wild East, focused on the German security warfare on the Eastern Front (World War II).

== Publications ==
- Shepherd, Ben H. (2004). War in the Wild East: The German Army and Soviet Partisans. Cambridge, Massachusetts: Harvard University Press. ISBN 0674043553.
- Shepherd, Ben H. (2012). Terror in the Balkans: German Armies and Partisan Warfare. Cambridge: Harvard University Press. ISBN 978-0-674-04891-1.
- Shepherd, Ben H. (2016). Hitler's Soldiers: The German Army in the Third Reich. Yale University Press. ISBN 9780300179033.
