= Police Battalion 45 =

- Polizeibattalion 45
- Active: 1941–
- Country: Nazi Germany
- Role: Nazi security warfare Participation in the Holocaust
- Size: Battalion
- Part of: Order Police under SS command

The Police Battalion 45 (Polizeibattalion 45) was a formation of the German Order Police (uniformed police) during the Nazi era. During Operation Barbarossa, it was subordinated to the SS and deployed in German-occupied areas, specifically the Army Group Centre Rear Area, of the Soviet Union, as part of Police Regiment South. Alongside detachments from the Einsatzgruppen of the SD and the 1st SS Infantry Brigade of the Waffen-SS, it perpetrated mass murder in the Holocaust and was responsible for large-scale crimes against humanity targeting civilian populations.

== Background and formation ==
The German Order Police (uniformed police) was a key instrument of the security apparatus of Nazi Germany. During the prewar period, SS chief Heinrich Himmler and Kurt Daluege, chief of the Order Police, cooperated in transforming the police force of the Weimar Republic into militarised formations ready to serve the regime's aims of conquest and racial annihilation. Police troops were first formed into Order Police battalions for the 1939 invasion of Poland, where they were deployed for security and policing purposes, also taking part in executions and mass deportations.

Twenty-three Order Police battalions were slated to take part in the 1941 invasion of the Soviet Union, known as Operation Barbarossa. Nine were attached to security divisions of the Wehrmacht. Two battalions were assigned to support the Einsatzgruppen, the mobile death squads of the SD, and Organisation Todt, the military construction group. Twelve were formed into regiments, three battalions each, and designated as Police Regiments Centre, North, South, and Special Purpose. The goals of the police battalions were to secure the rear by eliminating the remnants of the enemy forces, guarding the prisoners of war, and protecting the lines of communications and captured industrial facilities. Their instructions also included, as Daluege stated, the "combat of criminal elements, above all political elements".

Along with Police Battalions 303 and 314, Police Battalion 45 was assigned to Police Regiment South. The regiment was placed under the command of Hermann Franz, a career policeman who had previously served in the Order Police in occupied Poland. When the regiment crossed the German-Soviet border, it came under the control of Friedrich Jeckeln, the Higher SS and Police Leader (HSS-PF) for Army Group South in Ukraine.

== Operational history ==
The actions of Police Battalion 45 quickly escalated to genocide while in the occupied Soviet Union. The regiment began executing Jewish women and children in July 1941. Police Battalion 45 murdered the entire Jewish population of Shepetovka while stationed there between 26 July and 1 August. The orders came down from the regimental commander, who had referred to an order from Heinrich Himmler.

During the summer months, the battalion took part in joint actions with the 1st SS Infantry Brigade of the Waffen-SS, both providing support and undertaking independent killings. The brigade's report of 19 August to the Command Staff Reichsführer-SS (SS operational staff set up for the invasion) noted that Police Battalions 45 and 303 and the brigade jointly participated in "combat of gangs". The 22 August report noted that the battalion shot three "partisan women", 19 "bandits", and 537 Jews.

In September, Police Battalion 45 participated in the murder of Jews in Berdichev, cordoning off the execution site and leading the victims to the pits where they were shot by Jeckeln's staff company. About 16,000 Jews were killed. During the massacre at Babi Yar, the battalion cordoned off the area, while Sondercommando 4a and a platoon of Waffen-SS troops did the shooting. Police Battalions 303 and 314 participated in the massacre, as well.

The killing activities of both the Einsatzgruppen detachments and the Police Regiment South slowed down the farther the Wehrmacht advanced, as more Jews were able to escape east and the density of the pre-war Jewish population was lower in Eastern Ukraine. Nonetheless, the murder operations continued, targeting Jews, communists, and "suspicious elements". In July 1942, Police Regiment South, with its constituent battalions, was redesignated as the 10th Police Regiment.

== Aftermath ==
The Order Police as a whole had not been declared a criminal organisation by the Allies, unlike the SS. Its members were able to reintegrate into society largely unmolested, with many returning to police careers.

== Bibliography ==
- Brandon, Ray & Lower, Wendy (2008). The Shoah in Ukraine: History, Testimony, Memorialization. Indiana University Press. ISBN 978-0-253-35084-8.
- Breitman, Richard (1998). Official Secrets: What the Nazis Planned, What the British and Americans Knew. New York: Hill and Wang/Farrar Straus & Giroux. p. 46. ISBN 9780809038190. "police regiment center."
- Longerich, Peter (2010). Holocaust: The Nazi Persecution and Murder of the Jews. Oxford; New York: Oxford University Press. ISBN 978-0-19-280436-5.
- Persico, Joseph E. (22 October 2002). Roosevelt's Secret War: FDR and World War II Espionage. Random House. ISBN 0-3757-6126-8.
- Showalter, Dennis (2005). "Foreword". Hitler's Police Battalions: Enforcing Racial War in the East. Kansas City: University Press of Kansas. ISBN 978-0-7006-1724-1.
- Smith, Michael (2004). "Bletchley Park and the Holocaust". In Scott, L. V.; Jackson, P. D. (eds.). Understanding Intelligence in the Twenty-First Century: Journeys in Shadows. ISBN 0714655333.
- Tessin, Georg & Kannapin, Norbert (2000). Waffen-SS und Ordnungspolizei im Kriegseinsatz 1939 - 1945: ein Überblick anhand der Feldpostübersicht. Osnabrück: Biblio-Verlag. ISBN 3-7648-2471-9.
- Westermann, Edward B. (2005). Hitler's Police Battalions: Enforcing Racial War in the East. Kansas City: University Press of Kansas. ISBN 978-0-7006-1724-1.
