= Police Battalion 309 =

- Polizei-Battalion 309
- Active: 1941–45
- Country: Nazi Germany
- Role: Nazi security warfare Participation in the Holocaust
- Size: Battalion
- Part of: Order Police battalions under German Army (Wehrmacht) command

The Police Battalion 309 (Polizeibataillon 309) was a formation of the Order Police (uniformed police) during the Nazi era. During Operation Barbarossa, it was subordinated to the German Army's 221st Security Division and deployed in German-occupied areas, specifically the Army Group Centre Rear Area, of the Soviet Union, as part of Wehrmacht's security forces. Alongside detachments from the Einsatzgruppen and the SS Cavalry Brigade, it perpetrated mass murders and was responsible for large-scale crimes against humanity targeting civilian populations.

== Background and formation ==
The German Order Police was a key instrument of the security apparatus of Nazi Germany. In the prewar period, Heinrich Himmler, the head of the SS, and Kurt Daluege, chief of the Order Police, cooperated in transforming the police force of the Weimar Republic into militarised formations ready to serve the regime's aims of conquest and racial annihilation. The police units participated in the annexation of Austria and the occupation of Czechoslovakia. Police troops were first formed into battalion-sized formations for the invasion of Poland, where they were deployed for security and policing purposes, also taking part in executions and mass deportations.

Twenty-three Order Police battalions were slated to take part in the 1941 invasion of the Soviet Union, Operation Barbarossa. Two battalions were assigned to support the Einsatzgruppen, the mobile death squads of the SS, and the Organisation Todt, the military construction group. Twelve were formed into regiments, three battalions each, and designated as Police Regiments Centre, North, South, and Special Purpose. Nine, including Police Battalion 309, were attached to security divisions of the Wehrmacht. The goals of the police battalions were to secure the rear by eliminating the remnants of the enemy forces, guarding the prisoners of war, and protecting the lines of communications and captured industrial facilities. Their instructions also included, as Daluege stated, the "combat of criminal elements, above all political elements".

Police Battalion 309 was subordinated to the German Army's 221st Security Division. Comprising about 550 men, the battalion was raised from recruits mobilised from the 1905–1915 year groups. They were led by career police professionals, steeped in the ideology of Nazism, driven by anti-semitism and anti-Bolshevism. The 221st Security Division itself was formed in June 1941. Police Battalion 309 was its only motorised formation.

== Great Synagogue, Białystok crime ==
On the morning of June 27, 1941, Nazi troops from Police Battalion 309 surrounded the town square by the Great Synagogue, and forced residents from their homes into the street. Some were shoved up against building walls and shot dead. Others—approximately 2,000 men, women and children—were locked in the synagogue, which was subsequently set on fire; there they burned to death. The Nazi onslaught continued with the grenading of numerous homes and further shootings. As the flames from the synagogue spread and merged with the grenade fires, the entire square was engulfed. On that day, some 3,000 Jews lost their lives. (Archive from GeoCities)

== Aftermath ==
The Order Police as a whole had not been declared a criminal organisation by the Allies, unlike the SS, and its members were able to reintegrate into society largely unmolested, with many returning to police careers in Austria and West Germany.

== See also ==
- Bandenbekämpfung

== Bibliography ==
- Blood, Phillip W. (2006). Hitler's Bandit Hunters: The SS and the Nazi Occupation of Europe. Potomac Books. ISBN 978-1-59797-021-1.
- Persico, Joseph E. (22 October 2002). Roosevelt's Secret War: FDR and World War II Espionage. Random House. ISBN 0-3757-6126-8.
- Showalter, Dennis (2005). "Foreword". Hitler's Police Battalions: Enforcing Racial War in the East. Kansas City: University Press of Kansas. ISBN 978-0-7006-1724-1.
- Smith, Michael (2004). "Bletchley Park and the Holocaust". In Scott, L. V.; Jackson, P. D. (eds.). Understanding Intelligence in the Twenty-First Century: Journeys in Shadows. Routledge. ISBN 0714655333.
- Westermann, Edward B. (2005). Hitler's Police Battalions: Enforcing Racial War in the East. Kansas City: University Press of Kansas. ISBN 978-0-7006-1724-1.
