= Police Battalion 303 =

- Polizeibattalion 303
- Active: 1941–
- Country: Nazi Germany
- Role: Rear-area security Participation in the Holocaust and Bandenbekämpfung ("bandit-fighting")
- Size: Battalion
- Part of: Order Police under SS command

The Police Battalion 303 (Polizeibattalion 303) was a formation of the German Order Police (uniformed police) during the Nazi era. During Operation Barbarossa, it was subordinated to the SS and deployed in German-occupied areas, specifically the Army Group Centre Rear Area, of the Soviet Union, as part of Police Regiment South. Alongside detachments from the Einsatzgruppen of the SD and the 1st SS Infantry Brigade of the Waffen-SS, it perpetrated mass murder in the Holocaust and was responsible for large-scale crimes against humanity targeting civilian populations.

== Background and formation ==
The German Order Police (uniformed police) was a key instrument of the security apparatus of Nazi Germany. During the prewar period, SS chief Heinrich Himmler and Kurt Daluege, chief of the Order Police, cooperated in transforming the police force of the Weimar Republic into militarised formations ready to serve the regime's aims of conquest and racial annihilation. Police troops were first formed into battalion-sized formations for the 1939 invasion of Poland, where they were deployed for security and policing purposes, also taking part in executions and mass deportations.

Twenty-three Order Police battalions were slated to take part in the 1941 invasion of the Soviet Union, known as Operation Barbarossa. Nine were attached to security divisions of the Wehrmacht. Two battalions were assigned to support the Einsatzgruppen, the mobile death squads of the SS, and Organisation Todt, the military construction group. Twelve were formed into regiments, three battalions each, and designated as Police Regiments Centre, North, South, and Special Purpose. The goals of the police battalions were to secure the rear by eliminating the remnants of the enemy forces, guarding the prisoners of war, and protecting the lines of communications and captured industrial facilities. Their instructions also included, as Daluege stated, the "combat of criminal elements, above all political elements".

Along with Police Battalion 45 and 314, Police Battalion 303 was assigned to Police Regiment South. Comprising about 550 men, the battalion was raised from recruits mobilised from the 1905–1915 year groups. They were led by career police professionals, steeped in the ideology of Nazism and driven by anti-semitism and anti-Bolshevism. The regiment was placed under the command of Hermann Franz, a career policeman who had previously served in the Order Police in the occupied Poland. When the regiment crossed the German-Soviet border, it came under the control of Friedrich Jeckeln, the Higher SS and Police Leader (HSS-PF) for Army Group South in Ukraine.

== Operational history ==
Police Battalion 303's actions quickly escalated to genocide while in the occupied Soviet Union. During the summer months, the battalion took part in joint actions with the 1st SS Infantry Brigade of the Waffen-SS, both providing support and undertaking independent killings. The brigade's report of 19 August to the Command Staff Reichsführer-SS (SS operational staff set up for the invasion) noted that the battalion and the brigade jointly participated in "combat of gangs".

During the massacre at Babi Yar, all three battalions of the regiment took part. The police cordoned off the area, while Sonderkommando 4a and a platoon of Waffen-SS men did the shooting.

The killing activities of both the Einsatzgruppen detachments and the Police Regiment South slowed down the farther the Wehrmacht advanced, as more Jews were able to escape east and the density of the pre-war Jewish population was lower in Eastern Ukraine. Nonetheless, the murder operations continued, targeting Jews, communists and "suspicious elements". In July 1942, the regiment was redesignated as the 10th Police Regiment.

== Aftermath ==
The Order Police as a whole had not been declared a criminal organisation by the Allies, unlike the SS. Its members were able to reintegrate into society largely unmolested, with many returning to police careers in Austria and West Germany.

== Bibliography ==
- Brandon, Ray & Lower, Wendy (2008). The Shoah in Ukraine: History, Testimony, Memorialization. Indiana University Press. ISBN 978-0-253-35084-8.
- Breitman, Richard (1998). Official Secrets: What the Nazis Planned, What the British and Americans Knew. New York: Hill and Wang/Farrar Straus & Giroux. p. 46. ISBN 9780809038190. "police regiment center."
- Longerich, Peter (2010). Holocaust: The Nazi Persecution and Murder of the Jews. Oxford; New York: Oxford University Press. ISBN 978-0-19-280436-5.
- Persico, Joseph E. (2002). Roosevelt's Secret War: FDR and World War II Espionage. Random House. ISBN 0-3757-6126-8.
- Showalter, Dennis (2005). "Foreword". Hitler's Police Battalions: Enforcing Racial War in the East. Kansas City: University Press of Kansas. ISBN 978-0-7006-1724-1.
- Smith, Michael (2004). "Bletchley Park and the Holocaust". In Scott, L. V.; Jackson, P. D. (eds.). Understanding Intelligence in the Twenty-First Century: Journeys in Shadows. ISBN 0714655333.
- Tessin, Georg & Kannapin, Norbert (2000). Waffen-SS und Ordnungspolizei im Kriegseinsatz 1939 - 1945: ein Überblick anhand der Feldpostübersicht. Osnabrück: Biblio-Verlag. ISBN 3-7648-2471-9.
- Westermann, Edward B. (2005). Hitler's Police Battalions: Enforcing Racial War in the East. Kansas City: University Press of Kansas. ISBN 978-0-7006-1724-1.
