= Police Battalion 314 =

- Polizeibattalion 314
- Active: 1941–?
- Country: Nazi Germany
- Role: Nazi security warfare (Bandenbekämpfung); Participation in the Holocaust
- Size: Battalion
- Part of: Order Police under SS command

The Police Battalion 314 (Polizeibattalion 314) was a formation of the German Order Police (uniformed police) during the Nazi era. During Operation Barbarossa, it was subordinated to the SS and deployed in German-occupied areas, specifically the Army Group Centre Rear Area, of the Soviet Union, as part of Police Regiment South. Alongside detachments from the Einsatzgruppen and the 1st SS Infantry Brigade, it perpetrated mass murder in the Holocaust and was responsible for large-scale crimes against humanity targeting civilian populations.

== Background and formation ==
The German Order Police (uniformed police) was a key instrument of the security apparatus of Nazi Germany. During the prewar period, SS chief Heinrich Himmler and Kurt Daluege, chief of the Order Police, cooperated in transforming the police force of the Weimar Republic into militarised formations ready to serve the regime's aims of conquest and racial annihilation. Police troops were first formed into battalion-sized formations for the invasion of Poland, where they were deployed for security and policing purposes, also taking part in executions and mass deportations.

Twenty-three Order Police battalions were slated to take part in the 1941 invasion of the Soviet Union, known as Operation Barbarossa. Nine were attached to Wehrmacht's security divisions. Two battalions were assigned to support the Einsatzgruppen, the mobile death squads of the SS, and Organisation Todt, the military construction group. Twelve were formed into regiments, three battalions each, and designated as Police Regiments Centre, North, South, and Special Purpose. The goals of the police battalions were to secure the rear by eliminating the remnants of the enemy forces, guarding the prisoners of war, and protecting the lines of communications and captured industrial facilities. Their instructions also included, as Daluege stated, the "combat of criminal elements, above all political elements".

Along with Police Battalion 45 and 303, Police Battalion 314 was assigned to Police Regiment South. Comprising about 550 men, the battalion was raised from recruits mobilised from the 1905–1915 year groups. They were led by career police professionals, steeped in the ideology of Nazism, driven by anti-semitism and anti-Bolshevism. The regiment was placed under the command of Hermann Franz, a career policeman who had previously served in the Order Police in the occupied Poland. When the regiment crossed the German-Soviet border, it came under the control of Friedrich Jeckeln, the Higher SS and Police Leader (HSS-PF) for Army Group South in Ukraine.

== Operational history ==
Upon formation, while still in occupied Poland, Police Battalion 314 participated in the round-ups of Polish civilians for deportation to slave labour to Germany. Its actions quickly escalated to genocide while in the occupied Soviet Union. On 22 July, the battalion killed 214 Jews in a settlement near Kovel, including entire families. The orders came down from the regimental commander, who had referred to an order from Heinrich Himmler.

During the summer months, the battalion took part in joint actions with the 1st SS Infantry Brigade of the Waffen-SS, both providing support and undertaking independent killings. The brigade's report of 19 August to the Command Staff Reichsführer-SS (SS operational staff set up for the invasion) noted that the battalion executed 25 Jews and 16 Ukrainians. It also referred to the unit's killing of 322 Jews in the town of Slavuta. The 21 August report detailed the battalion's killing of 367 Jews in a "cleansing action" while securing German supply lines, while the 22 August report noted that the unit executed 28 Ukrainians on charges of "arson". In the last week of August, the battalion killed a further 294 Jews. During the month, the unit killed at least 1,689 people in seven separate operations.

During the September 1941 massacre at Babi Yar, all three battalions of the regiment took part. The police cordoned off the area, while Sonderkommando 4a and a platoon of Waffen-SS men did the shooting. In October 1941, Police Battalion 314, accompanied by Ukrainian auxiliary police, carried a large-scale massacre in Kirovograd (now Kropyvnytskyi); victims included 4,200 Jews and 600 prisoners of war. In January 1942, again accompanied by Sonderkommando 4a, the battalion took part in the shooting of 12,000 Kharkov Jews at the Drobytsky Yar, while several hundred were killed in gas vans.

The killing activities of both the Einsatzgruppen detachments and the Police Regiment South slowed down the farther the Wehrmacht advanced, as more Jews were able to escape east and the density of the pre-war Jewish population was lower in Eastern Ukraine. Nonetheless, the murder operations continued, targeting Jews, communists and "suspicious elements". In July 1942, the regiment was redesignated as the 10th Police Regiment.

== Decrypts by British intelligence ==
While the activities of the Police Regiment South, the Einsatzgruppen detachment and the 1st SS Brigade, progressed, the reports by the murder squads were being intercepted and decoded by MI6, the British intelligence service. As part of Ultra, British signals intelligence program, the codebreaking facilities at Bletchley Park decoded and analysed the messages. The head of MI6, Stewart Menzies, communicated the decrypts directly to the British Prime Minister Winston Churchill. The first message decrypted was the 18 July report on the mass murders by the Police Regiment Centre of over 1,100 Jews at Slonim, in the Army Group Centre Rear Area. In late July and early August, similar reports were intercepted on a regular basis. The first messages mentioning the murders by the Police Regiment South were intercepted on August 23, with Police Battalion 314 reporting executions of 367 Jews south-east of Kiev.

== Aftermath ==
The Order Police as a whole had not been declared a criminal organisation by the Allies, unlike the SS. Its members were able to reintegrate into society largely unmolested, with many returning to police careers. Police Battalion 314's home base had been in Vienna, and many of its members joined Austrian police after the war. Members of the battalion were investigated by the Austrian authorities, with at least two former members providing testimony on the mass killings of Jews. One former member testified that the killing method changed from using sidearms and carbines to machine guns since the former was deemed "too tedious".

For reasons of national security, the Ultra program remained classified after the war and the decrypts pertaining to the activities of security and police troops during the war were not shared with Britain's allies. Consequently, they were not used during the Nuremberg trials or subsequent investigations of German war crimes and crimes against humanity. The decrypts were finally released in 1993.

== Bibliography ==
- Brandon, Ray & Lower, Wendy (2008). The Shoah in Ukraine: History, Testimony, Memorialization. Indiana University Press. ISBN 978-0-253-35084-8.
- Breitman, Richard (1998). Official Secrets: What the Nazis Planned, What the British and Americans Knew. New York: Hill and Wang/Farrar Straus & Giroux. ISBN 9780809001842.
- Longerich, Peter (2010). Holocaust: The Nazi Persecution and Murder of the Jews. Oxford; New York: Oxford University Press. ISBN 978-0-19-280436-5.
- Persico, Joseph E. (22 October 2002). Roosevelt's Secret War: FDR and World War II Espionage. Random House. ISBN 0-3757-6126-8.
- Showalter, Dennis (2005). "Foreword". Hitler's Police Battalions: Enforcing Racial War in the East. Kansas City: University Press of Kansas. ISBN 978-0-7006-1724-1.
- Smith, Michael (2004). "Bletchley Park and the Holocaust". In Scott, L. V.; Jackson, P. D. (eds.). Understanding Intelligence in the Twenty-First Century: Journeys in Shadows. ISBN 0714655333.
- Tessin, Georg & Kannapin, Norbert (2000). Waffen-SS und Ordnungspolizei im Kriegseinsatz 1939 - 1945: ein Überblick anhand der Feldpostübersicht. Osnabrück: Biblio-Verlag. ISBN 3-7648-2471-9.
- Westermann, Edward B. (2005). Hitler's Police Battalions: Enforcing Racial War in the East. Kansas City: University Press of Kansas. ISBN 978-0-7006-1724-1.
