= Police Battalion 316 =

- Polizeibattalion 316
- Active: 1941–1945
- Country: Nazi Germany
- Role: Nazi security warfare Participation in the Holocaust
- Size: Battalion
- Part of: Order Police under SS command, part of: Police Regiment Centre (1941–1942); 4th SS Police Regiment (1942–)

The Police Battalion 316 (Polizeibattalion 316) was a formation of the German Order Police (uniformed police) during the Nazi era. During Operation Barbarossa, it was subordinated to the SS and deployed in German-occupied areas, specifically the Army Group Centre Rear Area, of the Soviet Union, as part of Police Regiment Centre. Alongside detachments from the Einsatzgruppen and the SS Cavalry Brigade, it perpetrated mass murder in the Holocaust and was responsible for large-scale crimes against humanity targeting civilian populations under the guise of "anti-partisan" warfare. In mid-1942, the battalion was reassigned to the 4th Police Regiment and operated in Slovenia.

== Background and formation ==
The German Order Police was a key instrument of the security apparatus of Nazi Germany. In the prewar period, Heinrich Himmler, the head of the SS, and Kurt Daluege, chief of the Order Police, cooperated in transforming the police force of the Weimar Republic into militarised formations ready to serve the regime's aims of conquest and racial annihilation. The police units participated in the annexation of Austria and the occupation of Czechoslovakia. Police troops were first formed into battalion-sized formations for the invasion of Poland, where they were deployed for security and policing purposes, also taking part in executions and mass deportations.

Twenty-three Order Police battalions were slated to take part in the 1941 invasion of the Soviet Union, Operation Barbarossa. Nine were attached to security divisions of the Wehrmacht. Two battalions were assigned to support the Einsatzgruppen, the mobile death squads of the SS, and the Organisation Todt, the military construction group. Twelve were formed into regiments, three battalions each, and designated as Police Regiments Centre, North, South, and Special Purpose. The goals of the police battalions were to secure the rear by eliminating the remnants of the enemy forces, guarding the prisoners of war, and protecting the lines of communications and captured industrial facilities. Their instructions also included, as Daluege stated, the "combat of criminal elements, above all political elements".

Along with Police Battalion 307 and 322, Police Battalion 316 was assigned to Police Regiment Centre. Comprising about 550 men, the battalion was raised from recruits mobilised from the 1905–1915 year groups. They were led by career police professionals, steeped in the ideology of Nazism, driven by anti-semitism and anti-Bolshevism. The regiment was placed under the command of Max Montua, a career policeman. When it crossed the German-Soviet border, the regiment came under the control of Erich von dem Bach-Zelewski, the Higher SS and Police Leader (HSS-PF) for Army Group Centre.

== Operational history ==
Himmler made a personal visit to the headquarters of Police Regiment Centre in Białystok on 8 July where he spoke to Montua, Bach-Zalewski and the regiment's officers. On 10 July, Daluege visited the unit and addressed the members of the regiment arrayed in a parade formation, extolling them to "exterminate" Bolshevism as a "blessing for Germany". On 11 July, Montua passed a confidential order from Bach-Zalewski to the battalion commanders that Jews, who had been "convicted of looting", were to be shot; an execution took place the same day. Around this time, Police Battalions 316 and 322 rounded up approximately 3,000 Jewish men from Białystok and shot them in a nearby forest.

On 17 July, the regiment murdered over 1,100 Jews in Slonim, with Bach-Zalewski reporting to Himmler on 18 July: "Yesterday's cleansing action in Slonim by Police Regiment Centre. 1,153 Jewish plunderers were shot". By 20 July, the unit's reports referred to executions of Jewish women and children.

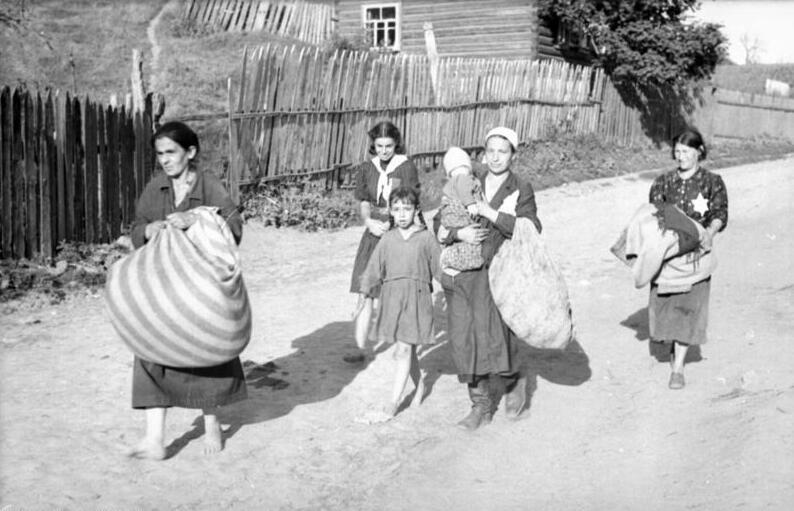
Wehrmacht propaganda photograph of the Jewish women in Mogilev, July 1941. Six thousand Mogilev Jews were murdered by SS forces and Police Battalions 316 and 322 in October 1941.

On 2 October 1941, Police Battalions 316 and 322, along with Bach-Zalewski's staff company and Ukrainian auxiliaries, rounded up 2,200 Jews in the Mogilev ghetto. Sixty-five were killed during the roundups, and another 550 executed the next day. Another killing operation later that month, by Einsatzkommando 8 and the two police battalions, brought the total number of victims in Mogilev to about 6,000.

On November 7–8, the battalion participated in the murder of Jews in Bobruisk. The inmates of the Bobruisk ghetto were rounded up in the early morning; they were loaded into trucks and taken to the village of Kamenka where they were shot into pits dug for this purpose. About 5,281 people were killed by the personnel of the battalion and the Einsatzkommando 8 and Police Battalion 316.

In December, after the German defeat in the Battle of Moscow, the regiment was sent to the front lines to reinforce the German defenses, thus depriving Bach-Zalewski of manpower. The battalion was assigned to guard and security duties to the immediate rear of the front-line troops, but no detailed information is available on its activities during this time. Police Battalion 316 was withdrawn from the front at the end of April 1942 and then returned to Germany in mid- to late May to recuperate where it was based in Bottrop, Buer, and Gelsenkirchen. Several months later, it was transferred to Slovenia where its First Company helped to conduct a brief anti-partisan operation (Bandenbekämpfung, or "bandit-fighting"), together with Police Battalion 93, in the vicinity of Škofja Loka between 15 and 17 July. That same month it was redesignated as the First Battalion of the 4th Police Regiment.

== Decrypts by British intelligence ==
Progress reports on the murderous activities of the Police Regiment Center, the Einsatzgruppen detachment and the SS Cavalry Brigade were regularly forwarded by Bach-Zalewski. However, unbeknownst to him, the reports were being intercepted by MI6, the British intelligence service, whose code breakers at Bletchley Park had broken the German ciphers as part of Ultra, the British signals intelligence program.

The head of MI6, Stewart Menzies, communicated the decrypts directly to British Prime Minister Winston Churchill. The first decrypted message was the 18 July report on the mass murders by the regiment at Slonim. In late July and early August, similar reports were intercepted on a regular basis. Angered by the scope of the atrocities, Churchill delivered a speech over the radio on 24 August stating:

Whole districts are being exterminated (...) Scores of thousands of executions are perpetrated by the German police troops upon the Soviet patriots defending their native soil. Since the Mongol invasion of Europe, there have never been methodical, merciless butchery on such a scale or approaching such a scale. We are in the presence of a crime without a name.

In May–June 1942, Police Battalions 307, 316, and 322 were reassigned to other regiments and continued to engage in security warfare (Bandenbekämpfung, or "bandit-fighting") and genocide. Battalions 316 and 322 were sent to Slovenia, with Battalion 316 then assigned to the 4th SS Police Regiment in France and redesignated as the First Battalion of the regiment.

== Aftermath ==
The Order Police as a whole had not been declared a criminal organisation by the Allies, unlike the SS, and its members were able to reintegrate into society largely unmolested, with many returning to police careers in Austria and West Germany.

== Bibliography ==
- Arico, Massimo (2010). Ordnungspolizei: Encyclopedia of the German Police Battalions. Stockholm: Leandoer and Ekholm. ISBN 978-91-85657-99-5.
- Beorn, Waitman Wade (2014). Marching into Darkness: The Wehrmacht and the Holocaust in Belarus. Cambridge: Harvard University Press. ISBN 978-0674725508.
- Blood, Phillip W. (2006). Hitler's Bandit Hunters: The SS and the Nazi Occupation of Europe. Potomac Books. ISBN 978-1-59797-021-1.
- Breitman, Richard (1998). Official Secrets: What the Nazis Planned, What the British and Americans Knew. New York:, 1998. New York: Hill and Wang/Farrar Straus & Giroux. ISBN 9780809001842.
- Curilla, Wolfgang (2010). Der Judenmord in Polen und die deutsche Ordnungspolizei 1939-1945. Paderborn: Schöningh Paderborn. ISBN 978-3-50677043-1.
- Megargee, Geoffrey P., ed. (2009). Encyclopedia of Camps and Ghettos, 1933–1945. Vol. II. Bloomington: Indiana University Press. ISBN 978-0-253-35328-3.
- Persico, Joseph E. (22 October 2002). Roosevelt's Secret War: FDR and World War II Espionage. Random House. ISBN 0-3757-6126-8.
- Showalter, Dennis (2005). "Foreword". Hitler's Police Battalions: Enforcing Racial War in the East. Kansas City: University Press of Kansas. ISBN 978-0-7006-1724-1.
- Smith, Michael (2004). "Bletchley Park and the Holocaust". In Scott, L. V.; Jackson, P. D. (eds.). Understanding Intelligence in the Twenty-First Century: Journeys in Shadows. Routledge. ISBN 0714655333.
- Tessin, Georg & Kannapin, Norbert (2000). Waffen-SS und Ordnungspolizei im Kriegseinsatz 1939 - 1945: ein Überblick anhand der Feldpostübersicht (in German). Osnabrück: Biblio-Verlag. ISBN 3-7648-2471-9.
- "Selected Records from the Military Historical Institute Archives, Prague, 1941-1944" (PDF). United States Holocaust Memorial Museum. 2008.
- Westermann, Edward B. (2005). Hitler's Police Battalions: Enforcing Racial War in the East. Kansas City: University Press of Kansas. ISBN 978-0-7006-1724-1.
