= Police Battalion 322 =

- Polizeibattalion 322
- Active: 1941–
- Country: Nazi Germany
- Role: Nazi security warfare Participation in the Holocaust
- Size: Battalion
- Part of: Order Police battalion under SS command

The Police Battalion 322 (Polizeibattalion 322) was a formation of the German Order Police (uniformed police) during the Nazi era. During Operation Barbarossa, it was subordinated to the SS and deployed in German-occupied areas, specifically the Army Group Centre Rear Area, of the Soviet Union, as part of Police Regiment Centre.

Alongside detachments from the Einsatzgruppen and the SS Cavalry Brigade, it perpetrated mass murder during the Holocaust and was responsible for large-scale crimes against humanity targeting civilian populations. In mid-1942, the battalion was reassigned to the 5th Police Regiment and operated in German-occupied territories of Slovenia.

== Background and formation ==
The German Order Police (uniformed police) was a key instrument of the security apparatus of Nazi Germany. In the prewar period, Heinrich Himmler, the head of the SS, and Kurt Daluege, chief of the Order Police, cooperated in transforming the police force of the Weimar Republic into militarised formations ready to serve the regime's aims of conquest and racial annihilation. The police units participated in the annexation of Austria and the occupation of Czechoslovakia. Police troops were first formed into battalion-sized formations for the 1939 invasion of Poland, where they were deployed for security and policing purposes, also taking part in executions and mass deportations.

Twenty-three Order Police battalions were slated to take part in the 1941 invasion of the Soviet Union, Operation Barbarossa. Nine were attached to security divisions of the Wehrmacht. Two battalions were assigned to support the Einsatzgruppen, the mobile death squads of the SS, and the Organisation Todt, the military construction group. Twelve were formed into regiments, three battalions each, and designated as Police Regiments Centre, North, South, and Special Purpose. The goals of the police battalions were to secure the rear by eliminating the remnants of the enemy forces, guarding the prisoners of war, and protecting the lines of communications and captured industrial facilities. Their instructions also included, as Daluege stated, the "combat of criminal elements, above all political elements".

Along with Police Battalions 307 and 316, Police Battalion 322 was assigned to Police Regiment Centre. Comprising about 550 men, the battalion was raised from recruits mobilised from the 1905–1915 year groups. They were led by career police professionals, steeped in the ideology of Nazism, driven by anti-semitism and anti-Bolshevism. The regiment was placed under the command of Max Montua, a career policeman. When it crossed the German-Soviet border, the regiment came under the control of Erich von dem Bach-Zelewski, the Higher SS and Police Leader (HSS-PF) for Army Group Centre.

== Operational history ==
Himmler made a personal visit to the headquarters of Police Regiment Centre in Białystok on 8 July where he spoke to Montua, Bach-Zalewski and the regiment's officers. The same evening, a company of Police Battalion 322 participated in the shooting of about 1,000 Jews under the direction of Einsatzgruppe B. On 10 July, Daluege visited the unit and addressed the members of the regiment arrayed in a parade formation, extolling them to "exterminate" Bolshevism as a "blessing for Germany". On 11 July, Montua passed a confidential order from Bach-Zalewski to the battalion commanders that Jews, who had been "convicted of looting", were to be shot; an execution took place the same day. Around this time, Police Battalions 316 and 322 rounded up approximately 3,000 Jewish men from Białystok and shot them in a nearby forest.

On 17 July, the regiment murdered over 1,100 Jews in Slonim, with Bach-Zalewski reporting to Himmler on 18 July: "Yesterday's cleansing action in Slonim by Police Regiment Centre. 1,153 Jewish plunderers were shot". By 20 July, the unit's reports referred to executions of Jewish women and children.

By late August, Police Battalion 322 moved to Minsk, where, on September 1, it conducted a killing operation together with the units of Einsatzgruppe B. The victims included 290 Jewish men and 40 Jewish women.

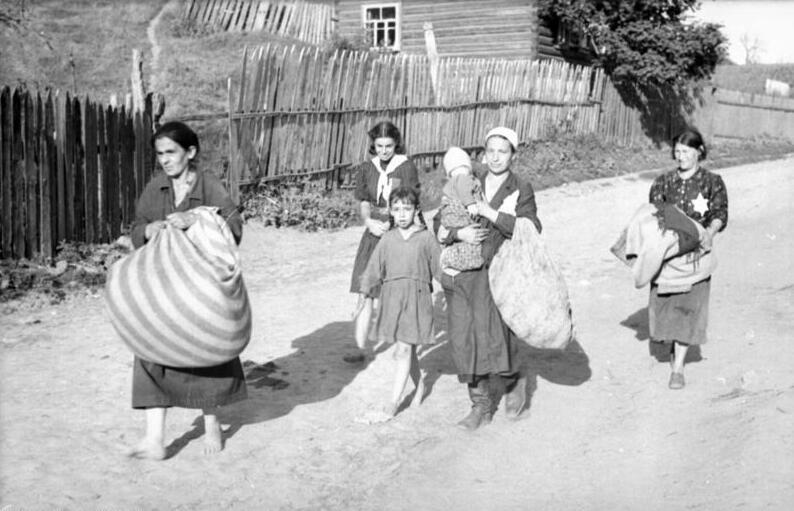
Wehrmacht propaganda photograph of the Jewish women in Mogilev, July 1941. Mogilev Jews were murdered by Police Battalion 322 in October 1941.

In September 1941, the regiment participated in the Mogilev conference, organised by General Max von Schenckendorff, commander of the Army Group Centre Rear Area, with assistance from Montua. The conference included three field exercises. On the second day, participants travelled to a nearby settlement where a company of Police Battalion 322, assisted by the troops of the SD, conducted a demonstration of how to surround and screen a village. According to the after-action report, "suspicious strangers" (Ortsfremde) or "partisans" could not be found. The screening of the population revealed fifty-one Jewish civilians, of whom thirty-two were shot.

On 2 October 1941, Police Battalion 322, along with Bach-Zalewski's staff company and Ukrainian auxiliaries, rounded up 2,200 Jews in the Mogilev ghetto. Sixty-five were killed during the roundups, and another 550 executed the next day. Throughout the rest of the month, the battalion continued to execute Jews, communists, and alleged partisans in the vicinity of Mogilev. The commander of the unit received the Iron Cross, 2nd class, following these operations.

In December, after the German defeat in the Battle of Moscow, the regiment was sent to the front lines to reinforce the German defenses, thus depriving Bach-Zalewski of manpower. The battalion was assigned to guard and security duties to the immediate rear of the front-line troops. In May–June 1942, Police Battalions 307, 316, and 322 were reassigned to other regiments and continued to engage in security warfare and genocide. Battalion 322 was sent to the German-occupied territories of Slovenia, where it became part of the 5th SS Police Regiment.

== Aftermath ==
The Order Police as a whole had not been declared a criminal organisation by the Allies, unlike the SS, and its members were able to reintegrate into society largely unmolested, with many returning to police careers in Austria and West Germany. Personnel of Police Battalion 322 were investigated by the West German authorities in the 1960s. One of the battalion's members stated:

"The expression 'combat of the partisans' is strictly speaking a complete misnomer. We did not have a single battle with partisans after we left Mogilev. ... The fact of the matter [was] that those found without identity cards sufficed for their arrest and executions".

== See also ==
- Bandenbekämpfung

== Bibliography ==
- Arico, Massimo (2010). Ordnungspolizei: Encyclopedia of the German Police Battalions. Stockholm: Leandoer and Ekholm. ISBN 978-91-85657-99-5.
- Beorn, Waitman Wade (2014). Marching into Darkness: The Wehrmacht and the Holocaust in Belarus. Cambridge: Harvard University Press. ISBN 978-0674725508.
- Blood, Phillip W. (2006). Hitler's Bandit Hunters: The SS and the Nazi Occupation of Europe. Potomac Books. ISBN 978-1-59797-021-1.
- Breitman, Richard (1998). Official Secrets: What the Nazis Planned, What the British and Americans Knew. New York: Hill and Wang/Farrar Straus & Giroux. ISBN 9780809001842.
- Curilla, Wolfgang (2010). Der Judenmord in Polen und die deutsche Ordnungspolizei 1939-1945. Paderborn: Schöningh Paderborn. ISBN 978-3-50677043-1.
- Persico, Joseph E. (22 October 2002). Roosevelt's Secret War: FDR and World War II Espionage. Random House. ISBN 0-3757-6126-8.
- Showalter, Dennis (2005). "Foreword". Hitler's Police Battalions: Enforcing Racial War in the East. Kansas City: University Press of Kansas. ISBN 978-0-7006-1724-1.
- Smith, Michael (2004). "Bletchley Park and the Holocaust". In Scott, L. V.; Jackson, P. D. (eds.). Understanding Intelligence in the Twenty-First Century: Journeys in Shadows. Routledge. ISBN 0714655333.
- Tessin, Georg & Kannapin, Norbert (2000). Waffen-SS und Ordnungspolizei im Kriegseinsatz 1939 - 1945: ein Überblick anhand der Feldpostübersicht. Osnabrück: Biblio-Verlag. ISBN 3-7648-2471-9.
- "Selected Records from the Military Historical Institute Archives, Prague, 1941-1944" (PDF). United States Holocaust Memorial Museum. 2008.
- Westermann, Edward B. (2005). Hitler's Police Battalions: Enforcing Racial War in the East. Kansas City: University Press of Kansas. ISBN 978-0-7006-1724-1.
