= Police Battalion 320 =

- Polizeibattalion 320
- Active: 1941–1945 (?)
- Country: Nazi Germany
- Role: Rear-area security Participation in the Holocaust and Bandenbekämpfung ("bandit-fighting")
- Size: Battalion
- Part of: Order Police battalion under SS command, part of: Police Regiment Special Purpose (1941–1942); 11th SS Police Regiment (1942–)

Police Battalion 320 (Polizeibattalion 320) was a formation of the German Order Police (uniformed police) during the Nazi era. During Operation Barbarossa, it was subordinated to the SS and deployed in German-occupied areas, specifically the Army Group South Rear Area, of the Soviet Union, as part of Police Regiment Special Purpose (later the 11th SS Police Regiment). Alongside detachments from the Einsatzgruppen of the SD, it committed mass murders in the Holocaust and was responsible for large-scale crimes against humanity targeting civilian populations.

== Background and formation ==
The German Order Police (Ordnungspolizei) was a key instrument of the security apparatus of Nazi Germany. In the prewar period, Heinrich Himmler, the head of the SS, and Kurt Daluege, chief of the Order Police, cooperated in transforming the police force of the Weimar Republic into militarised formations ready to serve the regime's aims of conquest and racial annihilation. Police troops were first formed into battalion-sized formations for the invasion of Poland, where they were deployed for security and policing purposes, also taking part in executions and mass deportations.

Twenty-three Order Police battalions were slated to take part in the 1941 invasion of the Soviet Union, Operation Barbarossa. Nine were attached to security divisions of the Wehrmacht, three for each Army Group Rear Areas. Two battalions were assigned to support the Einsatzgruppen, the mobile death squads of the SS, and the Organisation Todt, the military construction group. Twelve were formed into regiments, three battalions each, and designated as Police Regiments North, Centre, South, and Special Purpose.

Alongside Police Battalions 304 and 315, Police Battalion 320 was assigned to Police Regiment Special Purpose, under the command of Gerret Korsemann, a career policeman. When the regiment crossed the German-Soviet border, it came under the control of Friedrich Jeckeln, the Higher SS and Police Leader (HSS-PF) for Army Group South in Ukraine.

== Operational history ==
In August 1941, Police Battalion 320 perpetrated the Kamianets-Podilskyi massacre, alongside Jeckeln's staff company. The staff company performed the shooting, while the Police Battalion 320 cordoned off the area. The massacres resulted in the murder of thousands of Jews deported from Hungary and rounded up Ukrainian Jews. Shortly thereafter, Police Battalion 320 reported the shooting of twenty-two hundred Jews at another location north-east of Kamianets-Podilskyi. The overall Einsatzgruppen report for the operation listed a total of 23,000 victims.

== Bibliography ==
- Breitman, Richard (1998). Official Secrets: What the Nazis Planned, What the British and Americans Knew. New York: Hill and Wang/Farrar Straus & Giroux. p. 46. ISBN 9780809038190. "police regiment center."
- Browning, Christopher (2004). The Origins of the Final Solution: The Evolution of Nazi Jewish Policy, September 1939 – March 1942. With contributions by Jürgen Matthäus. Lincoln: University of Nebraska Press. ISBN 0-803-25979-4.
- Longerich, Peter (2010). Holocaust: The Nazi Persecution and Murder of the Jews. Oxford; New York: Oxford University Press. ISBN 978-0-19-280436-5.
- Persico, Joseph E. (22 October 2002). Roosevelt's Secret War: FDR and World War II Espionage. Random House. ISBN 0-3757-6126-8.
- Showalter, Dennis (2005). "Foreword". Hitler's Police Battalions: Enforcing Racial War in the East. Kansas City: University Press of Kansas. ISBN 978-0-7006-1724-1.
- Smith, Michael (2004). "Bletchley Park and the Holocaust". In Scott, L. V.; Jackson, P. D. (eds.). Understanding Intelligence in the Twenty-First Century: Journeys in Shadows. ISBN 0714655333.
- Tessin, Georg & Kannapin, Norbert (2000). Waffen-SS und Ordnungspolizei im Kriegseinsatz 1939 - 1945: ein Überblick anhand der Feldpostübersicht. Osnabrück: Biblio-Verlag. ISBN 3-7648-2471-9.
- Westermann, Edward B. (2005). Hitler's Police Battalions: Enforcing Racial War in the East. Kansas City: University Press of Kansas. ISBN 978-0-7006-1724-1.
