= Police Battalion 307 =

- Polizeibattalion 307
- Active: 1941–
- Country: Nazi Germany
- Role: Nazi security warfare Participation in the Holocaust
- Size: Battalion
- Part of: Order Police battalions under SS command, part of: Police Regiment Centre (1941–1942); 23rd SS Police Regiment (1942–)

The Police Battalion 307 (Polizeibattalion 307) was a formation of the Order Police (uniformed police) during the Nazi era. During Operation Barbarossa, it was subordinated to the SS and deployed in German-occupied areas, specifically the Army Group Centre Rear Area, of the Soviet Union, as part of Police Regiment Centre. Alongside detachments from the Einsatzgruppen, it perpetrated mass murder in the Holocaust and was responsible for large-scale crimes against humanity targeting civilian populations. In mid-1942, the battalion was reassigned to the 23rd Police Regiment and operated in Belarus.

== Background and formation ==
The German Order Police was a key instrument of the security apparatus of Nazi Germany. In the prewar period, Heinrich Himmler, the head of the SS, and Kurt Daluege, chief of the Order Police, cooperated in transforming the police force of the Weimar Republic into militarised formations ready to serve the regime's aims of conquest and racial annihilation. The police units participated in the annexation of Austria and the occupation of Czechoslovakia. Police troops were first formed into battalion-sized formations for the invasion of Poland, where they were deployed for security and policing purposes, also taking part in executions and mass deportations.

Twenty-three Order Police battalions were slated to take part in the 1941 invasion of the Soviet Union, Operation Barbarossa. Nine were attached to security divisions of the Wehrmacht. Two battalions were assigned to support the Einsatzgruppen, the mobile death squads of the SS, and the Organisation Todt, the military construction group. Twelve were formed into regiments, three battalions each, and designated as Police Regiments Centre, North, South, and Special Purpose. The goals of the police battalions were to secure the rear by eliminating the remnants of the enemy forces, guarding the prisoners of war, and protecting the lines of communications and captured industrial facilities. Their instructions also included, as Daluege stated, the "combat of criminal elements, above all political elements".

Along with Police Battalion 316 and 322, Police Battalion 307 was assigned to Police Regiment Centre. Comprising about 550 men, the battalion was raised from recruits mobilised from the 1905–1915 year groups. They were led by career police professionals, steeped in the ideology of Nazism, driven by anti-semitism and anti-Bolshevism. The regiment was placed under the command of Max Montua, a career policeman. When it crossed the German-Soviet border, the regiment came under the control of Erich von dem Bach-Zelewski, the Higher SS and Police Leader (HSS-PF) for Army Group Centre.

== Operational history ==
In early July, Police Battalion 307 participated in the massacre of 4–6,000 Jewish men, Russians and Belarusians in the vicinity of Brest-Litovsk (now Brest, Belarus). Himmler made a personal visit to the headquarters of the regiment in Belostok on 8 July where he spoke to Montua, Bach-Zalewski and the regiment's officers. On 10 July, Daluege visited the unit and addressed the members of the regiment arrayed in a parade formation, extolling them to "exterminate" Bolshevism as a "blessing for Germany". On 11 July, Montua passed a confidential order from Bach-Zalewski to the battalion commanders that Jews, who had been "convicted of looting", were to be shot; an execution took place the same day.

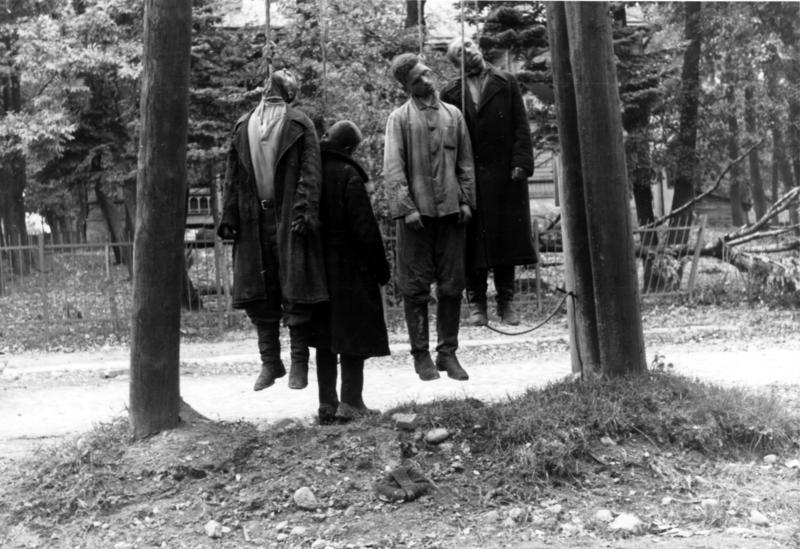
Victims hanged by the police troops in the Soviet Union, August/September 1941

On 17 July, the regiment murdered over 1,100 Jews in Slonim, with Bach-Zalewski reporting to Himmler on 18 July: "Yesterday's cleansing action in Slonim by Police Regiment Centre. 1,153 Jewish plunderers were shot". By 20 July, the unit's reports referred to executions of Jewish women and children.

In December, after the German defeat in the Battle of Moscow, the regiment was sent to the front lines to reinforce the German defenses, thus depriving Bach-Zalewski of manpower. Police Battalion 307 was deployed near Kaluga on 20 December and had been reduced to a combat strength of 60 men by March.

Police Battalions 307, 316, and 322 were reassigned to other regiments and continued to engage in security warfare (Bandenbekämpfung, or "bandit-fighting") and genocide. Battalion 307 was assigned to the 23rd SS Police Regiment and took part in the punitive Operation Sumpffieber in Belarus.

== Aftermath ==
The Order Police as a whole had not been declared a criminal organisation by the Allies, unlike the SS. Its members were able to reintegrate into society largely unmolested, with many returning to police careers in Austria and West Germany.

== Bibliography ==
- Arico, Massimo (2010). Ordnungspolizei: Encyclopedia of the German Police Battalions. Stockholm: Leandoer and Ekholm. ISBN 978-91-85657-99-5.
- Beorn, Waitman Wade (2014). Marching into Darkness: The Wehrmacht and the Holocaust in Belarus. Cambridge: Harvard University Press. ISBN 978-0674725508.
- Blood, Phillip W. (2006). Hitler's Bandit Hunters: The SS and the Nazi Occupation of Europe. Potomac Books. ISBN 978-1-59797-021-1.
- Breitman, Richard (1998). Official Secrets: What the Nazis Planned, What the British and Americans Knew. New York: Hill and Wang/Farrar Straus & Giroux. ISBN 9780809001842.
- Curilla, Wolfgang (2010). Der Judenmord in Polen und die deutsche Ordnungspolizei 1939-1945. Paderborn: Schöningh Paderborn. ISBN 978-3-50677043-1.
- Megargee, Geoffrey P., ed. (2009). Encyclopedia of Camps and Ghettos, 1933–1945. Vol. II. Bloomington: Indiana University Press. ISBN 978-0-253-35328-3.
- Persico, Joseph E. (22 October 2002). Roosevelt's Secret War: FDR and World War II Espionage. Random House. ISBN 0-3757-6126-8.
- Showalter, Dennis (2005). "Foreword". Hitler's Police Battalions: Enforcing Racial War in the East. Kansas City: University Press of Kansas. ISBN 978-0-7006-1724-1.
- Smith, Michael (2004). "Bletchley Park and the Holocaust". In Scott, L. V.; Jackson, P. D. (eds.). Understanding Intelligence in the Twenty-First Century: Journeys in Shadows. Routledge. ISBN 0714655333.
- Tessin, Georg & Kannapin, Norbert (2000). Waffen-SS und Ordnungspolizei im Kriegseinsatz 1939 - 1945: ein Überblick anhand der Feldpostübersicht. Osnabrück: Biblio-Verlag. ISBN 3-7648-2471-9.
- "Selected Records from the Military Historical Institute Archives, Prague, 1941-1944" (PDF). United States Holocaust Memorial Museum. 2008.
- Westermann, Edward B. (2005). Hitler's Police Battalions: Enforcing Racial War in the East. Kansas City: University Press of Kansas. ISBN 978-0-7006-1724-1.
