= Order Police battalions =

Militarised police units of Nazi Germany

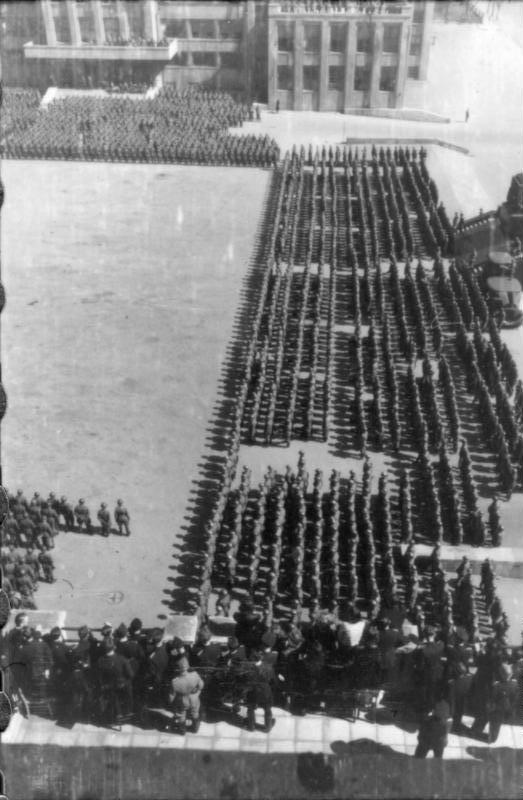
- Police battalions in parade formation, Minsk, occupied Belarus, 1943
- Active: 1939–1945
- Country: Nazi Germany
- Branch: Ordnungspolizei (Order Police, "Orpo")
- Type: Uniformed police
- Role: Participation in the Holocaust; Nazi security warfare
- Size: Battalions
- Part of: Police units under SS command

Order Police battalions were battalion-sized militarised units of Nazi Germany's Ordnungspolizei which existed during World War II from 1939 to 1945. They were subordinated to the Schutzstaffel and deployed in areas of German-occupied Europe, specifically the Army Group Rear Area Commands and territories under civilian administration. Alongside the Einsatzgruppen, Waffen-SS and Wehrmacht, these units were involved in perpetrating the Holocaust and were responsible for large-scale crimes against humanity against civilian populations under German occupation.

== Operational history ==
The Ordnungspolizei (Order Police) was a key instrument of the security apparatus of Nazi Germany. In the prewar period, Heinrich Himmler, the head of the SS, and Kurt Daluege, chief of the Order Police, cooperated in transforming the police force of the Weimar Republic into militarised formations ready to serve the regime's aims of conquest and racial annihilation. In 1938, before the breakout of World War II, the police units participated in the annexation of Austria and the occupation of Czechoslovakia.

=== Invasion of Poland ===
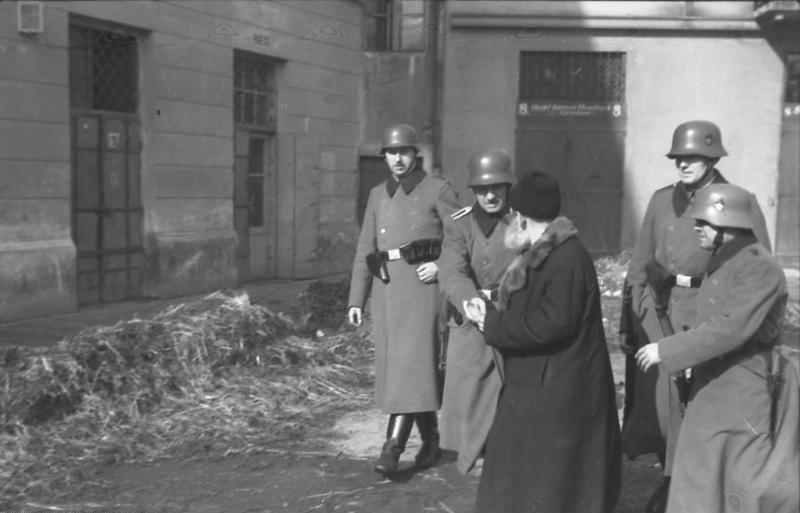
Order Police unit conducting a raid (razzia) in the Kraków ghetto, 1941

Police troops were first formed into battalion-sized formations for the invasion of Poland, where they were deployed for security and policing purposes, also taking part in executions and mass deportations. The first 17 battalion formations were deployed by Orpo in September 1939 along with the Wehrmacht in the invasion of Poland. The battalions guarded Polish prisoners of war and carried out expulsion of Poles from Reichsgau Wartheland under the banner of Lebensraum. They also committed atrocities against both the Catholic and the Jewish populations as part of those "resettlement actions". After hostilities had ceased, the battalions−such as Reserve Police Battalion 101−took up the role of security forces, patrolling the perimeters of the Jewish ghettos in German-occupied Poland (the internal ghetto security issues were managed by the SS, SD, and the Criminal Police, in conjunction with the Jewish ghetto administration).

=== Invasion of the Soviet Union ===
Twenty-three Orpo battalions were slated to take part in the 1941 invasion of the Soviet Union, Operation Barbarossa. Nine were attached to the Wehrmacht security divisions. Two battalions were assigned to support the Einsatzgruppen, the mobile death squads of the SS, and the Organisation Todt, the military construction group. Twelve were formed into regiments, three battalions each, and designated as Police Regiments Centre, North, South, and Police Regiment Special Purpose. The goals of the police battalions were to secure the rear by eliminating the remnants of the enemy forces, guarding the prisoners of war, and protecting the lines of communications and captured industrial facilities. Their instructions also included, as Daluege stated, the "combat of criminal elements, above all political elements".

Comprising about 550 men each, the 300-numbered battalions were raised from recruits mobilised from the 1905–1915 year groups. They were led by career police professionals, steeped in the ideology of Nazism, driven by anti-semitism and anti-Bolshevism. The regiments and battalions were placed under the command of career policemen. When the units crossed the German-Soviet border, they came under the control of the Higher SS and Police Leader (HSS-PF) for the respective Army Group Centre Rear Areas.

== Units ==
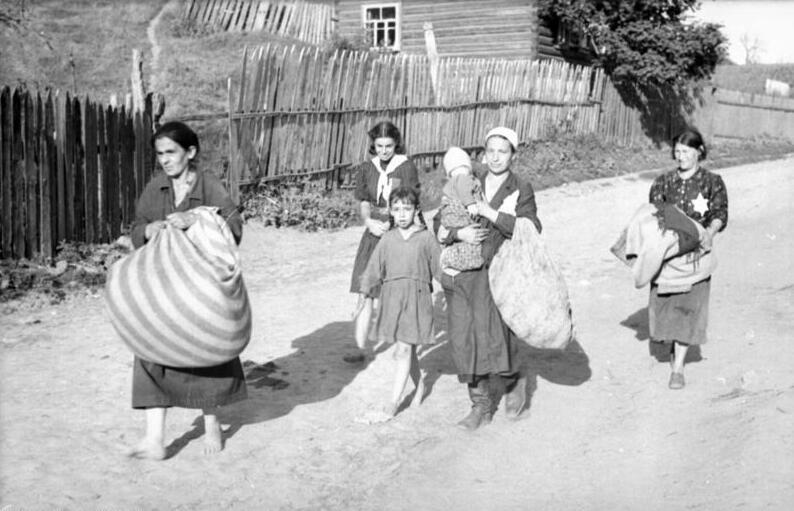
Wehrmacht propaganda photograph of the Jewish women in Mogilev, July 1941. Mogilev Jews were murdered by Police Battalion 322 of Police Regiment Centre in October 1941.

=== Regular police battalions ===
- Police Battalion 9 (attached to Einsatzgruppen)
- Police Battalion 45
- Police Battalion 303
- Police Battalion 304
- Police Battalion 307
- Police Battalion 309
- Police Battalion 314
- Police Battalion 315
- Police Battalion 316
- Police Battalion 320
- Police Battalion 322

=== Reserve police battalions ===
- Reserve Police Battalion 101

== Aftermath ==
The Order Police as a whole had not been declared a criminal organisation by the Allies, unlike the SS, and its members were able to reintegrate into post-war society without legal trouble, with many returning to police careers in Austria and West Germany.

== Bibliography ==
- Arico, Massimo (2010). Ordnungspolizei: Encyclopedia of the German Police Battalions. Stockholm: Leandoer and Ekholm. ISBN 978-91-85657-99-5.
- Beorn, Waitman Wade (2014). Marching into Darkness: The Wehrmacht and the Holocaust in Belarus. Cambridge: Harvard University Press. ISBN 978-0674725508.
- Blood, Phillip W. (2006). Hitler's Bandit Hunters: The SS and the Nazi Occupation of Europe. Potomac Books. ISBN 978-1-59797-021-1.
- Breitman, Richard (1998). Official Secrets: What the Nazis Planned, What the British and Americans Knew. New York: Hill and Wang/Farrar Straus & Giroux. ISBN 9780809001842.
- Curilla, Wolfgang (2010). Der Judenmord in Polen und die deutsche Ordnungspolizei 1939-1945. Paderborn: Schöningh Paderborn. ISBN 978-3-50677043-1.
- Persico, Joseph E. (22 October 2002). Roosevelt's Secret War: FDR and World War II Espionage. Random House. ISBN 0-3757-6126-8.
- Showalter, Dennis (2005). "Foreword". Hitler's Police Battalions: Enforcing Racial War in the East. Kansas City: University Press of Kansas. ISBN 978-0-7006-1724-1.
- Smith, Michael (2004). "Bletchley Park and the Holocaust". In Scott, L. V.; Jackson, P. D. (eds.). Understanding Intelligence in the Twenty-First Century: Journeys in Shadows. ISBN 0714655333.
- Tessin, Georg & Kannapin, Norbert (2000). Waffen-SS und Ordnungspolizei im Kriegseinsatz 1939 - 1945: ein Überblick anhand der Feldpostübersicht. Osnabrück: Biblio-Verlag. ISBN 3-7648-2471-9.
- "Selected Records from the Military Historical Institute Archives, Prague, 1941-1944" (PDF). United States Holocaust Memorial Museum. 2008.
- Westermann, Edward B. (2005). Hitler's Police Battalions: Enforcing Racial War in the East. Kansas City: University Press of Kansas. ISBN 978-0-7006-1724-1.
