= Hermann Franz =

German SS general officer (1891–1969)

- Born: 16 August 1891
- Died: 18 February 1969 (aged 77)
- Military career
- Allegiance: Nazi Germany
- Branch: Order Police
- Service years: 1911–1945
- Rank: SS-Brigadeführer
- Commands: Police Regiment South
- Conflicts: World War I; World War II; Eastern Front

Hermann Franz (16 August 1891 – 18 February 1969) was a high-ranking commander in the police of Nazi Germany. He was the commander of the Police Regiment South, which perpetrated mass murder in the Holocaust in the Army Group South Rear Area. In 1942 he became commander of the 18th Mountain Police Regiment. Subsequently, Franz served as commander of the Ordnungspolizei in Greece and then became Higher SS and Police Leader Greece (Höherer SS- und Polizeiführer Griechenland) in autumn 1944, then commander of the Ordnungspolizei in Norway.

== Police and SS career ==
Franz left the army in 1920. He entered the Saxon state police force and was assigned to an officer course in Dresden. He worked as a policeman in the cities of Plauen and Zwickau and worked as an instructor in a police school. Franz joined the Nazi Party in December 1931 (Membership no. 824526). From 1933 to 1938 he was chief of police in Plauen.

At the beginning of World War II he was part of German occupation of Poland for a short time from September 1939 to October 1939 as Commander of the Order Police at Army Headquarters 8th. In August 1940, he joined the SS in (SS-Nr. 361279). In September 1944 he was promoted Generalmajor der Polizei, and hence gained in October 1944 the rank of SS-Obersturmbannführer

=== The Holocaust in Ukraine ===
Just prior to Operation Barbarossa, the invasion of the Soviet Union, Franz was appointed commander of Police Regiment South. It was formed in June 1941 by combining Order Police Battalions 45, 303, and 314. The regiment was subordinated to Friedrich Jeckeln, the Higher SS and Police Leader (HSSPF) for Army Group South in Ukraine.

The regiment began executing Jewish women and children in July 1941. On 22 July, Police Battalion 314 killed 214 Jews in a settlement near Kovel, including entire families. Police Regiment 45 murdered the entire Jewish population of Shepetovka while stationed there between 26 July and 1 August. The orders came down from Franz, who had referred to an order from Heinrich Himmler.

During August, the regiment murdered Jews in Slavuta, Kowel and other areas, often killing hundreds of victims per battalion per day. On 25 August, it murdered 1,153 Jews, while on 27 August, it killed 914. Later that month, the regiment perpetrated the Kamianets-Podilskyi massacre, alongside Jeckeln's staff company. The staff company did the shooting, while Police Battalion 320 cordoned off the area. The massacres resulted in the murder of thousands of Jews deported from Hungary and rounded up Ukrainian Jews. Shortly thereafter, Police Battalion 320 reported the shooting of twenty-two hundred Jews at another location north-east of Kamianets-Podilskyi. The overall Einsatzgruppen report for the operation listed 23,000 victims.

In September, Police Battalion 45 participated in the murder of Jews in Berdichev, cordoning off the execution site and leading the victims to the pits where they were shot by Jeckeln's staff company. About 16,000 Jews were killed. During the massacre at Baby Yar, the same police battalion cordoned off the area, while Sonderkommando 4a and a platoon of the Waffen-SS did the shooting. Police Battalion 303 participated in the massacre, as well.

=== Later police career ===
In mid-May 1942 he assumed command of the forming 18th Mountain Police Regiment and remained in command until August 1943. From November 1943 to February 1945 he was Commander of the Order Police in Athens. In September 1944, for two months, he was promoted to the Higher SS and Police Leader Greece, and rose in rank to Major General of the Police and SS-Brigadeführer. As Commander of the Order Police, (Ordnungspolizei; Orpo), he was transferred to Oslo, Norway on 7 February 1945 and remained there until the end of the war on 8 May.

In Norway, he was captured by British troops. From 25 September 1945 to 1947 he was a prisoner of war in British captivity. First, starting 9 January 1946, at Island Farm Special Camp 11 from Camp 1 on the outskirts of the town of Bridgend, South Wales. Then he was transferred on 25 November 1947 to the Civil Internment Camp (CIC) at Adelheide, near Delmenhorst. By December 1947 the British released him.

Franz married Frida Schneider on 18 December 1917, they had no children. Hermann Franz died 18 February 1969 in Bonn at the age of 77.

He wrote one book which was printed after his death:

- Gebirgsjäger der Polizei. Polizei-Gebirgsjäger-Regiment 18 und Polizei-Gebirgs-Artillerieabteilung 1942–1945, Bad Nauheim, 1963.
  - Translated his book title is: Mountaineer Police. Police Mountain Infantry Regiment 18 and Police Mountain Artillery Battalion from 1942 to 1945, Publisher: Bad Nauheim in 1963.

== Bibliography ==
- Brandon, Ray; Lower, Wendy (2008). The Shoah in Ukraine: History, Testimony, Memorialization. Indiana University Press. p. 12. ISBN 978-0-253-35084-8.
- Breitman, Richard (1998). Official Secrets: What the Nazis Planned, What the British and Americans Knew. New York: Hill and Wang/Farrar Straus & Giroux. ISBN 0-8090-0184-5.
- Longerich, Peter (2010). Holocaust: The Nazi Persecution and Murder of the Jews. Oxford; New York: Oxford University Press. ISBN 978-0-19-280436-5.
- Yerger, Mark C. (1997). Allgemeine-SS: The Commands, Units and Leaders of the General SS. Atglen, Pennsylvania: Schiffer Publishing. ISBN 0-7643-0145-4.
