= 10th SS Police Regiment =

- Country: Nazi Germany
- Branch: Order Police; Schutzstaffel
- Type: Paramilitary
- Role: Bandenbekämpfung
- Size: Regiment
- Garrison/HQ: Wehrkreis IX

The 10th SS Police Regiment (German: SS-Polizei-Regiment 10) was initially named the 10th Police Regiment (Polizei-Regiment 10) when it was formed in 1942 by the redesignation of Police Regiment South for security warfare in the occupied Soviet Union. It was redesignated as an SS unit in early 1943.

== Formation and organization ==
The regiment was ordered formed in July 1942 in Southern Russia from Police Regiment South. Police Battalion 45, Police Battalion 303 and Police Battalion 314 were redesignated as the regiment's first through third battalions, respectively. All of the police regiments were redesignated as SS police units on 24 February 1943, while retaining its existing organization and strength. On 11 March, the 10th Police Panzer Company was formed with two platoons of ex-French Panhard 178 armored cars and a platoon of captured Soviet tanks, but there were no tanks available. The company was transferred to Russia to join the regiment shortly afterwards. It was attached to the 11th SS Police Regiment in June and never returned to the 10th Regiment. In July 1944, the regiment was stationed in Eastern Italy and Slovenia for security operations and it had been reinforced by an artillery battery and a cavalry squadron.
