= Kamianets-Podilskyi massacre =

World War II mass shooting of Jews in Soviet Ukraine

Coordinates: 48°41′00″N 26°35′00″E

- Jews marched through Kamenets to their execution site on the outskirts of town
- Location: Kamianets-Podilskyi
- Date: August 27–28, 1941
- Perpetrators: Friedrich Jeckeln; Einsatzgruppen; Police Battalion 320; Royal Hungarian Army; Ukrainian Auxiliary Police
- Victims: 23,600 Hungarian and Ukrainian Jews

The Kamianets-Podilskyi massacre was a World War II mass shooting of Jews carried out in the opening stages of Operation Barbarossa, by the German Police Battalion 320 along with Friedrich Jeckeln's Einsatzgruppen, Hungarian soldiers, and the Ukrainian Auxiliary Police. The killings were conducted on August 27 and August 28, 1941, in the Soviet city of Kamianets-Podilskyi (now Ukraine), occupied by German troops in the previous month on July 11, 1941. According to the Nazi German reports a total of 23,600 Jews were murdered, including 16,000 who had earlier been expelled from Hungary.

== History ==
The city of Kamianets-Podilskyi (Kam'yanets'-Podil's'kyy), now in south-western Ukraine, was part of the Ukrainian SSR invaded by German forces on June 22, 1941, during the opening stages of Operation Barbarossa launched from occupied Poland. Shortly after Hungary (Germany's ally) engaged in war on the Soviet Union on June 27, 1941, officials of the agency responsible for the foreign nationals living in Hungary decided to deport foreign Jews; these were mostly Polish and Russian Jews, but there were also many refugees from western Europe. Jews who could not readily establish Hungarian citizenship were equally vulnerable to deportation. As a result, many Hungarian Jews who could not document their citizenship were also deported. Many Jewish communities, especially in Governorate of Subcarpathia (then as part of Hungary), were deported in their entirety.

The Hungarian deportation plans also targeted itinerant Roma. On 10 July 1941, Miklós Kozma, the regent’s commissioner in Transcarpathia, informed Prime Minister László Bárdossy that he intended to expel Roma along with other groups. A report received by the Hungarian Ministry of the Interior on 18 July described expulsions of itinerant Roma as already underway. Drawing on this report, other official documents and population data, historian Anders E. B. Blomqvist estimates that approximately 1,000 Roma were deported from Transcarpathia to German-occupied territory in 1941.

The Hungarians loaded the Jews into freight cars and took them to Kőrösmező (now Yasinia, Ukraine), near the prewar Czechoslovak-Polish border, where they were transferred across the former Soviet border and handed over to the Germans. By August 10, 1941, approximately 14,000 Jews had been deported from Hungary to German-controlled territory. Once in German hands, the Jews, often still in family units, were forced to march from Kolomyia to Kamianets-Podilskyi.

On August 27 and 28, a detachment of Einsatzgruppen (mobile killing units) in Kamianets-Podilskyi and troops under the command of the Higher SS and Police Leader for the southern region, SS General Friedrich Jeckeln, carried out mass murder of the entire Jewish community including both deportees and locals. According to Jeckeln's report, a total of 23,600 Jews were massacred in this action. It was one of the first large-scale mass murder operations in pursuit of the Final Solution in Reichskommissariat Ukraine. Within the Soviet Union grounds, it was preceded by a similar killing spree which began on July 9, 1941, and continued until September 19, in the city of Zhytomyr (made Judenfrei) with three mass-murder operations conducted by German and Ukrainian police in which 10,000 Jews perished. It was followed by the killing of 28,000 Jews shot by SS and the Ukrainian paramilitary in Vinnytsia on September 22, 1941, and the September 29 massacre of 33,771 Jews at Babi Yar.by the end of 1941, between 500,000 and 900,000 Jews had been killed.

== Deportation of Roma ==
Blomqvist distinguishes the evidence for the deportation of Roma from the less conclusive evidence concerning their subsequent fate. His study identifies only circumstantial evidence that Roma were among those killed in the August 1941 massacre; the surviving reports do not explicitly identify Romani victims. German killings of Roma at Kamianets-Podilskyi are explicitly documented in 1942, including in a letter written by gendarmerie officer Fritz Jacob on 21 June 1942. The letter does not establish whether the victims included Roma deported from Hungary in 1941.

== See also ==
- Einsatzgruppen
- Friedrich Jeckeln
- Media related to Kamianets-Podilskyi massacre at Wikimedia Commons
