= Police Regiment Centre =

Security unit of Nazi Germany

- Polizei-Regiment Mitte
- Active: 1941–1942
- Country: Nazi Germany
- Role: Participation in the Holocaust; Nazi security warfare
- Size: Regiment
- Part of: Order Police under SS command, reporting directly to Higher SS and Police Leader, Central Russia

Commanders
- Notable commanders: Max Montua; Walter Schimana

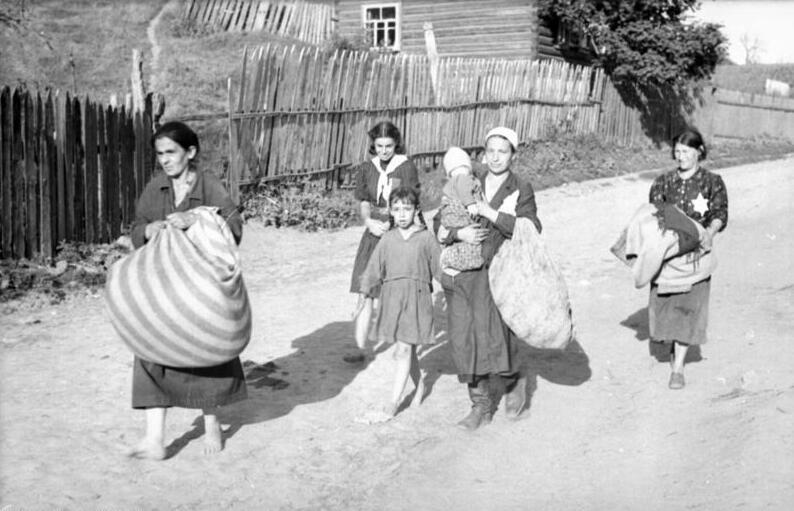
Wehrmacht propaganda photograph of Jewish women and children in Mogilev, July 1941. Six thousand Mogilev Jews were murdered by SS forces and Police Regiment Centre's Police Battalions 316 and 322 in October 1941.

The Police Regiment Centre (Polizei-Regiment Mitte) was a formation of the Order Police (uniformed police) during the Nazi era. During Operation Barbarossa, it was subordinated to the Schutzstaffel (SS) and deployed in German-occupied areas, specifically the Army Group Centre Rear Area, of the Soviet Union. In mid-1942, its three constituent battalions were reassigned and the unit was re-designated as the 13th Police Regiment.

Alongside detachments from the Einsatzgruppen and the SS Cavalry Brigade, it perpetrated mass murders and was responsible for large-scale crimes against humanity targeting civilian populations in the course of Nazi security warfare. The scope of the regiment's operations had been known to British intelligence since July 1941, but, for reasons of national security, information pertaining to their activities was not released until 1993.

== Background and formation ==
The German Order Police (uniformed police) was a key instrument of the security apparatus of Nazi Germany. In the prewar period, Heinrich Himmler, the head of the SS, and Kurt Daluege, chief of the Order Police, cooperated in transforming the police force of the Weimar Republic into militarised formations ready to serve the regime's aims of conquest and racial annihilation. The police units participated in the annexation of Austria and the occupation of Czechoslovakia. Police troops were first formed into battalion-sized formations for the invasion of Poland, where they were deployed for security and policing purposes, also taking part in executions and mass deportations.

Twenty-three Order Police battalions were slated to take part in the 1941 invasion of the Soviet Union, Operation Barbarossa. Nine were attached to security divisions of the Wehrmacht, three for each Army Group Rear Areas. Two battalions were assigned to support the Einsatzgruppen, the mobile death squads of the SS, and the Organisation Todt, the military construction group. Twelve were formed into regiments, three battalions each, and designated as Police Regiments Centre, North, South, and Special Purpose.

Police units assigned to the Wehrmacht security divisions and the Einsatzgruppen were motorised, while those formed into regiments were not. The goals of the Order Police battalions were to secure the rear by eliminating the remnants of the enemy forces, guarding the prisoners of war, and protecting the lines of communications and captured industrial facilities. Their instructions also included, as Daluege stated, the "combat of criminal elements, above all political elements".

Police Regiment Centre was formed in June 1941 by combining Police Battalions 307, 316, and 322, each comprising about 550 men. These battalions were raised from recruits mobilised from the 1905–1915 year groups. They were led by career police professionals, steeped in the ideology of Nazism, driven anti-semitism and anti-Bolshevism. The unit was placed under the command of Max Montua, a career policeman. When it crossed the German-Soviet border, the regiment came under the control of Erich von dem Bach-Zelewski, the Higher SS and Police Leader (HSS-PF) for Army Group Centre.

== Operational history ==
=== Early killing operations ===
Himmler made a personal visit to the headquarters of the unit in Białystok on 8 July where he met with Max von Schenckendorff, commander of Army Group Centre Rear Area, Daluege, Montua, Bach-Zalewski, and the regiment's officers. He expressed concern that too few Jews had been rounded up and called on the officers to increase their efforts. It was likely that Himmler had ordered increased killings since several massacres followed immediately after.

The same evening, a company of Police Battalion 322 participated in the shooting of about 1,000 Jews under the direction of Einsatzgruppe B. The next day, 9 July, Police Battalion 307 participated in the massacre of 4–6,000 Jewish men, Russians and Belarusians in the vicinity of Brest-Litovsk (now Brest, Belarus). The killing operation, with assistance by personnel of the Wehrmacht's 162nd Infantry Division, lasted several days. On 10 July, Daluege addressed the members of the regiment arrayed in a parade formation, extolling them to "exterminate" Bolshevism as a "blessing for Germany". On 11 July, Montua passed a confidential order from Bach-Zalewski to the battalion commanders that Jews, who had been "convicted of looting", were to be shot; an execution took place the same day. Around this time, Police Battalions 316 and 322 rounded up approximately 3,000 Jewish men from Białystok and shot them in a nearby forest.

On 17 July, the regiment murdered over 1,100 Jews in Slonim, with Bach-Zalewski reporting to Himmler on 18 July: "Yesterday's cleansing action in Slonim by Police Regiment Centre. 1,153 Jewish plunderers were shot". By 20 July, the unit's reports referred to executions of Jewish women and children. By late August, Police Battalion 322 moved to Minsk, where, on 1 September, it conducted a killing operation together with the units of Einsatzgruppe B. The victims included 290 Jewish men and 40 Jewish women.

=== Escalation of violence ===
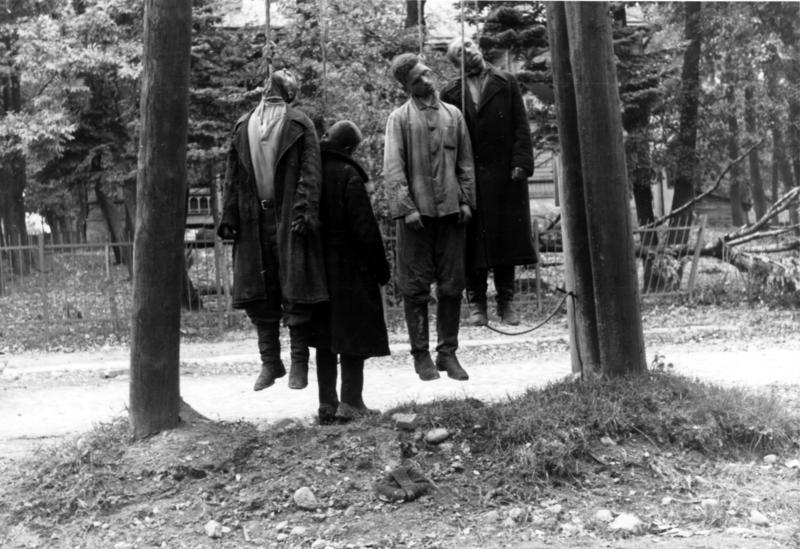
Victims hanged by the police troops in the Soviet Union, August/September 1941

In September 1941, the regiment participated in the Mogilev conference, organised by General Max von Schenckendorff, commander of the Army Group Centre Rear Area. Montua had been in charge of the event's planning and logistics. The conference included three field exercises. On the second day, participants travelled to a nearby settlement where a company of Police Battalion 322, assisted by the troops of the SD, conducted a demonstration of how to surround and screen a village. According to the after-action report, "suspicious strangers" (Ortsfremde) or "partisans" could not be found. The screening of the population revealed fifty-one Jewish civilians, of whom thirty-two were shot.

On 2 October 1941, Police Battalions 322 and 316, along with Bach-Zalewski's staff company and Ukrainian auxiliaries, rounded up 2,200 Jews in the Mogilev Ghetto. Sixty-five were killed during the roundups, and another 550 executed the next day. Throughout the rest of the month, the battalion continued to execute Jews, communists, and alleged partisans in the vicinity of Mogilev. The commander of the unit received the Iron Cross, 2nd class, following these operations. Another killing operation later that month, by Einsatzkommando 8 and Police Battalions 316 and 322, brought the total number of victims in Mogilev to about 6,000.

On 7–8 November, Police Battalion 316 participated in the murder of Jews in Bobruisk. The inmates of the Bobruisk ghetto were rounded up and loaded into trucks. They were taken to the village of Kamenka where they were shot into pits dug for this purpose. About 5,281 people were killed by the personnel of the battalion and the Einsatzkommando 8.

=== Later history ===
In December, after the German defeat in the Battle of Moscow, the regiment was sent to the front lines to reinforce the German defenses, thus depriving Bach-Zalewski of manpower. Police Battalion 307, for example, was deployed near Kaluga on 20 December and had been reduced to a combat strength of 60 men by March. The other two battalions were assigned to guard and security duties to the immediate rear of the front-line troops and were not heavily involved in combat. The regimental commander, Montua, was recalled to Germany to assume an SS and police training position and was replaced by Colonel of Police (Oberst der Polizei) Walter Schimana on 1 December. Bach-Zalewski himself was temporarily relieved of command and sent to Germany for recuperation. Around May–June 1942, the battalions were replaced by Police Battalions 6, 85 and 301, which were redesignated as the regiment's first through third battalions, respectively. The regiment was redesignated in July as the 13th Police Regiment.

== Decrypts by British intelligence ==
Progress reports on the murderous activities of the Police Regiment Center, the Einsatzgruppen detachment and the SS Cavalry Brigade were regularly forwarded by Bach-Zalewski. However, unbeknownst to him, the reports were being intercepted by MI6, the British intelligence service, whose code breakers at Bletchley Park had broken the German ciphers as part of Ultra, the British signals intelligence program.

The head of MI6, Stewart Menzies, communicated the decrypts directly to British Prime Minister Winston Churchill. The first decrypted message was the 18 July report on the mass murders by the regiment at Slonim. In late July and early August, similar reports were intercepted on a regular basis. Angered by the scope of the atrocities, Churchill delivered a speech over the radio on 24 August stating:

Whole districts are being exterminated (...) Scores of thousands of executions are perpetrated by the German police troops upon the Soviet patriots defending their native soil. Since the Mongol invasion of Europe, there have never been methodical, merciless butchery on such a scale or approaching such a scale. We are in the presence of a crime without a name.

From 27 August, Bletchley Park delivered specially prepared daily intelligence reports on the activities of the police troops. By this point, the British intelligence had detailed information on the activities of both Bach-Zalewski's and Friedrich Jeckeln's formations (with Jeckeln operating in Army Group South Rear Area). On 12 September, the German Police changed their cipher; the following day, the SS officials were instructed to stop transmitting the reports over the radio. Subsequently, the code breakers produced monthly reports detailing the crimes perpetrated by Nazi Germany.

== Aftermath ==
Police Battalions 307, 316, and 322 were reassigned to other regiments and continued to engage in security warfare (Bandenbekämpfung, or "bandit-fighting") and genocide. Battalion 307 was assigned to the 23rd Police Regiment and took part in the punitive Operation Sumpffieber in Belarus. Battalions 316 and 322 were sent to Slovenia, with Battalion 316 then assigned to the 4th Police Regiment in France and Battalion 322 joining the 5th Police Regiment, still in Slovenia. The regiment's former commander, Montua, committed suicide in April 1945.

The Order Police as a whole had not been declared a criminal organisation by the Allies, unlike the SS, and its members were able to reintegrate into the German society largely unmolested, with many returning to police careers in Austria and West Germany. Personnel of Police Battalion 322 were investigated by the West German authorities in the 1960s. One of the battalion's members stated:

The expression 'combat of the partisans' is strictly speaking a complete misnomer. We did not have a single battle with partisans after we left Mogilev. ... The fact of the matter [was] that those found without identity cards sufficed for their arrest and executions".

For reasons of national security, the Ultra program remained classified after the war and the decrypts pertaining to the activities of security and police troops during the war were not shared with Britain's allies. Consequently, they were not used during the Nuremberg trials or subsequent investigations of German war crimes and crimes against humanity. The decrypts were finally released in 1993.

== Bibliography ==
- Arico, Massimo (2010). Ordnungspolizei: Encyclopedia of the German Police Battalions. Stockholm: Leandoer and Ekholm. ISBN 978-91-85657-99-5.
- Beorn, Waitman Wade (2014). Marching into Darkness: The Wehrmacht and the Holocaust in Belarus. Cambridge: Harvard University Press. ISBN 978-0674725508.
- Blood, Phillip W. (2006). Hitler's Bandit Hunters: The SS and the Nazi Occupation of Europe. Potomac Books. ISBN 978-1-59797-021-1.
- Breitman, Richard (1998). Official Secrets: What the Nazis Planned, What the British and Americans Knew. New York: Hill and Wang/Farrar Straus & Giroux. ISBN 978-0-80900-184-2.
- Curilla, Wolfgang (2010). Der Judenmord in Polen und die deutsche Ordnungspolizei 1939-1945. Paderborn: Schöningh Paderborn. ISBN 978-3-50677043-1.
- Megargee, Geoffrey P., ed. (2009). Encyclopedia of Camps and Ghettos, 1933–1945. Vol. II. Bloomington: Indiana University Press. ISBN 978-0-253-35328-3.
- Nix, Phil & Jerome, Georges (2006). The Uniformed Police Forces of the Third Reich 1933–1945 (2nd ed.). Stockholm: Leandoer & Ekholm. ISBN 91-975894-3-8.
- Persico, Joseph E. (2002). Roosevelt's Secret War: FDR and World War II Espionage. Random House. ISBN 0-3757-6126-8.
- Showalter, Dennis (2005). "Foreword". Hitler's Police Battalions: Enforcing Racial War in the East. Kansas City: University Press of Kansas. ISBN 978-0-7006-1724-1.
- Smith, Michael (2004). "Bletchley Park and the Holocaust". In Scott, L. V. & Jackson, P. D. (eds.). Understanding Intelligence in the Twenty-First Century: Journeys in Shadows. Routledge. ISBN 0714655333.
- Tessin, Georg & Kannapin, Norbert (2000). Waffen-SS und Ordnungspolizei im Kriegseinsatz 1939 - 1945: ein Überblick anhand der Feldpostübersicht. Osnabrück: Biblio-Verlag. ISBN 3-7648-2471-9.
- "Selected Records from the Military Historical Institute Archives, Prague, 1941-1944" (PDF). United States Holocaust Memorial Museum. 2008.
- Westermann, Edward B. (2005). Hitler's Police Battalions: Enforcing Racial War in the East. Kansas City: University Press of Kansas. ISBN 978-0-7006-1724-1.
