= Police Regiment South =

- Polizei-Regiment Süd
- Active: 1941–1942
- Country: Nazi Germany
- Role: Rear-area security; participation in the Holocaust
- Size: Regiment
- Part of: Order Police units under SS command, controlled by Higher SS and Police Leader, South Russia

Commanders
- Notable commanders: Hermann Franz

The Police Regiment South (Polizei-Regiment Süd) was a formation of the German Order Police, the German national uniformed police force, during the Nazi era. During Operation Barbarossa, it was subordinated to the Schutzstaffel (SS) and deployed in German-occupied territories, specifically the Army Group South Rear Area. In July 1942, its three constituent battalions were redesignated as the 10th Police Regiment.

Alongside the Einsatzgruppen detachments and the 1st SS Infantry Brigade, it perpetrated mass murder in the Holocaust and was responsible for large-scale crimes against humanity targeting the civilian population. The scope of the regiment's operations was known to British intelligence from August 1941, but for reasons of national security these materials were not released until 1993.

== Background and formation ==
The German Order Police (Ordnungspolizei) was a key instrument of the security apparatus of Nazi Germany. In the prewar period, Heinrich Himmler, the head of the SS, and Kurt Daluege, chief of the Order Police, cooperated in transforming the police force of the Weimar Republic into militarised formations ready to serve the regime's aims of conquest and racial annihilation. Order police units participated in the annexation of Austria and the occupation of Czechoslovakia. Police troops were first formed into battalion-sized formations for the invasion of Poland, where they were deployed for security and policing purposes, also taking part in executions and mass deportations.

Twenty three Order Police battalions were slated to take part in the 1941 invasion of the Soviet Union, known as Operation Barbarossa. Nine were attached to security divisions of the Wehrmacht, three for each Army Group Rear Area. Two battalions were assigned to support the Einsatzgruppen, the mobile death squads of the SS, and the Organisation Todt, the military construction group. Twelve were formed into regiments, of three battalions each, and designated as Police Regiments South, North, Centre, and Special Purpose.

Police units assigned to the Wehrmacht security divisions and the Einsatzgruppen were motorised, while those formed into regiments were not. The goals of the police battalions were to secure the German army's rear-area by eliminating the remnants of enemy forces, guarding prisoners of war, and protecting lines of communications and captured industrial facilities. Their instructions also included, as Daluege stated, the "combat of criminal elements, above all political elements".

Police Regiment South was formed in June 1941 by combining Police Battalions 45, 303, and 314 under the command of Hermann Franz, a career policeman who had previously served in the Order Police in occupied Poland. The battalions were led by career police professionals, steeped in the ideology of Nazism, driven by anti-semitism and anti-Bolshevism. When it crossed the German-Soviet border the regiment came under the control of Friedrich Jeckeln, the Higher SS and Police Leader (HSS-PF) for Army Group South in Ukraine.

== Operational history ==
=== Early killing operations ===
Upon formation, while still in occupied Poland, Police Battalion 314 participated in round-ups of Polish civilians for deportation to slave labour in Germany. The regiment's actions quickly escalated to genocide when in the occupied Soviet Union. It began executing Jewish women and children in July 1941. On 22 July, Police Battalion 314 killed 214 Jews in a settlement near Kovel, including entire families. Police Regiment 45 murdered the entire Jewish population of Shepetovka while stationed there between 26 July and 1 August. The orders came down from the regimental commander, who was acting on orders from Heinrich Himmler.

During the summer months, the battalion took part in joint actions with the 1st SS Infantry Brigade of the Waffen-SS, both providing support and undertaking independent killings. The brigade's report of 19 August to the Command Staff Reichsführer-SS (SS operational staff set up for the invasion) noted that Police Battalion 314 had executed 25 Jews and 16 Ukrainians. The same report noted that Police Battalions 45 and 303 and the SS brigade jointly participated in "combat of gangs". The 22 August report stated that Police Battalion 314 shot 3 "partisan women", 19 "bandits", and 537 Jews. The 21 August report detailed the battalion's killing of 367 Jews in a "cleansing action" while securing German supply lines, while the 22 August report noted that the unit executed 28 Ukrainians on charges of "arson". In the last week of August the battalion killed a further 294 Jews.

=== Escalation of violence ===
During August, the regiment murdered Jews in Slavuta, Kovel and other areas, often killing hundreds of victims per battalion per day. On 25 August, it murdered 1,153 Jews, while on 27 August, it killed 914 more.

In September, Police Battalion 45 participated in the murder of Jews in Berdichev, cordoning off the execution site and leading the victims to pits where they were shot by Jeckeln's staff company. About 16,000 Jews were killed. In late September, Police Battalions 45 and 314 assisted Einsatzkommando 6 in murdering 10,000 Jews in Vinnitsa.

During the massacre at Babi Yar on 29–30 September 1941, the personnel of Police Battalion 45 cordoned off the area, while Sondercommando 4a and a platoon of Waffen-SS men did the shooting. Police Battalion 303 participated in the massacre as well.

=== Later history ===
The killing activities of both the Einsatzgruppen detachments and the Police Regiment South slowed down the farther the Wehrmacht advanced, as more Jews were able to escape east and the density of the pre-war Jewish population was lower in Eastern Ukraine. Nonetheless, the murder operations continued, targeting Jews, communists and "suspicious elements". In July 1942 the regiment was redesignated as the 10th Police Regiment.

== Decrypts by British intelligence ==
While the activities of the Police Regiment South, the Einsatzgruppen detachment, and the 1st SS Brigade progressed, the reports by the murder squads were being intercepted and decoded by MI6, the British intelligence service. As part of Ultra, a British signals intelligence program, the codebreaking facilities at Bletchley Park decoded and analysed the messages. The head of MI6, Stewart Menzies, communicated the decrypts directly to the British Prime Minister Winston Churchill. The first message decrypted was the 18 July report on the mass murders by Police Regiment Centre of over 1,100 Jews at Slonim, in the Army Group Centre Rear Area. In late July and early August, similar reports were intercepted on a regular basis. The first messages mentioning the murders by Police Regiment South were intercepted on August 23, with Police Battalion 314 reporting executions of 367 Jews south-east of Kiev. Apparently angered by the scope of the atrocities, Churchill delivered a speech over the radio on August 24, where he stated:

Whole districts are being exterminated... Scores of thousands of executions are perpetrated by the German police troops upon the Soviet patriots defending their native soil. Since the Mongol invasion of Europe, there have never been methodical, merciless butchery on such a scale or approaching such a scale. We are in the presence of a crime without a name.

Starting on 27 August, Bletchley Park delivered specially prepared intelligence reports on the activities of the police troops. By this point, the British intelligence had detailed information on the activities of police troops in both Army Group South and Army Group Centre rear areas. On 12 September, the Order Police changed their cipher; the following day, SS officials were instructed to stop transmitting their reports over the radio.

== Aftermath ==
The Order Police as a whole had not been declared a criminal organisation by the Allies, unlike the SS. Its members were able to reintegrate into German society largely unmolested, with many returning to police careers in Austria and West Germany. Members of Police Battalion 314 were investigated by the Austrian authorities, with at least two former members providing testimony on the mass killings of Jews. One former member testified that the killing method changed from using sidearms and carbines to machine guns since the former was deemed "too tedious".

For reasons of national security, the Ultra program remained classified after the war and the decrypts pertaining to the activities of security and police troops during the war were not shared with Britain's allies. Consequently, they were not used during the Nuremberg trials or subsequent investigations of German war crimes and crimes against humanity. The decrypts were finally released in 1993.

== Bibliography ==
- Brandon, Ray & Lower, Wendy (2008). The Shoah in Ukraine: History, Testimony, Memorialization. Bloomington: Indiana University Press. ISBN 978-0-253-35084-8.
- Breitman, Richard (1998). Official Secrets: What the Nazis Planned, What the British and Americans Knew. New York: Hill and Wang/Farrar Straus & Giroux. p. 46. ISBN 9780809001842. "police regiment center."
- Browning, Christopher (2004). The Origins of the Final Solution: The Evolution of Nazi Jewish Policy, September 1939 – March 1942. With contributions by Jürgen Matthäus. Lincoln: University of Nebraska Press. ISBN 0-803-25979-4.
- Longerich, Peter (2010). Holocaust: The Nazi Persecution and Murder of the Jews. New York: Oxford University Press. ISBN 978-0-19-280436-5.
- Showalter, Dennis (2005). "Foreword". Hitler's Police Battalions: Enforcing Racial War in the East. Kansas City: University Press of Kansas. ISBN 978-0-7006-1724-1.
- Smith, Michael (2004). "Bletchley Park and the Holocaust". In Scott, L. V. & Jackson, P. D. (eds.). Understanding Intelligence in the Twenty-First Century: Journeys in Shadows. london. ISBN 0714655333.
- Tessin, Georg & Kannapin, Norbert (2000). Waffen-SS und Ordnungspolizei im Kriegseinsatz 1939 - 1945: ein Überblick anhand der Feldpostübersicht. Osnabrück: Biblio-Verlag. ISBN 3-7648-2471-9.
- Westermann, Edward B. (2005). Hitler's Police Battalions: Enforcing Racial War in the East. Kansas City: University Press of Kansas. ISBN 978-0-7006-1724-1.
