= Wendy Lower =

American historian

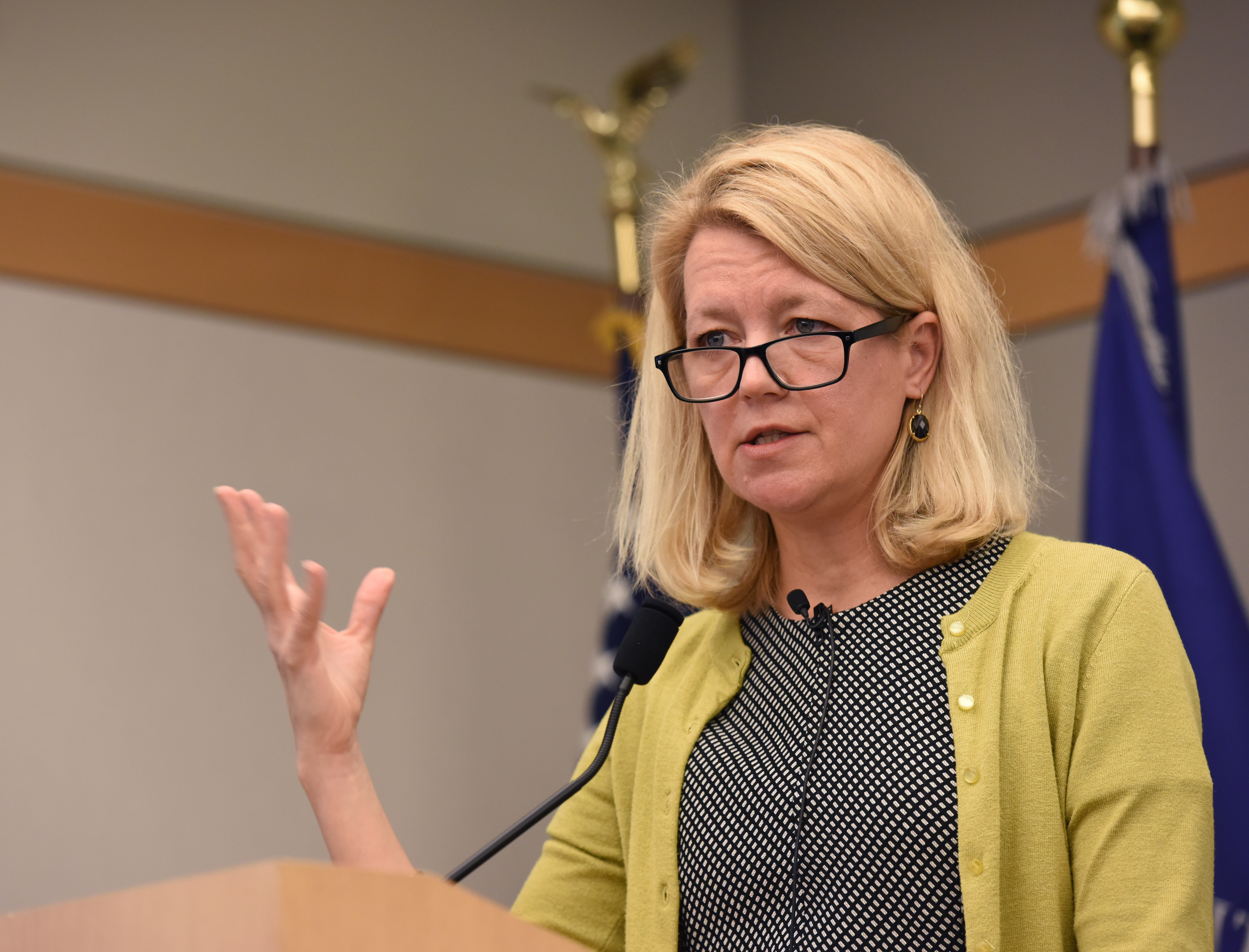
- Born: 1965 (age 60–61); United States

Academic background
- Education: American University

Academic work
- Era: 20th century
- Institutions: Claremont McKenna College; United States Holocaust Memorial Museum; LMU Munich
- Main interests: Modern European history: World War II; Holocaust

Wendy Lower (born 1965) is an American historian and an author on the Holocaust and World War II. Since 2012, she holds the John K. Roth Chair at Claremont McKenna College in Claremont, California, and in 2014 was named the director of the Mgrublian Center for Human Rights at Claremont. From 2016, she served as the interim director of the Jack, Joseph and Morton Mandel Center for Advanced Holocaust Studies at the United States Holocaust Memorial Museum in Washington, DC.

Lower's research areas include the history of Germany and Ukraine in World War II, the Holocaust, women's history, the history of human rights, and comparative genocide studies. Her 2013 book, Hitler's Furies: German Women in the Nazi Killing Fields, was translated into 21 languages and was a finalist for the 2013 National Book Award in the nonfiction category and for the National Jewish Book Award. Lower's The Ravine: A Family, A Photograph, A Holocaust Massacre Revealed (2021) received the National Jewish Book Award in the Holocaust category.

== Early life and education ==
Lower was born in 1965. She earned a BA from Hamilton College in 1987 and a PhD in European History in 1999 from the American University in Washington, DC.

== Career ==
From 2000 to 2004, Lower was the director of the visiting scholars programs at the United States Holocaust Memorial Museum (USHMM). She was an assistant professor at Towson University in Maryland from 2004 to 2007. For the next five years she lived in Germany and worked at the Historical Seminar of LMU Munich as a research associate while serving as director of oral history research for the USHMM from 2010 to 2012. Lower was an associate professor at the Strassler Family Center for Holocaust and Genocide Studies at Clark University for the 2011-2012 academic year. Since 2012, she holds the John K. Roth Chair at Claremont McKenna College in California. In 2014 Lower was named the director of the Mgrublian Center for Human Rights at Claremont. As of 2016, she serves as the interim director of the Jack, Joseph and Morton Mandel Center for Advanced Holocaust Studies at the United States Holocaust Memorial Museum in Washington, DC.

=== Research ===
Lower's work, Nazi Empire Building and the Holocaust in Ukraine, won the 2007 award from Choice, and the Baker-Burton Award of the Southern Historical Association for the best first work in European history. The work traces the history of Ukraine in World War II after that drive to establish German colonies under SS-Reichsfuhrer Heinrich Himmler and the complex role of German bureaucrats, the military, and the local population in the implementation of the Holocaust. Lower considers arrogance, fear, jealousy, and Slavic and Communist as the central declarations for the imperial policy of the Nazis in Eastern Europe. The research in the archives of Zhytomyr, which was part of the German Reichskommissariat Ukraine from 1941 to 1944, also led Lower to her next project: exploring the role of the German women in the Nazi genocidal policies in occupied Poland and Soviet Union. Isabel Kershner in The New York Times finds that Lower's research "sheds new light on the Holocaust from a gender perspective, according to experts, and have further underlined the importance of the role of the lower echelons in the Nazi killing apparatus."

Lower's resulting work, Hitler's Furies: German Women in the Nazi Killing Fields, was published in English in 2013 and then translated into 21 languages. In the book, Lower looks at nearly 500,000 women in World War II including women in Poland, Ukraine, Belarus, Estonia, Latvia, and Lithuania. She examines their attempts to carry out their objectives to "conquer Slavic peoples ... and the murder of its Jews" and addresses the question of why these female perpetrators were not brought to justice after the war. In the United States, the book was a finalist for the National Book Award in the nonfiction category and for the National Jewish Book Award. The Guardian called the book "truly chilling" but was ambivalent on the presentation: on the one hand the reviewer finds that Lower has astutely communicated the physical and moral landscape of the time, on the other hand, her study did not include professional killers inside the Reich Security Main Office and in the SS.

== Selected works ==
- Nazi Empire Building and the Holocaust in the Ukraine. Chapel Hill: University of North Carolina Press. 2005. ISBN 0-8078-2960-9.
- with Brandon, Ray, eds. (2008). The Shoah in Ukraine: History, Testimony, Memorialization. Bloomington: Indiana University Press. ISBN 9780253001597.
- The Diary of Samuel Golfard and the Holocaust in Eastern Galicia. Lanham: AltaMira Press. 2011. ISBN 978-0759120785. (Review)
- Hitler's Furies: German Women in the Nazi Killing Fields. Houghton Mifflin Harcourt, Boston 2013, ISBN 978-0-547-86338-2 .
- The Ravine: A Family, a Photograph, a Holocaust Massacre Revealed. Houghton Mifflin Harcourt, Boston 2021 ISBN 978-0544828698 .

=== Anthologies ===
- With Lower, Wendy; Brandon, Ray, eds. (2010). The Shoah in Ukraine: History, Testimony, Memorialization. Bloomington: Indiana University Press. ISBN 978-0253222688.
- With Rossi, Lauren Faulkner, eds. (2017). Lessons and Legacies XII: New Directions in Holocaust Research and Education. Evanston: Northwestern University Press. doi:10.2307/j.ctv47w5zs.
- With Ben, Kiernan; Naimark, Norman; Straus, Scott, eds. (2023). Genocide in the Contemporary Era, 1914–2020 (= The Cambridge World History of Genocide. Band III). Cambridge: Cambridge University Press. doi:10.1017/9781108767118.
