= Kurt Daluege =

German SS general and police official (1897–1946)

- Daluege in 1936

Protector of Bohemia and Moravia
- Acting
- In office 5 June 1942 – 24 August 1943
- Appointed by: Adolf Hitler
- Preceded by: Reinhard Heydrich (acting)
- Succeeded by: Wilhelm Frick

Deputy Protector of Bohemia and Moravia
- In office 5 June 1942 – 24 August 1943
- Protector: Konstantin von Neurath
- Preceded by: Reinhard Heydrich
- Succeeded by: Position abolished

Chief of the Ordnungspolizei
- In office 26 June 1936 – 31 August 1943
- Leader: Heinrich Himmler as Chief of the German Police
- Preceded by: Office established
- Succeeded by: Alfred Wünnenberg

Personal details
- Born: Kurt Max Franz Daluege; 15 September 1897 Kreuzburg, Upper Silesia, German Empire (now Poland)
- Died: 24 October 1946 (aged 49) Pankrác Prison, Czechoslovakia
- Cause of death: Execution by hanging
- Party: Nazi Party
- Spouse: Käthe Schwarz (m. 1926)
- Children: 4
- Education: Civil engineering
- Alma mater: Technische Universität Berlin
- Civilian awards: Golden Party Badge

Military service
- Allegiance: German Empire
- Branch/service: Imperial German Army: Prussian Army
- Rank: Vizefeldwebel
- Unit: 7th Guards Infantry Regiment
- Battles/wars: World War I: Western Front; Eastern Front
- Military awards: Iron Cross, 2nd class Wound Badge
- Criminal information
- Known for: Lidice massacre
- Status: Executed
- Conviction: Crimes against humanity
- Penalty: Death

Kurt Daluege (15 September 1897 – 24 October 1946) was a high-ranking German police and SS official who served as chief of Ordnungspolizei (Order Police; Orpo) of Nazi Germany from 1936 to 1943, as well as the Deputy/Acting Protector of Bohemia and Moravia from 1942 to 1943. He was subsequently convicted of crimes against humanity and hanged.

Daluege served in the Prussian Army during the First World War on both fronts. He was severely wounded and received the Iron Cross, second class. After the war, he became a member of Gerhard Roßbach's Freikorps. In 1922, Daluege joined the Nazi Party and soon entered the Sturmabteilung (SA), eventually becoming the SA leader in Berlin. He transferred to the SS in 1930 and was later elected as a Reichstag deputy. In 1933, Hermann Göring appointed Daluege to the Prussian Interior Ministry and placed him in charge of the Prussian police forces. In that position, he played an important role in carrying out the Night of the Long Knives, in which Ernst Röhm and other leading members of the SA were murdered. By late 1934, his authority was extended to include all of Germany, and two years later Heinrich Himmler named him chief of the Ordnungspolizei (Order Police; Orpo) following the reorganisation of the German police force.

By the outbreak of the Second World War, Daluege's organisation had as many as 120,000 active-duty personnel. Its militarised Order Police battalions took part in policing, deportations and mass murder throughout German-occupied Europe and had an integral role in carrying out the Holocaust and other mass killings. Following Reinhard Heydrich's assassination in 1942, Daluege was named Deputy Protector of Bohemia and Moravia and directed the German reprisal actions, including the Lidice massacre. At the end of the war, Daluege was arrested and extradited to Czechoslovakia, where he was tried and convicted for crimes against humanity. He was sentenced to death and executed by hanging in October 1946.

== Early life and career ==
Daluege, son of a Prussian state official, was born in the small Upper Silesian town of Kreuzburg (now Kluczbork) on 15 September 1897. He entered the Prussian Army in 1916 and served with the 7th Guards Infantry Regiment, attaining the rank of Vizefeldwebel. He served on the Eastern Front. In October 1917, he attended officers training in Doberitz. During his service on the Western Front, he was severely wounded in the head and shoulder in April 1918. He was hospitalised until October and declared 25% disabled. Daluege was awarded the Iron Cross, second class (1918) and the Wound Badge in Black (1918).

== 1920s ==
After World War I, Daluege became leader of Selbstschutz Oberschlesien (SSOS) – Upper Silesian Self Defense – an Upper Silesian veterans' organisation engaged in combat with the Poles in that region. In 1921, he also became active in the Freikorps Roßbach while studying engineering at Technische Hochschule in Berlin, where he eventually earned a civil engineering degree. Two years later he joined the Nazi Party (NSDAP) and was assigned Party number 31,981. He also joined the Greater German Workers' Party in the same year. From 1924, he helped to organise the Berlin Frontbann, largely a front organisation for the Nazi Sturmabteilung (SA), since it and the Nazi Party were banned in Prussia at that time. On 22 March 1926, he joined the SA, becoming the SA-Gauführer of Berlin, which he would continue to lead until 21 June 1928. On 1 November 1926, he became Joseph Goebbels' deputy Gauleiter in Gau Berlin-Brandenburg (later, Gau Groß-Berlin), a post he would retain until 1 November 1930.

== SS and police leader ==
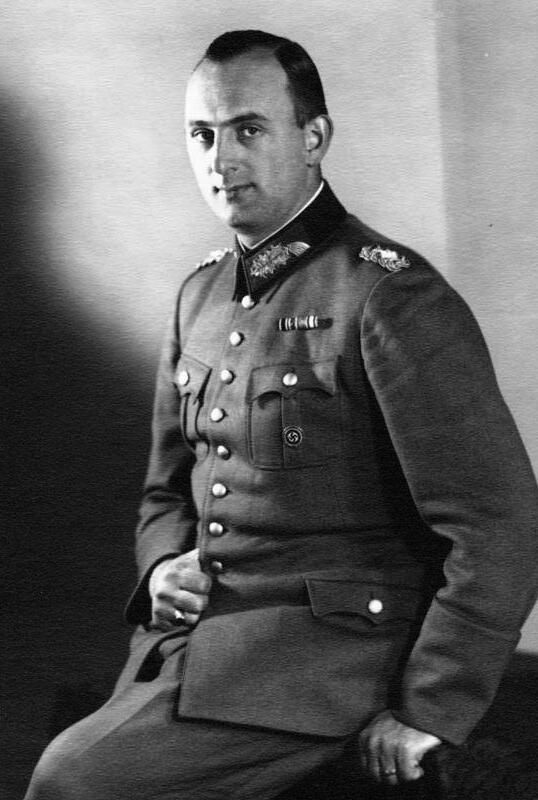
Daluege in 1933

In July 1930, in accordance with Adolf Hitler's wishes, Daluege resigned from the SA and joined the Schutzstaffel (SS) with the rank of SS-Oberführer and membership number 1,119. His main responsibility was to spy on the SA and political opponents of the Nazi Party. Berlin SS headquarters was strategically placed at the corner of Lützowstrasse and Potsdamerstrasse, opposite the SA headquarters.

In August 1930, when Berlin SA leader Walter Stennes had his men attack the Berlin Party headquarters, it was Daluege's SS men who defended it and put the attack down. Sometime afterwards in an open letter to Daluege, Hitler proclaimed "SS Mann, deine Ehre heißt Treue!" ("SS man, your honour is loyalty"). Then, the slogan "Meine Ehre heißt Treue" (My honour is loyalty) was duly adopted by the SS as its motto. Hitler promoted both Daluege and Heinrich Himmler to SS-Obergruppenführer, with Daluege the SS leader of northern Germany while Himmler controlled the southern SS units out of Munich in addition to serving as national leader for the entire SS.

In April 1932, Daluege was elected a Nazi Party deputy to the Landtag of Prussia where he served until its dissolution in October 1933. In June 1933, he was appointed the Deputy Plenipotentiary for Prussia to the Reichsrat where he served until its abolition on 14 February 1934. On 11 July 1933, Prussian Minister President Hermann Göring appointed Daluege to the recently reconstituted Prussian State Council. In September 1933, Göring moved Daluege to the Prussian Interior Ministry, where he took over the nonpolitical police with the rank of Generalmajor der Landespolizei. On 12 November 1933, he was elected to the Reichstag representing the Potsdam II (later, Berlin–East) electoral district, a seat he retained until 1945. Intrigues created by Göring, Himmler and Heydrich surrounding Ernst Röhm led to Daluege's playing an important role in the infamous Night of the Long Knives. In that operation, Röhm and other leading members of the SA were killed between 30 June and 2 July 1934, thus neutralising the SA and shifting the balance of power within the party to the SS.

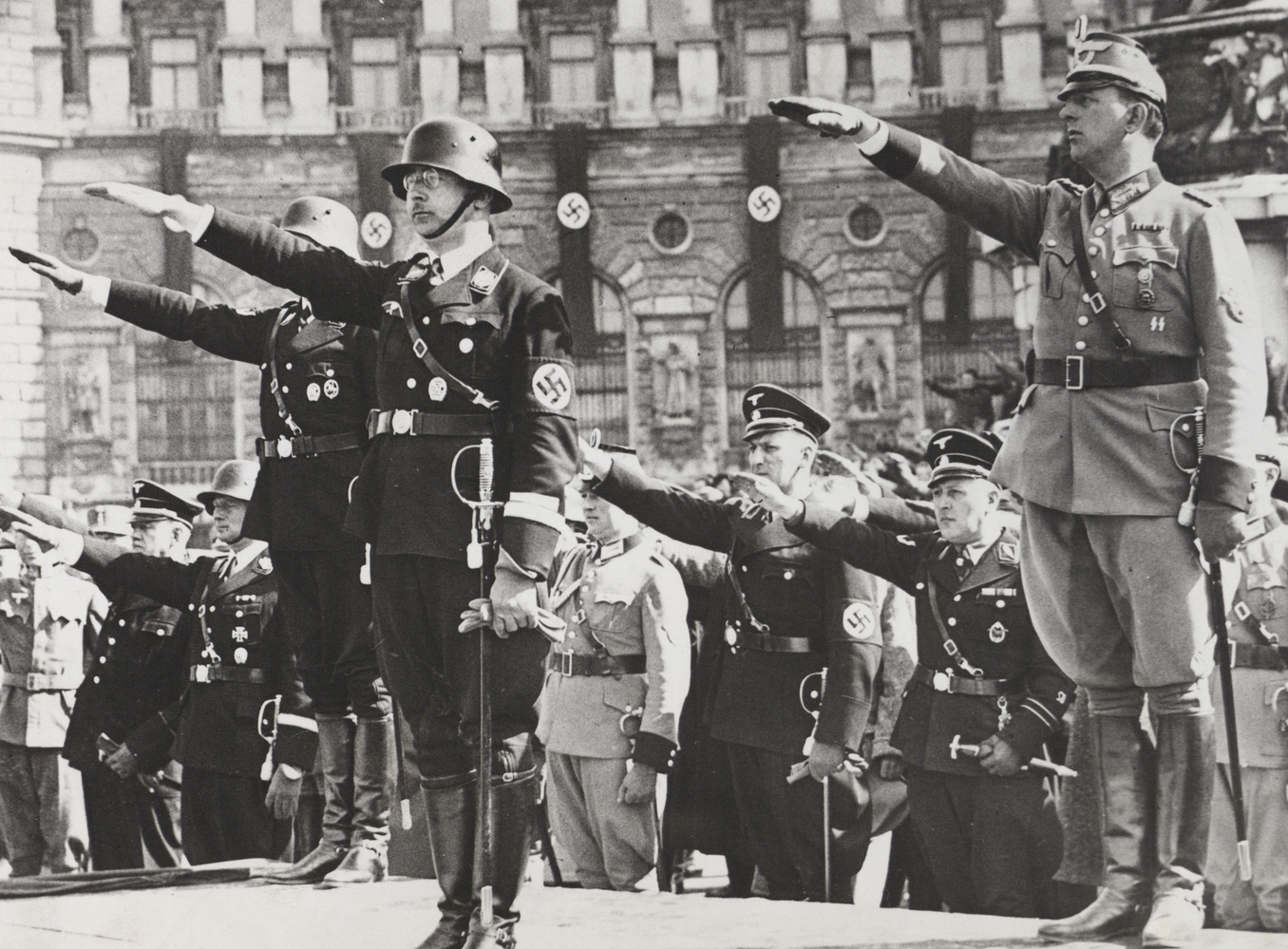
Himmler and Daluege (right), at the swearing in of Austrian police to Hitler in Heroes' Square during the Anschluss.

Evidence of Daluege's ruthlessness goes beyond his intrigue against his former SA comrades, and is discernible in his remarks about anyone he considered a threat to society. He once argued that "the consciously asocial enemies of the people (Volksfeinde)" must be eliminated by state intervention "if it hopes to prevent the outbreak of complete moral degeneration." Historian George Browder claims that Daluege "bragged that the Police Institute for detective training had especially been reorganised according to NS viewpoints", and that advancement within this organisation was contingent to a considerable degree on the internalisation of Nazi ideology.

By November 1934, Daluege's authority over the uniformed police was extended beyond Prussia to include all of Germany. That meant he commanded municipal police forces, the rural gendarmerie, traffic police, the coastguard, the railway police, the postal protection service, fire brigades, the air-raid services, the emergency technical service, the broadcasting police, the factory protection police, building regulations enforcement, and the commercial police.

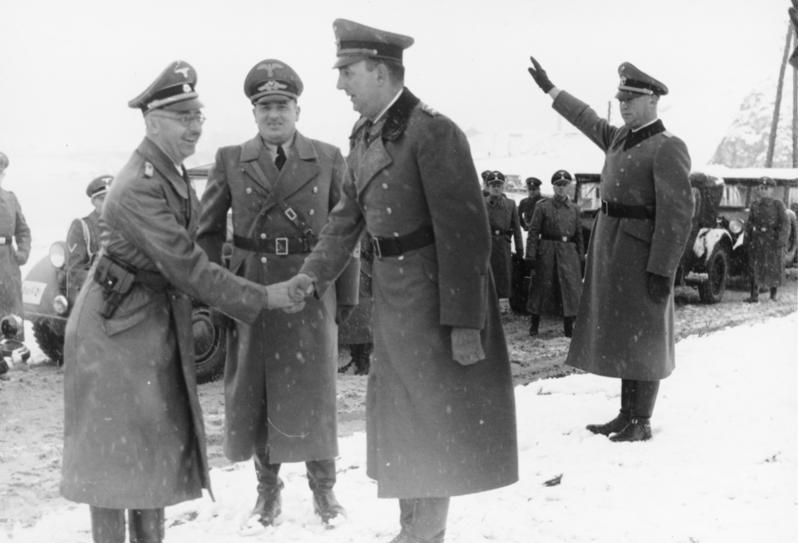
Daluege (right) in Kraków in 1939, shaking hands with Heinrich Himmler (left). Hans Frank (center) stands between them.

In 1936, the entire German police force was reorganised with the administrative functions previously exercised by the now largely defunct federal states reassigned to the nominal control of the Reich Interior Ministry, but under the actual control of Himmler's SS. Making the most of his police expertise and coinciding with his appointment, Daluege wrote and published a book entitled National-sozialistischer Kampf gegen das Verbrechertum (NS Struggle against Criminality). That same year, Himmler appointed Daluege as chief of the Ordnungspolizei (Order Police; Orpo), which gave him administrative, though not executive, authority over most of the uniformed police in Nazi Germany.

== Invasion of Poland and the Soviet Union ==
The Order Police was a key instrument of the security apparatus of Nazi Germany. In the prewar period, Daluege cooperated with SS chief Himmler in transforming the police force of the Weimar Republic into militarised formations ready to serve the regime's aims of conquest and racial annihilation. In 1938, before the breakout of World War II, the police units participated in the annexation of Austria and the occupation of Czechoslovakia. Daluege commanded the Order Police until 1943, rising to the rank of SS-Oberst-Gruppenführer und Generaloberst der Polizei. Reinhard Heydrich, who took control of the SiPo (Security Police) at the same time that Daluege took control of the Order Police, thought very little of Daluege, as he was a former rival in the early struggle for power, and was contemptuously referred to by Heydrich as 'Dummi-Dummi', or 'the idiot'.

By August 1939, the strength of the Order Police under Daluege's command and control had reached upwards of 120,000 active-duty personnel. Police troops were first formed into battalion-sized formations, Order Police battalions, for the invasion of Poland, where they were deployed for security and policing purposes, also taking part in executions and mass deportations.

Further indications of the brutality coming from Daluege's office are shown in a report dated 5 September 1939, outlining the methods to be employed during pacification operations in Poland. Regarding uniformed police battalions for planned reprisal actions around the Polish town of Czestochowa, the report gave the following instructions: "[t]he leader of this battalion is ordered to take the most drastic actions and measures such as those in the upper Silesian industrial area, the hanging of Polish franc-tireurs from light poles as a visible symbol for the entire population."

Twenty-three Order Police battalions were slated to take part in the 1941 invasion of the Soviet Union, Operation Barbarossa. Nine were attached to the Wehrmacht security divisions. Two battalions were assigned to support the Einsatzgruppen, the SS mobile death squads, and Organisation Todt, the military construction group. Twelve were formed into regiments, three battalions each, and designated as Police Regiments Centre, North, South, and Police Regiment Special Purpose. The goals of the police battalions were to secure the rear by eliminating the remnants of the enemy forces, guarding the prisoners of war, and protecting the lines of communications and captured industrial facilities. Their instructions also included, as Daluege stated, the "combat of criminal elements, above all political elements".

In the summer of 1941, Daluege attended a mass murder of 4,435 Jews by Police Battalion 307 near Brest-Litowsk and a mass murder of Jews in Minsk. Furthermore, in October 1941 Daluege signed deportation orders for Jews from Germany, Austria and the Protectorate of Bohemia and Moravia, to Riga and Minsk. On 7 July 1942, he attended a conference led by Himmler which discussed the "enlargement" of Operation Reinhard, the secretive Nazi plan to mass-murder Polish Jews in the General Government district of occupied Poland, and other matters involving SS and police policies in the east.

== Massacre of Lidice ==
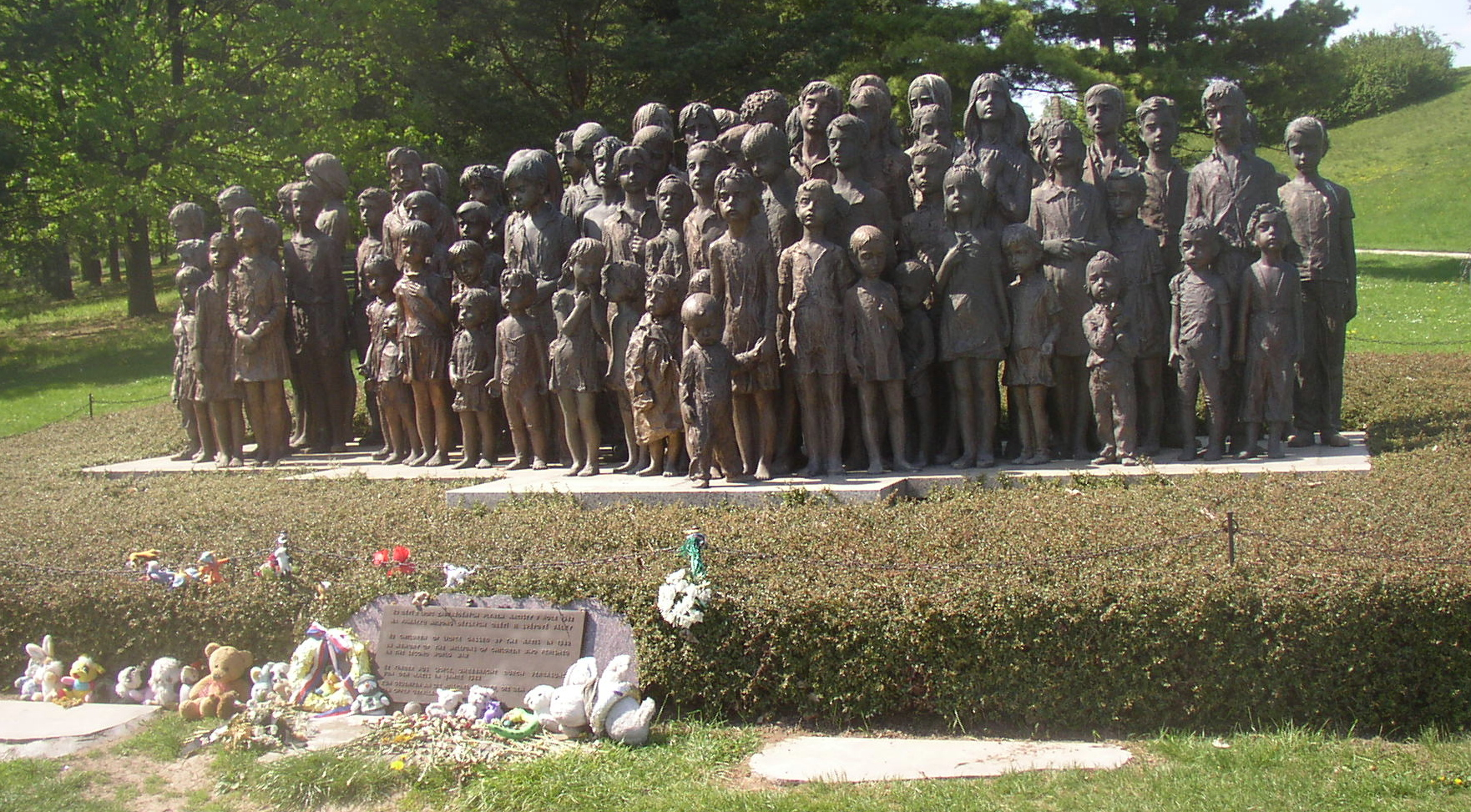
Memorial in the Czech Republic to children of Lidice murdered on Daluege's orders

In 1942 Daluege became the Deputy Protector of Bohemia and Moravia, following the assassination of the Deputy Protector Heydrich. There seemed to be almost no logic behind Hitler appointing Daluege beyond the fact that he was a senior SS officer and was already in Prague at the time, where he had arrived on the day of Heydrich's assassination for medical treatment. Hitler originally wanted to appoint Erich von dem Bach-Zelewski but Himmler persuaded Hitler not to do so, arguing that Bach-Zelewski could not be spared because of the military situation on the Eastern front. Although Konstantin von Neurath was nominally Protector he had been stripped of his authority in 1941, so Daluege was Acting Protector in all but name. In June 1942, along with Karl Hermann Frank and other SS operatives, he ordered the villages of Lidice and Ležáky razed in reprisal for Heydrich's death. All the men in both villages were murdered, while many of the women and children were deported to Nazi concentration camps.

== Personal life ==
On 16 October 1926, Daluege married Käthe Schwarz (born 23 November 1901) who later became a member of the Nazi Party (member no. 118,363). In 1937, Daluege and his wife adopted a son. Afterwards, Daluege's wife bore three biological children, two sons born in 1938 and 1940 and a daughter born in 1942.

In May 1943, Daluege became seriously ill after a massive heart attack. In August, he was relieved of all of his day-to-day responsibilities and spent the rest of the war living on a property in western Pomerania, given to him by Hitler.

== Trial and conviction ==
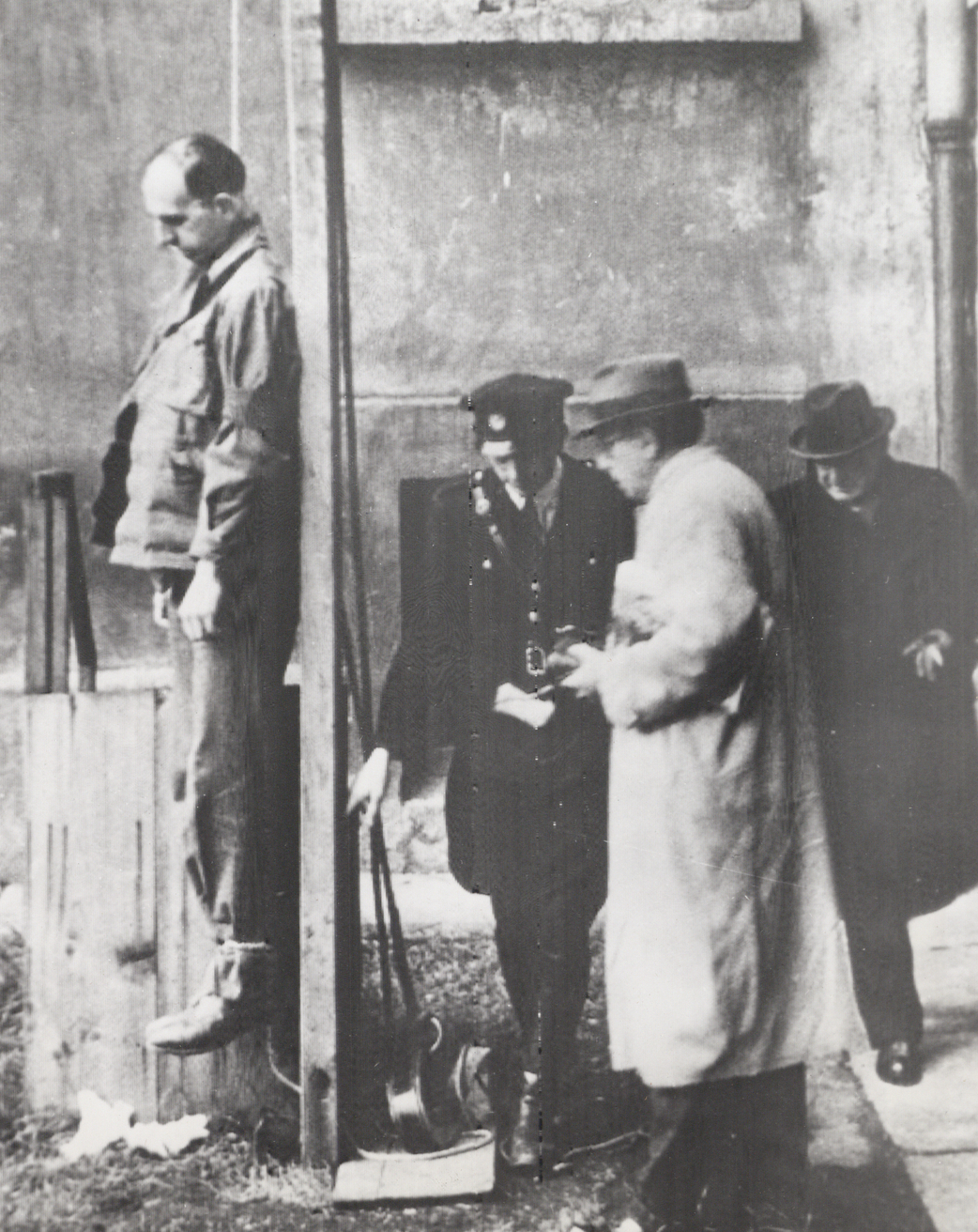
Hanging of Kurt Daluege, 24 October 1946

In May 1945, Daluege was arrested by British troops in Lübeck and interned in Luxembourg and then at Nuremberg, where he was charged as "a major war criminal". In September 1946 after being extradited to Czechoslovakia, he was tried for his many crimes against humanity committed in the Protectorate of Bohemia and Moravia. Throughout his trial, Daluege was unrepentant, claiming he was beloved by "three million policemen", only following Hitler's orders, and had a clear conscience. He was convicted on all charges and sentenced to death on 23 October 1946. Daluege was hanged in Pankrác Prison in Prague on 24 October 1946. He is buried in an unmarked grave at the Ďáblice Cemetery in Prague.

== Summary of SS career ==
Dates of promotion

- SS-Oberführer: 25 July 1930
- SS-Gruppenführer: 1 July 1932
- Generalmajor der Landespolizei: 14 September 1933
- SS-Obergruppenführer: 9 September 1934
- Generalleutnant der Landespolizei: 20 April 1935
- General der Polizei: 17 June 1936
- SS-Oberst-Gruppenführer und Generaloberst der Polizei: 20 April 1942

Decorations

- Iron Cross, second class (1918)
- Wound Badge in Black (1918)
- Golden Party Badge (1934)
- War Merit Cross with Swords, second class (1941) and first class (1941)
- German Cross in Silver (10 September 1942)
- Knights Cross of the War Merit Cross, with swords (7 September 1943)

== See also ==
- List of Nazi Party leaders and officials

Government offices
Preceded by Reinhard Heydrich (Acting Protector)	Deputy Protector of Bohemia and Moravia (Acting Protector); 5 June 1942 – 24 August 1943	Succeeded by Wilhelm Frick (Protector)
