= Police Regiment North =

- Polizei-Regiment Nord
- Active: 1941–1942
- Country: Nazi Germany
- Role: Nazi security warfare Participation in the Holocaust
- Size: Regiment
- Part of: Order Police units under SS command, reporting directly to Higher SS and Police Leader, North Russia

Commanders
- Notable commanders: Eberhard Herf

The Police Regiment North (Polizei-Regiment Nord) was a police formation under the command of the SS of Nazi Germany. During Operation Barbarossa, it was deployed in German-occupied areas of the Soviet Union, in the Army Group North Rear Area.

The Police Regiment North was formed in June 1941 by combining three Order Police battalions and associated units. The regiment was subordinated to Hans-Adolf Prützmann, the Higher SS and Police Leader (HSS-PF) for Army Group North.

Alongside the Einsatzgruppen detachments, it perpetrated mass murder in the Holocaust. The information on the scope of the unit's activities remains limited as, in contrast to the Police Regiment Centre and South, the 1941 reports of the unit were not intercepted by the British intelligence. Prützmann's command experienced communications difficulties during the summer of 1941. Then starting on September 12, the HSS-PF were instructed to not transmit their reports over the radio. Thus, none of its reports were decrypted as part of the operation Ultra, the British signals intelligence program.
