= University Press of Kansas =

American university press

- Parent company: Kansas Board of Regents
- Founded: 1946
- Country of origin: United States
- Headquarters location: Lawrence, Kansas
- Distribution: self-distributed (United States); Eurospan Group (EMEA); East-West Export Books (Asia, the Pacific); Scholarly Book Services (Canada)
- Publication types: Books
- Official website: kansaspress.ku.edu

The University Press of Kansas is a publisher located in Lawrence, Kansas. Operated by the University of Kansas, it represents the six state universities in the US state of Kansas: Emporia State University, Fort Hays State University, Kansas State University (K-State), Pittsburg State University, the University of Kansas (KU), and Wichita State University. (Note: Washburn University, a public university located in Topeka, is funded by county sales tax and has its own board of regents. It is thus not counted among the state universities.)

The press was established in 1946, with major reorganizations in 1967 and 1976. Today, it operates as a consortium with representation from each of the participating universities. It is currently located on the west portion of the KU campus. The University Press of Kansas is currently a member of the Association of University Presses and has been since 1946.

== History ==
The University Press of Kansas largely publishes works that explore American politics (including the presidency, American political thought, and public policy), military history, American history (especially political, cultural, intellectual, and western), environmental policy, American studies, film studies, law and legal history, Indigenous studies, Kansas, and the Midwest.

The press's specialty areas were cultivated in 1981, when then-director Fred Woodward noticed that, aside from a successful series on the US presidents, the press had published few works about political science. Woodward subsequently decided to focus on building a list of publications that explored the politics of the United States.

In 2021, leadership of the press was incorporated into the responsibilities of the dean of the University of Kansas Libraries, a position then held by Kevin Smith. In 2022, Mike Haddock, the associate dean for research, education and engagement at K-State Libraries, was appointed interim director of the press following Smith's departure from KU Libraries.

== Kansas Open Books initiative ==
The University Press of Kansas's "Kansas Open Books" initiative is project aimed at scanning out-of-print UPK books and offer them for free download. The project is funded by the Mellon Foundation and the National Endowment for the Humanities.

== Publications ==
Major book series published by the University Press of Kansas include:

- "American Political Thought"
- "American Presidential Elections"
- "American Presidency"
- "Civil Military Relations"
- "Congressional Leaders"
- "Constitutional Thinking"
- "CultureAmerica"
- "Environment and Society"
- "Kansas Nature Guides"
- "Landmark Law Cases and American Society"
- "Modern First Ladies"
- "Modern War Studies"
- "Rethinking Careers, Rethinking Academia"
- "Studies in Government and Public Policy"
- "US Army War College Guides to Civil War Battles"

== See also ==
- List of English-language book publishing companies
- List of university presses
