= Dennis Showalter =

American historian (1942–2019)

Dennis E. Showalter
- Born: February 12, 1942; Delano, Minnesota
- Died: December 30, 2019 (aged 77)
- Awards: Paul M. Birdsall Prize (1992); Samuel Eliot Morison Prize (2005); Pritzker Literature Award (2018)

Academic background
- Education: St. John's University (BA); University of Minnesota (MA, PhD)

Academic work
- Discipline: History
- Sub-discipline: German military history
- Institutions: Colorado College
- Notable works: Tannenberg (1991)

Dennis Edwin Showalter (February 12, 1942 – December 30, 2019) was a professor emeritus of history at Colorado College. Showalter specialized in German military history. He was president of the American Society for Military History from 1997 to 2001. In addition, Showalter was an advising fellow of the Barsanti Military History Center at the University of North Texas.

== Career ==
Showalter began teaching at Colorado College in 1969. Showalter also previously taught at the United States Air Force Academy, the United States Military Academy, the Marine Corps University, and for Norwich University's College of Graduate and Continuing Studies. He wrote extensively on the wars of Frederick the Great, the German Wars of Unification, World War I, and World War II.

== Awards and honors ==
- 1992 Paul Birdsall Prize for best new book given by the American Historical Association, for Tannenberg
- 2005 Samuel Eliot Morison Prize for lifetime achievement given by the Society for Military History
- 2011 Lloyd E. Worner Teacher of the Year Award, Colorado College
- 2018 Pritzker Literature Award

== Selected works ==
- "Manifestation of Reform: The Rearmament of the Prussian Infantry, 1806–13", The Journal of Modern History, Vol. 44, No. 3, September 1972
- Railroads and Rifles: Soldiers, Technology, and the Unification of Germany. Hamden, Connecticut: Archon/Shoe String, 1975. ISBN 0-208-01505-1
- Tannenberg: Clash of Empires, 1914. Hamden, Connecticut: Archon, 1991. ISBN 978-0-208-02252-3. Repr. Washington: Brassey's, 2004. ISBN 978-1-57488-781-5
- The Wars of Frederick the Great. London/New York: Longman, 1996. ISBN 978-0-582-06260-3
- The Wars of German Unification. London: Arnold, 2004. ISBN 978-0-340-73210-6
- Hindenburg: Icon of German Militarism. Military Profiles. Washington: Potomac, 2005. ISBN 978-1-57488-653-5 (with William J. Astore)
- Patton and Rommel: Men of War in the Twentieth Century. New York: Berkley Caliber, 2005. ISBN 978-0-425-19346-4
- Armor and Blood: The Battle of Kursk: The Turning Point of World War II. Random House, 2013. ISBN 978-1400066773
