= 11th SS Police Regiment =

- Country: Nazi Germany
- Branch: Schutzstaffel
- Type: Security
- Size: Regiment
- Garrison/HQ: Wehrkreis IV

The 11th SS Police Regiment (SS-Polizei-Regiment 11) was initially named the Police Regiment for Special Employment (Polizei-Regiment zbV) when it was formed around the beginning of 1942 from existing Order Police (Ordnungspolizei) units for security duties on the Eastern Front. The unit was renumbered as the 11th Police Regiment in July 1942 and then was redesignated as an SS unit in early 1943.

== Formation and organization ==
The regiment was formed around the beginning of 1942 under the command of Lieutenant Colonel of Police (Oberstleutenant der Schutzpolizei) Hans Griep (Note: Griep's first name is given as Walter elsewhere.) in the eastern Ukraine and subordinated to Gerret Korsemann, Higher SS and Police Leader For Special Employment. Police Battalion 304 (Polizei-Bataillon 304), Police Battalion 315 and Police Battalion 320 were assigned to the regiment. When the regiment was renumbered in July, the battalions were redesignated as the first through third battalions, respectively, of the regiment. All of the police regiments were redesignated as SS police units on 24 February 1943 and retained their existing organization and strength. In late June, the 10th Police Panzer Company equipped with two platoons of ex-French Panhard 178 armored cars was attached to the regiment in Russia. On 23 August, the 11th Police Panzer Company was formed with two platoons of Panhards and a platoon of ex-French Hotchkiss H35 tanks. Instead of joining the regiment in Russia, it was ordered to Croatia on 20 November where it remained for the rest of the war. The 10th Company's missing tank platoon was finally equipped with captured Soviet T-26 tanks and was ordered to join its parent unit on 17 March 1944. The 10th Company was detached from the regiment in September and withdrawn to Vienna for reequipment.
