= Narva offensive =

Narva offensive may refer to any of the following military operations of the Eastern Front of World War II:

- Narva offensive (15–28 February 1944)
- Narva offensive (1–4 March 1944)
- Narva offensive (18–24 March 1944)
- Narva offensive (July 1944)
