= March 1944 =

Month of 1944

<<	March 1944					>>
Su	Mo	Tu	We	Th	Fr	Sa
			1	2	3	4
5	6	7	8	9	10	11
12	13	14	15	16	17	18
19	20	21	22	23	24	25
26	27	28	29	30	31

The following events occurred in March 1944:

== March 1, 1944 (Wednesday) ==
- The Kingisepp–Gdov Offensive ended in Soviet victory.
- In Papua New Guinea, the Battle of Sio ended in Allied victory.
- As part of the Battle of Narva, the Soviets began the second Narva Offensive.
- The Vatican was bombed for the second time during the war.
- The Huon Peninsula campaign in Papua New Guinea ended in Allied victory.
- A massive strike began in the Italian Social Republic, for reasons that included resentment of producing for the Germans and the loyalty that many factory workers retained for Socialist and Communist ideologies. Estimates of the number of workers who participated in the strike range from 500,000 to 1.2 million.
- Three Japanese heavy cruisers began the Indian Ocean raid.
- At the Wolf's Lair, Adolf Hitler received leaders of the Independent State of Croatia to discuss current political issues.
- German submarines U-358, U-603 and U-709 were all sunk in the Atlantic Ocean by Allied warships.
- Born: John Breaux, politician, in Crowley, Louisiana; Roger Daltrey, singer and front-man of The Who, in Hammersmith, London, England

== March 2, 1944 (Thursday) ==
- A second landing in the Admiralty Islands saw 1,000 men of the U.S. 5th Cavalry Regiment arrive at Los Negros while the previous landing group took Momote Airfield.
- The 16th Academy Awards were held at Grauman's Chinese Theater, marking the first time the ceremony was held in a large public venue. Casablanca won Best Picture.
- The Balvano train disaster occurred over the night of March 2/3 when some 426 people illegally riding a freight train in southern Italy died of carbon monoxide poisoning.
- Born: Uschi Glas, actress, in Landau an der Isar, Germany; Leif Segerstam, conductor, composer, violinist and musician, in Vaasa, Finland (d. 2024)
- Died: Egon Mayer, 26, German fighter ace (shot down near Montmédy, France)

== March 3, 1944 (Friday) ==
- Joseph Stalin rejected British proposals to negotiate over the Polish-Soviet border.
- A night attack by the Japanese garrison on Los Negros was repulsed by the Americans.
- The Order of Nakhimov and Order of Ushakov military decorations were established in the Soviet Union.
- On the Anzio’s beachhead, the 3rd Infantry Division repelled a German counter-attack in the locality of Ponte Rotto.
- In Rome, a protest of women, demanding the release of their husbands detained in a German station, ended tragically. Teresa Gullace, seven months pregnant, was killed by a German soldier while she tried to pass a sandwich to her husband. The story was later reenacted in a famous episode of Rome open city.

== March 4, 1944 (Saturday) ==
- The second Narva Offensive ended in another German defensive victory.
- Former Vichy French Interior Minister Pierre Pucheu went on trial on Algiers.
- China and Afghanistan signed a treaty of friendship.
- German submarine U-472 was sunk in the Barents Sea by Fairey Swordfish of 816 Naval Air Squadron.
- The Philadelphia Phillies baseball team announced a uniform change for the coming season: the addition of a new sleeve patch depicting a blue jay perching atop the familiar "Phillies" lettering. The logo was the winning entry in a contest that received over 5,000 entries with a $100 war bond offered as a prize. Fans were confused because the Phillies did not actually officially change their name to Blue Jays, but this alternate nickname would never really catch on anyway and the blue jay sleeve patch was dropped in 1946.
- "Bésame Mucho" by Jimmy Dorsey and His Orchestra hit #1 on the Billboard singles charts.
- Born: Harvey Postlethwaite, aerodynamicist and engineer, in Barnet, England (d. 1999); Bobby Womack, singer and songwriter, in Cleveland, Ohio (d. 2014)
- Died: Louis Buchalter, 47, Jewish-American mobster (executed by electric chair)

== March 5, 1944 (Sunday) ==
- The Red Army began the Uman–Botoșani Offensive.
- Soviet forces took the Ukrainian cities of Iziaslav and Yampil.
- Operation Thursday: The 77th Indian Infantry Brigade, otherwise known as the Chindits, flew by Hadrian glider from India into the heart of Burma.
- German submarine U-366 was depth charged and sunk in the Arctic Ocean by Fairey Swordfish of 816 Naval Air Squadron.
- Born: Peter Brandes, painter, sculptor, ceramic artist and photographer, in Assens, Denmark (d. 2025)
- Died: Max Jacob, 67, French artist and writer (died of bronchial pneumonia in Drancy internment camp)

== March 6, 1944 (Monday) ==
- American heavy bombers mounted the first-ever, full-scale daylight raid on Berlin.
- Soviet forces took Volochysk.
- Finland rejected a Soviet peace offer, objecting to the Soviet condition that all German troops in the country be interned and the 1940 borders be restored.
- German submarine U-744 was depth charged and sunk in the Atlantic Ocean by Allied warships.
- German submarine U-973 was depth charged and sunk in the Arctic Ocean by Fairey Swordfish of 816 Naval Air Squadron.
- Born: Kiri Te Kanawa, soprano, in Gisborne, New Zealand; Mary Wilson, singer and founding member of the Supremes, in Greenville, Mississippi (d. 2021)

== March 7, 1944 (Tuesday) ==
- The Japanese began the offensive code-named Operation U-Go on the Indian-Burman border.
- Born: Townes Van Zandt, singer and songwriter, in Fort Worth, Texas (d. 1997)
- Died: Emanuel Ringelblum, 43, Polish-Jewish historian and social worker (executed by the Gestapo)

== March 8, 1944 (Wednesday) ==
- The Battle of Imphal began in northeast India.
- The Second Battle of Torokina began on Bougainville Island, a Japanese counteroffensive against the American foothold there.
- The British government announced plans to build 300,000 houses after the war.
- The general strike in the Italian Social Republic ended after eight days. The Germans had arrested and deported about 1,200 workers.
- The war film The Purple Heart starring Dana Andrews and Richard Conte was released, dramatizing the "show trial" of a number of American airmen by the Japanese during World War II.
- Born: Buzz Hargrove, labour leader, in Bath, New Brunswick, Canada (d. 2025); Carole Bayer Sager, singer, songwriter and painter, in New York City

== March 9, 1944 (Thursday) ==
- The U.S. 5th Marine Regiment took Talasea in New Britain unopposed.
- American destroyer escort Leopold was torpedoed and heavily damaged in the North Atlantic by German submarine U-255. The 28 survivors of the 191 crew were rescued and Leopold was abandoned to sink the next day.

== March 10, 1944 (Friday) ==
- Ireland rejected a U.S. request to expel Axis diplomats from the country.
- The Kriegsmarine lost four U-boats (U-343, U-450, U-625 and U-845) to enemy action in a single day.
- The leftist Political Committee of National Liberation, commonly known as the "Mountain Government", was established in Greece.
- The war film The Fighting Seabees starring John Wayne and Susan Hayward was released.

== March 11, 1944 (Saturday) ==
- British forces took Buthidaung in Burma.
- German military officer Eberhard von Breitenbuch took a concealed pistol to a military briefing with Hitler at the Berghof with the intention of assassinating him. However, SS guards barred Breitenbuch from the room where Hitler met with higher-ranking officers and so the assassination attempt never went forward.
- Pierre Pucheu was sentenced to death.
- In Paris, police discovered casually, in the house of Dr. Marcel Petiot, the remains of at least ten bodies and a large amount of clothing. The doctor, who had killed and robbed dozens of people under the cover of his Resistance activity, managed to escape.
- In Padua, the Church of the Eremitani was half-destroyed by an American bombing. The Ovetari chapel was razed to the ground and its frescoes, work by Andrea Mantegna, were forever lost.
- German submarines U-380 and U-410 were bombed and sunk at Toulon in an American air raid.
- Born: Graham Lyle, musician and producer, in Bellshill, Scotland; Don Maclean, actor and comedian, in Birmingham, England
- Died: Irvin S. Cobb, 67, American author and humorist

== March 12, 1944 (Sunday) ==
- U.S. Marines occupied Wotje Atoll without opposition.
- Soviet forces of the 2nd Ukrainian Front reached the Bug River at Gayvoron.
- Pope Pius XII asked the belligerent powers to spare the city of Rome from fighting and destruction.
- Hitler ordered Operation Margarethe, the German occupation of Hungary.
- Died: Romolo Murri, 73, Italian priest and later politician, exponent of Catholic modernism

== March 13, 1944 (Monday) ==
- The Soviet 28th Army captured Kherson.
- On Bougainville Island, Japanese troops ended their assault on American forces at Hill 700.
- Italy and the Soviet Union restored diplomatic relations with one another.
- German submarine U-575 was depth charged and sunk in the Atlantic Ocean by Allied ships and aircraft.
- Japanese cruiser Tatsuta was torpedoed and sunk off Hachijō-jima by the American submarine Sand Lance.
- Died: Lev Shestakov, 38, Russian fighter ace (missing in action on the Eastern Front)

== March 14, 1944 (Tuesday) ==
- Winston Churchill told the House of Commons that the Allies intended to completely isolate Ireland to prevent military secrets leaking to the Axis, hinting that the border with Northern Ireland would soon be closed.
- 30 RAF planes were sent to attack Düsseldorf overnight.
- The Republican Party presidential primaries began in the United States.

== March 15, 1944 (Wednesday) ==
- During the Battle of Monte Cassino the Allies dropped 992 tons of bombs on Monte Cassino Monastery and fired 195,000 rounds of artillery. British, Indian and New Zealand forces tried to storm the building but were unable to dislodge the Germans.
- German submarine U-653 was depth charged and sunk in the North Atlantic by British sloops Starling and Wild Goose.
- British submarine Stonehenge was lost in the Indian Ocean on or around this date, presumably to a naval mine.
- State Anthem of the Soviet Union replaced The Internationale as the new anthem of the Soviet Union.
- Born: A. K. Faezul Huq, politician, lawyer and columnist, in Calcutta, British India (d. 2007)

== March 16, 1944 (Thursday) ==
- The Japanese Indian Ocean raid ended inconclusively.
- The American submarine Tautog torpedoed and sank the Japanese destroyer Shirakumo east of Muroran, Hokkaido.
- American aircraft and British warships sank the German submarine U-392 in the Strait of Gibraltar.
- At a National Advisory Committee for Aeronautics (NACA) seminar, in Washington, D.C., with Army Air Forces and Navy personnel attending, NACA personnel proposed a jet-propelled transonic research airplane be developed. This proposal ultimately led to the "X" series research airplane projects.

== March 17, 1944 (Friday) ==
- Soviet forces took Dubno.
- Mount Vesuvius erupted, killing 26 civilians, destroying 88 American aircraft, and displacing 12,000 Italians.
- German submarine U-801 was sunk in the Atlantic Ocean by American warships and aircraft.
- The novel Strange Fruit by Lillian Smith was banned in Boston as obscene.
- Born: Pattie Boyd, model, photographer and author, in Taunton, England; John Sebastian, musician and founding member of The Lovin' Spoonful, in Greenwich Village, New York

== March 18, 1944 (Saturday) ==
- As part of the Battle of Narva, the Soviets began the third Narva Offensive.
- The Soviets took Zhmerynka.
- German soldiers began a two-day massacre of almost 400 prisoners, Soviet citizens and anti-fascists in the Romanian city of Rîbnița.
- Hungarian head of state Miklós Horthy came to the Schloss Klessheim south of Salzburg at Hitler's invitation. Horthy was forced to accept a new government and allow German troops onto Hungarian soil.
- In Italy, the stratovolcano Mount Vesuvius began erupting for the first time since 1929.
- On the Modena Apennines, the 1st Fallschirm-Panzer Division Hermann Göring bombed the villages of Monchio, Susano and Costrignano, around Montefiorino, and slaughtered their whole population. The victims were 129, all civilians, and included women, old men and children. The carnage was aimed to repress the partisan activity in the zone.
- Aimo Koivunen and his men were attacked by the Russian Soviets during a rest; after this Aimo went on an insane methamphetamine adventure alone in the snowy lands of Murmansk Oblast, Russia.
- The German Ariete-class torpedo boat TA36 (formerly Stella Polare), with the crew of 150, after arriving from Trieste to the Kvarner Gulf as part of the escort of the minelayer Kiebitz, struck a mine east of Cape Mašnjak south of Brestova in the Vela vrata strait at 17:15 local time, because of a navigational error, and sank; 46 people were killed.
- Died: Noël Édouard, vicomte de Curières de Castelnau, 92, French World War I general

== March 19, 1944 (Sunday) ==
- Eight German divisions carried out Operation Margarethe and occupied Hungary to forestall their Axis partner from making a separate peace with the Soviet Union.
- German submarine U-1059 was sunk southwest of Cape Verde by American aircraft.
- The surrealistic farcical play Desire Caught by the Tail by Pablo Picasso was first performed in Paris, as a reading in the apartment of Michel Leiris. Jean-Paul Sartre and Simone de Beauvoir were among the performers, while Albert Camus was the presenter, thumping the floor with a stick to indicate changes in scenery which he described.
- The secular oratorio A Child of Our Time by Michael Tippett premiered at the Adelphi Theatre in London.
- The Indian National Army (INA) hoisted the Tricolour flag on liberated Indian soil.
- Born: Said Musa, 5th Prime Minister of Belize, in San Ignacio, Belize; Sirhan Sirhan, Palestinian-Jordanian convicted assassin of Robert F. Kennedy, in Jerusalem, Mandatory Palestine
- Died: Giuseppe De Liguoro, 75, pioneer of Italian cinema

== March 20, 1944 (Monday) ==
- The Battle of Sangshak began in Manipur.
- U.S. Marines began the unopposed Landing on Emirau.
- Soviet forces captured the Ukrainian cities of Vinnytsia and Mohyliv-Podilskyi.
- Died: Pierre Pucheu, 44, French industrialist, fascist and member of the Vichy government (executed)

== March 21, 1944 (Tuesday) ==
- U.S. and Australian troops linked up on New Guinea's Huon Peninsula.
- Finnish parliament held a secret session in which it rejected the peace terms offered by the Soviet Union.
- Born: Hilary Minster, actor, in Surrey, England (d. 1999); Manny Sanguillén, baseball player, in Colón, Panama

== March 22, 1944 (Wednesday) ==
- The Red Army took Pervomaisk.
- Döme Sztójay replaced Miklós Kállay as Prime Minister of Hungary.
- Authorities in German-controlled Hungary promulgated anti-Jewish legislation and ordered all Jewish businesses to close. Hundreds were sent to the Kistarcsa internment camp for political prisoners northeast of Budapest.
- The U.S. Office of Strategic Services began Operation Ginny II, once again intending to blow up railway tunnels in Italy to cut German lines of communication. The mission failed when the OSS team once again landed in the wrong place and were captured by the Germans two days later.
- Volcanic stones of all sizes from Mount Vesuvius began raining down from the sky, forcing the evacuation of airmen of 340th Bombardment Group stationed at an airfield a few miles from the volcano. Once Vesuvius subsided they returned to base and found that about 80 of their B-25 bombers had been destroyed by hot ash.
- Institution of the CIL (Corpo Italiano di Liberazione, Italian Liberation Corps), that gathers the units of the Italian Army fighting beside the Allies.
- Massacre of Montaldo (near Tolentino): 33 partisans, almost all in their twenties, were shot by the Germans; only one of the victims miraculously survived the execution. The next day, the commander of the young ones, Achille Barilatti, followed their fate.
- Died: Pierre Brossolette, 40, French journalist, politician and Resistance fighter (committed suicide while in Gestapo custody)

== March 23, 1944 (Thursday) ==
- Allied forces withdrew from Monte Cassino and the offensive was called off.
- Beginning of the Operation Strangle, a series of air interdiction operations aimed to cut the German supply of the Italian front.
- A bomb planted by Italian partisans killed 33 members of the SS in Rome.
- The romantic comedy film The Heavenly Body starring William Powell and Hedy Lamarr premiered in New York.
- Died: Myron Selznick, 45, American film producer and talent agent

== March 24, 1944 (Friday) ==
- The third Narva Offensive ended in another German defensive victory.
- German occupation troops in Italy carried out the Ardeatine massacre, killing 335 people outside of Rome in retaliation for the bomb attack of the previous day.
- In Rome, Ivanoe Bonomi resigned as president of the CCLN (Comitato Centrale di Liberazione Nazionale, Central National Liberation Committee). The organization was paralyzed by the contrasts between adversaries (PCI; PSI. Pd’A) and supporters (DC, PLI and DL) of the collaboration with the monarchist Badoglio cabinet.
- The "Great Escape": 76 Royal Air Force prisoners of war escape by tunnel "Harry" from Stalag Luft III in Lower Silesia over the night of 24th/5th. Only 3 men (2 Norwegians and a Dutchman) return to the UK; of those recaptured, 50 are summarily executed soon afterwards, in the Stalag Luft III murders.
- RAF Flight Sergeant Nicholas Alkemade survived a fall of 18,000 feet without a parachute when his Lancaster bomber was shot down east of Schmallenberg. Pine trees and soft snow broke his fall.
- Born: R. Lee Ermey, actor and former USMC drill instructor, in Emporia, Kansas (d. 2018)
- Died:
  - Orde Wingate, 41, British Army officer (plane crash).
  - Giuseppe Cordero Lanza di Montezemolo, 42, commander of Fronte Militare Clandestino (Clandestine Military Front), organization of the Italian resistance; Aldo Finzi, 52, Jewish, former Undersecretary for the Interiors in the Mussolini cabinet; and Pietro Pappagallo, 55, priest and partisan; all shot at the Ardeatine massacre.

== March 25, 1944 (Saturday) ==
- The Battle of the Kamenets-Podolsky pocket began when the Soviets attempted to surround and destroy the German 1st Panzer Army of Army Group South at Tarnopol.
- Stalag Luft III murders: Hitler ordered the execution of prisoners of war who were recaptured after escaping Stalag Luft III.

== March 26, 1944 (Sunday) ==
- The Battle of Sangshak ended in tactical Japanese victory but strategic British victory, since the British were able to hold off the Japanese long enough to send reinforcements to Kohima.
- American submarine Tullibee sank north of Palau due to a torpedo malfunction. Only 1 of the 60 crew survived.
- The fifteen members of the captured OSS team in Operation Ginny II were summarily executed by German forces under Hitler's Commando Order at the command of General Anton Dostler. After the war Dostler would be executed as a war criminal.
- Born:
  - Diana Ross, singer, songwriter, actress and music producer, in Detroit, Michigan
  - Igor Mitoraj, Polish sculptor (d. 2014)

== March 27, 1944 (Monday) ==
- U.S. Marines completed the Landing on Emirau.
- A Finnish delegation met with Vyacheslav Molotov to discuss a peace settlement.
- The British merchant ship Tulagi was sunk in the Indian Ocean by German submarine U-532.
- Palmiro Togliatti, secretary of the Italian Communist Party, returned to Italy from the Soviet Union, after eighteen years of exile.
- Born:
  - Khosrow Shakibai, actor, in Tehran, Iran (d. 2008)
  - Franco Scaglia, Italian writer, in Camogli (d. 2015)

== March 28, 1944 (Tuesday) ==
- The Red Army captured Nikolaev.
- The British submarine Syrtis was lost in the Norwegian Sea, probably sunk by a naval mine.
- British MPs voted to give women teachers the same pay as men.
- Salerno turning: Palmiro Togliatti, in a telegram sent from Salerno to the members of the PCI direction, announced the new line of the party. He sustained the collaboration with the bourgeois parties and the constitution of a government of national unity, and postponed the choosing between monarchy and republic to the after-war.
- University of Utah defeated Dartmouth College 42–40 in the championship final of the NCAA Division I men's basketball tournament at Madison Square Garden in New York City.
- Born: Rick Barry, basketball player, in Elizabeth, New Jersey; Ken Howard, actor, in El Centro, California (d. 2016)

== March 29, 1944 (Wednesday) ==
- The Soviets took Kolomyia.
- German submarine U-961 was depth charged and sunk north of the Faroe Islands by the Royal Navy sloop HMS Starling.
- The Japanese 31st Division cut the Imphal-Kohima road at Maram. The Imphal garrison could now only be supplied by air.
- Born: Denny McLain, baseball player, in Markham, Illinois
- Died: Romualdas Marcinkus, 36, Lithuanian pilot (executed by the Gestapo)

== March 30, 1944 (Thursday) ==
- The United States Navy began Operation Desecrate One, in which aircraft carriers launched attacks against Japanese bases on and around Palau. 36 Japanese ships were sunk or damaged in the attacks.
- The RAF suffered its worst loss of the war in a raid on Nuremberg. 96 of 795 aircraft were shot down, and cloud over the city meant that only a small proportion of the force hit their target.
- Hitler sacked Erich von Manstein and Paul Ludwig Ewald von Kleist from their command posts on the Eastern Front and replaced them with Walter Model and Ferdinand Schörner.
- The British destroyer Laforey was torpedoed and sunk north of Palermo, Sicily by German submarine U-223, which was then depth charged and sunk by four British destroyers.
- Born: Maurizio Vandelli, Italian singer, leader of the group Equipe 84, in Modena.

== March 31, 1944 (Friday) ==
- The Soviet 3rd Ukrainian Front took Ochakov.
- Georg Lindemann replaced Walter Model as commander of Army Group North.
- Died: Mineichi Koga, 58, Japanese admiral (plane crash)
