= Narva offensive (1–4 March 1944) =

1944 battle in Estonia during WW II

Coordinates: 59.3833°N 28.2000°E

- Part of Eastern Front (World War II)
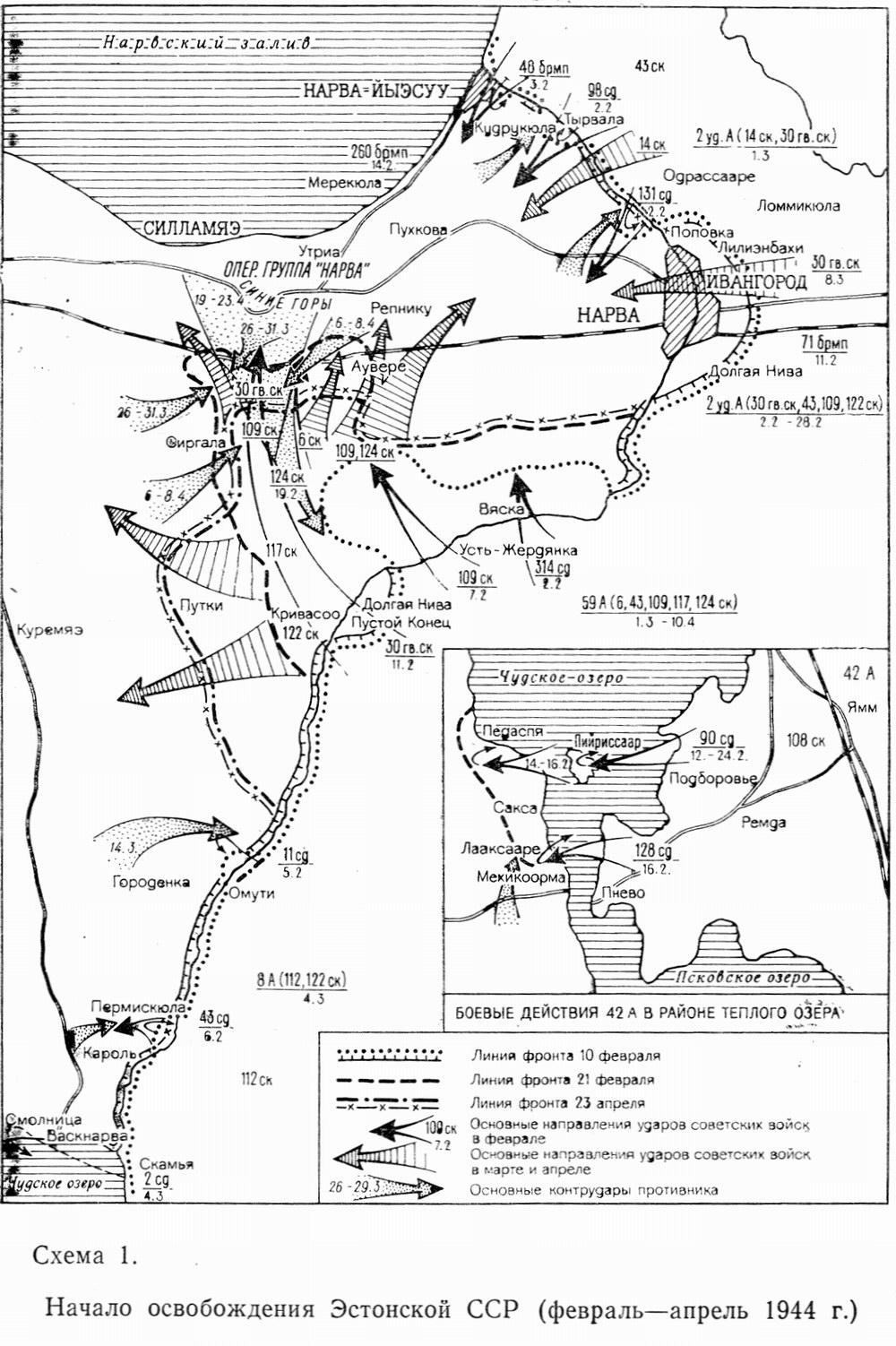
- Soviet map of the beginning of Estonian Operation (February – April 1944)
Date	1–4 March 1944
Location	Narva, Estonia
Result	German defensive victory

Belligerents
Germany	Soviet Union

Commanders and leaders
(Nazi Germany) Johannes Frießner	(Soviet Union) Leonid A. Govorov

Strength
123,541	200,000; 100 armoured vehicles 2,500 artillery pieces 800 aircraft

Casualties and losses
Thousands	Many more than the Germans

The Narva offensive (1–4 March 1944) (Estonian: Putki lahing) was an operation conducted by the Soviet Leningrad Front. It was aimed at the conquest of the Narva Isthmus from the German army detachment "Narwa". At the time of the operation, Joseph Stalin, the supreme commander of the Soviet Armed Forces, was personally interested in taking Estonia, viewing it as a precondition to forcing Finland out of the war.

The Soviet 59th Army attacked westwards from the Krivasoo bridgehead south of the city of Narva and encircled the strong-points of the 214th Infantry Division and the Estonian 658th and 659th East Battalions. The resistance of the encircled units gave time for the command of the "Narwa" to move in all available forces and stop the Soviet advance. To the north of Narva, the fresh SS 45th and 46th (1st and 2nd Estonian) Volunteer Grenadier Regiments accompanied by units of the 11th SS Volunteer Panzergrenadier Division "Nordland" counter-attacked and reduced the Soviet bridgehead.

== Prelude ==
=== Preceding combat ===
Units of the 20th Estonian SS Volunteer Division were tasked with destroying the Siivertsi bridgehead, which was defended by the 1,100-strong 378th Rifle Division equipped with 20 assault guns. The attack was commanded by Standartenführer Paul Vent. The SS 45th (1st Estonian) Waffen Grenadier Regiment made a direct assault on the bridgehead on 29 February. Simultaneously, the SS 46th (2nd Estonian) Waffen Grenadier Regiment, in their attempt to attack from the left flank, ran into the Soviet fortifications and a minefield, which they crossed.

=== Preparations and goals ===
The operational goals of the Soviet offensive was to break through to the Vasknarva-Jõhvi Road and the Narva-Tallinn road and to capture the village of Jõhvi and the town of Rakvere.

The setbacks in the Narva offensive (15–28 February 1944) came as an unpleasant surprise to the leadership of the Leningrad Front, blaming it on the arrival of the Estonian Division. Since the beginning of January, the Leningrad Front had lost 227,440 troops killed, wounded or missing in action, which constituted more than half of the troops who participated in the Leningrad–Novgorod strategic offensive. Both sides rushed reinforcements into the area. The 59th Army was brought to Narva and the 8th Estonian Rifle Corps placed under the command of the Leningrad Front.

== Deployments ==
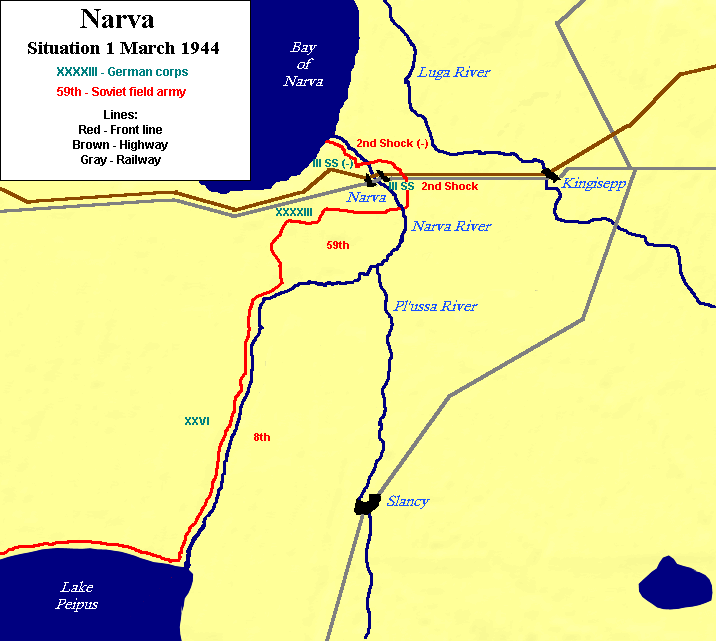
Situation around Narva, March 1944.

=== German ===
Army Group North ordered the deployment of the army detachment "Narwa" on 22 February in the following positions: III SS Panzer Corps deployed to the north of Narva and the bridgehead on the east bank of the river, the XXXXIII Army Corps against the Krivasoo bridgehead and the XXVI Army Corps to the sector between the bridgehead and Lake Peipus. As of 1 March 1944, there were a total of 123,541 personnel subordinated to the army group in the following order of battle:

- XXVI Army Corps – General der Infanterie Anton Grasser
- XXXXIII Army Corps – General der Infanterie Karl von Oven
- III SS (Germanic) Panzer Corps – SS-Obergruppenführer Felix Martin Julius Steiner

Separate units:

- Eastern Sector, Coastal Defence (Staff of 2nd Anti-Aircraft Division as HQ) – Lieutenant General Alfons Luczny
  - Estonian Regiment "Reval"
  - 3 Estonian Police battalions
  - 658th and 659th Estonian Eastern Battalions

Other military units:

- Artillery Command No. 113
- High Pioneer Command No. 32
- 502nd Heavy Tank Battalion
- 752nd Anti-Tank Battalion
- 540th Special Infantry (Training) Battalion

=== Soviet ===
Three Soviet armies were deployed during the course of the operation. The 2nd Shock Army was placed in the sector against the German bridgehead and north to the Gulf of Finland; the 59th Army south of the city of Narva and the 8th Army south of the 59th Army along the 50 km long Narva river stretching down to Lake Peipus. Detailed information on the size of the Soviet forces at the Narva front during the Winter-Spring campaign has not been published by any sources. It is impossible to give an overview on the Soviet strength until the Red Army archival information is made available to non-Russian investigators or published. Estonian historian Hannes Walter has estimated the number of Soviet troops at 205,000 which is in accordance with the number of divisions multiplied by the assumed sizes of the divisions presented by the Estonian historian Mart Laar, accounting for roughly 200,000 troops. The order of battle of the Leningrad Front as of 1 March 1944, is:

- 2nd Shock Army – Lieutenant General Ivan Fedyuninski
  - 43rd Rifle Corps – Major General Anatoli Andreyev
  - 109th Rifle Corps – Major General Ivan Alferov
  - 124th Rifle Corps – Major General Voldemar Damberg
- 8th Army – Lieutenant General Filipp Starikov
  - 6th Rifle Corps – Major General Semyon Mikulski
  - 112th Rifle Corps – Major General Filipp Solovev
  - 115th Rifle Corps – (HQ with no troops assigned by 1 Apr 1944)
- 59th Army – Lieutenant General Ivan Korvnikov
  - 117th Rifle Corps – Major General Vasili Trubachev
  - 122nd Rifle Corps – Major General Panteleimon Zaitsev

Separate detachments:

- 8th Estonian Rifle Corps – Lieutenant General Lembit Pärn
- 14th Rifle Corps – Major General Pavel Artyushenko
- 124th Rifle Division – Colonel Papchenko Danilovich
- 30th Guards Rifle Corps – Lieutenant General Nikolai Simonyak
- 46th, 260th and 261st Separate Guards Heavy Tank and 1902nd Separate Self-propelled Artillery regiments
- 3rd Breakthrough Artillery Corps – Major General N. N. Zhdanov
- 3rd Guards Tank Corps – Major General I. A. Vovchenko

== Combat activity ==
=== Southern wing ===
On 1 March, units of the newly arrived Soviet 59th Army, supported by the fire of 2,500 assault guns and more than 100 tanks, attacked the German 214th Infantry Division from the Krivasoo bridgehead. The objective of the attack was the nearest connecting road in the village of Kuremäe. After three days of heavy fighting, the Soviet army broke through the defence and advanced towards the Vasknarva–Jõhvi Highway. The Soviets encircled the strong points of the 214th Infantry Division and the Estonian 658th and 659th Eastern Battalions, which continued resisting. Lieutenant General Ivan Korvnikov, in charge of the Soviet 59th Army, delayed the advance, citing a lack of artillery support and scarcity of manpower. This gave time for Frießner to move in all available forces and stop the Soviet advance. Units of the 59th Army attacked towards the northwest from the Krivasoo bridgehead on 4 March.

A Soviet regiment of the 2nd Rifle Division attempted a surprise assault over the northeastern tip of Lake Peipus in order to seize the road along the north shore of the lake on 2 March. Up to 500 of them were killed by the 225th Infantry Division, a large number of weapons were captured, including seven assault guns.

=== Northern wing ===
The SS Panzergrenadier Regiment 24 "Danmark" counter-attacked and took Siivertsi cemetery. They attacked from the northern suburbs of Narva, but could not destroy a Soviet strong-point inside a massive granite monument erected in honour of the soldiers of the Northwestern White Army in the battle of Narva, 1919. The Soviets were eventually killed by a flamethrower. An even larger strong-point was in the wreck of a Tiger tank. It was destroyed by Ago Loorpärg, the commander of an Estonian anti-tank company, firing at it with a captured Soviet 45 mm gun incidentally found in a loaded state. The 1st and 2nd Estonian Regiments squeezed the Soviet bridgehead into a few hundred metres of river bank around the ruins of the borough of Vepsküla.

== Aftermath ==
=== Casualties ===
German losses were in the thousands in all sectors. There is no adequate account of the Soviet casualties.

=== Succeeding combat ===
In a surprise attack, the 1st Estonian Regiment split the Siivertsi bridgehead into three parts and 'rolled' it down on 5 March. A small Soviet bridgehead still left on the west bank was cleared by the II.Battalion, 2nd Estonian Regiment by 6 March.

Soviet aviation conducted an air raid, leveling the historical town of Narva. An air and artillery bombardment of 100,000 shells and bombs were aimed at the 11th SS Volunteer Panzergrenadier Division "Nordland" and the 4th SS Volunteer Panzergrenadier Brigade "Nederland" in Ivangorod on the opposite bank from Narva. It also prepared the 30th Guards Rifle Division's attack on 8 March. Simultaneous pitched battles took place north of the town, where the 14th Rifle Corps supported by artillery from the 8th Estonian Rifle Corps attempted to break through the defence of the 1st and 2nd Estonian Regiments. The defenders repulsed the attacks with great losses for the Soviets.

The Soviet air assaults against civilians in Estonian cities were aimed at forcing the Estonians away from supporting the Germans during the Soviet offensive. Soviet Long Range Aviation assaulted the Estonian capital Tallinn on the night before 9 March. Approximately 40% of the housing space was destroyed in the city, 500 civilians were killed, 25,000 people were left without shelter. The result of the air raid was the opposite to the Soviet aim, as the people felt disgusted by the Soviet atrocities and more men answered the German call.

The Soviet tank attack at Auvere station on 17 March was stopped by the 502nd Heavy Tank Battalion. Fierce fighting continued for another week until the Soviet forces were compelled to go onto the defensive after suffering many casualties. This enabled the "Narwa" to take the initiative.
