= Narva offensive (July 1944) =

1944 battle in Estonia during WW II

Coordinates: 59.3833°N 28.2000°E

Narva offensive (24–30 July 1944)
- Part of Eastern Front (World War II)
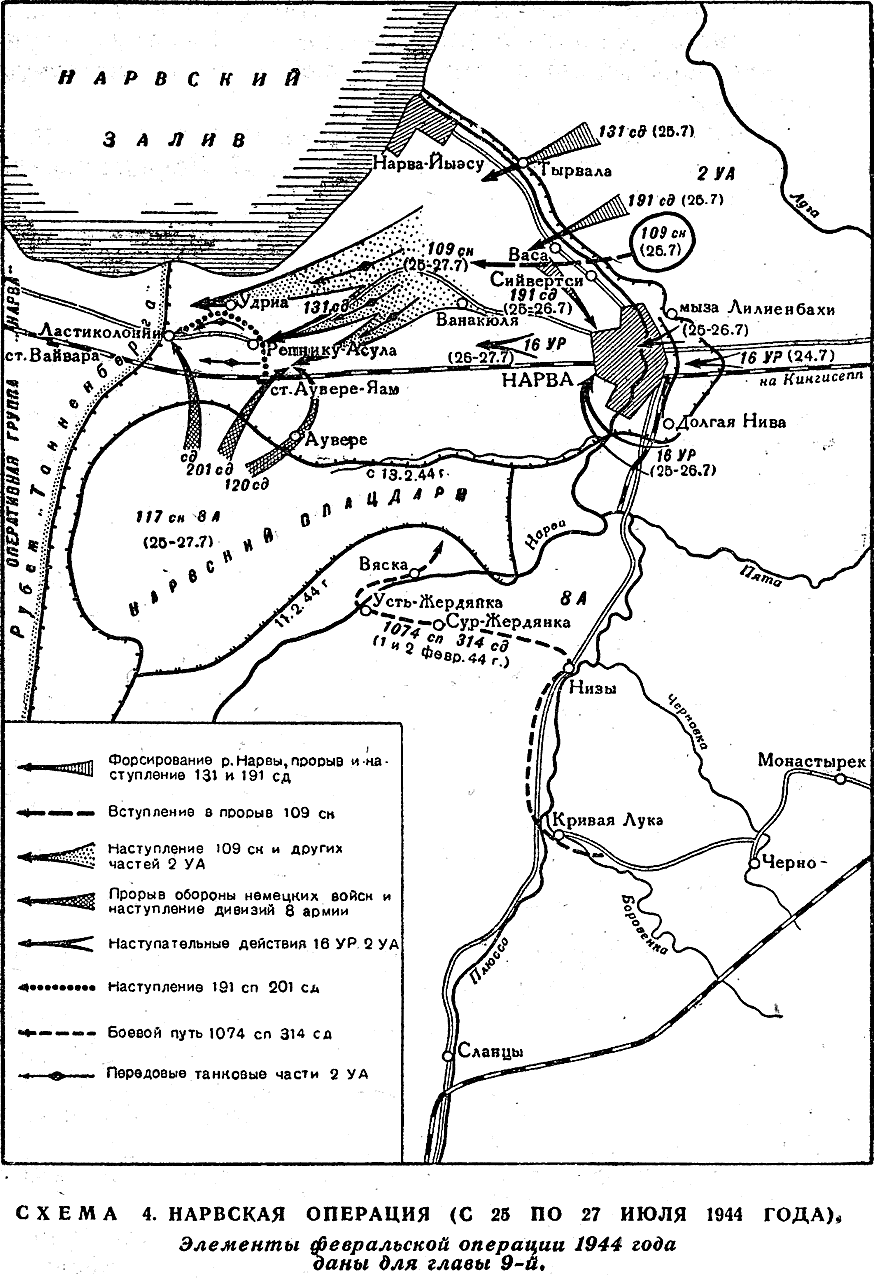
- Soviet map of the operation
Date	24–30 July 1944
Location	Narva, Estonia
Result	Soviet victory

Belligerents
(Nazi Germany) Germany	Soviet Union

Commanders and leaders
Felix Steiner	Leonid A. Govorov

Strength
35,000 troops 7 tanks 600 assault guns 137 aircraft	136,830 troops 150 armoured vehicles 2,500 assault guns 800+ aircraft

Casualties and losses
2,500 all causes	4,685 dead or missing 18,602 wounded or sick

This is a sub-article to Battle of Narva (1944).

The Narva offensive was a campaign fought between the German army detachment "Narwa" and the Soviet Leningrad Front for the city of Narva in 24–30 July 1944.

The Soviet breakthrough in Belorussia made the German Army Group North withdraw a large portion of their troops from Narva to the central part of the Eastern Front and to Finland. As there were no more sufficient forces for the defence of the former front line at Narva in July, the army group began preparations for the withdrawal of their forces to the Tannenberg defence line at the Sinimäed Hills 16 kilometres from Narva. While the command of the Soviet Leningrad Front was unaware of the preparations, they designed the Narva offensive. Shock troops from the Finnish front were concentrated near Narva, giving the Leningrad Front a 4:1 superiority both in manpower and equipment. Before the German forces had implemented the plan, the Soviet 8th Army launched the offensive with an assault at Auvere Railway Station. The Waffen Grenadier Regiment der SS 45 Estland (1st Estonian) and the 44th Infantry Regiment (which consisted in personnel from East Prussia) repulsed the attack, inflicting heavy losses to the 8th Army. The 11th SS Volunteer Panzergrenadier Division Nordland and 4th SS Volunteer Panzergrenadier Brigade Nederland stationed in Ivangorod left their positions quietly on the night before 25 July. The evacuation was carried out according to Obergruppenführer Felix Steiner's plans until the 2nd Shock Army resumed the offensive in the morning of 25 July. Supported by 280,000 shells and grenades from 1,360 assault guns, the army crossed the river north of the town. The II.Battalion, Waffen Grenadier Regiment der SS 46 (2nd Estonian) and II.Battalion, Waffen-Grenadier Regiment der SS 47 (3rd Estonian) kept the 2nd Shock Army from capturing the highway behind the retreating Nordland and Nederland detachments. The defensive cost the loss of the SS Volunteer Panzergrenadier Regiment 48 due to their tactical errors. The Soviet forces captured Narva on 26 July.

== Design ==
=== German ===
The Soviet success in Belorussia and Ukraine brought the Oberkommando des Heeres to propose a withdrawal of the army detachment "Narwa" and the 18th Army to the line between Riga and Daugavpils 400 kilometres south of Narva. The aim of the officers was to keep the battle front as short as possible and to use the available troops in Ukraine. On 12 July, Infantry General Johannes Frießner the commander of the army group proposed the plan to Hitler whose reaction was to stand or die at the Narva Line. Simultaneously, the German Headquarters had intelligence data on the Leningrad Front preparing for the Narva offensive. The Army Group North were out of reserves. Disregarding Hitler's order, Frießner ordered a new defensive line built, the Tannenberg Line (Tannenbergstellung), with the main defences located on the three Sinimäed Hills fifteen kilometres to the west of Narva. On 21 July, Frießner asked permission to withdraw to the prepared positions. As Hitler was afraid, the Finnish will of resistance would suffer from it, he informed the Finnish Chief of Defence about his plans. Finding out that the withdrawal to a new line was not considered a problem by the Finnish side, Hitler gave the order to retreat. The III (Germanic) SS Panzer Corps was to evacuate along Narva–Tallinn Highway. The 1st Estonian Regiment and the 44th Infantry Regiment were ordered to form the southern (left) rear guard while the II.Battalion, 2nd Estonian and the II.Battalion, 3rd Estonian were to cover the highway from the north.

=== Soviet ===
For the commencement of the Narva offensive operation on 24 July, most of the Soviet units and artillery were concentrated in the Krivasoo Bridgehead in the south. The Soviet operational goals were Auvere Railway Station and the borough of Sirgala placed north from the Soviet bridgehead. The first attack by the 8th Army was to be conducted by the 117th and the 122nd Rifle Corps. The rest of the 8th Army included the 124th and 112th Rifle Corps. Their goal was to break through the German defence of the railway station, while the 2nd Shock Army was to breach the defence of the III SS Panzer Corps stationed by the Narva River north of city. The 2nd Shock Army included the 131st and the 191st Rifle Divisions, the 109th Rifle Corps, the 8th Estonian Rifle Corps, two artillery brigades, the 328th Separate Heavy Artillery Division, four rocket artillery launcher regiments, the 760th Anti-Tank Regiment, and 62 armoured vehicles. The density of the assault guns in the northern sector was 160 per kilometre of front line. The two armies were to encircle and destroy the III SS Panzer Corps.

== Comparison of forces ==
The standing manpower in the Krivasoo Bridgehead was 46,385 Soviets attacking against the 17,100 German troops at the defence of Auvere station. Northwards from Narva, the situation was similar. The Soviet artillery had an eightfold superiority over its German counterpart. The Soviet air force consisted of 546 bombers against 49 German dive bombers. However, the Soviet headquarters were unaware of the recently constructed Tannenberg line, granting the army detachment "Narwa" an element of surprise.

== Combat activity ==
=== Auvere ===
In the morning of 24 July, the Soviet assault commenced with 30-50 batteries firing 17,000 shells and grenades (2,000 tons), inflicting significant casualties to the 1st Estonian Regiment stationed in the estate of Auvere and the 44th Infantry Regiment in the borough of Sirgala. After two hours of preparatory artillery fire, the two units were attacked by the 13th Air Army. Three German and eight Soviet bombers were shot down in the air combat. Under the artillery cover, the Soviet 122nd Rifle Corps and a tank brigade pierced into the East Prussian positions, while the 117th Rifle Corps encircled the I.Battalion, 1st Estonian Regiment who reformed themselves in a circular defence. Relieved by a company of the armoured Kausch’ Kampfgruppe and three Nebelwerfer rocket artillery launchers, the Estonians went on a counterattack. The 44th Infantry Regiment was saved by the swift movement of artillery behind them clearing their previous positions from the Soviets. Forces of the 117th Rifle Corps reached the headquarters of the I.Battalion, 1st Estonian Regiment who still resisted by heavy machine-gun fire in circular defence. The support of the anti-tank weapons of the 14th Company, I.Battalion and the aid provided by the “Nordland“ Division helped to seize the main front line back to the control of the I.Battalion. Subsequent attempts by units of the 8th Army to break through were repelled in a similar way, causing them to lose 3,000 men and 18 tanks, compared to the loss of 800+ troops of the 11th Infantry Division.

The Soviet attack at Auvere and Sirgala forced the III SS Panzer Corps to a hasty withdrawal from their positions in the Ivangorod bridgehead on the opposite bank of Narva. The Soviet 8th Army threatened to reach the Tannenberg Line before the German units. The Soviet scouts found out about the withdrawal while the Pioneer Battalion of the Nordland Division were blowing up the bridge. Due a mistake in placing the explosives, the bridge stayed intact.

=== 2nd Shock Army landing across the Narva ===
In the morning of 25 July 1360 Soviet assault guns fired 280,000 shells and grenades at the positions of the II.Battalion, 2nd Estonian Regiment and II.Battalion 3rd Estonian Regiment across the Narva River. The shock made the trenches collapse on both sides of the front line. After the artillery strike, the bombers and assault guns moved in to destroy the remaining strong points. The 131st and the 191st Rifle Corps were ordered to cross the river on boats and rafts, accompanied by "Svyaschennaya Voyna" and the anthem of the Soviet Union playing from the loudspeakers. The assault guns and the machine-guns of the Estonian battalions along with the dive bombers destroyed the first attempts of the 2nd Shock Army, until the Estonians ran out of ammunition. The focus of the Soviet attack drifted to the II.Battalion, 2nd Estonian Regiment causing it to lose coordination and retreat to the estate of Peeterristi on the highway nine kilometres outside Narva. The 131st Rifle Division advanced towards the highway, as the 191st Rifle Division turned south towards Narva to cut the SS panzer corps out.

=== Defence of III SS Panzer Corps's withdrawal ===
The Soviet advance to Narva was faced by the II.Battalion, 3rd Estonian Regiment deployed by the Narva River. SS-Obersturmbannführer Alfons Vilhelm Robert Rebane had saved the unit from the Soviet bombardment by ordering them to dig into new trenches on the night before. Aiming at the II.Battalion's positions according to their data, the artillery of the 2nd Shock Army had hit empty trenches. Inflicting heavy casualties to the 191st Rifle Division, the II.Battalion stopped the Soviets from getting to Narva. As the 131st Rifle Division threatened to cut between the II.battalion, 3rd Estonian and the II.Battalion, 2nd Estonian a further five kilometres to the west, Rebane shifted his front segment a kilometre towards the left (west) side and rounded them up to defend the highway by the estate of Olgina. The battalion repulsed the Soviet assaults and caused great casualties to the 556th and 546th Rifle Regiments.

In the estate of Peeterristi, Major Friedrich Kurg reassembled the 180 troops remained of the II.Battalion, 2nd Estonian Regiment to keep the 131st Rifle Division away from the highway and counterattacked. The 137-strong Luftflotte 1 was sent into the air to provide cover for the withdrawing III SS Panzer Corps. Despite their efforts, German aircraft were overwhelmed by the 800-plus 13th Air Army. Suffering the near destruction of the II.Battalion, 2nd Estonian, the joint Estonian defence line with the II.Battalion, 3rd Estonian four kilometres to the east held the Soviet attack, while the III SS Panzer Corps withdrew across the Narva Bridge to the Tannenberg Line. Behind them, the last troops of the SS panzer corps destroyed the highway with road destruction machinery.

The German units that failed to retreat on the agreed timetable, immediately faced heavy Soviet assaults. The main German casualty of the retreat to the Tannenberg Line were the 700 troops of the SS Volunteer Panzergrenadier Regiment 48 General Seyffardt. In the night before 26 July, the regiment was the last to leave Narva, while the Soviets were already gaining control of the highway behind them and Soviet armoured vehicles were crossing the Narva bridge. The II.Battalion, SS Volunteer Panzergrenadier Regiment 49 De Ruyter covering the retreat of the General Seyffardt, were rescued from encirclement by the I.Battalion, De Ruyter Regiment. Encircled in the swamps between the highway and the railway, the withdrawing General Seyffardt Regiment was pinned down by the ground-attack aircraft of the 13th Air Army and annihilated by the 191st Rifle Division.

== Result ==
In general, the withdrawal was completed according to the Steiner's plans. The De Ruyter Regiment started digging in on the left (northern) flank of the Tannenberg Line, the units of the 20th Waffen Grenadier Division of the SS (1st Estonian) in the centre, and the Nordland Division on the right (southern) flank. The Red Army captured Narva, ending the six-month struggle for the city. While the Soviets celebrated victory, their strategic goal – the encirclement of the III SS Panzer Corps and the destruction of Army Group North – remained unreached.

== Aftermath ==
The Soviet vanguard 201st and 256th Rifle Divisions attacked the Tannenberg Line and conquered a part of the easternmost of the three hills, the Orphanage Hill. An anti-tank unit of the Danmark Regiment returned the hill to the hands of the army detachment "Narwa" in the following night. Subsequent attempts of the Soviet tanks to conquer the hills were repulsed by the III SS Panzer Corps on the following day. The SS Reconnaissance Battalion 11 and the ferocious counterattack of the I.Battalion, Waffen Grenadier Regiment 47 (3rd Estonian) at the night before 28 July, subsequently collapsed under the Soviet tank fire while the I.Battalion was destroyed. In a pitched battle, carried into the next day without a break, the Soviet 2nd Shock Army and 8th Army forced the "Narwa" into new positions at the central Grenadier Hill.

The climax of the Battle of Tannenberg Line was the Soviet attack on 29 July. The shock units of the two Soviet armies suppressed the German resistance at the Orphanage Hill, while the Soviet main forces suffered heavy casualties in the subsequent assault at the Grenadier Hill. The Soviet tanks encircled it and the westernmost Tower Hill. At the same time, Steiner sent out the remaining seven German tanks, which hit the surprised Soviet armoured forces back. This enabled the I.Battalion, 1st Estonian Regiment to launch a fierce counterattack led by Hauptsturmführer Paul Maitla, re-conquering the Grenadier Hill to the hands of the SS troops. Casualties on both sides were incredibly heavy, and of the 136,000 Soviet soldiers on the frontline during the Narva offensive, >90% were casualties and the Soviet tank regiments required heavy refitting.

With the aid of swift reinforcements, the 2nd Shock Army and 8th Army continued their attacks. The Stavka demanded the destruction of the army detachment "Narwa" and the capture of town of Rakvere more than a hundred kilometres from Narva by 7 August. The 2nd Shock Army was back to 20,000 troops by 2 August, while their numerous attempts pursuing unchanged tactics failed to break the multinational defence of the "Narwa". Govorov terminated the Soviet offensive at the Sinimäed Hills on 10 August.
