= Alfons Rebane =

20th-century Estonian military commander

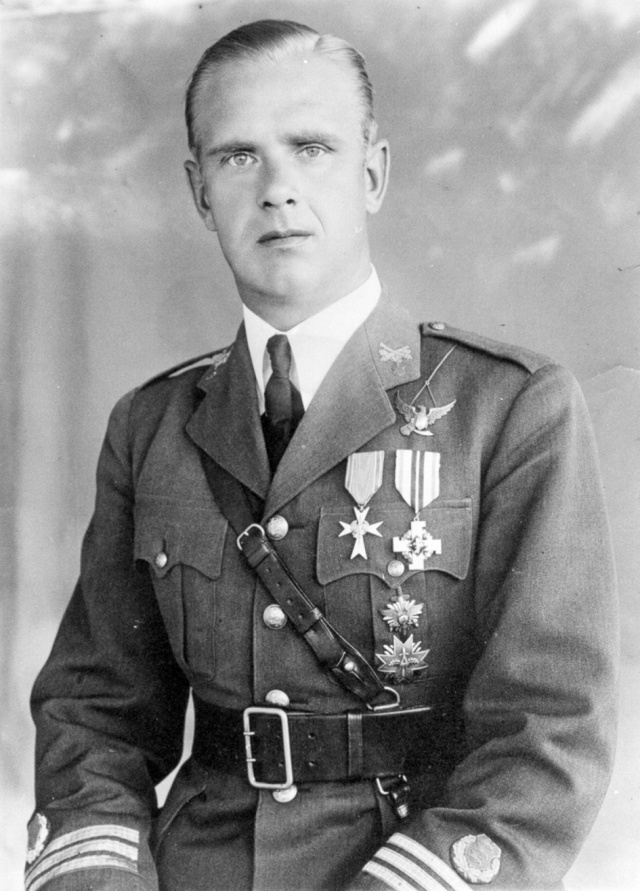
- Rebane in the Estonian Army
- Born: 24 June 1908; Valga, Livonia, Russian Empire
- Died: 8 March 1976 (aged 67); Augsburg, Bavaria, West Germany
- Military career
- Allegiance: Estonia; Germany; United Kingdom
- Branch: Estonian Army (1929–1940); German Army (1941–1944); Waffen-SS (1944–1945); Secret Intelligence Service (1947–1961)
- Service years: 1929–1940; 1941–1945; 1947–1961
- Rank: Waffen-Standartenführer; Colonel
- Units: 1929, 1st Armored Train Regiment; 1935, Viljandi County Territorial Regiment; 1939, Lääne County Territorial Regiment; 1940, Commandant of Lihula; 1941, 184th Security Battalion, Wehrmacht; 1943, 658th (Estonian) Ost Battalion, Wehrmacht; 1944, 20th Waffen Grenadier Division of the SS (1st Estonian); 1947 MI6
- Conflicts: World War II: Eastern Front
- Awards: Estonian Defence League White Cross 3rd Class; Latvian Aizsargi Cross of Merit; Iron Cross 2nd & 1st class Infantry Assault Badge; Knight's Cross of the Iron Cross with Oak Leaves; Close Combat Clasp; Eastern Front Medal
- Other work: MI6

Alfons Vilhelm Robert Rebane (24 June 1908 – 8 March 1976) was an Estonian military commander. He was the most highly decorated Estonian military officer during World War II, serving in various Wehrmacht and Waffen-SS units of Nazi Germany.

After World War II Rebane joined the British Secret Intelligence Service (MI6) where he played a key role in assisting the armed resistance to Soviet rule in Estonia and other Baltic countries. He led the Estonian portion of MI6's Operation Jungle well into the 1950s.

In 1961, Rebane retired from the British intelligence services and moved to Germany, where he stayed until his death in Augsburg in 1976. The 1999 reburial of Rebane in Estonia with state honors triggered a number of controversies.

== Early life ==
Rebane was born in Valga in southern Estonia, then part of the Governorate of Livonia of the Russian Empire. In 1920 Rebane, son of a railway official, attended the Russian secondary school in Narva. From 1926 to 1929 he attended Tartu University and graduated from the Estonian Military Academy with first class honours. He served as an infantry officer on the armoured train "Captain Irv" of the 1st Armored Train Regiment as a second lieutenant in 1929. Married in 1931 to Agnia Soomets, they had one daughter Tiiu who died soon afterwards. On Estonian Independence Day on 24 February 1933, Rebane was promoted to first lieutenant. From 1935 to 1939 he served as junior instructor in the Defence League Viljandi County Territorial Regiment, between 1939 and 1940 in the Lääne County Territorial Regiment. From January to June 1940 Rebane was the Commandant of Lihula.

== World War II ==
Rebane served as an officer in the Estonian Army until Soviet troops occupied the country in 1940. The Soviets disbanded and absorbed most of the Estonian Armed Forces and arrested and executed the entire Estonian high command. Many junior officers, such as Rebane, were dismissed due to their lack of "political reliability" and were liable to be deported. For a while, Rebane worked in construction, then fled into the forests when the Soviets began mass deportations in 1941. He established and led a group of Forest Brothers in Virumaa (Northern Estonia) in May 1941.

After Germany had taken control of Estonia, Rebane joined the German Wehrmacht where he served in its combat formations in Northwestern Russia, subsequently becoming the captain of the 184th Security Battalion, which was later renamed to the Estonian 658th Eastern Battalion. In February 1944 Rebane's unit was transferred to the Narva Front and attached to the Wehrmacht's 26th Army Corps on 2 March. On 27 April 1944, the unit was released from the Wehrmacht. Rebane, after initially refusing, was forced to join the newly formed 20th Waffen Grenadier Division of the SS (1st Estonian) of the Waffen-SS, eventually becoming colonel of the 47th Waffen-Grenadier Regiment. The Estonian division played a significant role in the Battle of Narva and the Battle of Emajõgi, holding back the Soviet re-occupation of Estonia until the Soviet Tallinn Offensive, September 1944 while suffering heavy casualties. Rebane's unit was then evacuated to Germany for refitting and saw more action on the Eastern Front in the spring of 1945. Rebane had a reputation for tactical skill. With most of the Estonian forces captured by the Soviet Army in Czechoslovakia, Rebane managed to reach the British Occupation Zone with a number of his men at the end of the war. Soldiers who fought in units under his command were colloquially referred to as "fox cubs" (Rebane translates to "fox" in Estonian).

== Decorations ==
According to Carlos Jurado, an expert on non-German units, and Nigel Thomas: Rebane was "the most decorated and probably the most talented and charismatic Baltic soldier during WWII". Rebane became one of the most decorated Estonians. During his days in the Estonian Army, he was awarded the Defence League White Cross 3rd Class and the Latvian Aizsargi Cross of Merit. In the German army he was awarded the Iron Cross first and second class, the War Merit Cross with swords second class, the Eastern Front Medal, the silver Infantry Assault Badge and the silver Ostvolk Medal for bravery. Rebane was also decorated with the silver Close Combat Clasp, awarded for hand-to-hand fighting by unsupported infantry for a total of 30 days. In February 1944 he was awarded the Knight's Cross of the Iron Cross and in April 1945 he was promoted to Waffen-Standartenführer and awarded the Knight's Cross with Oakleaves for extreme bravery on the battlefield.

== Post war ==
In 1947 Rebane moved to England and joined the British Secret Intelligence Service (MI6) as the Estonian expert at the Intelligence School in London. There he played a key role in assisting the armed resistance to the Soviet rule in Estonia and other Baltic countries. He led the Estonian portion of MI6's Operation Jungle well into the 1950s. In 1961, Rebane retired from the British intelligence services and moved to Germany, where he stayed until his death in Augsburg in 1976.

== Legacy ==
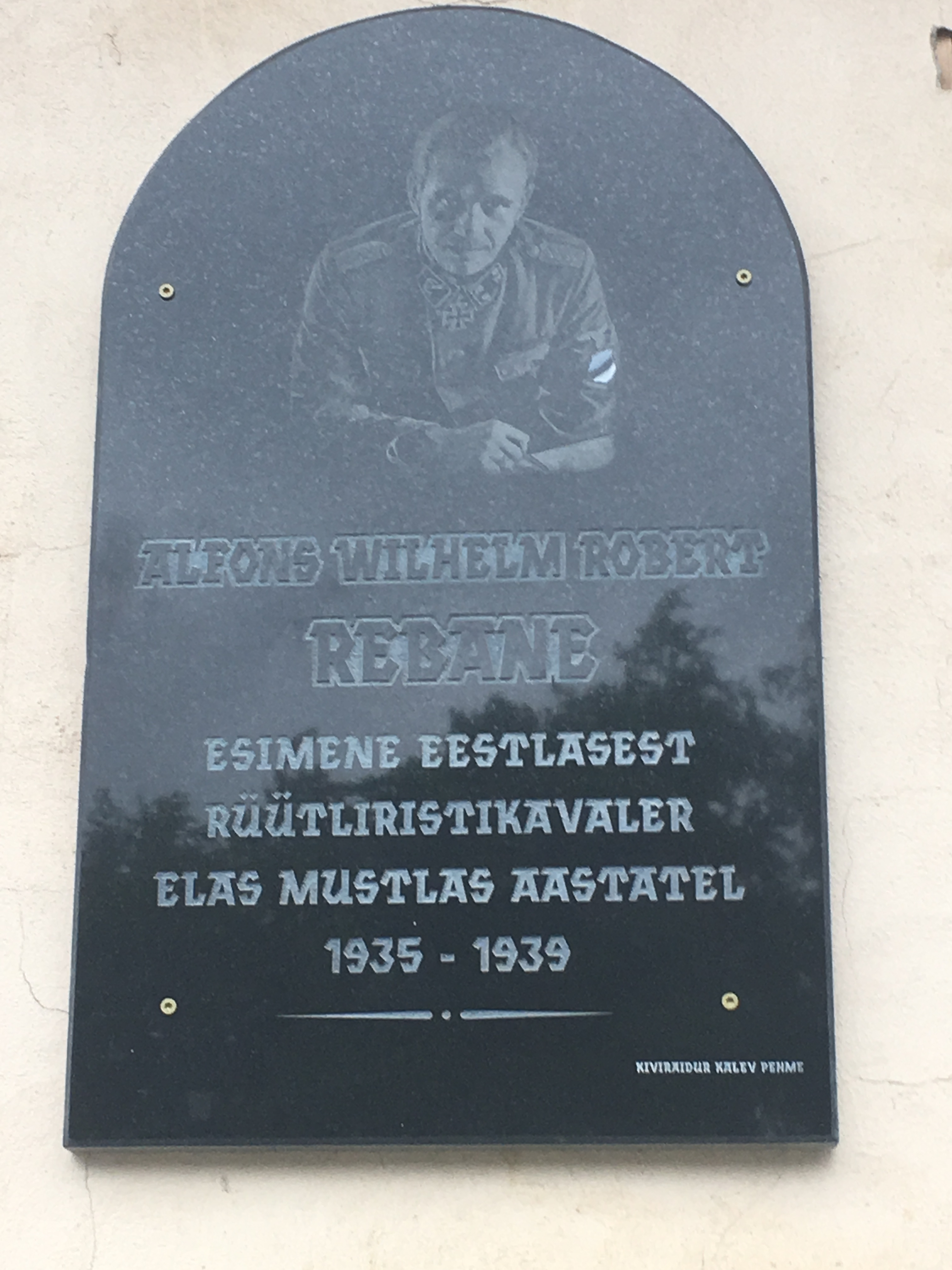
Plaque in tribute to Alfons Rebane in Mustla

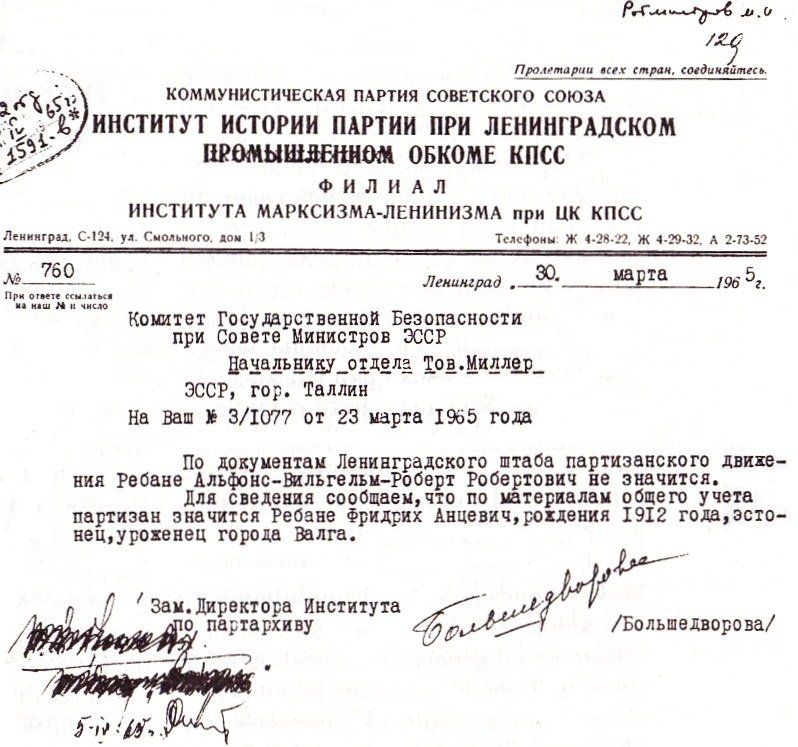
Document from Moscow archive to Estonian SSR that declares that they don't have any information suggesting that Alfons Rebane participated in any war crimes. 1965.

In 1977, Patrice Chairoff and Beate Klarsfeld alleged Rebane was a war criminal. According to a 2005 report published by the Estonian State Commission on the Examination of the Policies of Repression, investigations conducted by the KGB after World War II found no documents confirming the accusation against Rebane and his "army unit".

The return and reburial of Rebane's ashes with military honours at a national cemetery in 1999 in Estonia sparked a controversy. The American Jewish Congress protested that the reburial served as an "indication that fascist ideology is recognized in Estonia". A tombstone to Rebane, unofficially erected in 2004 but unveiled before Pärnumaa District Parliamentarian and former Foreign Minister Trivimi Velliste, was protested by Russia's Chief Rabbi, Berl Lazar and the Russian Jewish Congress.

The Estonian authorities assert that the Estonian Waffen-SS units engaged solely in combat operations at the front to defend Estonia's independence and had nothing to do with punitive operations in the territories occupied by the Nazi Germany. According to the President of Estonia Toomas Hendrik Ilves "We are witnesses to the information war against Estonia which already reminds of an ideological aggression". According to the editor of Virumaa Teataja newspaper Rein Sikk: "Alfons Rebane was a good soldier according to our historians. He was never convicted of war crimes and [the allegations] are just a political game to try to show that Estonia has lots of fascists."

In June 2018, a plaque commemorating Rebane, depicted in Waffen SS uniform, was unveiled on the wall of a private building in Mustla where he had lived. The Russian Ministry of Foreign Affairs protested the unveiling.

== Awards ==
- Iron Cross (1939)
  - 2nd Class (9 April 1943)
  - 1st Class (9 November 1943)
- Knight's Cross of the Iron Cross with Oak Leaves
  - Knight's Cross on 23 February 1944 as Major and commander of the Estonian voluntary battalion 658
  - 875th Oak Leaves on 9 May 1945 as Obersturmbannführer and commander of Waffen-Grenadier-Regiment of the SS 46 (Note: Alfons Rebane received the Knight's Cross of the Iron Cross on 23 February 1944 as Major and commander of the estnisches Freiwilligen-Bataillon 658 in the 28. Jäger-Division, at the time a Wehrmacht division and not part of the Waffen-SS. His nomination of the Oak Leaves was submitted to the Heeres Personalamt (Army Staff Office) on 12 April 1945. The German Federal Archives only hold a copy of the nomination. There is no indication or remark that the nomination was processed. The nomination list for the higher grade of the Knight's Cross with Oak Leaves dates the nomination on 2 April 1945. This list also gives no indication that the nomination had been processed. The Order Commission of the Association of Knight's Cross Recipients (AKCR) processed this case in 1974 and decided: 875th Oak Leaves on 8 May 1945. The sequential number "875" was assigned by the AKCR, the date was later changed by Fellgiebel to 9 May 1945. Rebane was member of the AKCR.)
