= Battle of Auvere =

1944 military conflict in Estonia during WW II

Coordinates: 59°21′02″N 27°55′50″E

- Part of World War II, Battle of Narva (1944)
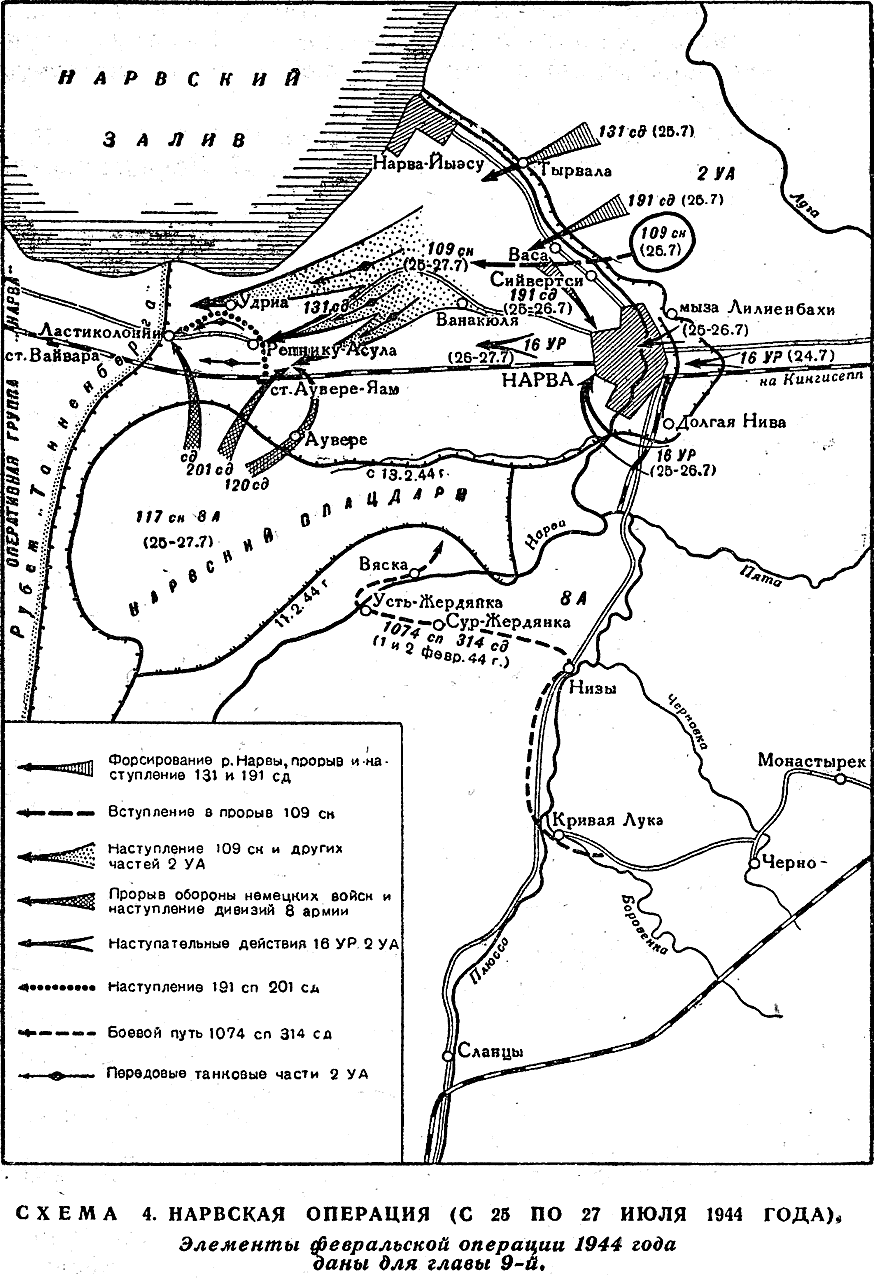
- Soviet map of Narva Operation (24–30 July)
Date	20–25 July 1944
Location	Auvere, Estonia
Result	German defensive victory

Belligerents
Germany	Soviet Union

Commanders and leaders
Felix Steiner	Filip Starikov

Units involved
20th SS Division (1st Estonian); 11th Infantry Division	122nd Rifle Corps; 117th Rifle Corps

Strength
17,100 personnel 4–6 batteries 49 dive bombers	46,385 personnel 30–50 batteries 546 bombers

Casualties and losses
200 dead 600 wounded	3,000 all causes 17 fighters 29 tanks

Battle of Auvere took place in Estonia, starting on 20 July 1944 and ending on 25 July during World War II. It was a part of the Narva campaign.

== Operational history ==
The Soviet 8th Army started attacking the Auvere Station on 20 July with artillery fire. The defenders had some losses. The Estonians and Germans (of the 11th (East Prussian) Infantry Division) had built trenches and dug themselves into foxholes. On the morning of 24 July, the Soviet assault commenced with 30–50 batteries firing 17,000 shells and grenades (2,000 tons), inflicting significant casualties to the Estonian 45th Regiment in Auvere and the 44th Infantry Regiment in the borough of Sirgala.

After two hours of preparatory artillery fire, the two regiments were attacked from the air. Three German and eight Soviet bombers were shot down in air combat. Under artillery cover, the Soviet 122nd Rifle Corps and a tank brigade pierced to the German positions, while the 117th Rifle Corps encircled the Estonian regiment, which reformed themselves in circular defence.

Relieved by Paul Albert Kausch's Kampfgruppe (the "Nordland" Tank Battalion with additional units) and three rocket artillery launchers, the Estonians went on for a counterattack. The 44th Regiment was saved by the swift movement of artillery behind them clearing their previous positions of Soviet troops. The 117th Rifle Corps reached the headquarters of the Estonian I Battalion, who resisted by heavy machine-gun fire in circular defence. The support by the anti-tank weapons of the 14th Company and Kausch's Kampfgruppe helped to seize the main frontline back to the control of the "Narwa".

The attempts by the 117th and the 122nd Rifle Corps to break through were repelled in a similar way, causing them to lose 3,000 men, 17 planes and 29 tanks, compared to the loss of 800 troops of army detachment "Narwa". On the next day, the Soviet 8th Army tried to capture the German positions again, but they were repelled by machine guns.

== Forces ==
Germany

- III SS Corps
  - 11th Infantry Division
  - 20th Estonian SS Division
    - 45th Estonian Regiment
    - First Battalion, 47th Estonian Regiment
    - 20th Estonian Fusilier Battalion (former Battalion Narwa)

Soviet Union

- 8th Army
  - 122nd Rifle Corps
  - 117th Rifle Corps
