= Narva offensive (15–28 February 1944) =

Battle in Estonia during WW II

Coordinates: 59.3833°N 28.2000°E

- Part of Eastern Front (World War II)
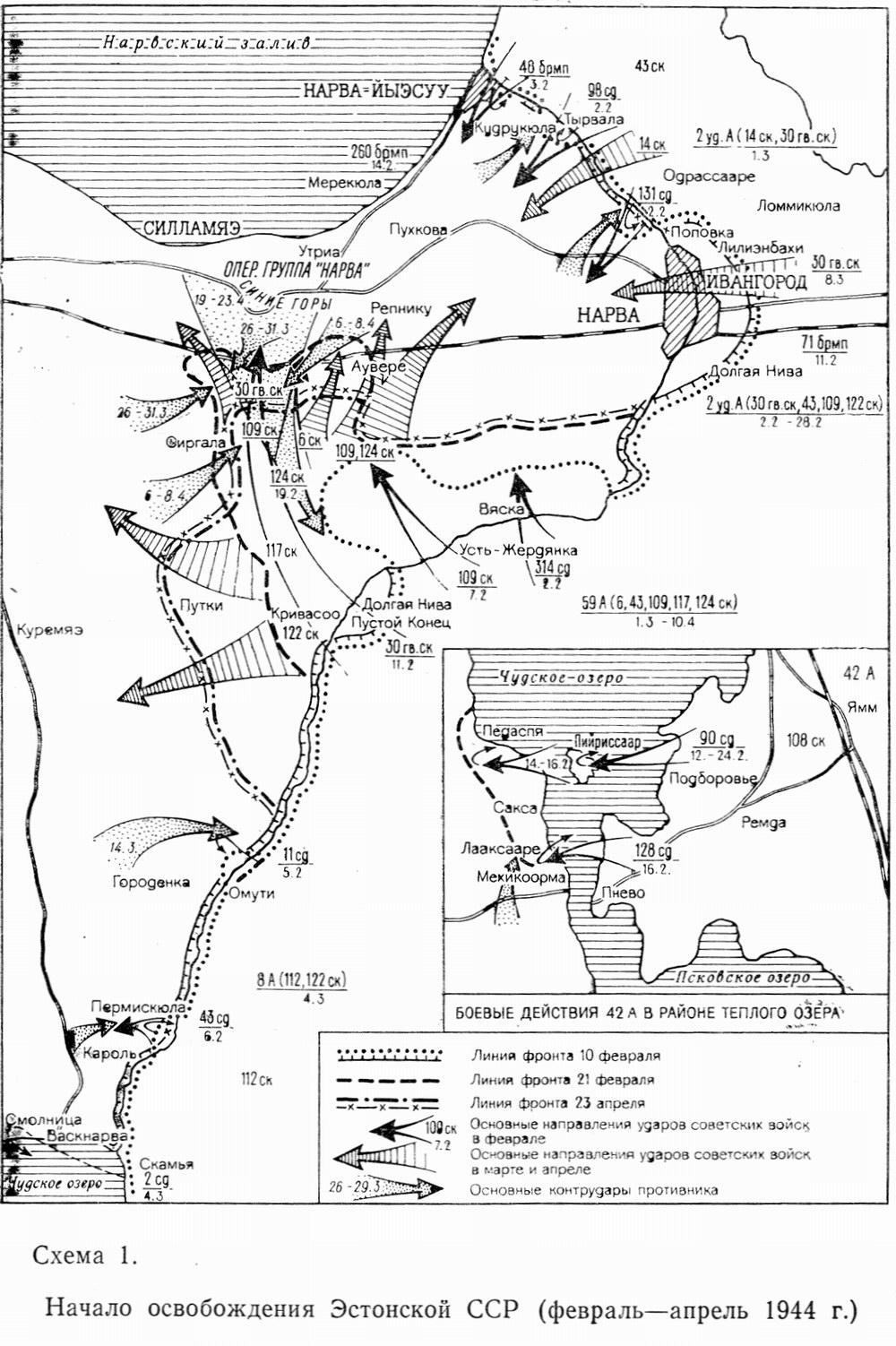
- Soviet map of the beginning of Estonian Operation (February – April 1944)
Date	15 – 28 February 1944
Location	Narva, Estonia
Result	German defensive victory

Belligerents
Germany	Soviet Union

Commanders and leaders
(Nazi Germany) Johannes Frießner	(Soviet Union) Leonid A. Govorov

Strength
123,541; 100 armoured vehicles 1,500 artillery pieces 400 aircraft	200,000

Casualties and losses
Unknown	Unknown

This is a sub-article to Battle of Narva (1944).

The Narva offensive (15–28 February 1944) was a campaign fought between the German army detachment "Narwa" and the Soviet Leningrad Front for the strategically important Narva Isthmus. At the time of the operation, Stalin was personally interested in taking Estonia, viewing it as a precondition for forcing Finland out of the war. The 2nd Shock Army expanded the bridgehead in the Krivasoo swamp south of Narva, temporally cutting the railway behind the Sponheimer Group. Army General Leonid Govorov was unable to take advantage of the opportunity of encircling the smaller German army group which called in reinforcements. These came mostly from the newly mobilised Estonians who were motivated to resist the looming Soviet re-occupation. The Soviet 30th Guards Rifle Corps and the 124th Rifle Corps, which resumed the Soviet operation, were exhausted by the III (Germanic) SS Panzer Corps in ferocious battles. The offensive was halted on 20 February. Symbolically coinciding with the Estonian Independence Day on 24 February, the fresh 45th and 46th SS Waffen Grenadier Regiments (1st and 2nd Estonian), destroyed the Soviet Riigiküla bridgehead north of Narva.

== Background ==
Breaking through the Narva Isthmus situated between the Gulf of Finland and Lake Peipus was of major strategic importance to the Soviet Armed Forces. The success of the Estonian Operation would have provided an unobstructed advance along the coast to Tallinn, forcing Army Group North to withdraw from Estonia for fear of becoming encircled. For the Baltic Fleet, trapped in an eastern bay of the Gulf of Finland, Tallinn was the closest exit to the Baltic Sea. Army Group North's removal from Estonia would have exposed southern Finland to air and amphibious assaults coming from Estonian bases. The prospect of an advance to East Prussia through Estonia appealed even more to the Soviet Main Command, as it appeared to bring German resistance close to collapse. Leonid Govorov, commander of the Leningrad Front, and Vladimir Tributz, commander of the Baltic Fleet, prepared a scheme to destroy Army Group North. Stalin ordered the capture of Narva at all costs no later than 17 February:

"It is mandatory that our forces seize Narva no later than 17 February 1944. This is required both for military as well as political reasons. It is the most important thing right now. I demand that you undertake all necessary measures to liberate Narva no later than the period indicated. (signed) I. Stalin"

After the failure of the Leningrad Front to fulfil the order, Stalin gave a new order on 22 February: to break through the German defence, capture the southern Estonian port of Pärnu, cut off the German troops in Estonia, direct two armies at southeastern Estonia, keep going through Latvia, and open the road to East Prussia and Central Europe. On 22 February, with their offensive having been stalled for three weeks, the Soviet Union presented Finland with peace conditions. While Finland regarded the terms as unacceptable, the war raging around them appeared dangerous enough to keep negotiating. To push Finland into unfavourable peace conditions, Stalin needed to take Estonia. Stalin's wish was an order to the commanders of the Leningrad Front - with their heads at stake.

== Preceding combat ==
The artillery of the 2nd Shock army opened fire on German positions on 11 February south of Narva. The 30th Guards Rifle Corps, an elite unit usually used in breaching defence lines, joined the Soviet units attempting to seize the Auvere station. The guards riflemen widened the bridgehead to ten kilometres along the front. The remains of the German 227th and 170th Infantry Divisions retreated. General Major Romantsov ordered an air and artillery assault on the village of Auvere with the 64th Guards Rifle Division seizing it in a surprise attack on 13 February. Half a kilometre westward from Auvere railway station, the 191st Guard Rifle Regiment cut the railway two kilometres from the Tallinn highway, which was the last way out for the Sponheimer Group, but they were denied by the 170th Infantry Division and the 502nd Tank Battalion. The Soviet 98th and 131st Rifle Divisions (43rd Rifle Corps) established a bridgehead on the west bank of the Narva river stretching from the Siivertsi outskirts of the city of Narva to Riigiküla on 12 February.

The 517-strong Soviet naval infantry brigade commenced their Mereküla Landing operation on 14 February, landing directly in front of the German coastal artillery. The Norge Regiment and the coastal guards, supported by three Tiger I tanks quickly responded. While the 2nd Shock Army artillery placed near Auvere failed to begin their attack at the agreed time, in seven and a half hours of fierce fighting, the Soviet beachhead was annihilated.

== Preparations ==
=== Soviet ===
On 9 February, Army General Leonid Govorov of the Leningrad Front ordered the 2nd Shock Army to break through the German defence line north and south of the town of Narva by 17 February, move the front fifty kilometres westwards and continue towards the town of Rakvere. Soviet units with experience from the Siege of Leningrad had a significant number of women within their ranks. Retreat was forbidden under the penalty of death. After the initial failure to fulfill Govorov's orders, Lieutenant General Ivan Fedyuninsky, in charge of the 2nd Shock Army, landed the 13th Rifle Division from the reserve across the Narva River at the Krivasoo Bridghehead to support the 30th Guards Rifle Corps' offensive aimed at the Auvere station. As another reserve, Fedyuninsky brought in the 124th Rifle Corps on 20 February, reinforcing it with the artillery of the destroyed divisions.

=== German ===
The 20th Estonian SS Volunteer Division was moved in over the week following 13 February. The division, reinforced by newly conscripted Estonians, were attached to the III (Germanic) SS Panzer Corps. They were to defend the line against the 378th Rifle Division, the 340th Machine-Gun Battalion, and the 803th Zenith Artillery Regiment at the Riigiküla Bridgehead seven kilometres to the north of Narva town. As this was the main Soviet direction of attack for the moment, the Estonians frantically fortified the line with minefields, barbed wire covered by a large number of artillery pieces across the river north of the bridgehead. The terrain was well known to some of the Estonians, as an army rifle practice field had been located on the spot before the war.

== Deployments ==
=== Soviet ===
- 30th Guards Rifle Corps - Lieutenant General Nikolai Simonyak
- 43rd Rifle Corps - Major General Anatoli Andreyev
- 109th Rifle Corps - Major General Ivan Alferov
- 124th Rifle Corps - Major General Voldemar Damberg
- 46th, 260th and 261st Separate Guards Heavy Tank and 1902nd Separate Self-propelled Artillery regiments
- 3rd Breakthrough Artillery Corps - Major General N. N. Zhdanov
- 3rd Guards Tank Corps - Major General I. A. Vovchenko

=== German ===
Army Group North ordered the deployment of the "Narwa" army detachment on 22 February in the following positions: III SS Panzer Corps to the north of Narva and the bridgehead on the east bank of the river, the XXXXIII Army Corps against the Krivasoo bridgehead south of the city and the XXVI Army Corps to the sector between the Krivasoo and Lake Peipus. As of 1 March 1944, there were a total of 123,541 personnel subordinated to the army group in the order of battle shown directly below:

- XXVI Army Corps - General der Infanterie Anton Grasser
- XXXXIII Army Corps - General der Infanterie Karl von Oven
- III (Germanic) SS Panzer Corps - SS-Obergruppenführer Felix Martin Julius Steiner

Separate units:

- Eastern Sector, Coastal Defence (Staff of 2nd Anti-Aircraft Division as HQ) - Lieutenant General Alfons Luczny
  - Estonian Regiment "Reval"
  - 3 Estonian police battalions
  - 2 Estonian Eastern Battalions

Other military units:

- Artillery Command No. 113
- High Pioneer Command No. 32
- 502nd Heavy Tank Battalion
- 752nd Anti-Tank Battalion
- 540th Special Infantry (Training) Battalion

== Situation ==
The situation on the Narva Front was turning into a catastrophe for the Germans of Army Group North in mid-February. The Leningrad Front had formed two bridgeheads north and south of the city, the closest of them a few hundred metres from the Narva–Tallinn Highway. The Sponheimer Group was in danger of being surrounded. The defence of the highway was assigned to small infantry units formed from the 9th and 10th Luftwaffe Field Divisions, supported by Panther tanks deployed every few hundred metres along the highway. They obscured direct observation of the highway by placing spruce tree branches along it. This, however, did not distract Soviet artillery from keeping the highway under constant bombardment. The faith of the Sponheimer Group, that the defence could go on like this, started to diminish.

== Combat activity ==
=== South of Narva ===
After a heavy artillery strike on 15 February, the Soviet 45th Rifle Guard Division broke through to the railway 500 metres to the west of Auvere station, but a powerful attack by German Junkers Ju 87 dive bombers pinned them down. The Narva–Tallinn railway, supplying the III SS Panzer Corps around the city, was cut in two places, threatening to encircle the German detachment. In the course of the action, the Soviet 30th Guards Rifle Corps lost 7,773 troops and ceased to exist as a combat-ready unit. Units of the Sponheimer Group went on to the counterattack, stopping the Soviet rifle corps' advance. Despite heavy resistance from the German 61st Infantry Division, the rifle corps mounted a powerful strike behind the railway. Johannes Frießner, in charge of the army group, hurried his forces southward against the 124th Rifle Corps advance. The German 61st Infantry Division and the German Panzer Division Feldherrnhalle 1, supported by the 502nd Heavy Tank Battalion, drove the rifle corps back to the swamp in a pitched battle. After the offensive, the weakened Soviet 30th Guards Rifle Corps was replaced by the 109th Rifle Corps. The 214th Infantry Division cut a rifle division off from the rest of their forces on 28 February. The 43rd Soviet Rifle Corps restored the situation.

=== North of Narva ===
Steiner threw the Estonian Division into battle on 20 February. Being the first into Narva, the division had the 1st and 2nd Estonian Regiments separate the two bridgeheads at Riigiküla and Sliversti on 21 February. The failure of their follow-up attacks made it clear that direct assaults were impossible because of the batteries across the river. Instead, "rolling" tactics learned by officers in the Estonian National Defence College before World War II were applied. This meant placing small shock platoons in the Soviet trenches, which the artillery found impossible to spot. It was considered a matter of national honour to annihilate the Soviet bridgehead by 24 February - Estonian Independence Day. The bridgehead was reinforced with the 1078th Rifle Regiment of the 314th Rifle Division, increasing the number of defenders to 776 and 14 assault guns. The Leningrad Front command was convinced by well-placed artillery fire forcing back every possible attack. The II.Battalion, 2nd Estonian Regiment, and the German artillery appeared as if committing a direct assault while a platoon of the 6th Company threw themselves into the Soviet trenches. At first, the Soviets resisted but after running out of hand grenades, they were forced to retreat over the frozen river.

== Aftermath ==
=== South of Narva ===
The setbacks on the Narva front came as an unpleasant surprise for the leadership of the Leningrad Front, blaming it on the arrival of the Estonian Division. Since the beginning of January, the Leningrad Front had lost 227,440 troops killed, wounded or missing in action, which constituted more than half of the troops who participated in the Leningrad–Novgorod strategic offensive. Both sides rushed in reinforcements. The 59th Army was brought to Narva and the 8th Estonian Rifle Corps placed under the command of the Leningrad Front. The newly arrived army attacked westwards from the Krivasoo bridgehead south of Narva and encircled the strongpoints of the 214th Infantry Division and two Estonian Eastern Battalions. The resistance of the encircled units gave the German command time to move in all available forces and to stop the 59th Army advance.

=== North of Narva ===
The next task for the Estonian Division was the destruction of the Siivertsi Bridgehead defended by the 1,100-strong 378th Rifle Division equipped with 20 assault guns. The attack was commanded by Standartenführer Paul Vent. The 1st Estonian Regiment made a direct assault on the bridgehead on 29 February. Simultaneously, the 2nd Estonian Regiment, in their attempt to attack from the left flank, ran into Soviet fortifications and a minefield, which was crossed. As the I.Battalion, 2nd Estonian Regiment had lost almost all of its officers, Unterscharführer Harald Nugiseks stepped in as the leader of the attack. He immediately changed tactics, loading a quantity of hand-grenades onto some sledges, so that the attackers would not have to crawl back for the supplies over the minefield. With the hand-grenades passed along the trenches, the bridgehead was squeezed in from the north by the "rolling" tactics. The SS Panzergrenadier Regiment 24 Danmark took Siivertsi cemetery, attacking from the northern suburbs of Narva, but they could not destroy a Soviet machine gun strongpoint inside a massive granite monument erected in honour of the perished soldiers of the White Northwestern Army during the Estonian War of Independence. Eventually, the machine gunners were killed by a flamethrower. Another machine gun strong point was in the wreck of a Tiger tank, which was destroyed by Ago Loorpärg, who fired at it with a captured Soviet 45 mm gun. The Soviet bridgehead was squeezed into a few hundred metres of riverbank around the ruins of the borough of Vepsküla by 5 March. In a surprise attack by the 1st Estonian Regiment, the bridgehead was split into three parts and "rolled"-down hand grenades. A small Soviet bridgehead still left on the west bank was cleared by the II.Battalion, 2nd Estonian Regiment on 6 March.
