= 3rd Guards Tank Division =

Tank division of the Soviet military

The 3rd Guards 'Kotelnikovo' Tank Division (Russian: 3-я гвардейская танковая Котельниковская Краснознамённая ордена Суворова дивизия) (Military Unit Number 44181) was an armoured division of the Soviet Ground Forces, formed in 1945 and disestablished in 1989.

The division was formed from the previous 3rd Guards Tank Corps. At the beginning of the Battle of Narva (1944) in February 1944 the 3rd Guards Tank Corps was directly reporting to Leningrad Front, and was led by Major General I. A. Vovchenko.

The organisation of the division before being reduced:

- Division Headquarters, Zaslonovo, Lepel, Vitebsk
- 430th Independent Communications Battalion
- 33rd Independent Guards Reconnaissance Battalion
- 3rd Guards Tank Regiment
- 18th Guards Tank Regiment
- 126th Guards Tank Regiment
- 296th Guards Motorised Rifle Regiment
- 733rd Artillery Regiment
- 256th Independent Missile Battalion
- 740th Anti-Aircraft Missile Regiment
- 154th Independent Engineer-Sapper Battalion
- 92nd Independent Equipment Maintenance and Recovery Battalion
- 1018th Independent Materiel Supply Battalion
- 160th Independent Medical Battalion
- Unknown Chemical Defence Company

In June 1989 it was reduced to a Weapons and Equipment Storage Base, and in November 1989 it was disbanded completely. It spent much of the Cold War based at Zaslonovo in the Byelorussian Soviet Socialist Republic/Belorussian Military District as part of the 7th Tank Army.
