= 658th Eastern Battalion =

Estonian military unit, part of Wehrmacht

Ost Bataillon 658
- Country: Nazi Germany
- Branch: Army
- Role: Front-line combat
- Size: Battalion
- Part of: 18th Army, 26th Army

Commanders
- Notable commanders: Alfons Rebane

The 658th Eastern Battalion (German: Ost-Bataillon 658) was an Eastern Front World War II military unit of the Wehrmacht composed of Estonians. It was formed on 23 October 1942 from the merger of the 181st Security Group and two companies each from both the 183rd and 185th Security Groups, subordinated under the 18th Army (Wehrmacht). The 181st, 183rd and 185th security groups were originally formed on August 21, 1941, for the purposes of securing supply lines and clearing the 18th Army rear area of remaining Red Army troops and partisans, but were committed to front-line combat duties from October 1941. Captain Alfons Rebane, a former Estonian Army officer, was appointed commander.

In February 1943 the Battalion was sent to the front near Krasny Bor southeast of Leningrad where participated in repelling a major Soviet offensive on 19 March 1943. This action resulted in eight Estonians being recommended for the Iron Cross. The Battalion was moved to the frontline near Lake Ilmen in the spring of 1943, then to the Volkov River 18 km north of Novgorod on May 18. When the Red Army launched the Leningrad–Novgorod Offensive the following year on 14 January 1944, the 658th Battalion was redeployed during the night to Syrkovo village located north west of Novgorod where it repelled an attacking Soviet division, blocking their advance to Novgorod. Fighting continued around the area until February 5. For these battles the Commander of the 658th Battalion, Major Alfons Rebane, was awarded the Knight's Cross of the Iron Cross.

On 15 February 1944, the 658th Battalion, along with the 659th and 660th, were deployed to the Narva front under the command of the XXVI Corps. The Battalion was then subsequently dissolved and its personnel drafted into the 47th Waffen-Grenadier Regiment 2nd Battalion of the newly formed 20th SS Division in April 1944.

== See also ==
- Estonian Auxiliary Police
