= Narva offensive (18–24 March 1944) =

1944 battle in Estonia during WW II

Coordinates: 59.3833°N 28.2000°E

- Part of Eastern Front (World War II)
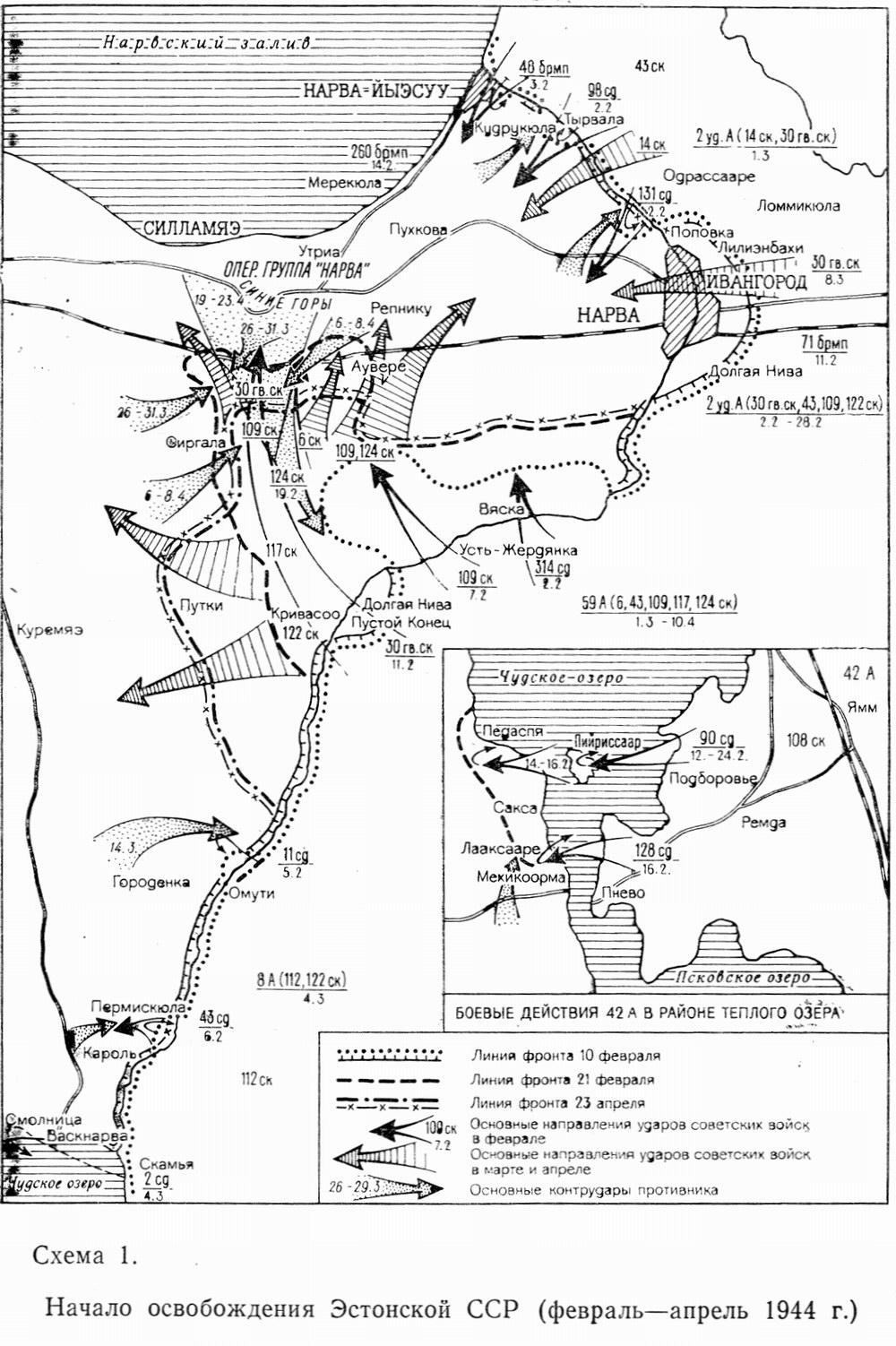
- Soviet map of the beginning of the Estonian Operation (February – April 1944)
Date	18–24 March 1944
Location	Narva, Estonia
Result	German defensive victory

Belligerents
(Nazi Germany) Germany	Soviet Union

Commanders and leaders
(Nazi Germany) Karl von Oven	(Soviet Union) Ivan Korovnikov

Strength
1 infantry division, some artillery, armoured vehicles and aircraft	6 rifle divisions 2500 artillery 100 armoured vehicles 800 aircraft

Casualties and losses
	38 armoured vehicles 21 artillery pieces

This is a sub-article to Battle of Narva.

The Narva offensive (18–24 March 1944) was a campaign fought between the German XXXXIII Army Corps and the Soviet 59th Army for the Narva Isthmus. At the time of the operation, Joseph Stalin was personally interested in taking Estonia, viewing it as a precondition for forcing Finland out of the war. The Soviet tank assault at Auvere railway station was stopped by the 502nd Heavy Tank Battalion. Fierce fighting continued for another week, when Soviet forces had suffered many casualties and switched over to the defensive.

== Background ==
The defeat in the preceding Narva offensive came as an unpleasant surprise to the leadership of the Leningrad Front, blaming it on the arrival of the freshly conscripted 20th Estonian SS Volunteer Division who were motivated to resist the looming Soviet re-occupation. Since the beginning of January, the Leningrad Front had lost 227,440 troops killed, wounded, or missing, which constituted more than half of the men who participated in the Leningrad–Novgorod strategic offensive. Both sides rushed in reinforcements. The 59th Army was brought to Narva and the 8th Estonian Rifle Corps was placed under the command of the Leningrad Front. After this deployment, the Narva sector acquired the highest concentration of forces on the Eastern Front in March 1944.

=== Preceding combat ===
The newly arrived 59th Army attacked westwards from the Krivasoo bridgehead south of the city of Narva and encircled the strongpoints of the 214th Infantry Division and two Estonian Eastern Battalions. The resistance of the encircled units gave the German command enough time to move in a platoon from the SS Panzergrenadier Regiment 23 "Norge" and to stop the units of the 59th Army.

=== Design ===
The objective of the Soviet offensive was the headquarters of the XXXXIII Army Corps on the Lastekodumägi height in the Sinimäed Hills next to the highway between Narva–Tallinn, sixteen kilometres west of Narva. The defence was built up as an array of posts between the hills and the railway.

== Deployments ==
=== German ===
- 61st Infantry Division – General Günther Krappe
- Artillery Command No. 113
- Tank squadron of the 502nd Heavy Tank Battalion – Lieutenant Otto Carius

=== Soviet ===
- 6th Rifle Corps – Major General Semyon Mikulski
  - 3 divisions
- 109th Rifle Corps – Major General Ivan Alferov
  - 3 divisions
- 46th, 260th and 261st Separate Guards Heavy Tank and 1902nd Self-propelled Artillery regiments
- 3rd Breakthrough Artillery Corps – Major General N. N. Zhdanov
- 3rd Guards Tank Corps – Major General I. A. Vovchenko

== Combat activity ==
The six Soviet divisions, armoured vehicles and artillery of the 109th Rifle Corps and the newly arrived 6th Rifle Corps attacked the weakened 61st Infantry Division at the defence of Auvere station. The 162nd Grenadier Regiment was shaken by the massive preparatory artillery bombardment and air attack. The Soviet 930th Regiment broke through the thinned-out defence line of the 61st Infantry Division through to the railway, pushing towards the headquarters of the XXXXIII Army Corps. Six Soviet T-34 tanks were destroyed by the two Tiger tanks of Lieutenant Otto Carius, forcing the Soviet infantry to withdraw.

== Casualties ==
The German side claimed that on 17–22 March, their 502nd Heavy Tank Battalion destroyed 38 tanks, four self-propelled guns and 17 assault guns.

== Aftermath ==
Brigadeführer Hyazinth Graf Strachwitz von Gross-Zauche und Camminetz's kampfgruppe . The kampfgruppe destroyed the eastern tip of the Soviet bridgehead on 6 April. Strachwitz, inspired by this success, tried to eliminate the whole bridgehead, but was unable to proceed due to the spring thaw that had rendered the swamp impassable for his tanks. By the end of April, the parties had mutually exhausted their strengths. Relative calm settled on the front until late July, 1944.
