= 502nd Heavy Panzer Battalion =

German tank battalion during World War II

- Schwere Panzerabteilung 502
- Active: 1942–1945
- Country: Nazi Germany
- Allegiance: Nazi Germany
- Branch: Heer
- Type: Armoured
- Size: Battalion
- Part of: Wehrmacht
- Equipment: Tiger I, Tiger II, Hetzer
- Engagements: Eastern front, 1942–1945

Insignia
- Mammoth

The 502nd Heavy Panzer Battalion (German: Schwere Panzerabteilung 502) was a German heavy tank battalion during World War II. The battalion was the first unit to receive and field the Tiger I. It fought on the Eastern front. It was one of the most successful German heavy tank battalions, claiming the destruction of 1,400 tanks and 2,000 guns. Otto Carius, one of the best German tank aces, was a member.

== Formation ==
The 502nd Heavy Panzer Battalion was formed on 25 May 1942 at Bamberg from the 35th Panzer Training Battalion (German: Panzer-Ersatz-Abteilung 35). On 23 July Hitler ordered that the first Tiger I tanks be sent to the Leningrad Front. The 502nd became the first unit to receive Tiger Is when on 19 and 20 August 1942 four Tiger Is were sent to the unit, which only partially equipped one company (later German regulations called for a heavy tank battalion of three companies, with 45 tanks in total). On 29 August 1942 the 502nd arrived at the Leningrad Front.

== Operations ==
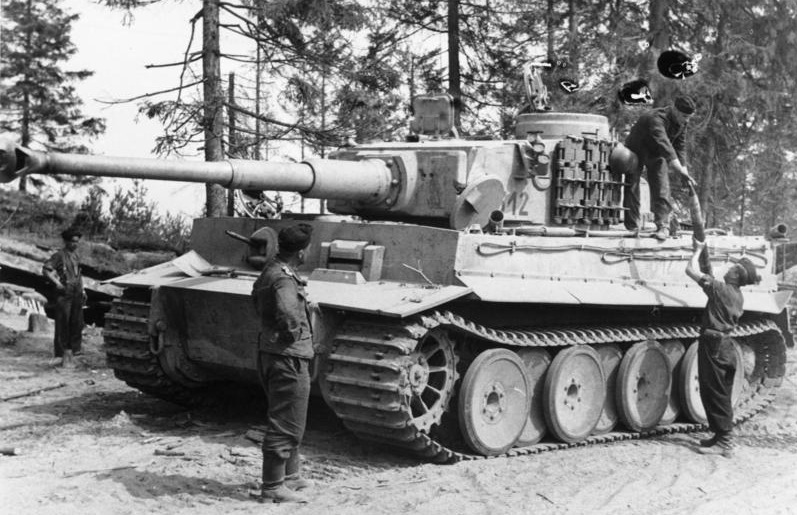
A Tiger I heavy tank of the battalion near Lake Ladoga, August 1943

The battalion took the Tiger I into combat for the first time on 16 September 1942 south of Lake Ladoga near Leningrad. On 22 September, after crossing a causeway, a Tiger became bogged down in the mud, due to enemy fire the tank could not be recovered despite a number of attempts; the tank was destroyed on 25 November to prevent its capture by the enemy. This marked the first total loss of a Tiger I. Several more Tigers and Panzer IIIs arrived on 25 September and were used to completely equip the 1st company. Several more Tiger Is were issued to the unit in February 1943 as replacements for losses.

On 14 January 1943, Soviet troops disabled and captured one of the battalion's Tiger tanks during the Operation Spark near Leningrad. Another vehicle was captured several days later. Both Tigers were quickly brought to Kubinka experimental armor facility where they were thoroughly analyzed to develop and organize strategies to counter the tank only 4 months after its first appearance on the battlefield.

On 1 April 1943, a second and third company were formed. 31 Tigers were shipped to the unit in mid to late May 1943, they brought the battalion up to full strength. In June 1943, due to a change in the organization of heavy tank battalions, the 1st company was completely outfitted with Tiger Is, rather than a mix of Tigers and Panzer IIIs.

The battalion participated in engagements on the Eastern Front during 1943 and 1944. The unit operated around Lake Ladoga from July to September 1943 and Newel, near Belarus during November and December 1943 covering the retreat of German forces from the Leningrad area. The 502nd held Narva, Estonia from February to April 1944. The 502nd fought in Pleskau in April and May 1944, then around Dunaburg, Latvia in July.

The battalion only received a few Tiger IIs. The last 13 Tiger IIs built were picked up directly at the factory by crews of the 3rd Company of the 510th and the 3rd company of the 502nd on 31 March 1945. The unit received eight Tiger IIs and took the tanks into combat on 1 April 1945.

The 502nd heavy tank battalion also served on the Western Front. By War's end, the battalion destroyed about 1400 tanks and lost 107 of their tanks from combat and non-combat circumstances such as abandoning by its crew or technical problems that was frequent to German heavy tanks. This gives them an overall kill-loss ratio of 13.08, making them the most successful heavy tank battalion of the Western Front.

== Re-designated to 511 ==
The 502nd Heavy Panzer Battalion was re-designated the 511th on 5 January 1945. Due to the lack of Tiger IIs the battalion was issued with a mix of Tiger Is, Tiger IIs, and Hetzer tank destroyers. It fought on the Eastern Front until 27 April when the battalion was disbanded. It surrendered to the Red Army on 9 May. By then the battalion had been issued 105 Tiger Is and eight Tiger IIs. It claimed the destruction of 1,400 enemy tanks, and 2,000 guns.

== See also ==
- Panzer division
- Otto Carius
