= Estonian Regiment "Reval" =

Military formation of the Waffen-SS, 1944–1945

- Active: February 1944 – 8 May 1945
- Disbanded: 8 May 1945
- Country: Nazi Germany
- Branch: Waffen SS
- Type: Infantry
- Size: Regiment
- Engagements: World War II: Battle of Narva (1944); Battle for Narva Bridgehead; Battle of Tannenberg Line

Commanders
- Notable commanders: Maj. Richard Rubach

Estonian Regiment "Reval" (German: Estnische Regiment "Reval", Estonian: Eesti Piirikaitserügement Tallinn) was an Estonian collaborationist unit loyal to Nazi Germany formed in the early spring of 1944. The regiment comprised only Estonians, and was divided into three battalions. The regiment was led by Major Richard Rubach, helped by Lt. Viktor Noorkukk. The regiment's first name was supposed to be Narwa, but that name was already used by another Estonian battalion.

The regiment's first battalion consisted mostly of Viljandi County men led by Captain Arnold Purre. The second battalion was made up of Tallinn and Tartu County men led by Captain Jüri Jürgen. The third battalion was made up of Pärnu County men led by Captain Mats Mölder.

The regiment was sent to the Narva front on February 13, 1944. The regiment was sent without adequate training or equipment (particularly machine guns) and suffered heavy losses, as there were many casualties to Soviet artillery and aircraft.

== See also ==
- 20th Waffen Grenadier Division of the SS (1st Estonian)
- Estonian Legion
