= 20th Waffen Grenadier Division of the SS (1st Estonian) =

German infantry division

- Divisional insignia
- Active: 24 January 1944 – 9 May 1945
- Country: Nazi Germany
- Branch: Waffen-SS
- Type: Infantry
- Size: Division
- Part of: III SS Panzer Corps
- Nickname: Estonian Division
- Colors: Cornflower blue, black and white
- Engagements: World War II; Eastern Front; Battle of Narva; Battle of Tannenberg Line; Tartu Offensive; Vistula-Oder Offensive; Upper Silesian Offensive

Commanders
- Notable commanders: Franz Augsberger †

The 20th Waffen Grenadier Division of the SS (1st Estonian) was a foreign infantry division of the Waffen-SS that served alongside the Wehrmacht during World War II. According to some sources, the division was under Reichsführer-SS Heinrich Himmler's overall command but was not an integral part of the Schutzstaffel (SS). It was officially activated on 24 January 1944, and many of its soldiers had been members of the Estonian Legion and/or the 3rd Estonian SS Volunteer Brigade, which had been fighting as part of German forces since August 1942 and October 1943 respectively. Both of the preceding formations drew their personnel from German-occupied Estonia. Shortly after its official activation, widespread conscription within Estonia was announced by the German occupying authorities. The division was formed in Estonia around a cadre comprising the 3rd Estonian SS Volunteer Brigade, and was initially known as the 20th Estonian SS Volunteer Division. By 1944, a total of 60,000 Estonians were fighting in the ranks of the SS and Wehrmacht.

A total of 38,000 men were conscripted in Estonia, while other Estonian units that had been part of the German Army and the Finnish Infantry Regiment 200 were transferred to Estonia. In April 1944, the division had a designated strength of 16,135 men. Between March and September 1944, it had a total of 13,700 men pass through its reserve units, and by August 1944, some 10,427 were killed or missing. The division fought the Red Army on the Eastern Front and surrendered in May 1945.

== Background ==
A secret protocol of the Molotov–Ribbentrop Pact signed on 23 August 1939 between Nazi Germany and the Soviet Union defined the spheres of influence, with Estonia assigned to the Soviet one. On 16–17 June 1940, the Soviet Union invaded and occupied Estonia. The military occupation was complete by 21 June 1940 and rendered "official" by a communist coup d'état.

Nazi Germany invaded the Soviet Union on 22 June 1941 and occupied Estonia by the end of the summer. The Germans were perceived by most Estonians as liberators from the terror of Stalinist USSR, and hopes were raised for the restoration of the country's independence. The initial enthusiasm that greeted the German invasion changed to disappointment, resentment, and in part even to enmity within a year.

Despite initial German policy not to recruit Estonians into the German Army, the commander of the German 18th Army, Generaloberst Georg von Küchler, established 26 Estonian-manned security detachments (German: Sicherungs-Abteilungen), which by August 1941 had been formed into the 181st–186th Security Battalions (German: Sicherungs-Bataillone), each of 700 men. Motivated by a desire for revenge on the Soviet Union, volunteers were plentiful, and while the original intent was for these units to serve as guards in Estonia, they were sent to the front line and acquitted themselves well. By March 1942, there were 16 Estonian battalions and companies in the Soviet Union, totalling 10,000 men. In October 1942, the existing security battalions were re-organised into "Eastern" battalions, with the 181st becoming the 658th, the 182nd becoming the 659th, one company of the 184th becoming the 657th "Eastern" Company, the rest of the 184th becoming the 660th "Eastern" Battalion, and the 186th being converted into the "Eastern" Depot Battalion "Narwa". These were retitled as "Estonian" battalions on 1 January 1943.

Also in August 1941, the German police established defence detachments (German: Schutzmannschaft-Abteilungen) in Estonia to combat partisans. In November the defence detachments were combined into defence battalions (German: Schutzmannschaft-Bataillone) or Schuma battalions, and by October 1942 there were 5,400 Estonians in 14 battalions, with another 5,100 Estonian civil police. In December 1943, the remaining 18 Schuma battalions were retitled "Estonian Police Battalions". Of these, eleven served in operational areas outside Estonia.

In the meantime, on 28 August 1942, the Germans had announced the formation of the Estonian SS Legion, as part of the Waffen-SS, an armed branch of the German Nazi Party that served alongside but was never formally part of the Wehrmacht during World War II. Its commander was SS-Obersturmbannführer Franz Augsberger. While the Estonian leadership would have preferred to reform the Estonian Army, sufficient volunteers came forward for the Legion to be officially established on 1 October at Heidelager near Dębica in occupied Poland. When created, the Legion comprised the 1st SS Volunteer Grenadier Regiment (German: 1. Estnische SS-Freiwilligen-Grenadier-Regiment), which was under the command of an Estonian, SS-Standartenführer Johannes Soodla. In January 1943, three of the best Schuma battalions were disbanded and their members joined the Legion or other Schuma battalions. In early 1943, in response to the introduction of conscription and unhappy with German policies, some Estonians fled to Finland and enlisted in the Finnish Army. Soon after, Estonians formed two companies of the 3rd Battalion of the Finnish 47th Infantry Regiment, and soon the 3rd Battalion was entirely made up of Estonians. It fought the Red Army on the Karelian Isthmus before helping form the Finnish 200th Infantry Regiment, which was made up of 310 Finns and 2,340 Estonians. The 200th Infantry Regiment continued fighting on the Isthmus until August 1944 when it was disbanded.

In April 1943, I. Battalion of the 1st SS Volunteer Regiment was retitled Volunteer Battalion Narwa (German: Freiwillige-Bataillon Narwa) and detached from the Legion. It joined the Nordic-recruited 5th SS Panzer Division Wiking, replacing a Finnish SS battalion. Volunteer Battalion Narwa distinguished itself fighting as part of the 5th SS Division until it returned to Estonia in July 1944. About the same time as the I. Battalion was detached, the Legion became operational. Continuing manpower shortages resulted in the introduction of conscription at this time, with about 12,000 men called up, of whom about 5,300 were sent to the Legion.

From spring 1943, some of the Estonian police battalions were used to form larger units, and many of their men volunteered for the Legion. The German authorities began conscripting Estonians over the winter of 1942–43. Conscripts were given a choice between serving in the Legion, auxiliary units of the German Wehrmacht or working in factories. Those who opted to serve with the Waffen-SS were offered the immediate return of their lands.

In May 1943, the Germans expanded the Legion to brigade size, initially titling it as the Estonian SS Volunteer Brigade (German: Estnische SS-Freiwillige Brigade), under the command of Augsberger. The 1st SS Volunteer Regiment became the 45th SS Volunteer Regiment, and the 53rd Artillery Battalion was formed to support the brigade. In July 1943, the 657th Estonian Company and 660th Estonian Battalion were used to help form the 46th SS Volunteer Regiment as the second regiment of the brigade. In October, the brigade was retitled the 3rd SS Volunteer Brigade. Most of the officers and non-commissioned officers of the brigade were Estonian, including the two regimental commanders, and the brigade reached a strength of 5,099 men by December. From November the brigade had been committed to fighting partisans at Nevel near Velikiye Luki in the Soviet Union, and in December it moved further north to Staraya Russa where it joined the German 16th Army. The first steps in expanding the brigade into a division also began in December. In January 1944, the brigade was sent back to Estonia to help defend against a Soviet offensive.

== Operational history ==
By January 1944, the front was pushed back by the Red Army almost all the way to the border of German-occupied Estonia. On 24 January, the 3rd SS Volunteer Brigade was expanded into the 20th Estonian SS Volunteer Division (German: 20. Waffen-Grenadier-Division der SS (estnische Nr. 1), Estonian: 20. eesti diviis), under the command of Augsberger, now an SS-Oberführer. Initially, the main fighting formations of the division were the 45th and 46th SS Volunteer Regiments, and the 20th SS Volunteer Artillery Regiment. A week later, general conscription-mobilization was announced in Estonia by the German authorities. On 7 February, the pre-war Prime minister Jüri Uluots switched his stand on mobilization when the Soviet Army reached the Estonian border. At the time the Estonian units under German control had about 14,000 men. Counting on a German debacle, Uluots considered it imperative to have large numbers of Estonians armed, through any means. Uluots even managed to tell it to the nation through the German-controlled radio: Estonian troops on Estonian soil have "a significance much wider than what I could and would be able to disclose here". This led to 38,000 men registering for the military, according to Romuald Misiunas and Rein Taagepera. Rolf-Dieter Müller states that 30,000 volunteered in addition to those conscripted, and another source states that the 20th SS Division received 15,000 volunteers, which was enough for it to reach full strength. The Estonian History Commission reported 32,000 men were conscripted after Uluots's call. After the mobilised men had made known their reluctance in being a part of the Waffen-SS and wearing the SS uniform, SS-Obersturmführer Bernhardt redefined the concept of volunteering: individuals do not matter any more and can no longer decide on volunteering; it is effectively the occupier who chooses which men, how many and for what purpose. The 20th SS Division received reinforcements, bringing the total of Estonian units up to 50,000 or 60,000 men. During the whole period at least 70,000 Estonians joined the German army, more than 10,000 may have been killed in action, about 10,000 reached the West after the war ended.

Estonian officers and men in other units that fell under the conscription proclamation and had returned to Estonia had their rank prefix changed from "SS" to "Waffen" (Hauptscharführer would be referred to as a Waffen-Hauptscharführer rather than SS-Hauptscharführer). Since the wearing of SS runes on the collar was forbidden by Augsberger on 21 April 1943, these formations wore national insignia instead.

After the Soviet Kingisepp–Gdov Offensive, the division was ordered to be replaced on the Nevel front and transported to the Narva front, to defend Estonia.

The arrival of the I.Battalion, 1st Estonian Regiment at Tartu coincided with the prepared landing operation by the left flank of the Leningrad Front to the west coast of Lake Peipus, 120 kilometres south of Narva. The I.Battalion, 1st Estonian Regiment was placed at the Yershovo Bridgehead on the east coast of Lake Peipus. Estonian and German units cleared the west coast of Peipsi of Soviets by 16 February. Soviet casualties were in thousands.

=== Battle of Narva ===
On 8 February 1944, the division was attached to SS-Obergruppenführer and General of the Waffen-SS Felix Steiner's III SS (Germanic) Panzer Corps, then defending the Narva bridgehead. The division was to replace the remnants of the 9th and 10th Luftwaffe Field Divisions, which were struggling to hold the line against a Soviet bridgehead north of the town of Narva. Upon arriving at the front on 20 February, the division was ordered to eliminate the Soviet bridgehead. In nine days of heavy fighting, the division pushed the Soviets back across the river and restored the line. The division remained stationed in the Siivertsi and Auvere sectors, being engaged in heavy combat.

In April, the 658th and 659th Estonian Battalions were transferred to the Waffen-SS to become II. and I. Battalions of the newly formed 47th SS Volunteer Grenadier Regiment respectively. The commander of the 658th Estonian Battalion, Major Alfons Rebane had been awarded the Knight's Cross of the Iron Cross in February, and was reluctant to transfer to the division. Rebane commanded the 47th SS Volunteer Grenadier Regiment, and was also Augsberger's deputy commander.

On 26 May, the division was retitled to become the 20th Waffen Grenadier Division of the SS (1st Estonian) (German: 20. Waffen-Grenadier Division der SS (Estnische Nr. 1)).

In May, the division was still 5,000 men understrength, so it was pulled out of the front line and reformed with the recently returned Narwa battalion absorbed into the division as the reconnaissance battalion. By that time, active conscription of Estonian men into the German armed forces was well under way. By Spring 1944, approximately 32,000 men were drafted into the German forces, with the 20th Waffen Grenadier Division consisting of some 15,000 men.

=== Battle of Tannenberg Line ===
In July 1944, the Volunteer Battalion Narwa returned to Estonia and was absorbed by the division. Also in July, the division reached full combat strength.

When Steiner ordered a withdrawal to the Tannenberg Line on 25 July, the division was deployed on the Lastekodumägi Hill, the first line of defence for the new position. Over the next month, the division was engaged in a heavy defensive battle in the Sinimäed hills.

On 26 July, pursuing the withdrawing defenders, the Soviet attack fell onto the Tannenberg Line. The Soviet Air Force and artillery bombarded the German positions, destroying most of the forest on the hills. On the morning of 27 July, the Soviet forces launched another powerful artillery barrage on the Sinimäed.

The heaviest Soviet attack took place on 29 July. By noon, the Red Army had almost seized control of the Tannenberg Line. The last reserve on the front, I.Battalion, 1st Estonian Regiment had been spared from the previous counterattacks. The scarcity of able-bodied men forced Sturmbannführer Paul Maitla to request reinforcements from patients in the field hospital. Twenty injured men responded, joining the remnants of other units including a part of the Kriegsmarine and supported by the single remaining Panther tank. The counterattack started from the parish cemetery south of the Tornimägi with the left flank of the assault clearing the hill of Soviet soldiers. The attack continued towards the summit under heavy Soviet artillery and bomber attack, culminating in close combat on the Soviet positions. The Estonian troops moved into the trenches. Running out of ammunition, they used Soviet grenades and automatic weapons taken from the fallen. According to some veterans, it appeared that low-flying Soviet bombers were attempting to hit every individual Estonian soldier moving between craters, some of them getting buried under soil from the explosions of Soviet shells. The Soviets were forced to retreat from the Grenaderimägi Hill.

=== Battle of Tartu ===
The 20th Waffen Grenadier Division was fully raised by August 1944, and had a strength of 13,500 men.

In mid-August, the division's 45th Estland and 46th regiments were formed into Kampfgruppe Vent and sent south to help defend the Emajõgi river line, seeing heavy fighting.

On 20 August, III. Battalion of the 46th SS Volunteer Grenadier Regiment was formed from I. Battalion of the Finnish 200th Infantry Regiment, which had recently returned to Estonia.In total, 1,800 Estonian former members of the 200th Infantry Regiment joined the division in August.

As their largest operation, supported by the 37th and 38th Estonian Police Battalions and a tank squadron commanded by Mauritz Freiherr von Strachwitz, they destroyed the bridgehead of two Soviet divisions and recaptured Kärevere Bridge by 30 August. The operation shifted the entire front back to the southern bank of the Emajõgi and encouraged the II Army Corps to launch an operation attempting to recapture Tartu. The attack of 4–6 September reached the northern outskirts of the city but was repulsed by units of the Soviet 86th, 128th, 291st and 321st Rifle Divisions. Relative calm settled on the front for the subsequent thirteen days. By September, the division totalled 15,400 men, of whom two-thirds were conscripts. Also in September, the badly-mauled 2nd Estonian Police Regiment was disbanded and its personnel were absorbed by the division. The 2nd Estonian Police Regiment had been formed in July from three veteran police battalions, and had formed part of Kampfgruppe "Jeckeln" commanded by the Higher SS and Police Leader for Northern Russia, SS-Obergruppenführer and General of Waffen-SS and Police, Friedrich Jeckeln, who was executed for war crimes after the war. On 29 October 1944, the 287th Estonian Police Battalion was absorbed by the division. The 287th Estonian Police Battalion had been formed in April 1943 from men who had deserted from the Estonian-recruited Red Army 249th Rifle Division the previous month.

=== Final battles ===
Sources differ on what happened next. According to Müller, when the German military retreated from Estonia, Estonian volunteers in the Waffen-SS were forced to remain with their units. The author Samuel Mitcham states that all troops wishing to remain in Estonia were released from German service. The author Chris Bishop states that in September 1944, many Estonian troops were released from German service, and the remaining troops were evacuated from Estonia to the Neuhammer training grounds, where the formation was reconstructed from October onwards. In December 1944, the 37th and 38th Estonian Police Battalions were absorbed by the division. The 20th Waffen Grenadier Division was almost destroyed during fighting in late 1944 or early 1945.

Eventually, the reformed division, which numbered roughly 11,000 Estonians and 2,500 Germans, returned to the front line in late February, just in time for the Soviet Vistula-Oder Offensive. This offensive forced the German forces back behind the Oder and Neisse rivers. The division was pushed back to the Neisse, taking heavy casualties. The division was then trapped with the XI. Armeekorps in the Oberglogau – Falkenberg/Niemodlin area in Silesia. By February, the division was so depleted that it was referred to as a SS-kampfgruppe, not as a division. On 17 March 1945, the kampfgruppe launched a major escape attempt, which despite making headway, failed. On 19 March, it tried again, this time succeeding, but leaving all heavy weapons and equipment behind in the pocket.

In April, the remnants of the division were moved south to the area around Goldberg. After the Prague Offensive, the division attempted to break out to the west, in order to surrender to the western Allies. The Czech partisans resumed their hostilities on the surrendered Estonian troops regardless of their intentions. In what veterans of the Estonian Division who had laid their weapons down in May 1945 recall as the Czech Hell, the partisans chased, tortured and humiliated the Waffen SS men and murdered more than 500 Estonian POWs. Some of the Estonians who had reached the Western Allies were handed back to the Soviets.

== Post-war ==
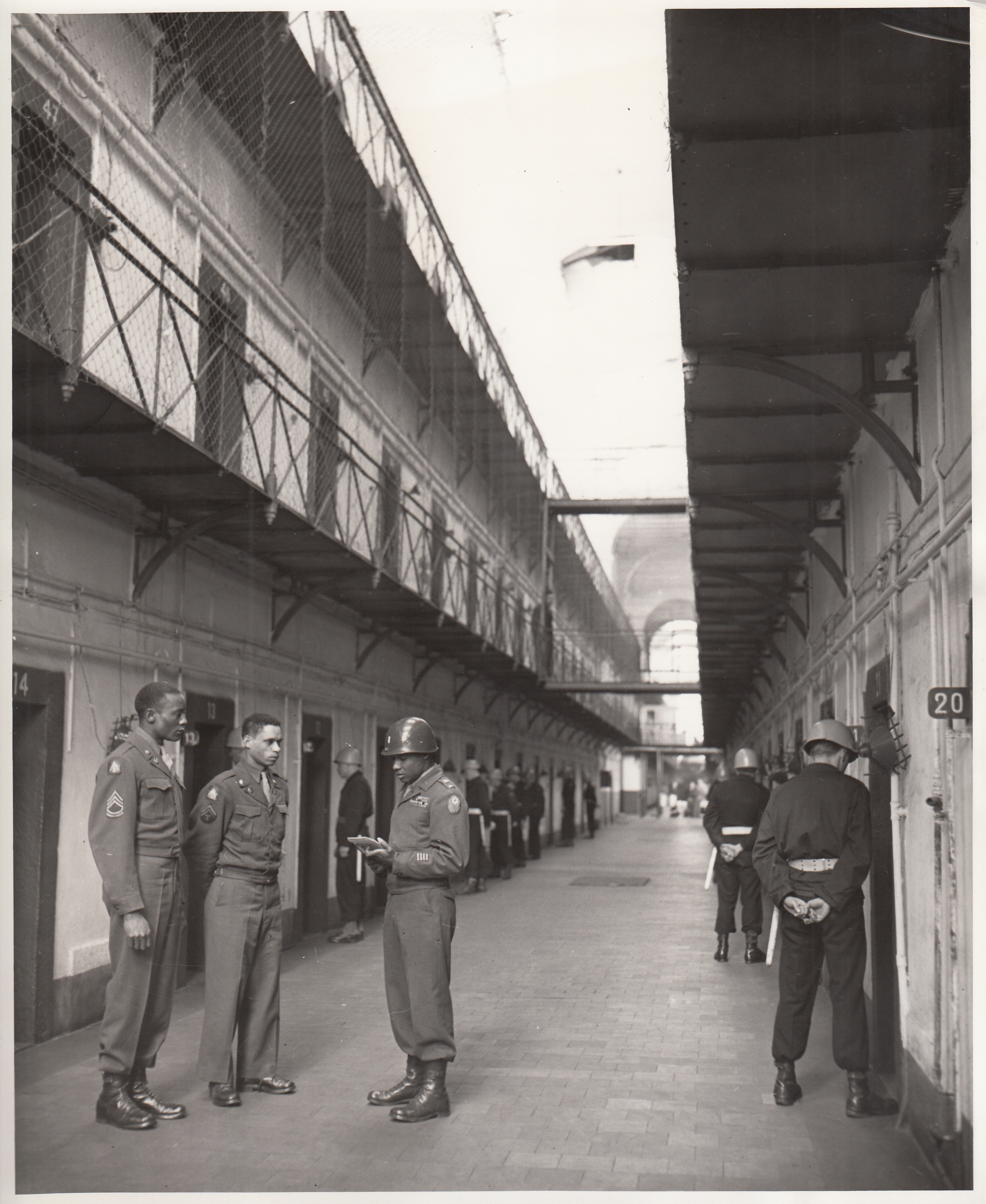
Former legionnaires, wearing black uniforms with blue helmets and white belts, guarding top Nazis during the Nuremberg Trials.

Insignia of Estonian Guard Company 4221.

In the spring of 1946, out of the ranks of those who had surrendered to the Western allies in the previous year, a total of nine companies were formed. One of these units, the 4221st Guard Company, formed from some 300 men on 26 December 1946, guarded the external perimeter of the Nuremberg International Tribunal courthouse and the various depots and residences of US officers and prosecutors connected with the trial. The men also guarded the accused Nazi war criminals held in prison during the trial, up until the day of execution.

The Nuremberg Trials, in declaring the Waffen-SS a criminal organization, explicitly excluded conscripts in the following terms:

Tribunal declares to be criminal within the meaning of the Charter the group composed of those persons who had been officially accepted as members of the SS as enumerated in the preceding paragraph who became or remained members of the organization with knowledge that it was being used for the commission of acts declared criminal by Article 6 of the Charter or who were personally implicated as members of the organization in the commission of such crimes, excluding, however, those who were drafted into membership by the State in such a way as to give them no choice in the matter, and who had committed no such crimes.

The Nuremberg tribunal ruled that the 30,000 Estonians who had served in the Baltic Legions were conscripts, not volunteers, and defined them as freedom fighters protecting their homelands from a Soviet occupation and as such they were not true members of the criminal Waffen SS.

Subsequently, on 13 April 1950, a message from the Allied High Commission (HICOG), signed by John J. McCloy to the Secretary of State, clarified the US position on the Baltic Legions: "they were not to be seen as 'movements', 'volunteer', or 'SS'. In short, they had not been given the training, indoctrination, and induction normally given to SS members".

The US Displaced Persons Commission declared in September 1950 that: "The Baltic Waffen SS Units (Baltic Legions) are to be considered as separate and distinct in purpose, ideology, activities, and qualifications for membership from the German SS, and therefore the Commission holds them not to be a movement hostile to the government of the United States."

== Commemoration and controversy ==
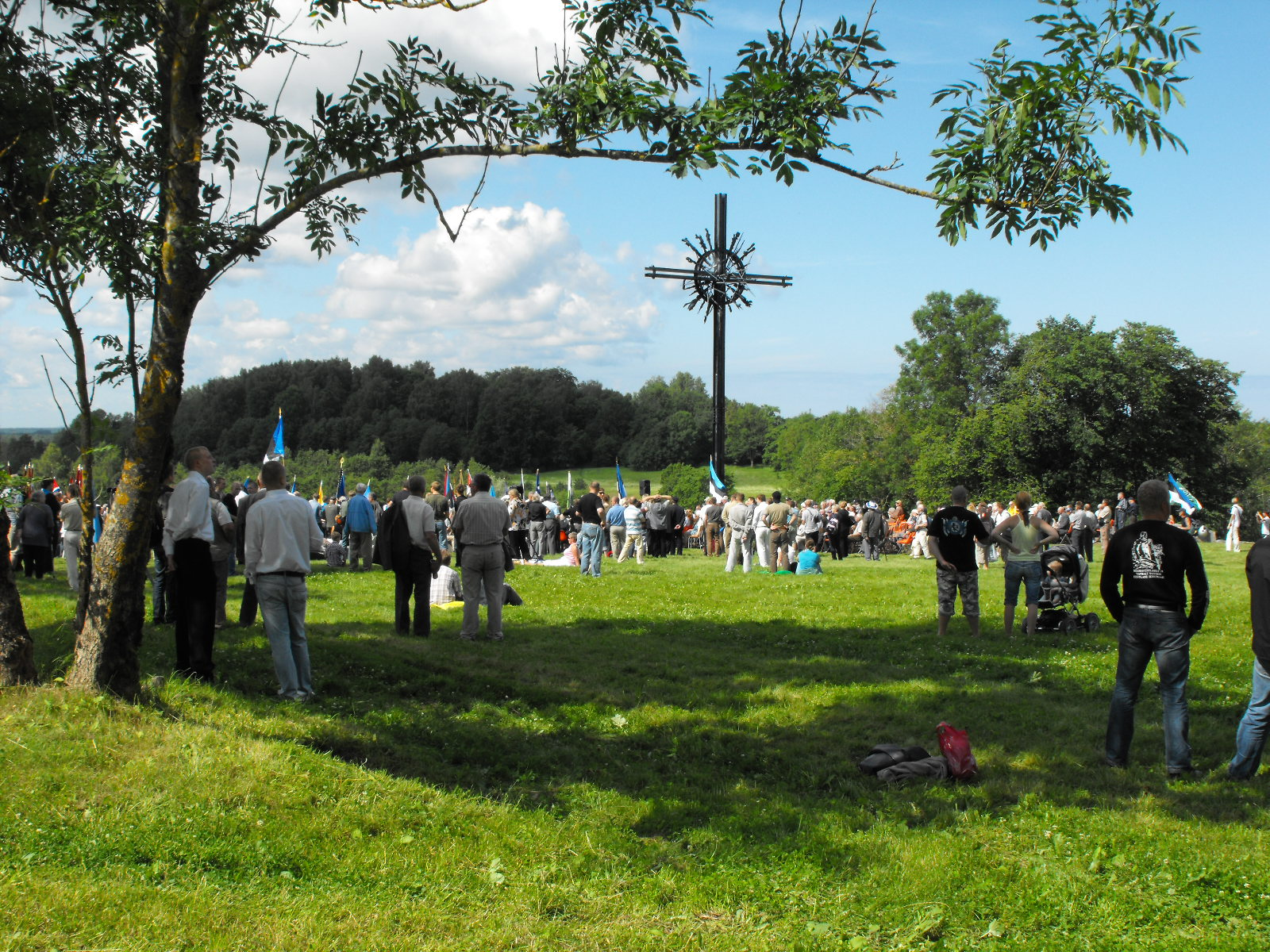
65th anniversary of the Battle of Tannenberg Line, 2009

Most living veterans of the division belong to the 20th Estonian Waffen Grenadier Division Veterans Union (Estonian: 20. Eesti Relvagrenaderide Diviisi Veteranide Ühendus). It was founded in 2000 and gatherings of veterans of the division are organised by the union on the anniversaries of the battle of the Tannenberg Line in the Sinimäed Hills. Since 2008, the chairman of the union is Heino Kerde, a former member of the 45th Regiment.

In 2002, the Estonian government forced the removal of a monument to Estonian soldiers erected in the Estonian city of Pärnu. The inscription To Estonian men who fought in 1940–1945 against Bolshevism and for the restoration of Estonian independence was the cause of the controversy. The monument was rededicated in Lihula in 2004 but was soon removed because the Estonian government opposed the opening. On 15 October 2005 the monument was finally moved to the grounds of the Museum of Fight for Estonia's Freedom in Lagedi near the Estonian capital, Tallinn.

On 28 July 2007, a gathering of some 300 veterans of the 20th Waffen-Grenadier-Division and of other units of the Wehrmacht, including a few Waffen SS veterans from Austria and Norway, took place in Sinimäe, where the battle between the German and Soviet armies had been particularly fierce. A gathering takes place every year that has seen veterans attending from Estonia, Norway, Denmark, Austria and Germany.

== Order of battle ==
The following units made of the division:

- 45th SS Volunteer Grenadier Regiment
- 46th SS Volunteer Grenadier Regiment
- 47th SS Volunteer Grenadier Regiment
- 20th SS Volunteer Artillery Regiment
- 20th SS Fusilier Battalion
- 20th SS Panzerjäger (Anti-tank) Company
- 20th SS Engineer Battalion
- 20th SS Anti-aircraft Battalion
- 20th SS Signals Battalion
- 20th SS Divisional Supply Troops

Each grenadier regiment consisted of three battalions, and the artillery regiment consisted of four battalions—three equipped with 10.5 cm leFH 18 howitzers and one with 15 cm sFH 18 heavy howitzers.

== Commanders and notable members ==
Commanders

The following officers commanded the division:

- SS-Oberführer (SS-Brigadeführer from 21 June 1944) Franz Augsberger (24 January 1944 – 19 March 1945)
- SS-Sturmbannführer Hans-Joachim Muetzelfeldt (19 March 1945)
- SS-Oberführer (SS-Brigadeführer from 20 April 1945) Berthold Maack (19 March 1945 – 8 May 1945)

Notable members

- Wilhelm Schäfer, German officer and former concentration camp official who was responsible for executing hundreds of prisoners
- Rudolf Bruus, Estonian commander 2nd Battalion of the 43rd SS Volunteer Regiment, later the commander of the 46th SS Volunteer Grenadier Regiment
- Paul Maitla, Estonian officer and Knight's Cross recipient
- Alfons Rebane, Estonian officer and Knight's Cross with Oakleaves recipient
- Harald Riipalu, Estonian officer and Knight's Cross recipient
- Harald Nugiseks, Estonian officer and Knight's Cross recipient
- Kalju Lepik, Estonian poet
- Kaljo Kiisk, Estonian film director
- Friedrich Kurg, Estonian commander of the 2nd Battalion of the 46th Regiment
- Johannes Soodla, Estonian Brigadeführer
- Arved Viirlaid (formerly in Finnish Regiment 200), Estonian writer

== See also ==
- Estonian Regiment "Reval"
- Estonian Legion
- List of Waffen-SS units
- Ranks and insignia of the Waffen-SS
- Waffen-SS foreign volunteers and conscripts
