= Paul Maitla =

Estonian Waffen-SS officer

- Paul Maitla in 1944
- Born: March 27, 1913; Kärkna, Kreis Dorpat, Governorate of Livonia, Russian Empire
- Died: May 10, 1945 (aged 32); Nymburk, Czechoslovakia
- Cause of death: Execution by firing squad
- Military career
- Allegiance: Estonia; Soviet Union; Nazi Germany
- Branch: Estonian Army; Red Army; German Army; Waffen-SS
- Service years: 1938–1945
- Rank: SS-Sturmbannführer
- Nickname: "Kugelblitz" ("Ball Lightning")
- Units: 3rd Infantry battalion, Estonian Army; Estonian state defense instructor; 171st Infantry Battalion, Red Army; 37th Police Battalion, Wehrmacht; Estonian Legion; 20th Waffen Grenadier Division of the SS (1st Estonian)
- Conflicts: World War II; Battle of Narva; Battle for Narva Bridgehead; Battle of Tannenberg Line; Battle of Oppeln
- Awards: Knight's Cross of the Iron Cross

Paul Maitla (born Paul Mathiesen; March 27, 1913 – May 10, 1945) was an Estonian commander in the German Waffen-SS during World War II. He is one of the four Estonians who received the Knight's Cross of the Iron Cross of Nazi Germany. He received his award for his actions during the Battle of Tannenberg Line.

== Early life ==
Paul was the youngest of three children of the family. His brother died in the Estonian War of Independence, eight years older sister had died in Estonia a few years after World War II. Paul Maitla attended elementary school in Sipe from 1921, Tartu Kommertsgümnaasium from 1927, graduating from the Poeglaste secondary school in 1934. After graduation he changed his name to Maitla.

In September 1934 Maitla entered the Estonian Military School and specialised in pioneering. Maitla then entered officer training in 1937, graduating in August 1938. He was then assigned to the 3rd Infantry battalion in Valga. On Independence Day, 1939, he was commissioned by the President of Estonia to the rank of lieutenant. During 1939 and 1940 he was the State defence instructor in the secondary schools of Tartu.

== World War II ==
After the Soviet occupation of Estonia in 1940, Maitla was drafted into the Red Army, where he served until he was captured by the Germans in July 1941. Maitla was then interned by the Germans until November 1941, when he was released and joined the 37th Police Battalion, and tasked with guarding German airfields.

In the autumn of 1942, Maitla was promoted to lieutenant. In October, he joined the Estonian Legion. He and 113 men were sent to Poland for training. From there, he was sent to Bad Tölz for additional officer training. Maitla returned from training in 1943 and was promoted to commander of the 3rd Company of the 1st Battalion of the 45th Regiment. In April 1943, the Estonian Waffen SS brigade participated in the battles in Nevel, and he received the Iron Cross II class on 8 December for bravery.

Maitla was appointed a Hauptsturmführer (captain) and in April 1944 he was commander of the 1st Battalion of the 45th Regiment of the newly formed 20th Waffen Grenadier Division of the SS (1st Estonian). In the same year, Maitla with his battalion took part in the Battle of Auvere and received the Iron Cross I class. On 29 July, he and his battalion took part in the Battle of Tannenberg Line for which he was awarded the Knights Cross on 23 August.

In August, Maitla was assigned to Battle Group Vent, but fell ill again shortly afterwards and admitted into Tartu Hospital. He was then moved to a hospital in Bregenz, Germany until January 1945. Maitla then rejoined the 45th regiment, which had by this time been relocated to central Europe. On April 20, 1945, he was promoted to Sturmbannführer (major).

The fate of Paul Maitla was uncertain for number of decades, until some information was discovered in 2005 in the city archives of the Czech town of Nymburk. These archives show that Maitla was arrested on May 9, 1945, and tried and executed together with 4 other Estonian soldiers after the war on May 10 by Czech communists.

== Quote ==
Every little kid learns history at school, studying the history of our nation, but later forgets, how the entire history of Estonians consists only of the struggle for our existence, the struggle against our strong and big neighbors. No other nation's history is like this, no one has fought over so many generations and suffered so much as we, Estonians. When Pearu of Vargamäe says in A. H. Tammsaare's Truth and Justice, that there is a heroic kind of people at Vargamäe, it's actually said about all Estonians, a heroic kind of people on the shore of the Baltic Sea. We shall fight until we have our lost liberty back and we shall defend it to the last man. These are the Estonians!

— Paul Maitla in his diary at February 26, 1943.

== Awards ==
- Iron Cross 2nd & 1st class
- Knight's Cross of the Iron Cross on 23 August 1944 as Waffen-Hauptsturmführer and leader of the I./Waffen-Grenadier-Regiment 45 of the SS (estn. Nr. 1) (Note: According to Scherzer as leader of the I./Waffen-Grenadier-Regiment of the SS 45 (estn. Nr. 1).)

== See also ==
- Sinimäed, a documentary film based upon Paul Maitla's war diaries.
