= Vaivara Landscape Conservation Area =

Protected area in Estonia

- Location within Estonia
- Location: Estonia
- Coordinates: 59°19′20″N 27°44′10″E; 59°22′30″N 27°51′00″E
- Area: 86 ha (210 acres)

Vaivara Landscape Conservation Area is a nature park situated in Ida-Viru County, Estonia.

Its area is 86 ha.

The protected area was designated in 1959 to protect Sinimäed Hills. In 2018, the protected area was redesigned to the landscape conservation area.

== See also ==
- Sinimäed Hills
- Battle of Tannenberg Line
