= Fritz von Scholz =

Waffen-SS member (1896–1944)

- Scholz in 1944
- Born: 9 December 1896; Plzeň, Austria-Hungary
- Died: 28 July 1944 (aged 47); Narva, Reichskommissariat Ostland
- Military career
- Allegiance: Austria-Hungary; Austria; Nazi Germany
- Branch: Austro-Hungarian Army; Waffen-SS
- Service years: 1914–1919, 1933–1944
- Rank: SS-Gruppenführer and Generalleutnant of the Waffen-SS
- Service number: NSDAP #1,304,071; SS #135,638
- Commands: 1 SS Infantry Brigade; SS Division Nordland
- Conflicts: World War I; World War II; Battle of Tannenberg Line †
- Awards: Knight's Cross of the Iron Cross with Oak Leaves and Swords

Fritz von Scholz (9 December 1896 – 28 July 1944) was a high-ranking member of the Nazi Waffen-SS during World War II and a recipient of the Knight's Cross of the Iron Cross with Oak Leaves and Swords of Nazi Germany.

== Nazi military career ==
Born in 1896, Fritz von Scholz served in World War I with the Austro-Hungarian Army in 1914. Discharged from the army in 1919, Scholz was a member of the paramilitary Freikorps since 1921. He joined the Austrian branch of the Nazi Party (NSDAP) in 1932 (Nr. 1304071), and then the Austrian SA. Following his involvement in street violence, Scholz fled to Nazi Germany in late 1933 to avoid arrest. He joined the SS on 10 June 1933 (Nr. 135638), serving with the Austrian SS Legion.

Scholtz started World War II as a battalion commander in the SS-Regiment Der Führer, taking part in the Western campaign of 1940 and later taking command of the SS Regiment Nordland, which in 1941 became part of a new SS Division Wiking. Attached to Army Group South, the division took Tarnopol in Galicia in late June, 1941. In early 1943, he took command of the 1st SS Infantry Brigade, attached to Army Group Centre, then 2nd SS Infantry Brigade composed of mostly Latvian recruits, under Army Group North. On 20 April, Scholz was appointed commander of a new SS Division Nordland. The division was soon moved to Croatia where it saw action against Yugoslav partisans.

In January 1944, the division was transferred to the Oranienbaum front near Leningrad and attached to the III SS Panzer Corps under Army Group North. The division retreated to Narva and participated in the battles for the Narva bridgehead.

Scholz was awarded the Oakleaves to the Knight's Cross on 12 March 1944. In late July, after the launch of the Soviet Narva Offensive, the Corps retreated from the city of Narva and the Narva river in general, to the Tannenberg defences at the Sinimäed Hills. On 27 July 1944, Scholz was wounded in an artillery barrage and died the next day. He was posthumously awarded the Swords to the Knight's Cross on 8 August 1944.

== Awards ==
- Iron Cross 2nd Class (17 May 1940) & 1st Class
- German Cross in Gold on 22 November 1941 as SS-Standartenführer in SS-Regiment "Nordland"
- Knight's Cross of the Iron Cross with Oak Leaves and Swords
  - Knight's Cross on 18 January 1942 as SS-Oberführer and commander of SS-Regiment "Nordland"
  - 423rd Oak Leaves on 12 March 1944 as SS-Brigadeführer of the Waffen-SS and commander of the 11. SS-Freiwilligen-Panzergrenadier-Division "Nordland"
  - 85th Swords on 8 August 1944 (posthumously) as SS-Gruppenführer of the Waffen-SS and commander of the 11. SS-Panzergrenadier-Division "Nordland"

== See also ==
- List SS-Gruppenführer

Military offices
Preceded by SS-Brigadeführer Franz Augsberger	Commander of 11. SS-Freiwilligen-Panzergrenadier-Division "Nordland"; 1 May 1943–27 July 1944	Succeeded by SS-Brigadeführer Joachim Ziegler
