= Battle for Narva Bridgehead =

1944 military conflict in Estonia during WW II

Battle for the Narva Bridgehead
- Part of World War II
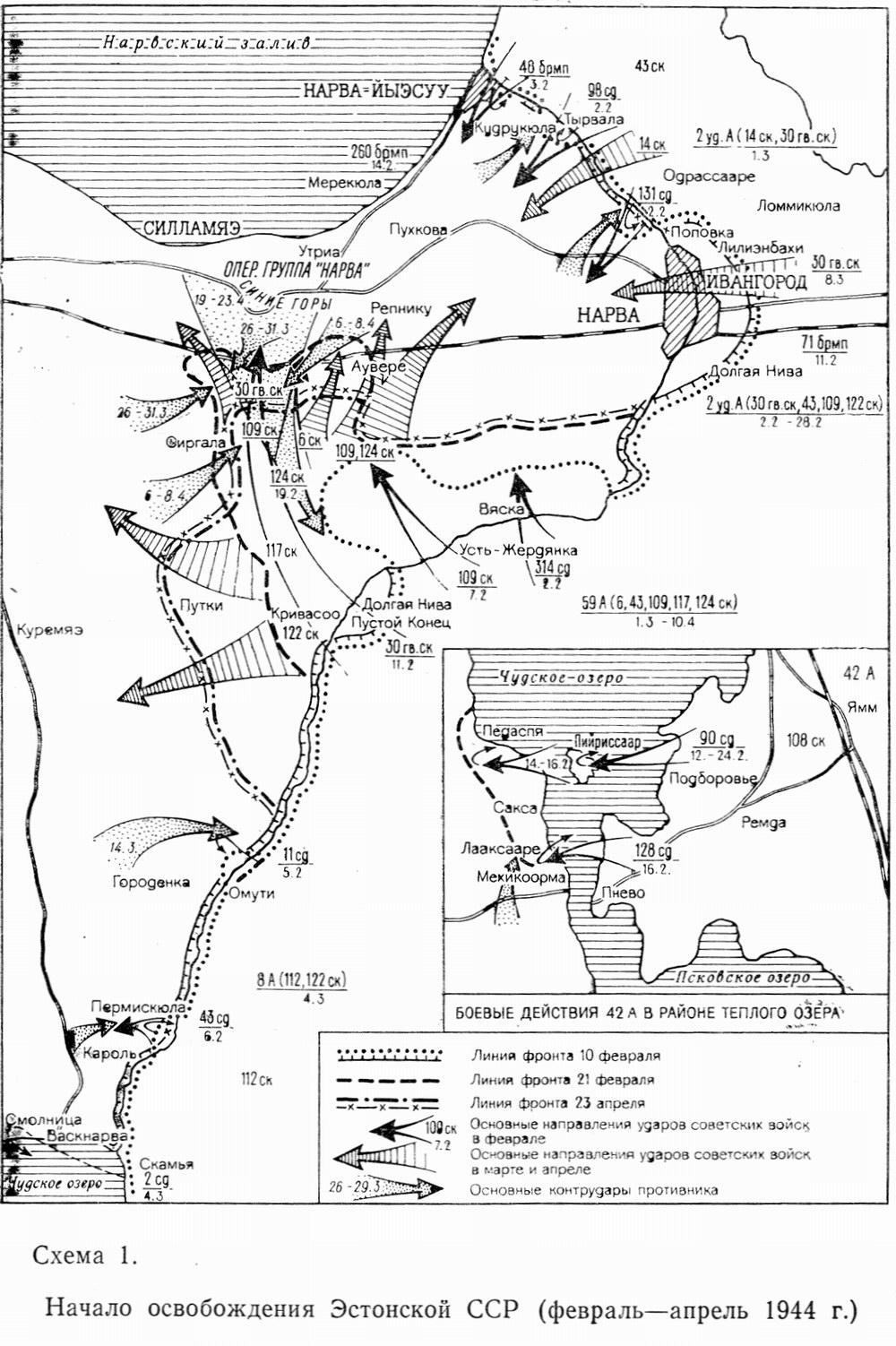
- Soviet plan of the attempted break-out, February – April 1944
Date	2 February – 26 July 1944
Location	Narva, Estonia 59°23′N 28°12′E
Result	German withdrawal

Belligerents
Germany	Soviet Union

Commanders and leaders
(Nazi Germany) Johannes Frießner	(Soviet Union) Leonid A. Govorov

Strength
123,541 personnel 32 tanks 137 aircraft	205,000 personnel 2,500 assault guns 100 tanks 800 aircraft

Casualties and losses
Contemporary estimates: 12,000 dead, missing or captured 46,000 wounded or sick	Contemporary indirect estimates: 65,000 dead or missing 235,000 wounded or sick 130 armoured vehicles 230 aircraft

The Battle of Narva Bridgehead (Estonian: Narva lahingud, German: Schlacht um den Brückenkopf von Narva, Russian: Битва за плацдарм Нарва; 2 February – 26 July 1944) was the campaign that stalled the Soviet Estonian operation in the surroundings of the town of Narva for six months. It was the first phase of the Battle of Narva campaign fought at the Eastern Front during World War II, the second phase being the Battle of Tannenberg Line.

A number of volunteer Waffen SS units from Norway, Denmark, the Netherlands and Belgium fought on the German side. Several Western authors dealing with the foreign national units nickname the campaign as the "Battle of the European SS". (Note: In the context of this battle the term "Battle of the European SS" solely refers to the high proportion of foreign nationals present. The notion of a "European SS" was also a post-war myth created to falsely portray the Waffen SS as a multinational European army composed of idealists fighting to preserve western civilisation from the onslaught of 'Asiatic Bolshevism'. No such army existed, since the majority of foreign nationals were in fact east Europeans conscripted mostly in 1944 who were more motivated in saving their own countries from Soviet domination in a situation where Germany was clearly losing the war, rather than for any alleged pan-European ideal.Christopher Ailsby, Hitler's Renegades: Foreign Nationals in the Service of the Third Reich, Brassey's 2004, ISBN 1-57488-838-2, page 145 and Tim Ripley, The Waffen-SS at War: Hitler's Praetorians 1925–1945, Zenith Imprint 2004, ISBN 0-7603-2068-3, page 189) The Estonian conscripts fought to defend their country against the looming Soviet reoccupation.

The Soviet Estonian offensive was a follow-on of the Leningrad–Novgorod offensive. Its aim was to reconquer Estonia, which was annexed by the Soviet Union in 1940. Although Narva was not the main direction of the Soviet offensives on the Eastern Front in 1944, the Baltic Sea seemed the quickest way to Joseph Stalin for taking the battles to the German ground and seizing control of Finland.

The Soviet Estonian offensive stalled after securing several bridgeheads over the Narva River and facing the Nazi German Wotan Line. The fierce fighting starting in February stopped at the end of April. With the Narva offensive, 24–30 July 1944, the Red Army captured the town of Narva, as the German troops retreated 16 kilometres to the southwest to continue fighting at their prepared positions. The German forces managed to block the Soviet advance to the Baltic ports for nearly six months due to the nature of the terrain and the resistance of the international troops.

== Background ==
Breaking through the Narva isthmus situated between the Gulf of Finland and Lake Peipus was of major strategic importance to the Soviet Armed Forces. The success of the Estonian operation would have provided unobstructed advance along the coast to Tallinn, forcing Army Group North to escape from Estonia for fear of being besieged. For the Baltic Fleet trapped in an eastern bay of the Gulf of Finland, Tallinn was the closest exit to the Baltic Sea. The ejection of Army Group North from Estonia would have made southern Finland subject to air and amphibious attacks originating from Estonian bases.

The retreat of Army Group North from the surroundings of Leningrad made the commanders of Finland realise that soon it may be too late to start negotiations with the Soviet Union. On 31 January 1944, General Field Marshal Keitel sent a letter to the Finnish Commander-in-Chief Mannerheim, claiming that the retreat of Army Group North to the Panther Line constituted no danger whatsoever to Finland. Marshal Mannerheim did not share the optimism, expressing his concern that the road in Narva would be open not only to Estonia, but also to Finland. As the German condition worsened in the Narva front, President of Finland Juho Kusti Paasikivi was presented with Stalin's peace terms on 8 February. However, Finland stayed in the war. To separate Finland from Germany and make her defence hopeless, Stalin needed to conquer Estonia. Stalin hoped that a breakthrough at Narva would make Finland sign a peace treaty quickly. The perspective of an invasion to East Prussia through Estonia appealed even more to the Soviet Main Command, as it appeared bringing German resistance to a collapse. Stalin gave a short and clear order to the Leningrad Front on 14 February:

It is mandatory that our forces seize Narva no later than 17 February 1944. This is required both for military as well as political reasons. It is the most important thing right now. I demand that you undertake all necessary measures to liberate Narva no later than the period indicated. (signed) J. Stalin

With the tactical success of Army Group Narwa in late February, March and April, Finland terminated the negotiations with the Soviet Union on 18 April.

=== Battlefield terrain ===
The town of Narva is situated along the river of the same name. The river stretches from Lake Peipus northward to the Gulf of Finland. (Note: In the 1950s a large artificial reservoir was created south of Narva, flooding part of the former Krivasoo bridgehead.) The corridor of land from Lake Peipus to the coast is about forty five kilometres wide, creating a natural choke-point for military operations. The terrain is predominately low-lying with the highest areas being around 100 meters in elevation. Much of the land is swamp and cut by numerous waterways, with other areas heavily forested. This combination of aspects meant the land was by and large well-suited for defence as the waterways, swamps, and forests tend to channelise an attacker's movements.

== Formation of bridgeheads ==
On 14 January 1944, the Soviet Volkhov and Leningrad Fronts launched operations aimed at forcing the German field marshal Georg von Küchler's Army Group North back from its positions near Oranienbaum. On the third day of the offensive, the Soviets broke through German lines and pushed westward. The 109th Rifle Corps had captured Kingisepp by 1 February. Obergruppenführer Felix Steiner's III (Germanic) SS Panzer Corps fought a rearguard action until it reached the eastern bank of the Narva. Army Group Sponheimer blew up the ice on the southern 50 kilometre section of the Narva river from Lake Peipus to Krivasoo swamp. North of the town, the 4th Soviet Rifle Regiment reached the Narva river, establishing a small bridgehead across it on 2 February 1944. The fighting to the east of Narva had left a large number of German troops stranded on the wrong side of the front. Simultaneously, the 122nd Rifle Corps crossed the river south of the town in Vääska settlement, establishing a bridgehead in the Krivasoo swamp 10 kilometres south of Narva town.

=== Ivangorod bridgehead ===
The main brunt of the Soviet attack was where the Germans had least expected it – the III SS Panzer Corps, positioned east of the strategically important town of Narva and holding the German bridgehead on the opposite bank. The Corps were mostly made up of SS volunteer formations. The Dutchmen of the 4th SS Volunteer Panzergrenadier Brigade Nederland and the various nationalities of the 11th SS Volunteer Panzergrenadier Division Nordland began frantically digging in along what had become known as the Narva line. The defensive line ran for eleven kilometres, from the estate of Lilienbach two kilometres north-east from the highway bridge over Narva river, to the settlement of Dolgaya Niva three kilometres in the south, bulging eastwards from the river. The 4th SS Panzergrenadier Brigade Nederland defended the northern half of the bridgehead while the 11th SS Division Nordland held the southern flank. Attacking them along the highway and railway were the four Soviet divisions of the 43rd and the 109th Rifle Corps. The Nederland Brigade, the 1st battalion of the SS Volunteer Panzergrenadier Regiment 24 Danmark, and the German artillery inflicted heavy casualties on the Red Army, who failed to reach their operational goal of destroying the bridgehead.

=== Krivasoo bridgehead in first half of February ===
In the Krivasoo swamp ten kilometres south of Narva, the Soviet 1078th Regiment and the ski battalion of the 314th Rifle Division crossed the river under a heavy German air and artillery attack in four hours. Despite the resistance of the 29th Estonian Police Battalion, the 314th Rifle Division approached the Auvere Railway Station 10 kilometres west of Narva, threatening to cut the railway behind the III SS Panzer Corps and the two division-sized units of Army Group Narwa. The Soviet author Fyodor Paulman depicts the battles for Auvere station as ferocious, causing serious casualties to the 314th Rifle Division. Two regiments of the 125th Rifle Division were sent to assist them. The renewed Soviet units captured the railway crossing near Auvere station on 6 February, losing it on the same day under the fire of the German coastal artillery. From then on, the Soviet forces remained passive in the direction of Auvere, giving Army Group Narwa valuable time to regain their strength.

=== Omuti, Permisküla and Gorodenka bridgeheads in the south ===
Two Soviet platoons of the 147th Rifle Regiment volunteered to cross the river to the settlements of Omuti, Permisküla and Gorodenka forty kilometres south of Narva on 2 February. The bank was defended by the 30th Estonian Police Battalion. The defence was built as an array of small bridgeheads on the east bank, appearing to the Soviets as a carefully prepared defence system in front of the main defence line. Repelled for the first time, the Soviet headquarters took some hours to prepare the attack by the 219th and 320th Rifle Regiments. The Estonians pulled back to their bank during the Soviet attacks, stopping the advance of the Red Army and causing heavy losses. Despite the heroics of the Soviet commanders, only a small platoon commanded by Lieutenant Morozov fortified themselves on the west bank.

== Soviet difficulties in February ==
The Soviet operations were accompanied by major problems in supply, as the major transport connections had been largely destroyed by the Germans and the remaining poor roads were threatening to fall apart in the thaw closing in. Another failure was in intelligence, as all Soviet partisan troops that had been sent to Estonia were destroyed. In their report on 8 February, the War Council of the Leningrad Front saw the preparations for the landings across the Narva river as unsatisfactory:

The reconnaissance is unorganized in the army; in the corps and the divisions, there is a lack of a concrete decision on the order of battle and the line-out of batteries; entirely unsolved is the matter of the tanks crossing the river and conducting combat on the left bank; there are no schemes prepared of the engineering support for the attacks. The army (...) lacks an anti-air defence plan; (...)

The 98th and the 131st Soviet Armoured Divisions established a bridgehead on the west bank near the settlement of Siivertsi further north from Narva on 12 February. The bridgehead soon became the most critical position on the whole Narva front. If the Soviets succeeded there, Narva city would fall quickly and the Narva bridgehead on the east bank of the river would be cut off. All available units were thrown against Siivertsi bridgehead.

=== First attack of Soviet main forces ===
Until the second week of February, the two armies of the Leningrad Front had deployed only vanguard elements. Army General Leonid A. Govorov of Leningrad Front ordered the 2nd Shock Army to break through the German defence line north and south of Narva town, move the front fifty kilometres westwards and continue towards the town of Rakvere. The artillery of the 2nd Shock army opened fire on all German positions on 11 February. The 30th Guards Rifle Corps, an elite unit usually used in breaching defence lines, joined the Soviet units attempting to seize the Auvere station. The guards riflemen widened the bridgehead to ten kilometres along the front. The remains of the German 227th and 170th Divisions retreated. General Major Romancov ordered an assault at Auvere settlement by the Air Force and artillery on 13 February, with the 64th Guard Rifle Division seizing the village in a surprise attack.
Half a kilometre westward from Auvere station, the 191st Guard Rifle Regiment cut through the railway two kilometres from the Tallinn highway, which was the last way out for Army Group Narwa, but was repelled by the 170th Infantry Division and the 502nd Tank Battalion.

== Soviet landing operations on 14 February ==
The situation on the Narva front was turning into a catastrophe for the Wehrmacht in mid-February. The Leningrad Front had formed two bridgeheads north and south of Tallinn highway, the closest of them a few hundred metres away from the highway. Army Group Narwa was in direct danger of getting besieged. The defense of the highway was held only by small infantry units formed of the field divisions of the Luftwaffe, supported by Panther tanks after every few hundred metres along the highway. They obscured direct observation of the highway by placing branches of spruce trees along it, however, this did not distract the Soviet artillery from keeping the highway under constant bombardment. The faith of the Army Group Narwa, that the defense could go on like this, started to diminish.

=== Meerapalu landing operation ===
Seeing the condition of the front, Hitler ordered the 20th Estonian SS-Volunteer Division to be replaced on the Nevel front and transported to the Narva front. The arrival of the Estonian Division coincided with the prepared landing operation by the left flank of the Leningrad Front to the west coast of Lake Peipus, 120 kilometres south of Narva. The Soviet 90th Rifle Division seized Piirissaar island in the middle of the lake on 12 February, with taking the Estonian city of Tartu as its goal. The Estonian Division was placed at the Yershovo bridgehead on the east coast of Lake Peipus. The 374th Soviet Rifle Regiment crossed Lake Peipus on 14 February, seized the coastal village of Meerapalu in a surprise attack, and formed a bridgehead. Additional Soviet units attacking across the lake were destroyed by 21 German Junkers Ju 87 dive bombers. On the next day, the Soviet units were expelled from the west coast by the I.Battalion, Waffen-Grenadier Regiment der SS 45 Estland and an East Prussian battalion of the 44th Grenadier Regiment. Estonian sources estimate the Soviet casualties to be in the thousands. A battalion of the 44th Grenadier Regiment regained Piirissaar island on 17 February.

=== Mereküla landing operation ===
To break the last resistance, simultaneously with preparing the Meerapalu landing operation, Govorov ordered the 260th Independent Naval Infantry Brigade to prepare for an amphibious attack to the German rear in Narva. This was an elite unit, specially trained for an amphibious assault. They were transported to the Narva front by a naval unit with 26 vessels. The troops were to assault from the Gulf of Finland, landing several miles behind the German lines near the coastal settlement of Mereküla. The first company were to destroy the railway and Auvere station, the second company to occupy the railway east from Auvere, and the third company to cover the left flank and to blow up the railway bridge east of Auvere. Estonian sources claim that as the instructions for later action, Major Maslov ordered the slaughter of civilians. Another amphibious unit was intended to land after them. However, Estonian counterintelligence had acquired data on an amphibious operation being prepared to land in Mereküla in 1939. Preparing the Panther Line in 1944, the Germans placed their artillery on the coastal battery built by the Military of Estonia specifically against such a landing. The 517 troops commenced their operation on 14 February, landing directly in front of the German coastal artillery. The Norge Regiment and the coastal guards, supported by three Tiger tanks quickly responded. While the 2nd Shock Army artillery placed near Auvere failed to begin their attack at the agreed time, in seven and a half hours of fierce fighting, the Soviet beachhead was annihilated.

== Narva offensive, 15–28 February ==
General Ivan Fedyuninsky took the 13th Rifle Division from the reserve to support the 30th Guards Rifle Corps' offensive aimed at Auvere station on 15 February. Supported by heavy gunfire, the 45th Rifle Guard Division broke through to the railway again 500 metres to the west of Auvere station, but a powerful attack by German dive bombers pinned them down. The Tallinn railway, supplying the surroundings of Narva, was cut from two places, threatening to encircle the III SS Panzer Corps in the northeast. In the course of the action, the Soviet 30th Guards Rifle Corps lost 7773 troops and ceased to exist as a combat-ready unit. Units of Army Group Narwa, supported by tanks, went on to counterattack, stopping the Soviet rifle corps' advance.

As another reserve, Fedyuninsky brought in the 124th Rifle Corps on 20 February, reinforcing it by the artillery of the destroyed divisions. Despite heavy resistance from the German 61st Infantry Division, the rifle corps mounted a powerful strike behind the railway. Frießner hurried his forces southwards against the 124th Rifle Corps advance. The German 61st Infantry Division and the German Panzer Division Feldherrnhalle 1, supported by the 502nd Heavy Tank Battalion, drove the rifle corps back to the river in a pitched battle. After the offensive, the weakened Soviet 30th Guard Rifle Corps was replaced by the 10th Rifle Corps. The 214th Division and an Estonian battalion cut a rifle division off from the rest of their forces on 28 February. The 43rd Soviet Rifle Corps restored the situation.

== Destruction of Soviet bridgeheads north of Narva ==
The Estonian Division arrived at the week following 13 February, at the height of the fighting around Narva. To strengthen the German defense in the north, the division, reinforced by newly conscripted Estonians, were attached to the III SS Panzer Corps. They were to defend the line against the 378th Rifle Division, the 340th Machine-Gun Battalion, and the 803th Zenith Artillery Regiment at the Riigiküla bridgehead seven kilometres to the north of Narva town. Steiner threw the division into battle on 20 February. The Soviet units with ample experience from the Siege of Leningrad had a significant number of women within their ranks. Retreat was forbidden under the penalty of death. As this was the main Soviet direction of attack for the moment, the Estonians frantically fortified the line with mine fields, barbed wire, and a large number of artillery pieces across the river north of the bridgehead. The terrain was well known to some of the Estonians, as an army rifle practice field was located on the exact spot before the war.
For there first in Narva the Estonian Division had the Waffen-Grenadier Regiment der SS 45 and the Waffen-Grenadier Regiment der SS 46 separate the Riigiküla bridgehead from the Siivertsi bridgehead on 21 February. The failure of their following attacks made it clear that direct attacks were impossible because of the batteries across the river. Instead, the "rolling" tactics were applied learned by the Estonian officers in the Estonian National Defence College before World War II. This meant piercing small shock platoons into the Soviet trenches which were impossible to spot by the artillery. It was considered a matter of national honour to annihilate the Soviet bridgehead by 24 February, the Estonian Independence Day. The Soviet bridgehead was reinforced with the 1078th Rifle Regiment increasing the number of the defenders to 776 with 14 assault guns. The Red Army command was convinced in the well-placed artillery fire hitting back every possible attack. The II.Battalion, Waffen-Grenadier Regiment der SS 46 led by Hauptsturmführer Rudolf Bruus and the German artillery appeared as if committing a direct assault while a platoon of the 6th Company led by Rein Oskar Männik threw themselves into the Soviet trenches. At first, the Soviets resisted the assault but after running out of hand grenades, they were forced to retreat over the frozen river.

The next task was the destruction of Siivertsi–Vepsküla bridgehead four kilometres north of Narva defended by 1,100 troops of the 378th Rifle Division with 20 assault guns. The attack was commanded by Standartenführer Paul Vent. The Waffen-Grenadier Regiment der SS 45 made a direct assault at the bridgehead on 29 February. Simultaneously, the Waffen-Grenadier Regiment der SS 46 in their attempt to attack from the left flank ran into the Soviet fortifications and crossed a mine field. As the I.Battalion, Waffen-Grenadier Regiment der SS 46 lost almost all of its officers, the Unterscharführer Harald Nugiseks stepped in as the leader of the attack. He immediately changed tactics, loading the supply of hand grenade onto sledges so the attackers would not have to crawl back for the supplies over the mine field. With the hand grenades being passed on along the trenches, the bridgehead was squeezed in from the north by the "rolling" tactics. The SS Panzergrenadier Regiment 24 Danmark took the Siivertsi cemetery attacking from the northern suburbs of Narva but could not destroy a Soviet machine-gun strong point inside a massive granite monument erected to the honour of the perished soldiers of the White Northwestern Army during the Estonian War of Independence. Eventually, the machine-gunners were killed by a flamethrower. Another machine-gun strong point was in the wreck of a Tiger tank, which was destroyed by Ago Loorpärg shooting at it from a trophy Soviet 45 mm gun.

The Soviet bridgehead was squeezed into a few hundred metres of river bank around the ruins of Vepsküla settlement by 5 March. In a surprise attack of the I.Battalion, Waffen-Grenadier Regiment der SS 45, the bridgehead was split into three parts and "rolled" down by hand grenades. A small Soviet bridgehead still left on the west bank was cleared by the II.Battalion, Waffen-Grenadier Regiment der SS 46 on 6 March.

The setbacks on Narva front came as an unpleasant surprise for the leadership of the Leningrad Front blaming it on the arrival of the Estonian Division. Both sides rushed for reinforcements. The 59th Army was brought to Narva and the 8th Estonian Rifle Corps placed under command of the Leningrad Front.

== Soviet offensives in March ==
=== Narva offensive, 1–4 March ===
On 1 March, the newly arrived Soviet 59th Army, supported by the fire of 2500 assault guns and more than 100 tanks, attacked the 214th Infantry Division from the Krivasoo bridgehead twenty kilometres south west of Narva. The goal of the attack was the nearest connecting road in Kuremäe village. After three days of fierce battle, the Soviet army broke through the defense and advanced towards the highway to Jõhvi. The 59th Army encircled the strong points of the 214th Infantry Division, and the Estonian 658th and 659th Eastern Battalions, which continued resisting. Lieutenant General Ivan Korvnikov in charge of the Soviet 59th Army delayed the advance, referring to the lack of artillery support and scarcity of manpower. This gave time for Frießner to move in all available forces and stop the Soviet advance. German losses in these battles were in the thousands.
A Soviet regiment of the 2nd Rifle Division attempted a surprise assault over Lake Peipus to seize the road along the north shore of the lake on 2 March. Up to 500 of them were killed by the 225th Infantry Division, with a large number of weapons, including seven assault guns gained as trophies. Units of the 59th Army attacked from the Krivasoo bridgehead on 4 March.

=== Narva offensive, 6–24 March ===
On 6 March, the new Soviet Narva offensive began with the air raid at Narva and the nine kilometre segment of Tallinn highway connected to the town. The explosives, attached to the main target, the bridge over Narva river were hit and blown up. The baroque style Old Town was levelled by 200 aircraft dropping 3600 bombs, with no buildings left intact. On the next night, another air raid followed at Ivangorod bridgehead on the opposite bank of the river. As the local inhabitants had been transported from the two towns, virtually no civilian casualties occurred. Instead, the German units remaining in the towns were heavily hit and a great deal of military equipment lost.
In the morning of 8 March, the Soviet air force and the artillery of the 2nd Shock Army fired 100,000 shells and grenades at the three weakened German regiments defending the town. The operation continued with the assault of the 30th Guards Rifle Division and numerous tanks, focusing on the 4th SS Volunteer Panzergrenadier Brigade Nederland Govorov realised that the Narva line could not be breached before the German bridgehead on the eastern side of the river was annihilated. On 11 March, a heavy assault was ordered at the ruins of the Lilienbach estate two kilometres to the north east from Narva, defended by the SS Panzergrenadier Regiment 49 De Ruyter. (Note: Commanded by Lieutenant Colonel Hans Collani, a veteran of the Wiking Division. Collani committed suicide in July 1944 when he mistakenly came to the conclusion that his command post was about to be overrun.) After an artillery duel between the 4th SS Volunteer Panzergrenadier Brigade Netherland and the advancing Soviet units, the attack disintegrated into fierce hand-to-hand fighting between Soviet infantry and outnumbered SS Volunteer Panzergrenadier Regiment 49 De Ruyter. After several hours of fierce combat, the 30th Guard Rifle Corps had suffered enough losses to fall back. Govorov decided to shift the focus of the Narva offensive to the north of Narva.

=== North of Narva ===
On 8 March, three Divisions of the 14th Rifle Corps attacked the positions of the Estonian Division in Siivertsi, five kilometres north of Narva. The artillery of the Estonian Rifle Corps was placed under their command. For the first time, Estonians were facing Estonians in combat over Narva river. Loudspeakers were set up on the Soviet side, calling the Estonians on the German side to swap side. On 17 March, after massive bombardment of the positions of the Estonian Division, and 500 deaths from the Soviet 1256th Rifle Regiment, the Soviets managed to establish a bridgehead on the west bank of the river eight kilometres north of Narva. Assisted by the artillery of the III Germanic SS Panzer Corps, the Estonian machine-gunners, placed along the bank, cleared the bridgehead by the following night. The three Divisions of the 14th Rifle Corps were destroyed and the remains reformed in the rear.

=== Soviet bombing raids against Estonian cities ===
The Soviet Long Range Aviation, subordinated directly to the Headquarters of Soviet Armed Forces, was committed to the task of bombing key Estonian towns of Petseri, Tartu, and the national capital Tallinn.

The heaviest of the air assaults was at Tallinn, on 9 March. A week before, the Mayor of Tallinn had given an order to the city dwellers to leave the town, but the evacuation failed. The extent of the attack was beyond the expectations of the local people and the headquarters of the Army Group North. A bombing run consisting of 300 IL-4 planes throwing 3068 bombs, 1725 of them explosive and 1300 incendiary, inflicted heavy damage to the city. The fire brigades were scarce on water, as Soviet saboteurs had blown up the city pumping station before the air raid. Military damage was minor, with a few military installations and supply stores destroyed. The major military loss was the burning of a million litres of fuel in the fuel depot. Of the enterprises with some military importance, the "Luther" plywood factory and the "Urania-Werke"-run cable factory were destroyed. Most of the bombs fell on the dwellings and public buildings, including the Estonia Theatre, St. Nicholas Church, the city synagogue, four cinemas, and the Tallinn City Archives with their collection of medieval documents. A large part of the wooden suburbs burnt down and the city centre suffered major damage. According to the official report, 757 people were killed, of whom 586 were civilians, 50 were military personnel, and 121 were prisoners-of-war. 213 had serious injuries, 446 had minor injuries. Amongst the injured were 65 military servicemen and 75 prisoners-of-war. Later, more victims were found, with the number of deaths estimated at up to 800. More than 20,000 people were left without a shelter in the spring thaw, while the military objects were almost untouched.

A bombing raid against Tartu conducted on the night before 26 March destroyed dwellings and public buildings in the city centre and killed 67 citizens. Petseri was bombed throughout the night before 1 April, causing severe damage to the town and the Holy Dormition monastery, and killing hieroconfessor Macarius, schema-bishop of Malovishery, who was declared a martyr by the Russian Orthodox Church.

Regarding the high number of civilian casualties and low damage to military and strategic installations in the cities, the Soviet bombing raids were conducted primarily to destroy the resistance morale of the local civilians. Regardless of Soviet intentions, the high civilian casualty toll of the raids had significantly increased the hostility of the Estonian public towards the Soviet army. On 27 February, a Soviet air raid had hit children playing in the school yard of Luunja Parish, killing four. The date of their burial was turned into a national memorial day, accompanied by the poem "Uus Heroodes" ("Modern Herod") published by Henrik Visnapuu. More Estonians felt an urge to fight against the Soviet advance. A slogan was written on the ruins of the Estonia Theatre, saying:

Varemetest tõuseb kättemaks! (Vengeance Will Rise from the Ruins!)

The slogan became the title of the newspaper of the Estonian Division.

=== End of offensive ===
On 17 March, the six divisions, armoured vehicles and artillery of the Soviet 109th Rifle Corps and the newly brought 6th Rifle Corps continued the Soviet offensive, attacking the weakened 61st Infantry Division in the defense of Auvere railway station. The goal of the offensive was the Corps headquarters on the Lastekodumägi by the Tallinn highway fifteen kilometres west of Narva. The defense by the 162nd Grenadier Regiment, having built up as an array of posts between the hills and the railway, was shaken by the massive preparatory gunfire and air attack. The Soviet 930th Regiment broke through the thinned defense line of the 61st Infantry Division to the railway, pushing towards the German headquarters. The six Soviet T-34 tanks were destroyed by the two Tiger tanks of Lieutenant Carius, forcing the Soviet infantry into withdrawal. On 22 March, the 61st Infantry Division repelled ten Soviet assaults. On the same day in Ivangorod, the Red Army troops annihilated the SS Volunteer Panzergrenadier Regiment 49 De Ruyter, 5th Company and broke in the regiment's rear. SS regimental headquarters troops assaulted the 150-man Soviet force, destroying them in heavy fighting, and retaking the regiment's trenches.
By the end of the Narva offensive on 24 March, the 2nd Shock Army had lost its combat-readiness for larger operations. According to an Estonian estimate, it had also suffered a toll of around 150,000 troops in dead and wounded. On 24 March, Govorov asked the Stavka for permission to switch the mode on Narva front from offense to defense. Army Group Narwa had suffered the loss of around 30,000 men.

== Strachwitz offensive ==
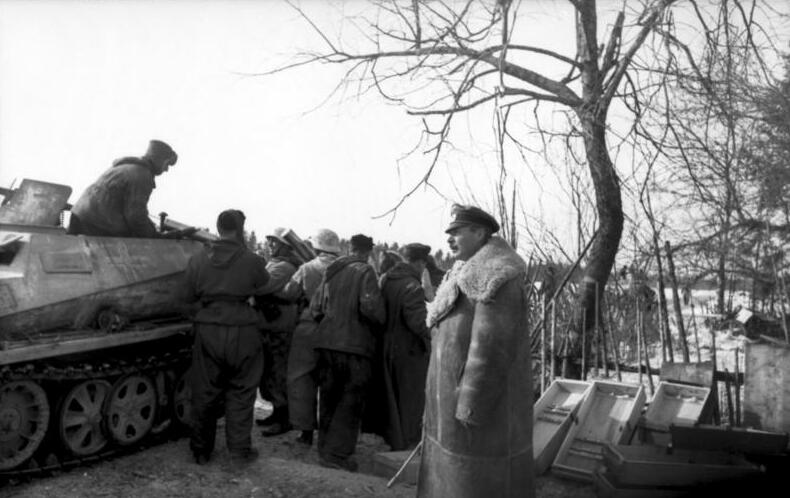
Strachwitz with fellow soldiers prior to the offensive, 21 March 1944

The High Command of the German Armed Forces were designing an offensive after a long while at the Eastern Front, choosing Narva as the location. Exploiting the favourable situation, commanders of Army Group Narwa regrouped, planning to destroy the Krivasoo bridgehead. On 26 March, the Strachwitz Battle Group (the German 170th, 11th, and 227th Infantry Divisions and tanks) targeted the flanks of the Soviet 109th Rifle Corps south of the Tallinn railway. The assault was supported by an air strike. Tank commander Hyacinth Graf Strachwitz von Groß-Zauche und Camminetz considered the heavy Tigers useless for operating in the swamp, exploiting the lighter Panther tanks instead. The East-Prussian grenadiers followed, penetrating the fortified positions of the Soviet Rifle Corps. The "Armoured Count" was out cheering the attackers on personally, driving his offroad vehicle to decorate the bravest with Iron Crosses, chocolate and cognac in the middle of the heaviest combat. By the end of the day, the Soviet 72nd and parts of the 109th Rifle Corps in the "west sack" of the bridgehead were encircled.

As Strachwitz had predicted, the Rifle Corps counterattacked on the following day. It was repelled by the 23rd East Prussian Grenadier Regiment, inflicting heavy casualties on the Soviet Rifle Corps. Small tank units in two groups broke through the lines of the Rifle Corps in several places, splitting the bridgeheads in two-halves. Fierce air combat followed, with 41 German dive bombers shot down. Attacking in small platoons the west half of the bridgehead was destroyed by 31 March, claiming 6,000 Soviet riflemen dead.

The "east sack" defenders of the Krivasoo bridgehead, defended by the Soviet 6th and the 117th Rifle Corps, were confused by Strachwitz Battle Group's deception attack on 6 April, intending to leave an impression of aiming to cut them out from the west flank. The actual assault came directly at the 59th Army from Auvere station, starting with heavy bombardment. The forest in the positions of the 59th Army was ignited and bombed by dive bombers. At the same time, the 61st Infantry Division and the Strachwitz tank squadron pierced deep into the 59th Army defense, separating the two rifle corps from each other and forcing them to retreat to their fortifications. Govorov was outraged by the news, sending in the freshly re-deployed 8th Army. Their attempt to cut out the Tiger I tanks from their rear was repelled by Lieutenant Günther Famula keeping the road to the supplies open. On 7 April, Govorov ordered to switch the mode on Narva front to defensive. The 59th Army, having lost another 5,700 troops for all purposes, was removed from the bridgehead. Strachwitz received the Knight's Cross with Oak Leaves, Swords, and Diamonds as the eleventh man in the history of the award on 15 April.

The 8th Army repelled the German attack, lasting from 19 to 24 April. The Germans lost 2,235 troops as dead and captured in the offensive, while the total of German casualties in April was 13,274, all causes. The Soviet casualties in April are unknown, but are estimated by Mart Laar to at least 30,000 men for all purposes. The losses exhausted the strengths of both sides. For May and June, the front stagnated with the exception of the artillery, air, sniper activity and clashes between reconnaissance platoons.

== Narva offensives, May and June ==
On 12 May, a battle was fought near Auvere. The German 112th Infantry Division counted 272 fallen Red Army soldiers on the battlefield. On 7 June, hundreds of Soviet guns opened up all across the seven-mile Narva front. The 13th Air Army encountered minimal Luftwaffe opposition. Special attention was paid to the positions of the Danmark Regiment. As the smoke from the bombardment cleared, the Soviet infantry attacked in human waves. The Nederland Brigade's artillery opened up, tearing holes in the advancing Red Army soldiers. Pushing through the fire, the Soviet troops made it to the Danmark Regiment's positions and began heavy fighting. Over the next days, the Danes held their positions against the Red Army. On 12 June, the 2nd Shock Army used larger units to attack German positions in the sector of the III SS Panzer Corps, XXVI and XXXXIII Army Corps in Ivangorod. On this day at the "Sunshine" outpost to the southeast of the Narva bridgehead, the Danish NCO Egon Christophersen literally saved the main front, when with a small assault troop he counterattacked German trenches that had been seized by the Russians and regained them in hand-to-hand combat. Christophersen and his men then defended the positions against all attackers, enabling the broken German lines to reconsolidate and hold. Christophersen was awarded the Knight's Cross. The attack was repulsed in 800 Soviet deaths.

Fighting went on for two more weeks with no substantial advance by either side. On 16 July, the Red Army forces found their way in the trenches of the SS Panzergrenadier Regiment 24 Danmark. The attack was repulsed by nightfall. On the afternoon of 20 July, the Soviet air force carried out a five-wave attack on Mustvee harbour, wounding 40–50 personnel of the German flotilla on the west coast of Lake Peipus.

While continuing attacks on the Narva front, the Stavka had begun to look elsewhere for their breakthrough. A new offensive, codenamed Bagration after the Napoleonic-era Russian field marshal, was launched on 22 June against Army Group Centre.

== Narva offensive, 24–30 July ==
=== Soviet preparations ===
For the commencement of the Soviet Narva offensive operation on 24 July, most of the Soviet units and artillery were concentrated in the Krivasoo bridgehead in the south. The Soviet operational goals were the Auvere railway station defended by the 20th Waffen Grenadier Division of the SS (1st Estonian), and the Sirgala settlement defended by the East Prussian 11th Infantry Division north west from the Soviet bridgehead. The first attack by the 8th Army was to be conducted by the 117th and the 122nd Rifle Corps. The rest of the 8th Army included the 124th and 112th Rifle Corps. Their goal was to break through the German defense of the station, while the 2nd Shock Army was to break through the defense of the III SS Panzer Corps stationed on the river north of Narva. The 2nd Shock Army included the 131st and the 191st Rifle Divisions, the 109th Rifle Corps, the 8th Estonian Rifle Corps, two artillery brigades, the 328th Separate Heavy Artillery Division, four Rocket Artillery Launcher Regiments, the 760th Anti-Tank Regiment, and 62 armoured vehicles. The two armies were to encircle and destroy the III SS Panzer Corps. In the prepared assault, the Soviet artillery had an eightfold superiority over its German counterpart. The Soviet air force consisted of 546 bombers against 49 German dive bombers. The standing manpower in the Krivasoo bridgehead was 46,385 Soviets against the 17,100 German troops at the defense of Auvere station. However, the Soviet force was unaware of the recently constructed Tannenberg line, granting the German side an element of surprise.

=== German preparations ===
The Soviet success in Belorussia and Ukraine brought the High Command of the German Armed Forces to propose a withdrawal of the Army Group Narwa and the 18th Army to the line between Riga and Daugavpils 400 kilometres south of Narva. The aim of the officers was to keep the battle front as short as possible and to use the available troops in Ukraine. On 12 July, the commander of the army detachment Infantry General Johannes Frießner proposed the plan to Hitler, whose reaction was to stand or die at the Narva line. Simultaneously, the German Headquarters had intelligence data on the Leningrad Front preparing for the Narva offensive. The Army Group North were out of reserves. Disregarding Hitler's order, Frießner ordered a new defensive line built, the Tannenberg Line (Tannenbergstellung), with the main defenses located on the three Sinimäed Hills fifteen kilometres to the west of Narva. On 21 July, Frießner asked permission to withdraw to the prepared positions. As Hitler was afraid, the Finnish will of resistance would suffer from it, he informed the Finnish High Command about his plans. Finding out, that the withdrawal to a new line was not considered a problem by the Finnish side, Hitler gave the order to retreat.

=== Battle of Auvere ===
In the morning of 24 July, the Soviet assault commenced with 30–50 batteries firing 17,000 shells and grenades (2,000 tons), inflicting significant casualties to the Waffen-Grenadier Regiment der SS 45 Estland in Auvere estate and 44th East Prussian Regiment in Sirgala settlement. After two hours of preparatory artillery fire, the two regiments were attacked from the air. Three German and eight Soviet bombers were shot down in air combat. Under artillery cover, the Soviet 122nd Rifle Corps and a tank brigade pierced into the East Prussian positions, while the 117th Rifle Corps encircled the Estonian regiment, who reformed themselves in a circular defense. Relieved by a company of Panther tanks and three Nebelwerfer rocket artillery launchers, the Estonians went on a counterattack. The East Prussians were saved by the swift movement of artillery behind them clearing their previous positions from the Soviets. Forces of the 117th Rifle Corps reached the headquarters of the 1st Battalion, Waffen Grenadier Regiment of the SS 45 Estland who resisted by heavy machine-gun fire in circular defense. The support by the anti-tank weapons of the 14th Company and the aid of the 11th SS Volunteer Panzergrenadier Division Nordland helped to seize the main front line back to the control of the Estonian Regiment. Subsequent attempts by the 117th and 122nd Rifle Corps to break through were repelled in a similar way, causing them to lose 3,000 men, compared to the loss of 800 troops of Army Group Narwa.

The Soviet attack at Auvere and Sirgala forced the III SS Panzer Corps to a hasty withdrawal from their positions in the Ivangorod bridgehead on the opposite bank of Narva. The Soviet 8th Army threatened to reach the Tannenberg Line before the Germans.

=== 2nd Shock Army crossing Narva River ===
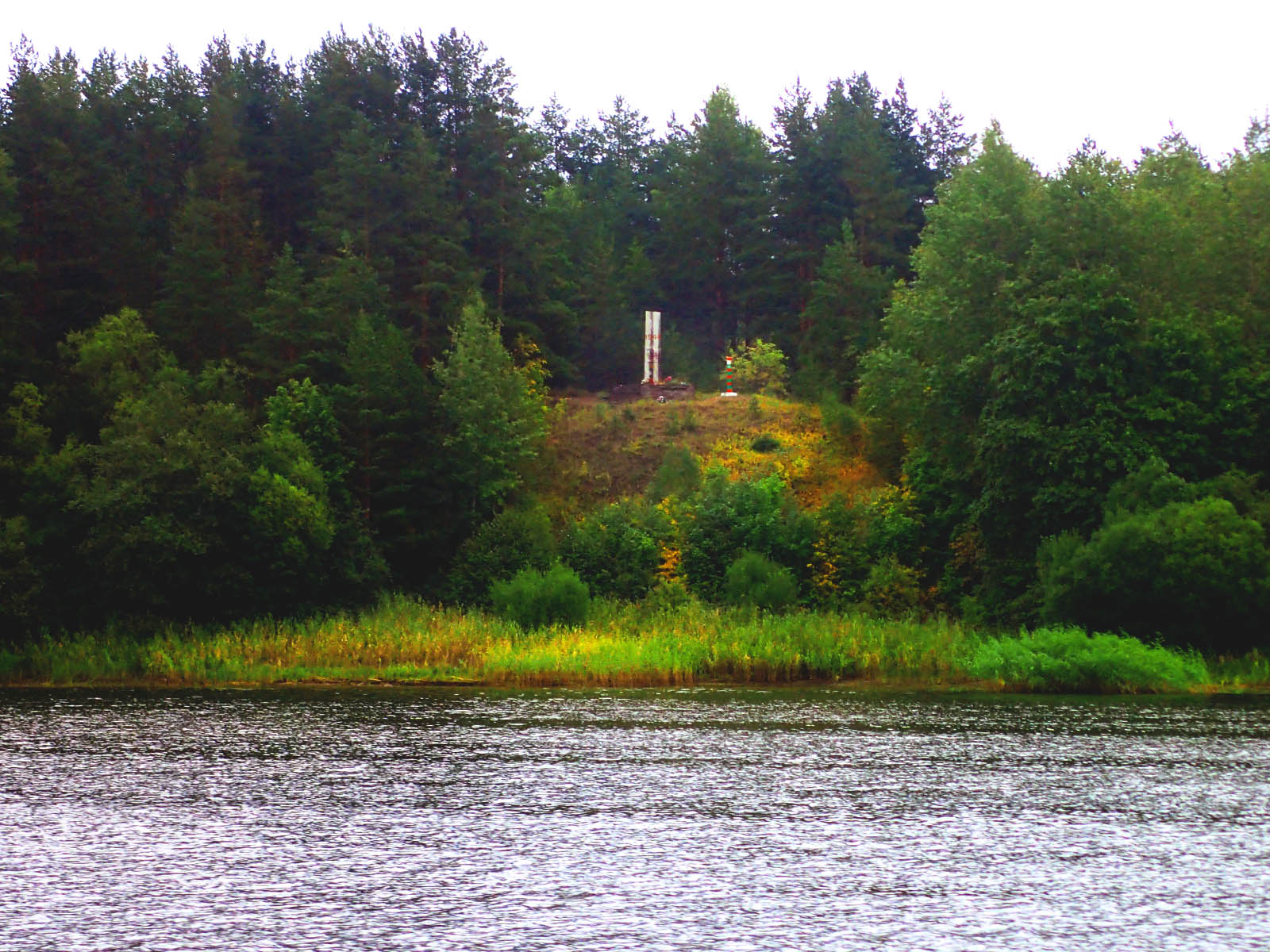
The memorial of the 2nd Shock Army's command post 1944

On the morning of 25 July 1944 Soviet assault guns fired 280,000 shells and grenades at the positions of the Estonian Division across Narva river, who were covering the right flank of the III SS Panzer Corps. The density of the assault guns was 160 per kilometre of front line. The shock made the trenches collapse on both sides of the front line. After the artillery strike, the bombers and assault guns moved in to destroy the remaining strong points. Regiments of the 131st and the 191st Rifle Corps were ordered to cross the river on boats and rafts, accompanied by "Svyaschennaya Voyna" and the anthem of the Soviet Union playing from the loudspeakers. The assault guns and the machine-guns of the 20th Waffen Grenadier Division of the SS (1st Estonian) along with the dive bombers destroyed the first attempts of the 2nd Shock Army, until the Estonians ran out of ammunition. The focus of the Soviet attack drifted to the Waffen-Grenadier Regiment der SS 46, causing it to lose co-ordination and retreat to the Peeterristi crossroads on the highway nine kilometres outside Narva. The retreat opened access to the Soviets behind the retreating Army Corps. The 131st Rifle Division advanced towards the highway, as the 191st Rifle Division turned south towards Narva to cut the Germans out.

=== Defense of German withdrawal along Tallinn highway ===
The Soviet advance along the river to Narva was faced by the 2nd Battalion, Waffen Grenadier Regiment of the SS 47. Major Alfons Rebane had saved the detachment from the Soviet bombardment by ordering them to dig into new trenches the night before. Aiming at the 2nd Battalion's positions according to their data, the artillery of the 2nd Shock Army had hit empty trenches. Inflicting heavy casualties to the 191st Rifle Division, the battalion stopped the Soviet from getting to Narva. As the 131st Rifle Division threatened to cut between Rebane's battalion and the 46th SS Regiment five kilometres to the west, Rebane shifted his front segment a kilometre towards the left. The assaults by the 556th and 546th Rifle Regiments were repulsed with great casualties by the Estonians rounded up to defend the highway by the Olgina estate.

In Peeterristi estate nine kilometres from Narva, Major Friedrich Kurg reassembled the 180 troops remained of the 2nd Battalion, Waffen Grenadier Regiment of the SS 46 to keep the 131st Rifle Division away from the highway and counterattacked. Luftflotte 1 was sent into the air to provide cover for the withdrawing III SS Panzer Corps. Despite their efforts, the 137 German aircraft were overwhelmed by the 800-plus Thirteenth Air Army. Suffering the near destruction of the Waffen-Grenadier Regiment der SS 46, the joint Estonian defense line with the 2nd Battalion, Waffen-Grenadier Regiment of the SS 47 some four kilometres to the west held the Soviet attack, while the III SS Panzer Corps withdrew across the Narva bridge to the Tannenberg Line. Behind them, the Corps destroyed the highway with road destruction machinery.

The German units that failed to retreat exactly on the agreed timetable, immediately faced heavy Soviet assaults. The main German casualty of the retreat to the Tannenberg Line were the 700 troops of the SS Volunteer Panzergrenadier Regiment 48 General Seyffardt. In the night before 26 July, the regiment was the last to leave Narva, while the Soviets were already gaining control of the highway behind them and Soviet armoured vehicles were crossing the Narva bridge. The Dutchmen of the 2nd Battalion, SS Volunteer Panzergrenadier Regiment 49 De Ruyter; covering the retreat of SS Volunteer Panzergrenadier Regiment 48 General Seyffardt, were rescued from encirclement by the 1st Battalion, SS Volunteer Panzergrenadier Regiment 49 De Ruyter. Encircled in the swamps between the highway and the railway, the withdrawing General Seyffardt were pinned down by the fighter-bombers of the Red Air Force and annihilated by the 191st Rifle Division.

In general, the withdrawal was completed according to the German plans. The SS Volunteer Panzergrenadier Regiment 49 De Ruyter started digging in on the left (north) flank of the Tannenberg Line, the 20th Waffen Grenadier Division of the SS (1st Estonian) in the centre, and the 11th SS Volunteer Panzergrenadier Division Nordland on the right (south) flank. The Red Army captured Narva, ending the six-month struggle for the town. While the Soviets celebrated victory, their main goal – the encirclement of the III SS Panzer Corps and the destruction of Army Group North – remained unreached.

== Casualties ==
According to the data of the Headquarters of Soviet Armed Forces, the casualties of the Leningrad Front in January and February 1944 were 56,564 dead or missing and 170,876 wounded or sick. The Leningrad Front also lost 462 armoured vehicles and 260 bombers during the period. The share of the battles around Narva is unknown. Estonian historian Mart Laar believes that, considering the length of the operation, roughly half of the losses can be accounted for the battle of Narva. According to his account, from 1 March to 14 September, the Leningrad Front lost 76,301 troops as dead or missing and 303,291 as wounded or sick in the Narva campaign. An estimated half of them account for March and April. Excluding the losses in the Narva operation, 24–30 July 1944 (accounted within the losses in the Battle of Tannenberg Line), Laar's estimates of the Soviet losses in the Battle for Narva Bridgehead total at approximately 65,000 dead or missing and 235,000 wounded or sick. This is in accordance with the estimation of the Soviet researcher F.I. Paulman, stating that the 2nd Shock Army lost more than 30,000 troops in February. Major General Rodin provided a different account, proposing 6033 dead or missing and 7144 as wounded or sick for the Leningrad Front in the Narva campaign but Laar disputes these numbers, insisting that they make no sense because the ratio of the dead to the wounded generally ranges from 1 / 3 to 1 / 4.

The German Army Group Narwa lost 23,963 troops as dead, wounded and missing in action in February 1944. During the following months until 30 July 1944, additional 34,159 German soldiers were lost, 5,748 of them dead and 1,179 missing in action. The total of the German casualties in the Battle for Narva Bridgehead is estimated at 12,000 dead, missing or captured and 46,000 wounded or sick.

== Order of battle ==
=== Soviet ===
As of 1 March 1944

Leningrad Front – Army General Leonid Govorov

- 2nd Shock Army – Lieutenant General Ivan Fedyuninsky
  - 43rd Rifle Corps – Major General Anatoli Andreyev
  - 109th Rifle Corps – Major General Ivan Alferov
  - 124th Rifle Corps – Major General Voldemar Damberg
- 8th Army – Lieutenant General Filipp Starikov
  - 6th Rifle Corps – Major General Semyon Mikulski
  - 112th Rifle Corps – Major General Filipp Solovev
  - 115th Rifle Corps – (HQ with no troops assigned by 1 Apr 1944)
- 59th Army – Lieutenant General Ivan Korovnikov
  - 117th Rifle Corps – Major General Vasili Trubachev
  - 122nd Rifle Corps – Major General Panteleimon Zaitsev

Separate corps and divisions:

- 8th Estonian Rifle Corps – Lieutenant General Lembit Pärn
- 14th Rifle Corps – Major General Pavel Artyushenko
- 30th Guards Rifle Corps – Lieutenant General Nikolai Simonyak
  - 45th Guards Rifle Division
  - 63rd Guards Rifle Division
  - 64th Guards Rifle Division

Attached to the Corps 31st, 46th, 260th and 261st Separate Guards Heavy Tank and 1902nd Separate Self-propelled Artillery regiments

- 124th Rifle Division – Colonel Papchenko Danilovich
- 3rd Breakthrough Artillery Corps – Major General N. N. Zhdanov
- 3rd Guards Tank Corps – Major General I. A. Vovchenko

=== German ===
Military formations subordinated to the Army Group Narwa (as of 1 March 1944)

- XXVI Army Corps – Infantry General Anton Grasser
  - 11th Infantry Division
  - 58th Infantry Division
  - 214th Infantry Division
  - 225th Infantry Division
  - 3rd Estonian Border Guard Regiment (as of 15 April)
- XXXXIII Army Corps – Infantry General Karl von Oven
  - 61st Infantry Division
  - 170th Infantry Division
  - 227th Infantry Division
  - 60th Feldherrnhalle Panzergrenadier-Division
  - Gnesen Grenadier Regiment
- III (Germanic) SS Panzer Corps – Obergruppenführer Felix Steiner
  - 11th SS Volunteer Panzergrenadier Division Nordland
  - 4th SS Volunteer Panzergrenadier Brigade Nederland
  - 20th Waffen Grenadier Division of the SS (1st Estonian)

Separate detachments:

- Eastern Sector, Coastal Defence – Lieutenant General Alfons Luczny
  - Estonian Regiment "Reval"
  - 29th Estonian Police Battalion
  - 31st Estonian Police Battalion
  - 32nd Estonian Police Battalion
  - 658th Eastern Battalion (Estonian)
  - 659th Eastern Battalion (Estonian)

Other military units

- Artillery Command No. 113
- High Pioneer Command No. 32
- 502nd Heavy Tank Battalion
- 752nd Anti-Tank Battalion
- 540th Special Infantry (Training) Battalion

== See also ==
- Estonia in World War II

== Notes ==
Footnotes

Citations
