= Czech Hell =

1945 killings of Estonian POWs in the Waffen-SS by Czech partisans

- Date: 7 May 1945
- Target: 20th Waffen Grenadier Division of the SS (1st Estonian)
- Attack type: Torture; Summary executions
- Deaths: 500−1,000 soldiers and officers
- Perpetrator: Czech partisans

Czech Hell (Estonian: Tšehhi põrgu) was an episode of vigilante justice during the Prague Offensive and the Prague Uprising, World War II in May 1945. It involved the imprisonment, torture, and summary executions of 500−1,000 unarmed soldiers and officers of the 20th Waffen Grenadier Division of the SS (1st Estonian) by Czech partisans.

== Background ==
The provisional government of Czechoslovakia was proclaimed in Košice on 5 April 1945. The Communist Party seized a third of the national government, including the ministries of the Interior and Defence. Vengeful attitudes countenanced by the communists led to massive vigilante justice against former personnel of the German armed forces after the German capitulation.

The surrendered German troops included thousands of officers and soldiers of the Estonian Division initially based around Hirschberg im Riesengebirge and Schönau an der Katzbach. They had been forcibly drafted into the Waffen SS and had received no special training apart from regular military drills; they had also not committed any war crimes.

== Action ==
The Estonian Division received orders on 7 May to retreat, assemble in Jablonec nad Nisou, move on through Prague in the direction of Plzeň and eventually surrender to the United States armed forces. Its headquarters and supply train began to retreat on the same day. Its units began to retreat the day after that. Czech partisans demanded that the German units surrender their arms, which the Estonians did. Subsequently, the partisans chased down and took some of the unarmed men prisoner, then tortured and humiliated them. The partisans did not differentiate between Estonian nationals, who had been illegally conscripted, and the German forces. The number of men killed has been estimated as 500−1000, but the actual number is unknown. Soldiers who had been in the custody of Czech partisans were reportedly relieved to be handed over to the Red Army.
