= 3rd Estonian SS Volunteer Brigade =

Estonian military unit, part of Waffen-SS

- 3. Estnische SS-Freiwilligen-Brigade
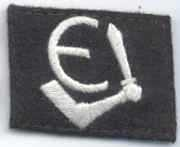
- Insignia of an Estonian SS Volunteer Brigade
- Active: December 1943 – March 1944
- Country: Nazi Germany
- Branch: Waffen-SS
- Type: Infantry
- Size: Brigade
- Training ground: SS-Truppenübungsplatz Heidelager
- Engagements: World War II

Commanders
- Notable commanders: Franz Augsberger

The 3rd Estonian SS Volunteer Brigade (German: 3. Estnische SS-Freiwilligen-Brigade) was a formation of the German Waffen-SS during World War II. It was formed in May 1943 at the SS-Truppenübungsplatz Heidelager near Dębica in the General Government through an expansion of the Estonian SS Legion (Estnische SS-Legion). Initially known as the Estonian SS Volunteer Brigade, it became the 3rd Estonian SS Volunteer Brigade in October 1943, when all SS brigades were numbered. The brigade was elevated to a division and renamed on January 23, 1944.

== Service history ==
In April 1943, the 1st Battalion of the Estonian Legion's sole unit, the 1st SS Volunteer Regiment, was renamed the Narva Battalion and dispatched to the front to replace the Finnish Battalion the SS Division Wiking. The Estonian Legion was then reorganised by German authorities into a brigade (Estnische SS-Freiwilligen-Brigade) in May 1943 to meet the increasing demand for troops. It completed its numbers through conscription of young Estonians. By December 1943, several weeks into the fighting, the brigade had the strength of 5,099 men.

In October 1943, the brigade was assigned its number and allocated anti-partisan duties in northern Belarus. According to Home Army intelligence, it departed from the Heidelager training ground on 20–22 October 1943. At the end of October, the Red Army broke through the German lines after intense fighting in the nearby Nevel section of the front. Since the German command had no reserves in the area, the Estonian Brigade was transferred to the front line where it pushed the Soviet forces back 5–15 kilometers by 13 November.

The Brigade was put under command of the VIII Corps of Army Group North. The brigade suffered severe losses fighting against numerous Red Army assaults and was eventually forced back to Opochka and transferred to the I Army Corps. It was then decided to create an Estonian Division and use the Brigade to form the cadre of the 20th Waffen Grenadier Division der SS (Estonian Number 1).

The brigade was expanded to a division and renamed the 20th Estonian SS Volunteer Division on January 23, 1944. It was returned to Estonia after the general conscription call where it was reformed into the 20th Waffen Grenadier Division of the SS (1st Estonian) established on May 26, 1944, when it absorbed all the other Estonian formations in the German military and some Estonian police units. The Finnish Infantry Regiment 200 was also assimilated.

== Commander ==
- Obersturmbannführer Franz Augsberger (22 October 1943 – 21 January 1944)
