= Battle of Tannenberg Line =

Battle of World War II

- Part of Eastern Front (World War II)
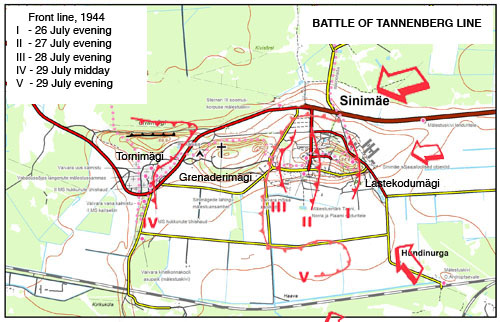
- Front line positions
Date	25 July – 10 August 1944
Location	Sinimäed Hills, Estonia 59°22′32″N 27°51′17″E
Result	German victory

Belligerents
Germany	Soviet Union

Commanders and leaders
Felix Steiner; Fritz von Scholz †	Leonid Govorov

Units involved
III (Germanic) SS Panzer Corps; XXVI Army Corps	2nd Shock Army; 8th Army; 8th Estonian Rifle Corps

Strength
22,250; 7 tanks 70–80 assault guns 49 aircraft	136,830 troops 150 armoured vehicles 1,680 assault guns 546 aircraft

Casualties and losses
3,500 / 2,500 killed or missing 6,600 / 7,500 wounded or sick 6 tanks Total: 10,100 / 10,000	7,700–7,800 / 35,000 killed or missing 28,000 / 135,000 wounded or sick 157–164 tanks Total: 35,000 / 170,000

The Battle of Tannenberg Line (German: Die Schlacht um die Tannenbergstellung; Russian: Битва за линию «Танненберг») or the Battle of the Blue Hills (Estonian: Sinimägede lahing) was a military engagement between the German Army Detachment Narwa and the Soviet Leningrad Front. They fought for the strategically important Narva Isthmus from 25 July–10 August 1944. The battle was fought on the Eastern Front during World War II. The strategic aim of the Soviet Estonian Operation was to reoccupy Estonia as a favorable base for the invasions of Finland and East Prussia. Waffen-SS forces included 24 volunteer infantry battalions from the SS Division Nordland, the SS Division Langemarck, the SS Division Nederland, and the Walloon Legion. Roughly half of the infantry consisted of the personnel of the 20th Waffen Grenadier Division of the SS (1st Estonian). The German force of 22,250 men held off 136,830 Soviet troops. As the Soviet forces were constantly reinforced, their overall casualties are estimated by Estonian historian Mart Laar to be 170,000 dead and wounded.

== Background ==
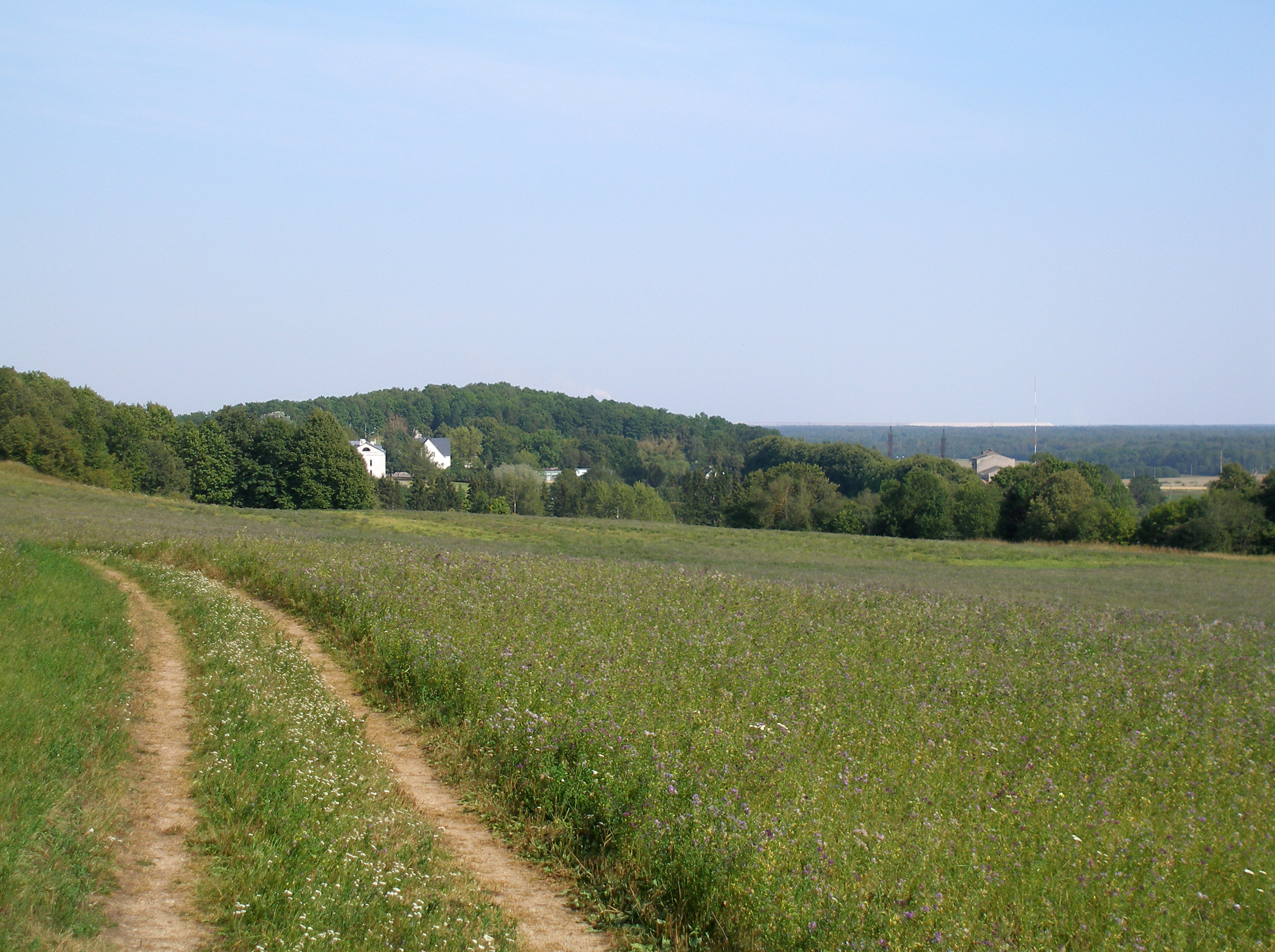
View from the summit of Grenadier Hill towards Orphanage Hill

After defending the Narva bridgehead for six months, the German forces fell back to the Tannenberg Line in the Blue Hills (Estonian: Sinimäed, Russian: Синие горы) on 26 July 1944. The three hills run east to west. The eastern hill was known as Orphanage Hill (Estonian: Lastekodumägi, German: Kinderheimhöhe). The central was Grenadier Hill (Estonian: Grenaderimägi; German: Grenadierhöhe) and the westernmost was Tower Hill (Estonian: Tornimägi, German: 69.9 Höhe '69.9. Hill' or Liebhöhe 'Love Hill'). The heights have steep slopes and rise 20–50 m above the surrounding land.

The formations of Gruppenführer Felix Steiner's III SS Panzer Corps halted their withdrawal and moved into defensive positions on the hills. The 4th SS Volunteer Panzergrenadier Brigade Nederland started digging in on the left (north) flank of the Tannenberg Line, units of the 20th Waffen Grenadier Division of the SS (1st Estonian) in the centre, and the 11th SS Volunteer Panzergrenadier Division Nordland on the right (south) flank. Another front section manned by the East Prussians of the 11th Infantry Division was situated a few kilometres further south, against the 8th Army in the Krivasoo bridgehead.

The Soviet Marshal Leonid Govorov considered the Tannenberg Line as the key position of Army Group North and concentrated the best forces of the Leningrad Front. Additional 122nd, 124th Rifle Corps and divisions from 117th Rifle Corps were subordinated to Gen. Ivan Fedyuninsky, commanding the 2nd Shock Army. The goal set by the War Council of the 2nd Shock Army was to break through the defense line of the III SS Panzer Corps at Orphanage Hill, force their way to the town of Jõhvi in the west and reach the Kunda river by 1 August. To accomplish this, Govorov was ordered to destroy communications behind the German forces and conduct air assaults on the railway stations of Jõhvi and Tapa on 26 July.

== Comparison of forces ==
=== Soviet ===
There is no complete overview of the order of the Soviet forces or the detachment sizes in the Battle of Tannenberg Line. For the attack on 29 July, Govorov concentrated all of the capable Soviet units, consisting of 11 divisions and six tank regiments. The Soviet units that had suffered losses were brought up to strength with fresh manpower. The delivery of Soviet heavy artillery complimented the nine divisions of the 109th, the 117th and the 122nd Rifle Corps. The 109th and 117th Corps were concentrated close to the Sinimäed, while the 122nd Rifle Corps was sent to the southern section, near the church of Vaivara Parish. The positions of the 11th Infantry Division were mainly attacked by the 35,000-strong 8th Army with their 112th Rifle Corps, two fresh tank regiments and 1,680 assault guns, deployed in nine artillery regiments and 150 armored vehicles. The armored forces included the brand-new IS-2 tanks with extra armor and a 122mm gun. The weakness of the tank was its limited ammunition capacity (only 28 rounds) and long reloading time for its main gun. The forces were supported by the 576-strong 13th Air Army. The Soviet order of battle (available data as of 28 July 1944):

Leningrad Front – Marshal Leonid Govorov

- 2nd Shock Army – Lt. Gen. Ivan Fedyuninsky
  - 109th Rifle Corps – Maj. Gen. Ivan Alferov
    - 72nd Rifle Division – Ilya Yastrebov
    - 109th Rifle Division – Maj. Gen. Nikolai Truzhkin
    - 125th Rifle Division – Col. Vassili Zinovev
  - 122nd Rifle Corps
  - 124th Rifle Corps – Col. Mikhail Papchenko
  - 131st Rifle Division – Maj. Gen. Pyotr Romanenko
  - 191st Rifle Division – Maj. Gen. Ivan Burakovski
  - 21st Engineers Brigade – Lt. Col. Vasilkov

Total: 26,850 infantrymen, 458 pieces of artillery, 112 tanks

- 8th Army – Lt. Gen. Filipp Starikov
  - 2nd "Masurian" Rifle Division
  - 377th Rifle Division
  - 112th Rifle Corps – Maj. Gen. Filipp Solovev
    - 48th Rifle Division – Col. Yakov Koževnikov
  - 117th Rifle Corps – Maj. Gen. Vasili Trubachev
    - 120th Rifle Division – Maj. Gen. Alexandr Batluk
    - 201st Rifle Division – Maj. Gen. Vyacheslav Yakutovich
    - 256th Rifle Division – Maj. Gen. Anatoli Koziyev

Total: 28,000 infantrymen, 518 pieces of artillery, 174 tanks and 44 self-propelled guns

Separate Corps and Divisions (possibly subordinated to one of the above-mentioned Armies):

- 8th Estonian Rifle Corps – Lt. Gen. Lembit Pärn
- 11th Rifle Division
- 43rd Rifle Division
- 98th Rifle Division
- 123rd Rifle Division
- 189th Rifle Division
- 206th Rifle Division

=== German ===
Against the Soviet forces, a few tired German regiments without any reserve troops stood at their positions, battered by the Soviet artillery. The commander of the Army Detachment "Narwa", General der Infanterie Anton Grasser, assessed the German capacity as insufficient against the Soviet attack. While sufficient in ammunition and machine-guns, the combat morale of many volunteers fighting for Germany was under heavy pressure while the spirit of some Estonian troops had already been severely damaged, in Grasser's opinion. However, the following combat proved the opposite. The small number of German Junkers Ju 87 dive bombers and shortage of aircraft fuel gave the Soviets massive air superiority. Grasser's conclusion was short:

The Army Detachment emphasizes that the situation is extremely intense and the great difference between ours and the enemy's forces demands the greatest attention from the High Command.

Leaving diplomatic formulation aside, Grasser announced that without immediate reinforcements, the Soviets would inevitably break through the Tannenberg Line on 29 June. Such reinforcements were beyond the capacities of Army Group North. The commander of the Army Group, Ferdinand Schörner, had repeatedly called Adolf Hitler's attention to the fact that virtually no division consisting of Germans was left at the Tannenberg Line, which was threatening to collapse. These calls had no effect, as Hitler's response remained to stand or die. The German order of battle (as of 28 July 1944) was:

Army Detachment Narwa – General of the Infantry Anton Grasser

- III (Germanic) SS Panzer Corps – SS-Gruppenführer Felix Steiner
  - SS Division Nordland – SS-Brigadeführer Joachim Ziegler
    - SS Panzergenadier Regiment 23 Norge – SS-Obersturmbannführer Fritz Knöchlein
    - SS Panzergrenadier Regiment 24 Danmark
  - 20th Waffen Grenadier Division of the SS (1st Estonian) – SS-Brigadeführer Franz Augsberger
    - Waffen Grenadier Regiment 45 – Waffen-Obersturmbannführer Harald Riipalu
    - Waffen Grenadier Regiment 46
    - Waffen Grenadier Regiment 47
    - Artillery Regiment
  - 4th SS Volunteer Panzergrenadier Brigade Netherlands – SS-Brigadeführer Jürgen Wagner
    - 4th SS Panzergrenadier Regiment De Ruyter
    - 5th SS Volunteer Sturmbrigade Wallonien – SS-Sturmbannführer Léon Degrelle
    - 6th SS Volunteer Sturmbrigade Langemarck - SS-Sturmbannführer Conrad Schellong
  - 227th Infantry Division - Generalmajor der Reserve Maximilian Wengler
  - 113th Security Regiment
- XXVI Army Corps – General der Infanterie Anton Grasser
  - 11th Infantry Division - Generalleutnant Hellmuth Reymann
  - 300th Special Purpose Division – Generalmajor Rudolf Höfer

Separate detachments:

- Four Estonian Auxiliary Police battalions
- Eastern sector, coastal defense – Generalleutnant Alfons Luczny
- Two Estonian border defense regiments
- 513th Naval Artillery Battalion
- 502nd Heavy Panzer Battalion
- 752nd Anti-Tank Battalion

Total: 22,250 troops deployed in 25 Estonian and 24 German, Dutch, Danish, Flemish, Italian, Norwegian and Walloon battalions

== Combat ==
=== Orphanage Hill ===
==== 26 July ====
On 26 July, pursuing the withdrawing Germans, the Soviet attack fell onto the Tannenberg Line before the vastly outnumbered Army Detachment Narwa had dug in. The Soviet Air Force and artillery covered the German positions with bombs and shells, destroying most of the forest on the hills. The Soviet 201st and 256th Rifle Divisions supported by the 98th Tank Regiment assaulted the positions of the SS Division Nordland, seizing the eastern side of Orphanage Hill.

==== 27 July ====
In the morning of 27 July the Soviet forces opened up another powerful artillery barrage on the Sinimäed. Anticipating an infantry attack, Steiner concentrated his few working armored vehicles, consisting of seven tanks. Units of the Nordland Division were placed between the two hills and the defense was completed by the Anti-Tank Company, 1st Estonian behind Nordland.

Under Soviet pressure the German defense threatened to collapse. On 27 July Schörner arrived at the Sinimäed. He ordered an immediate recapture of Orphanage Hill, demanding fanatical resistance from the soldiers. A meeting convened by von Scholz laid the tactics for the implementation of the orders. Immediately after the meeting, however, von Scholz was killed by a shrapnel splinter in front of the headquarters.

==== 28 July ====
For the next day the 2nd Shock Army was reinforced with the 31st and the 82nd Tank Regiments, three howitzer brigades and nine heavy artillery regiments.

In the evening of 28 July German forces attempted to regain Orphanage Hill again. Using the tactics of "rolling" small units into the Soviet positions, the troops seized the trenches on the slope of the feature. When a Soviet tank squadron arrived, the German attack collapsed. At a point occupied by the German 11th Infantry Division near the borough of Sirgala in the south, the Soviet tanks aimed to break through. Steiner ordered a withdrawal to a new defensive line at Grenadier Hill. The order did not reach a significant part of the German forces, which remained in their positions at Orphanage Hill. Anticipating a major attack, Steiner ordered the heavy weapons of the SS-Panzergrenadier Regiment Norge and the Danmark Regiment to be pulled together into two shock units. By the night of 28 July the battle had subsided.

=== Grenadier Hill ===
==== Preparatory fire ====
The morning of 29 July began with preparatory artillery fire of 25,000 shells fired by the Soviets. The bombardment covered the Tannenberg Line in a dust cloud. The forest on the Sinimäed Hills was entirely destroyed, with the trees cut down to a height of 2–3 metres. While having a great psychological effect, the "Katyushas" or so-called "Stalin organs" were inaccurate, causing little damage to the well-dug-in German troops. The 70–80 German Nebelwerfers answered. This was followed by Soviet bombers trying to hit the last of the German troops, ducking down in their trenches. Dressed in camouflage uniforms, they remained unseen by the Soviet pilots.

==== Soviet advance guards on Grenadier Hill ====
The attack of 6,000 Soviet infantry began at 09:00, supported by a regiment of nearly 100 tanks (most of them of the heavy IS-2 variety). They used their 122 mm guns to fire directly at the strongpoints showing any signs of life and destroyed the remaining bunkers. The remnants of the German advance guard were destroyed. The platoon commanded by Lt. Lapshin broke through to the top of Grenadier Hill. Special courage was shown by Sgt. Efendiyev, who destroyed a German strongpoint on the hill. The Komsomol organiser, V.I. Lavreshin of the 937th Rifle Regiment, who had been marching ahead of his troops with a red flag in his hands, erected it at the summit.

==== Attack of Soviet main forces ====
The principle of the Soviet attack in the Sinimäed was an overwhelming frontal shock, with only a few of the attackers presumed to have reached the target. With artillery fire preventing reinforcements being sent in from the German rear, the Soviet 8th Army went on the attack and drove a wedge into the north flank of the 11th Infantry Division. The Soviet main tactical goal, Grenadier Hill, was to be assaulted by the 6,000 troops of the 109th Rifle Corps. The 109th Rifle Division attacked Nederland, which was covering the hill from the north. The 120th Rifle Division hit Grenadier Hill from the east. The 72nd Rifle Division assaulted the II Battalion, 3rd Estonian Regiment, which was defending the northern flank. The 117th Rifle Corps stood ready to break through the last of the German defenses. Orphanage Hill fell to the Soviets with the 191st Rifle Regiment at the head of the attack. This unit suffered great casualties from the fire of the last defenders who in turn were either killed or forced to Grenadier Hill. With the seizure of Orphanage Hill, the Soviet 201st and the 256th Rifle Divisions were exhausted, as the 109th Rifle Division continued to press towards Grenadier Hill alone. The defenders were commanded by Josef Bachmeier, the head of the II Battalion, Norge. The 1st and 2nd Battalions, 3rd Estonian subordinated to Bachmeier had 20 to 30 men each. For the defense of Grenadier Hill, every available Estonian was sent into battle, including communications personnel. The central command post was destroyed by Soviet fire while the Germans, Flemish, Norwegians, and Estonians escaped destruction by lying down in their bunkers. Behind them at the summit of Grenadier Hill stood Nederland. The gaps created in the attacking infantry and tank line by the German artillery did not stop the Soviet advance.

The Soviet tanks besieged Grenadier Hill and kept circling it, all the while firing away at the defenders. Nevertheless, they could not capture the summit due to heavy casualties caused by the German anti-tank guns and the anti-aircraft guns pointing their barrels down the slope. Other Soviet tanks reached the westernmost hill Tower Hill. The defenders in their bunkers, which were poorly fortified from the north and the flanks, were destroyed. Among the Soviet tank commanders, starshina S.F. Smirnov destroyed five German strongpoints. One of the tanks reached the community center of the municipality of Vaivara, blasting a hole in the wall. This remained the westernmost point the Soviet armed forces reached in Northeast Estonia until late September 1944.

By noon on 29 July Soviet forces had almost seized control of the Tannenberg Line. German units counterattacked against the Soviets besieging Tower Hill; the second secured the Narva–Tallinn Highway in the west and the third unit counterattacked between Grenadier Hill and the railway a few kilometers to the south. After the counterattack, only one German Panther tank remained unscathed.

=== Germans capture Grenadier Hill ===
After the German counterattack the tactical situation at the Tannenberg Line remained unclear. The remains of the 2nd Battalion Norge at Grenadier Hill assaulted the Soviets. The latter suffered heavy losses but regrouped and cut the Norwegians off at the east side of the hill. On the western terrace of Grenadier Hill, Kampfgruppe Bachmeier and the 3rd Battalion, 3rd Estonian kept resisting. The Soviets started searching the bunkers for documents and prisoners. Steiner ordered an air assault using dive bombers from Tallinn Airport. The Soviets had anticipated the attack and had moved their self-propelled anti-aircraft units to Orphanage Hill. They shot down several German bombers and afterwards turned their fire on the German infantry.

Steiner had one more battalion to spare – the 1st Battalion, Waffen Grenadier Regiment 45 Estland (1st Estonian) which had been spared from the previous counterattacks because of the scarcity of able-bodied men. Sturmbannführer Paul Maitla requested reinforcements from the men in the field hospital. Twenty less injured men responded, joining the remains of the other destroyed units, including a unit of the Kriegsmarine (navy), and supported by the single remaining Panther tank. The counterattack started from the parish cemetery south of Tower Hill, with the left flank of the assault clearing the hill of the Soviets. The attack continued towards the summit under heavy Soviet artillery and bomber attack, getting into close combat in the Soviet positions. The small German grenadier units were moved into the trenches. Running out of ammunition, the German troops used Soviet grenades and automatic weapons taken from the fallen. According to some veterans, it appeared that low-flying Soviet bombers were attempting to hit every individual German soldier jumping between craters, from time to time getting buried under the soil by the explosions of Soviet shells. The Soviets were forced to retreat from Grenadier Hill.

=== Soviet attempts to regain Grenadier Hill ===
In the afternoon of 29 July the Soviet forces made eight attempts at regaining control of Grenadier Hill. The last of the German reserves were sent into the battle, including the supply troops. The two assaults by Maitla's improvised platoon at Orphanage Hill forced the Soviets to refrain from further attacks and gave the Germans time to regroup.

Reluctant to admit the catastrophe in his report to the Soviet High Command on 30 July, the Political Commissar of the Soviet 2nd Army falsely promised that Grenadier Hill was still in the possession of the Soviet 109th Rifle Corps. As justification for the failure to break through the German defenses, the report cited the weak cooperation between the artillery and the infantry. The report also mentioned the poorly coordinated action of the armored units, driving to the minefields, which were uncleared by the sapper units. The commissar made serious charges against the commanders of the units and claimed in his report that they were very drunk while attempting to command the attacks.

=== 30–31 July ===
On 30 July the battle continued in similar fashion. Soviet artillery increased the intensity of its fire to 30,000 shells, the German artillery answered with 10,000 rounds of its own. The subsequent attack by Soviet heavy tanks broke through the defenses of the 2nd Battalion, De Ruyter consisting of 35–45 capable men running between their heavy machine guns.

Simultaneously, Soviet platoons were climbing up Grenadier Hill under intensive German bombardment. Eventually the attack was repelled by German hand grenades. The Soviets attacked the II. Battalion, 3rd Estonian which, in close combat, destroyed 12 tanks and repelled this latest assault. Units of the Soviet 8th Army advanced in the forests of the southern section of the front.

On 31 July the Soviet command changed the direction of its preparatory artillery fire, this time aiming it behind the hill and cutting off the German defenders from the main army group. The gradual decrease in the number of shells fired by the Soviet artillery (9,000 rounds on 30 July) was evidence of the weakening of the Soviet attacks. Soviet infantry started climbing up Grenadier Hill. The Estonian units against them ran out of ammunition. The remnants of the I. Battalion, 3rd Estonian resisted the Soviet attacks on the southern flank.

That time the political commissar of the 2nd Shock Army admitted the failure to break through the defense. He explained it by stating the artillery fire was running late. The report presented the false assertion that the Germans had captured Grenadier Hill only on 30 July.

=== Soviet reinforcements in August ===
Receiving the order from Stalin to break through to Tallinn at all costs, Govorov made Fedyuninsky responsible for reaching Rakvere no later than 7 August. During the first days of August, the 2nd Shock Army received the 110th and 124th Rifle Corps as reinforcements, raising the number of troops to over 20,000 again. The 8th Army received similar additions to their forces with the 112th and 117th Corps ordered to join the attacks. Soviet tank forces were also restored, with 104 armored vehicles at their command. At the nine kilometre long segment of the front, 1,913 assault guns were collected, making it 300 guns per kilometer. 365 pieces of heavy artillery were aimed at Grenadier Hill and 200 at the Sirgala hamlet in the south segment. As the daily amount, 200,000 shells were supplied to the artillery. On 1 August, no combat took place, as both parties reorganized their forces. The Leningrad Front tried to shift the center of weight southwards.

=== German condition in August ===
The Army Detachment Narwa replaced its units with the less damaged detachments in the first days of August. Despite inflicting immense casualties on the Soviets, the Waffen-SS units were slowly getting worn down. The Nederland Brigade was reduced to the size of a regiment, while the two regiments of the Langemarck Sturmbrigade each had the strength of a reinforced company. The 2nd Estonian Regiment was virtually lost and the Nordland Division a shadow of its former self. To the German's good fortune, Soviet intelligence severely overestimated the strength of the defenders to more than 60 tanks and 800 pieces of artillery while in fact there were just one tank and 70–80 guns left at the Tannenberg Line.

=== Finale ===
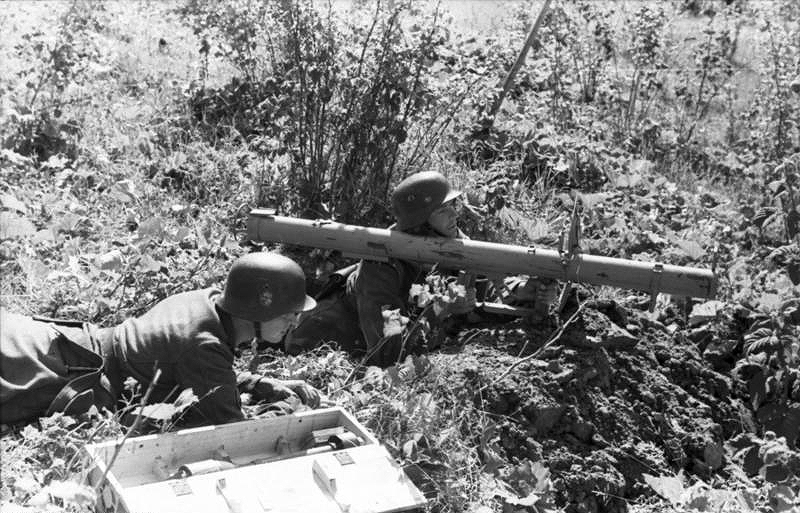
German soldier equipped with a Panzerschreck in August 1944

By 2 August, the 2nd Shock Army had re-deployed and assaulted, using the same tactics as previously. The men of Nederland who survived the artillery bombardment, retreated down the slopes of Grenadier Hill pursued by the Soviet units. In Steiner's memoirs, the intensity of the fire and the nature of the battles reminded him of the Battle of Verdun. When the artillery barrage ended, the freshly drafted II.Battalion, Waffen-Grenadier-Regiment der SS 46 (2nd Estonian) returned fire after inflicting severe casualties on the assaulting Soviets and counterattacked, reclaiming Grenadier Hill. Soviet tanks broke through in the southeastern section of the front.

On 3 August, the Soviets made a stronger attempt with the preparatory artillery fire of 25,000–30,000 shells reaching the level of the attack of 29 July. The fire caused heavy casualties, while a part of the defenders left their positions. Eleven Soviet rifle divisions and four tank regiments tried to spread their attack along the front. However, the main weight of the impending attack tended to be at Grenadier Hill once more. The German artillery noticed the concentration of the Soviet forces, and launched their rocket fire, inflicting numerous casualties on the Soviet infantry and tanks before the beginning of the attack. As the German artillery fire did not dent the Soviet superiority in manpower, the Soviet attack began as scheduled. The 110th Rifle Corps assaulting Grenadier Hill found themselves in the middle of cross-fire from the remnants of the I.Battalion, 2nd Estonian Regiment. As the commanders of the rifle corps erroneously reported to army headquarters on the capture of Grenadier Hill, the artillery fire was lifted. The Estonians counterattacked and cleared the hill.

In a similar fashion, the Soviets made two more attacks on 3 August. Each of them began with a massive artillery barrage and ended with a German counterattack, restoring the previous positions. Overall on 3 August, twenty Soviet tanks were destroyed. The Soviet attacks from 4 to 6 August were weaker; on 4 August, eleven tanks were destroyed, and seven more on 5 August. During the night before 6 August, six tanks were knocked out. On 10 August, the war council of the Leningrad Front ordered the termination of the offensive and switch strictly to defense. The Soviets reduced their operations to patrol activities with occasional attacks. The defenders used this respite to rotate several exhausted units out of the line for a few days for rest and refit, and to strengthen their positions. Until mid-September, the front stayed quiet.

== Casualties ==
In the era of the Soviet Union, losses in the Battle of Tannenberg Line were not mentioned in Soviet sources. In recent years, Russian authors have published some figures but not for the whole course of the battle. The number of Soviet casualties can only be estimated by looking at other figures. In the attack of 29 July, 225 men survived of the Soviet 109th Rifle Corps carrying the main weight of the assault. Of the 120th Rifle Division, 1,808 men were lost; killed or wounded. The rest of the Soviet rifle corps lost their capacity for further attacks. In the same attack, the German forces lost 600 men. The headquarters of the 2nd Shock Army reported 259 troops fit for combat within the 109th Rifle Division and a total exhaustion of the army on the night before 1 August, which probably meant a few thousand troops fit for combat out of the 46,385 men who had initiated the Estonian Operation on 25 July. The losses of the 8th Army were similar to that.

In the evening of 29 July, the Army Detachment Narwa counted 113–120 Soviet tanks destroyed, almost half of them in the battles of 29 July. The 2nd Shock Army reported on fifty of their tanks destroyed on 29 July. The German side counted an additional 44 Soviet tanks destroyed on 3–6 August.

Russian author Grigoriy F. Krivosheev, in his account "Soviet casualties and combat losses in the twentieth century", lists 665,827 casualties suffered by the Leningrad Front in 1944, 145,102 of them as dead, missing in action, or captured. Estonian historian Mart Laar, deducting the losses in the Leningrad-Novgorod Offensive, Battle for the Narva Bridgehead and the combat in Finland estimates the number of Soviet casualties in the Battle of Tannenberg Line as 35,000 dead or missing and 135,000 wounded or sick. Based on numbers of TsAMO f.217, op.1244, d.643 (Leningrad Front HQ, "Summary reports on losses submitted to the General Staff") losses of Leningrad Front in August 1944: 1,702 killed, 6,538 wounded in action and 196 missing in action. And for September: 2,366 killed, 8,405 wounded in action and 105 missing in action.

The German Army Group North buried 1,709 men in Estonia between 24 July and 10 August 1944. Added to the men missing in action, the number of irrecoverable casualties in the period is approximately 2,500. Accounting the standard ratio 1:4 of irrecoverable casualties to wounded, the total number of German casualties in the Battle for Tannenberg Line is approximately 10,000 men.

== Aftermath ==
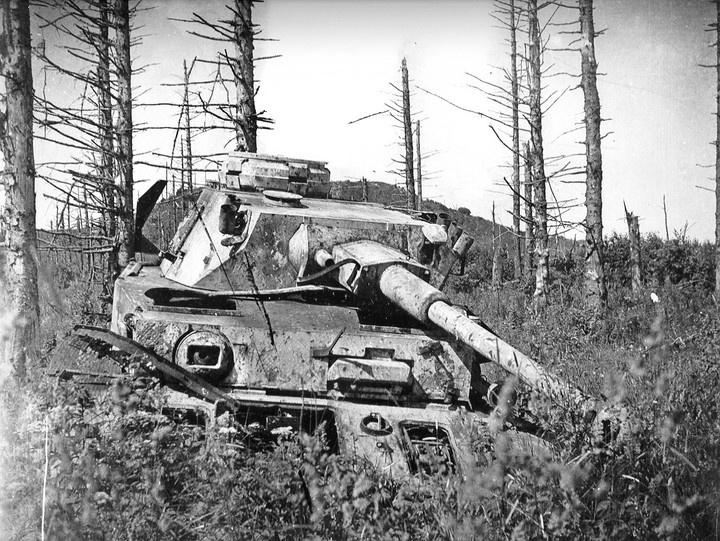
1949 photo showing the extent of damage to the once forested approach to the hills of Sinimäed. Disabled Panzer IV in the foreground.

On 14 September, the Riga Offensive was launched by the Soviet 1st, 2nd and 3rd Baltic Fronts. It was aimed at capturing Riga and cutting off Army Group North in Courland, western Latvia. After much argument, Adolf Hitler finally agreed to allow the evacuation of all the troops in Estonia. After months of holding the line, the exhausted men of the III SS Panzer Corps joined the withdrawal; fighting their way back from the Tannenberg Line. On 17 September, the 3rd Baltic Front launched the Tallinn Offensive from the Emajõgi River Front joining Lake Peipus with Lake Võrtsjärv. The operation was aimed at encircling the Army Detachment Narwa. Unable to hold the force, the German units withdrew towards the northwest while the incomplete II Army Corps was left to stall the Soviet attack. German forces withdrew quickly towards the Latvian border. On 22 September, Tallinn was abandoned. Some of the Estonian formations now began to attack the retreating Germans, attempting to secure supplies and weapons to continue a guerrilla war as the Forest Brothers against the Soviet occupation. Several troops of the Estonian Division stayed in Estonia. These units continued fighting, some survivors joining the guerrilla groups which fought the Soviet occupying forces until the end of the 1970s.

== In popular culture ==
- The battle is featured in the 2015 Estonian war drama 1944.
