= Estonian Legion =

Estonian military unit during WW II, part of Waffen SS

- Eesti Leegion; Estnische Legion
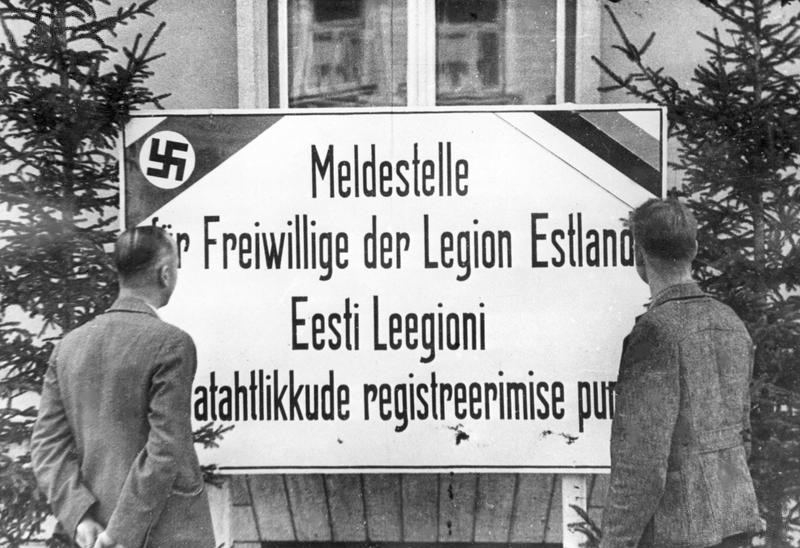
- "Registration point for the volunteers of the Estonian Legion", September 1942.
- Active: October 1942 – May 1943
- Disbanded: May 1943
- Country: Nazi Germany
- Branch: Waffen-SS
- Type: Infantry
- Size: Regiment
- Training ground: SS-Truppenübungsplatz Heidelager
- Engagements: World War II

Commanders
- Notable commanders: Franz Augsberger

The Estonian Legion (Estonian: Eesti Leegion; German: Estnische Legion) was a unit of the German Waffen-SS during World War II, mainly consisting of Estonian soldiers. It was led by an Austrian SS functionary Franz Augsberger.

== Creation ==
The formation was announced on 28 August 1942 by the German occupying powers in Estonia and formally established on 1 October 1942 with quarters in the SS-Truppenübungsplatz Heidelager at Pustków near Dębica in the General Government. Oberführer Franz Augsberger was named commander of the legion and of the later 3rd Estonian SS Volunteer Brigade. By 13 October 1942, 500 volunteers had signed up for the Legion. In the spring of 1943 additional men were drafted from the police forces and the number rose to 1,280.

== Units ==
=== Battalion Narva ===
Battalion Narva formed from the first 800 men who finished their training at Dębica (Heidelager in 1943), and were sent in April 1943 to join the Division Wiking in Ukraine. They replaced the Finnish Volunteer Battalion, recalled to Finland for political reasons.

The Battalion Narva was in the focus of the Red Army's attack near Izium in Ukraine. The unit entered the battle with 800 men, and only one third were left able to fight. The Red Army however, suffered heavier losses, over 7,000 men, and over 100 tanks.

Battalion Narva participated in the battle of the Korsun-Cherkassy Pocket. Retreating through the escape route called Hell's Gate, the battalion came under heavy Soviet fire with little cover. The battalion lost almost all of its equipment during the carnage although most of the troops escaped the encirclement.

=== 3rd Estonian SS Volunteer Brigade ===
The German occupying powers forcibly mobilized all Estonian men born between 1919–1924 in March 1943. As a result 5,300 men were conscripted into the Estonian Legion and 6,800 into the support service of the Wehrmacht. Of the conscripts was formed the second Estonian regiment and the Estonian SS Volunteer Brigade was established on 5 May 1943.

Another draft round was announced in October 1943 for men born in 1925–1926. As a result about 5,000 men escaped to Finland to avoid the draft. Most of these men volunteered for service in the Finnish Defence Forces and formed the Finnish Infantry Regiment 200. The conscripts were included in the Estonian SS Volunteer Brigade, renamed the 3rd Estonian SS Volunteer Brigade on 22 October 1944.

=== 20th Waffen Grenadier Division of the SS ===
By January 1944 the German military situation in the Eastern front had worsened so far that a general conscription call was announced in Estonia on 1 February 1944. In hopes of restoring the independence of Estonia, the last prime minister of Estonia, Jüri Uluots, supported the draft. As a result about 38,000 men were conscripted, the units of the Estonian Legion and Finnish Infantry Regiment 200 were returned to Estonia and reformed into the 20th Waffen Grenadier Division of the SS (1st Estonian).

== See also ==
- Estonia in World War II
- Latvian Legion
- Legion of French Volunteers Against Bolshevism
