= Franz Augsberger =

Schutzstaffel general

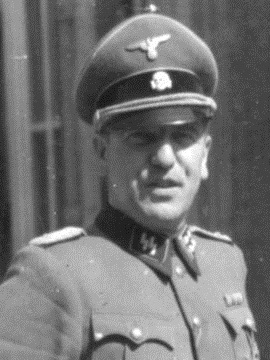
- Born: 10 October 1905; Vienna, Austria-Hungary
- Died: 19 March 1945 (aged 39); Neustadt, Oberschlesien, Nazi Germany
- Military career
- Allegiance: Nazi Germany
- Branch: Waffen-SS
- Rank: SS-Brigadeführer und Generalmajor der Waffen-SS
- Commands: 20th Waffen Grenadier Division of the SS (1st Estonian)
- Conflicts: World War II
- Awards: Knight's Cross of the Iron Cross

Franz Xaver Josef Maria Augsberger (10 October 1905 – 19 March 1945) was a high-ranking Austrian SS commander during World War II. He was killed in action in March 1945.

== Career ==
Born in Austria in 1905, Franz Augsberger joined the Sturmabteilung (SA) and the Nazi Party (NSDAP) in 1930. He was in charge of the NSDAP's propaganda until June 1933, when the Nazi Party was declared illegal in Austria. Augsberger moved to Germany and joined the Schutzstaffel (SS) in 1932. On 1 October 1934 Augsberger joined the SS-Verfügungstruppe (SS Dispositional Troops; SS-VT), and became a platoon leader until 18 March 1935. He was then recommended to attend the first class at SS-Führerschule (Officer candidate school) in Braunschweig, where he began classes in April 1935. He was also given the rank of SS-Hauptscharführer on 1 April 1935. After passing the final exams, he was again promoted to the rank of SS-Standartenoberjunker in January 1936. After having been promoted to the rank of SS-Obersturmführer in 1936 and SS-Hauptsturmführer in 1937 and having received additional training at the Rasse und Siedlungshauptamt he returned to the school in Braunschweig, where he became an instructor, teaching weapons courses, followed by a year of teaching at the SS officer school in Bad Tölz until March 1939.

At the beginning of March 1939, Franz Augsberger was moved to the SS-Standarte Der Führer where he remained until the beginning of August. He was temporarily reassigned to an Allgemeine-SS command in Villach with the rank of SS-Sturmbannführer on 1 August 1939. He was returned to his permanent regiment Der Führer assignment, where his Allgemeine-SS rank was changed to SS-Hauptsturmführer on 21 March 1940, which would correspond to his Waffen-SS rank.

Augsberger was appointed the commander of a regiment in the 6th SS Mountain Division Nord. In May 1942 he was awarded the German Cross in Gold. In October 1942 Augsberger was appointed the commander of 3rd Estonian SS Volunteer Brigade. In 1944 the brigade was enlarged to form the 20th Waffen Grenadier Division of the SS (1st Estonian), with Augsberger remaining the unit's commander. Augsberger commanded the division during the long retreat of the German forces on the Eastern Front. In early March he was awarded the Knight's Cross of the Iron Cross by Field Marshal Ferdinand Schörner. On 19 March, he was killed in action as a result of a bomb explosion in the barracks in Neustadt, Oberschlesien.

== Awards ==
- German Cross in Gold on 30 May 1942 as SS-Sturmbannführer in the SS-Infanterie-Regiment 7 (motorized)
- Knight's Cross of the Iron Cross on 8 March 1945 as SS-Brigadeführer und Generalmajor der Waffen-SS and commander of the 20. Waffen-Grenadier-Division der SS (estnische Nr. 1)

== See also ==
- Occupation of Estonia by Nazi Germany

Military offices
Preceded by none	Commander of 11. SS-Freiwilligen-Panzergrenadier-Division "Nordland"; 22 March 1943 – 1 May 1943	Succeeded by SS-Gruppenführer Fritz von Scholz
