= Rudolf Bruus =

Estonian lieutenant colonel

Rudolf Bruus (1 February 1916 Berdiansk, Taurida Governorate – 16 March 2005) was an Estonian military personnel (Lieutenant Colonel).

In 1938 he graduated from the military school in Estonia. In 1941 he started to fight for German military forces. He was the commander of a German battalion.

Awards:

- 1997: Order of the Cross of the Eagle, II class.
