= Sinimäed Hills =

Hill group in Estonia

Coordinates: 59°22′30″N 27°52′00″E

The Sinimäed Hills (or Blue Hills; Estonian: Vaivara Sinimäed) are three linked hills in northeastern Estonia. The heights which are aligned west–east, consist of Tornimägi, Põrguaugu mägi (also known as Grenadierimägi) and Pargimägi (also known as Lastekodumägi). They lie in Narva-Jõesuu municipality near the coastal town of Sillamäe in Ida-Viru County.

The hills are best known as the location of the Battle of Tannenberg Line, fought in World War II on July 26 – August 12, 1944. There, the German Waffen-SS defeated a Soviet offensive.

== Geography ==
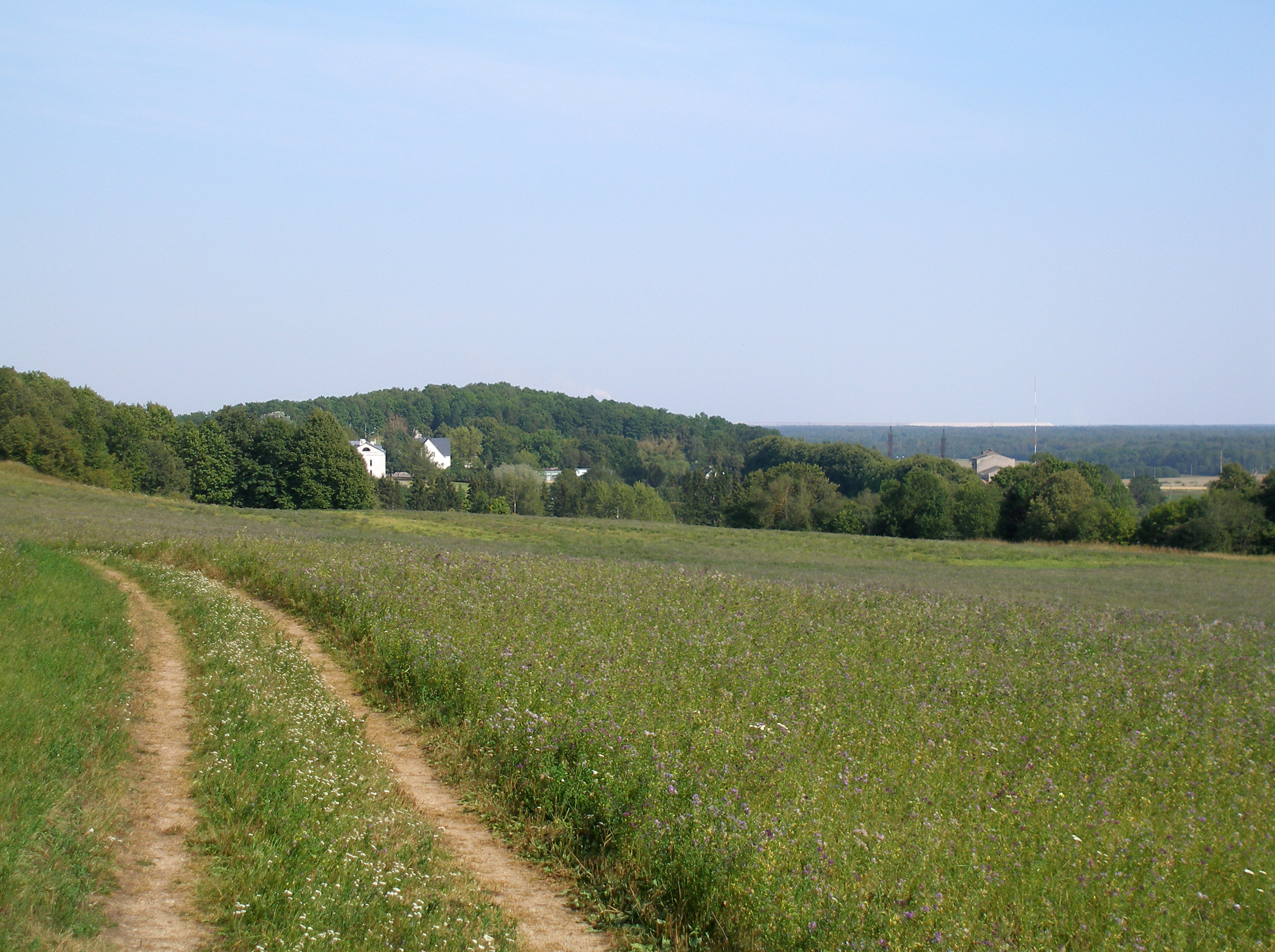
View from Põrguaugu mägi towards Pargimägi

The Sinimäed hills are gently sloping mounds rather than mountains. Nevertheless, the hills are a dominant landform in the area - the height of the surrounding limestone plateau is on average 30 m above sea level, while the hills are up to 50 m higher. Pargimägi and Põrguaugu mägi are the two higher hills - 85 and 83 m, respectively, while Tornimägi is somewhat lower, 70 m. The ridge is about 3 km long.

The location of the hills on a 5 km wide strip between the Finnish Gulf and the woods and bogs of Alutaguse is the origin of their strategic importance. Tallinn-Narva highway (E20) passes the hills from the north and Tallinn-Tapa-Narva railway from the south.

The hills have at their core huge blocks of limestone, but their geological origin is not clear. They are believed to be formed either by continental glacier (terminal moraine) or by clay diapirs, or by the combination of both factors.

== Military history ==
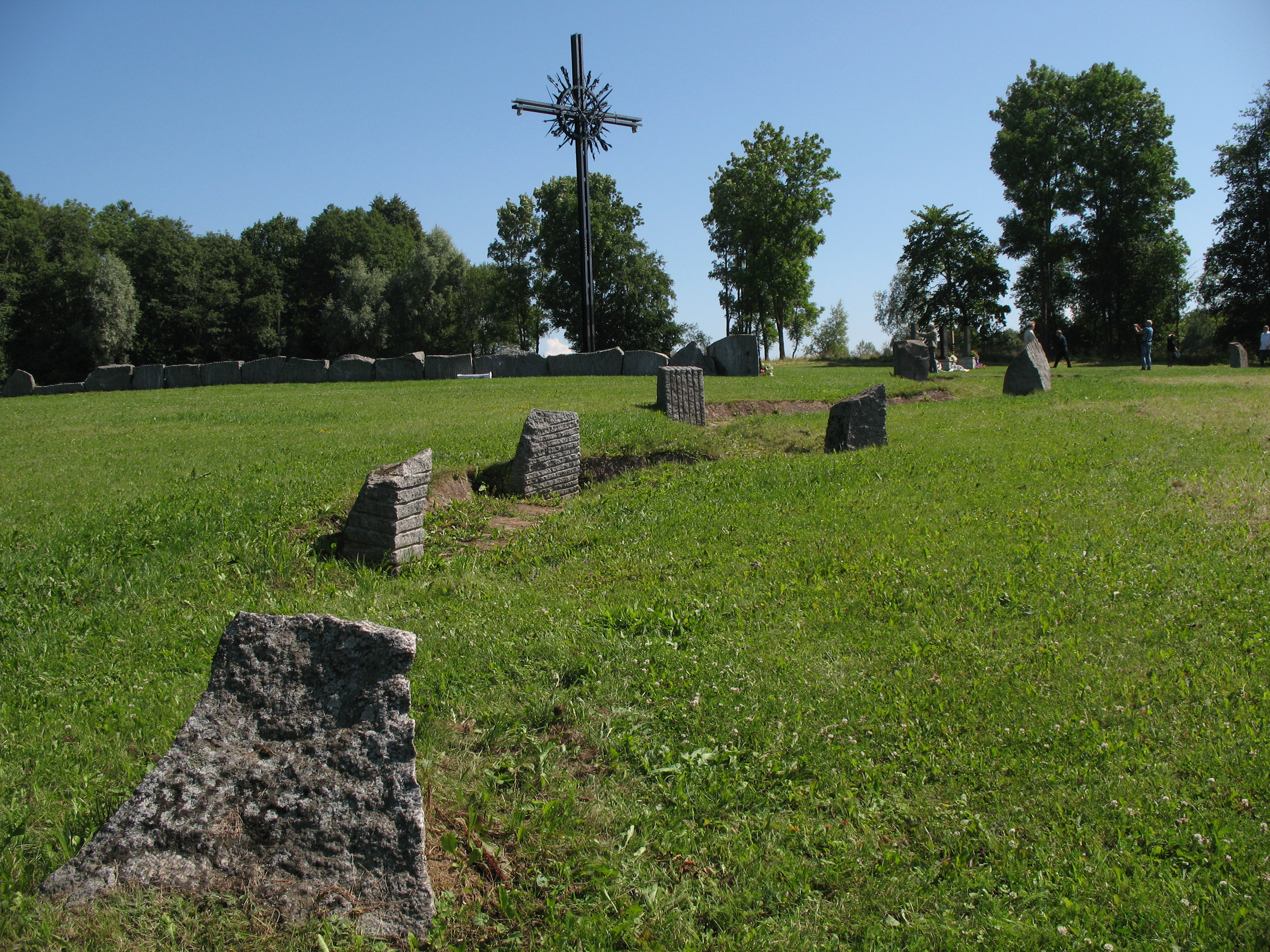
The memorial of The Battle of the Blue Hills. Trench lines marked in the foreground. Monument to the fallen soldiers of the 20th Waffen Grenadier Division of the SS in the background.

The western hill, Tornimägi, had an outpost during the Great Northern War.

During World War I, Pargimägi with its defensive structures was part of Saint Petersburg's preliminary defence line.

The Blue Mountains saw fighting in 1919 in Estonian War of Independence.

Extensive battles took place at the Sinimäed towards the end of World War II. (see Battle of Tannenberg Line). After defending the Narva bridgehead against the Red Army for six months, the German army detachment "Narwa" fell back to the Tannenberg Defensive Line on the hills. In two ferocious battles lasting for 25–31 July and 2–10 August 1944 with a break of a single day, the vastly outnumbered German army group held out under the pressure of the Estonian Operation of the Soviet Leningrad Front.

In German, the eastern hill was known as Kinderheimhöhe, the central hill was Grenadierhöhe and the westernmost known as Liebhöhe. There is a memorial site to commemorate the fallen on the hill of Põrgumägi.

== See also ==
- Sinimäed (film)
