= Estonia in World War II =

Clockwise from top left: Tallinn after the great Soviet bombing raid; Platoon of Estonian Forest Brothers; Estonian commanders Rebane, Nugiseks and Riipalu; Estonian armoured regiment on march in 1940; Estonian MG team in the Battle of Tannenberg Line; conscripts of the Estonian Legion

Estonia declared neutrality at the outbreak of World War II (1939–1945), but the country was repeatedly contested, invaded and occupied, first by the Soviet Union in 1940, then by Nazi Germany in 1941, and ultimately reinvaded and reoccupied in 1944 by the Soviet Union.

== Background ==
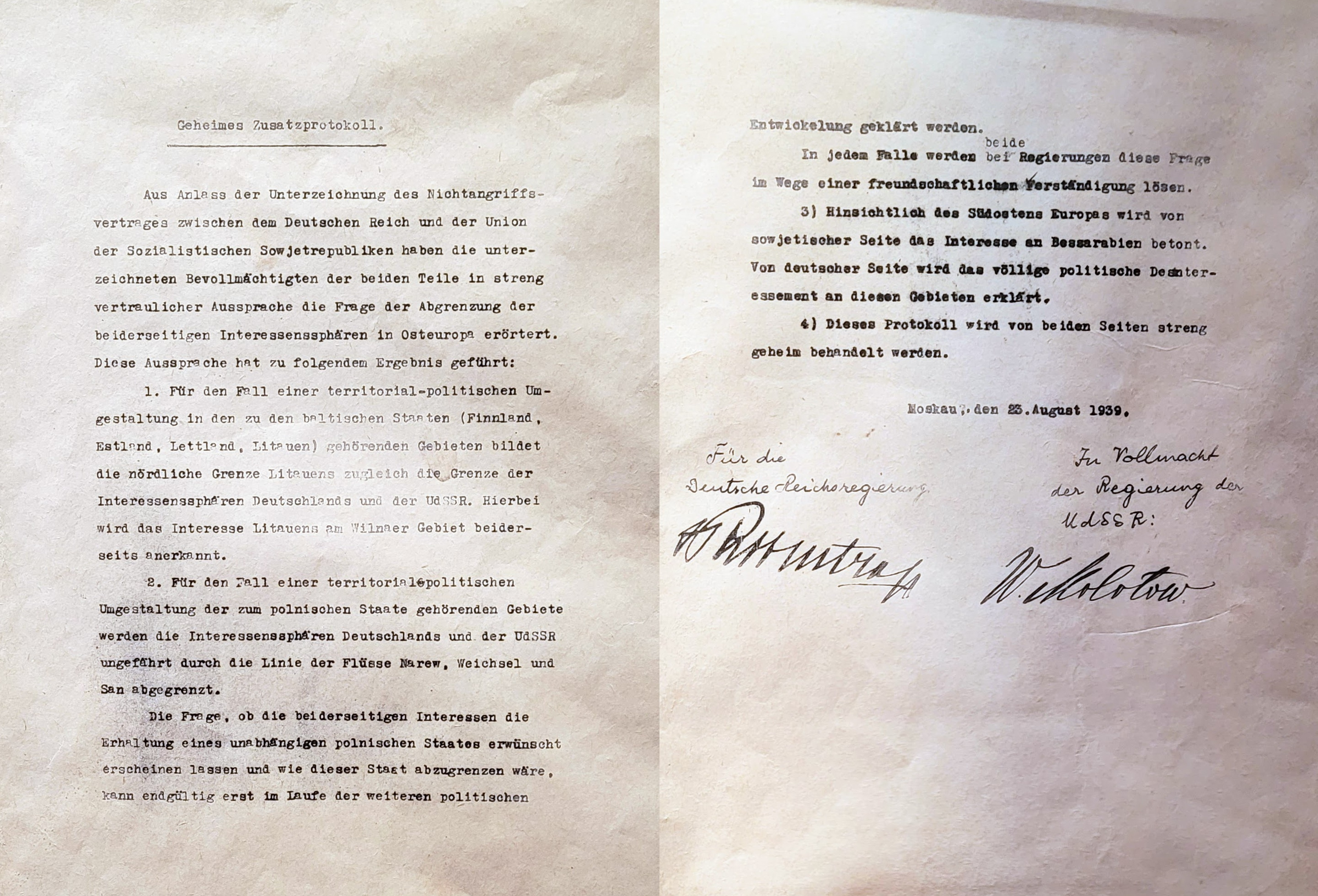
According to the 1939 Molotov–Ribbentrop Pact "the Baltic States (Finland, Estonia, Latvia, Lithuania)" were divided into German and Soviet "spheres of influence" (German copy)

Immediately before the outbreak of World War II, in August 1939, Germany and the Soviet Union signed the Nazi-Soviet Pact (also known as the Molotov–Ribbentrop Pact, or the 1939 German-Soviet Nonaggression Pact), concerning the partition and disposition of Poland, Finland, Lithuania, Latvia, and Estonia, in its Secret Additional Protocol.

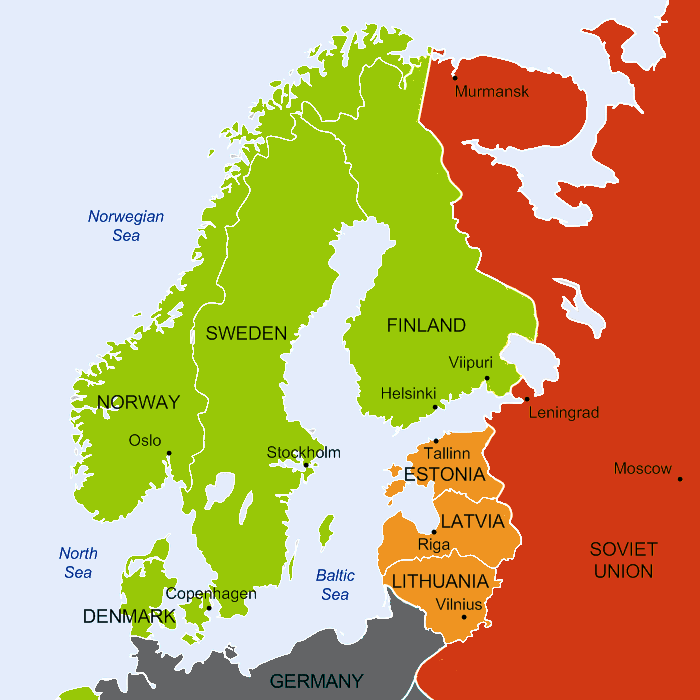
Geopolitical status in Northern Europe in November 1939 Neutral countries Germany and annexed countries Soviet Union and annexed countries Neutral countries with military bases established by Soviet Union in October 1939

The territory of until then independent Republic of Estonia was invaded and occupied by the Soviet Red Army on 16–17 June 1940. Mass political arrests, deportations, and executions by the Soviet regime followed. In the Summer War during the German Operation Barbarossa in 1941, the pro-independence Forest Brothers captured large parts of southern Estonia from the Soviet NKVD troops and the 8th Army before the arrival of the German 18th Army in the area. At the same time, in June–August 1941, Soviet paramilitary destruction battalions carried out punitive operations in Estonia, including looting and killing, based on the tactics of scorched earth ordered by Joseph Stalin. Estonia was occupied by Germany and incorporated into Reichskommissariat Ostland in 1941–1944.

Upon the German invasion of the USSR in 1941, thousands of Estonians were conscripted into the Soviet army (including the Soviet 8th Estonian Rifle Corps and other units), and in 1941–1944 to the German armed forces. A number of Estonian men who had avoided these conscriptions were able to flee to Finland, and many of them then formed the Finnish Infantry Regiment 200. About 40% of the Estonian pre-war fleet was requisitioned by British authorities and used in Atlantic convoys. Approximately 1000 Estonian sailors served in the British Merchant Navy, 200 of them as officers. A small number of Estonians served in the Royal Air Force, in the British Army and in the U.S. Army.

From February to September 1944, the German army detachment "Narwa" held back the Soviet Estonian Operation. After breaching the defence of II Army Corps across the Emajõgi river and clashing with the pro-independence Estonian troops, Soviet forces reoccupied mainland Estonia in September 1944. After the war, Estonia remained incorporated into the Soviet Union as the Estonian SSR until 1991, although the Atlantic Charter stated that no territorial arrangements would be made.

== Preface ==
Before World War II, the Republic of Estonia and the USSR had signed and ratified the following treaties:

- Kellogg-Briand Pact: The 27 August 1928 pact Pact "renounc[ed] war as an instrument of national policy". Ratified by Estonia and the USSR on 24 July 1929.
- Non-aggression treaty with the USSR on 4 May 1932.
- The Convention for the Definition of Aggression: On 3 July 1933, for the first time in the history of international relations, aggression was defined in a binding treaty signed at the Soviet Embassy in London by the USSR and among others, the Republic of Estonia. Article II defined forms of aggression. "There shall be recognized as an aggressor that State which shall be the first to have committed one of the following actions". Relevant chapters: "Second – invasion by armed forces of the territory of another State even without a declaration of war", and "Fourth – a naval blockade of coasts or ports of another State."
- Declaration of neutrality: Estonia, Latvia and Lithuania jointly declared their neutrality on 18 November 1938, in Riga, at the Conference of Baltic Foreign Ministers with their respective parliaments passing neutrality laws later that year. Estonia passed a law ratifying its neutrality on 1 December 1938, which was modelled on Sweden's declaration of neutrality of 29 May 1938. Also importantly, Estonia had asserted its neutrality in its very first constitution, as well as the Treaty of Tartu concluded in 1920 between Republic of Estonia and the Russian SFSR.

== Molotov–Ribbentrop Pact ==
Planned and actual divisions of Europe, according to the Molotov–Ribbentrop Pact, with later adjustments

Early on the morning of 24 August 1939, the Soviet Union and Nazi Germany signed a 10-year non-aggression pact, called the Molotov–Ribbentrop pact. Most notably, the pact contained a secret protocol, revealed only after Germany's defeat in 1945, according to which the states of Northern and Eastern Europe were divided into German and Soviet "spheres of influence". In the north, Finland, Estonia and Latvia were assigned to the Soviet sphere. Poland was to be partitioned in the event of its "political rearrangement"—the areas east of the Narev, Vistula and San Rivers going to the Soviet Union while Germany would occupy the west. Lithuania, adjacent to East Prussia, would be in the German sphere of influence, although a second secret protocol agreed in September 1939 assigned the majority of Lithuania to the USSR.

== The beginning of World War II ==
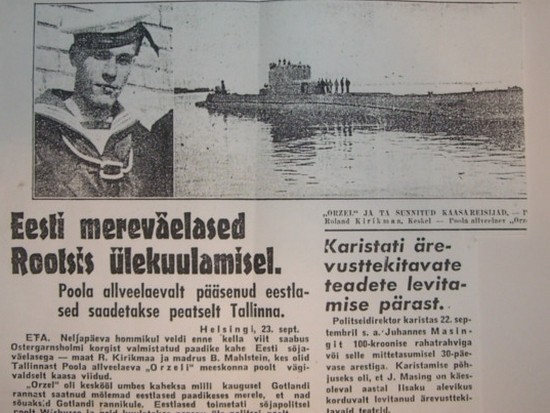
The Orzel incident covered in the Estonian newspaper Uus Eesti (New Estonia).

World War II began with the invasion of Poland, an important regional ally of Estonia, by Germany. Although some coordination existed between Germany and the USSR early in the war, the Soviet Union communicated to Nazi Germany its decision to launch its own invasion seventeen days after Germany's invasion, as a result, in part, of the unforeseen rapidity of the Polish military collapse.

- On 1 September 1939, Germany invaded its part of Poland under the Molotov–Ribbentrop Pact.
- 3 September, Great Britain, France, Australia, and New Zealand declare war on Germany.
- 14 September, the Polish submarine ORP Orzeł reached Tallinn, Estonia.
- On 17 September, the Soviet Union invaded its part of Poland under the Molotov–Ribbentrop Pact's secret protocol. During this invasion, a close coordination of German and Soviet military activity took place.
- 18 September, Orzeł incident; the Polish submarine escaped from internment in Tallinn and eventually made her way to the United Kingdom; Estonia's neutrality questioned by the Soviet Union and Germany.

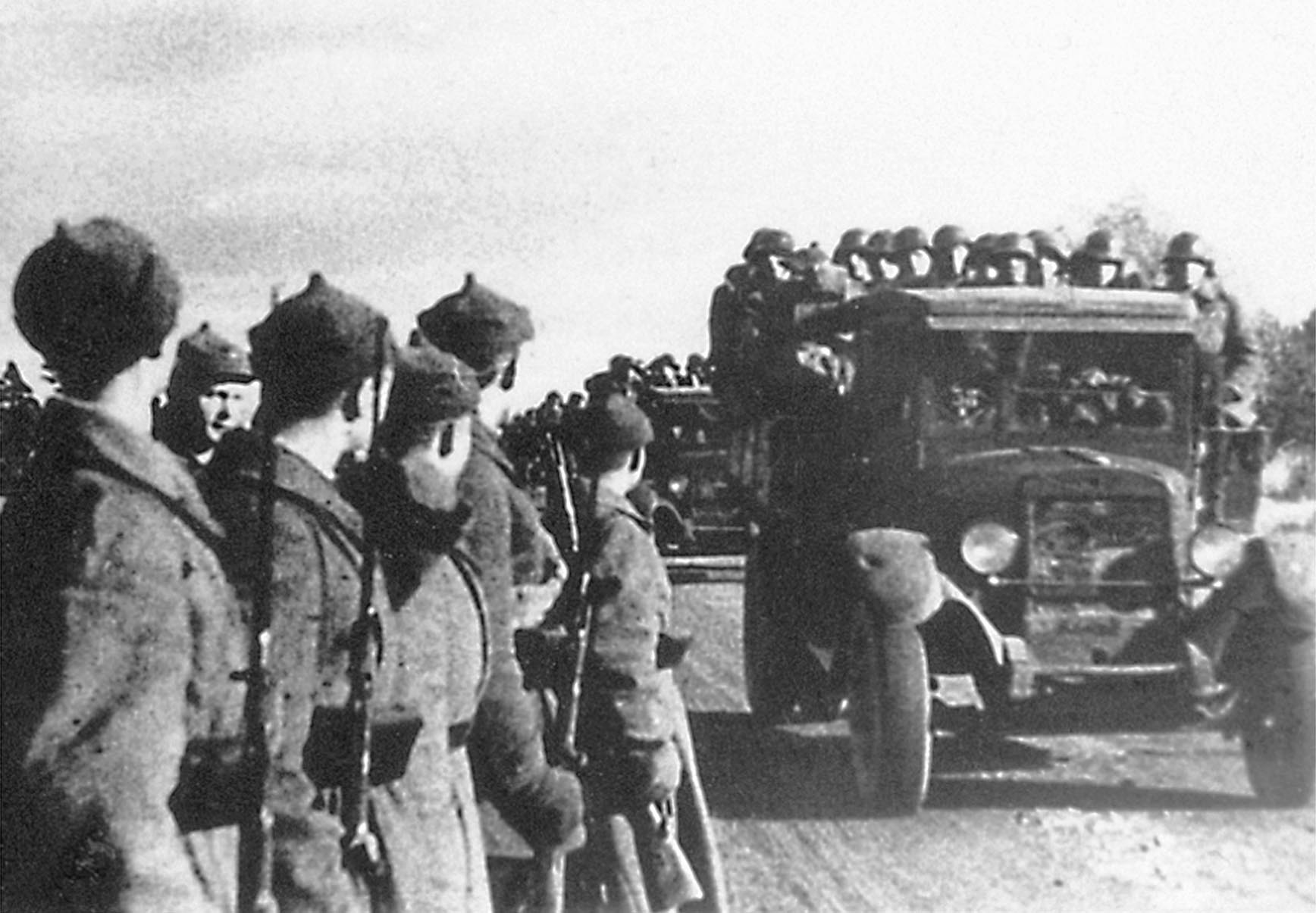
The Red Army entering Estonia in 1939 after Estonia had been forced to sign the Bases Treaty

On 24 September 1939, with the fall of Poland to Nazi Germany and the USSR imminent and in light of the Orzeł incident, the Moscow press and radio started violently attacking Estonia as "hostile" to the Soviet Union. Warships of the Red Navy appeared off Estonian ports, and Soviet bombers began a threatening patrol over Tallinn and the nearby countryside. Moscow demanded that Estonia allow the USSR to establish military bases and station 25,000 troops on Estonian soil for the duration of the European war. The government of Estonia accepted the ultimatum signing the corresponding agreement on 28 September 1939.

The pact was made for ten years:

1. Estonia granted the USSR the right to maintain naval bases and airfields protected by Red Army troops on the strategic islands dominating Tallinn, the Gulf of Finland and the Gulf of Riga;
2. The Soviet Union agreed to increase her annual trade turnover with Estonia and to give Estonia facilities in case the Baltic is closed to her goods for trading with the outside world via Soviet ports on the Black Sea and White Sea;
3. The USSR and Estonia undertook to defend each other from "aggression arising on the part of any great European power";
4. It was declared: the pact "should not affect" the "economic systems and state organizations" of the USSR and Estonia.

There is no consensus in Estonian society about the decisions that the leadership of the Republic of Estonia made at that time.

When Soviet troops marched into Estonia the guns of both nations gave mutual salutes, and bands played both the Estonian anthem and the Internationale, the anthem of the USSR, at the time.

Similar demands were forwarded to Finland, Latvia and Lithuania. Finland resisted, and was attacked by the Soviet Union on 30 November, launching the Winter War. Because the attack was judged as illegal, the Soviet Union was expelled from the League of Nations on 14 December. The war ended with the signing of the Moscow Peace Treaty in March 1940, in which Finland ceded 9% of its territory to the Soviet Union. However, the Soviets' attempt to install their Finnish Democratic Republic puppet government into Helsinki and annex Finland into the Soviet Union had failed.

The first population loss for Estonia was the repatriation of about 12,000–18,000 Baltic Germans to Germany.

== Soviet occupation ==
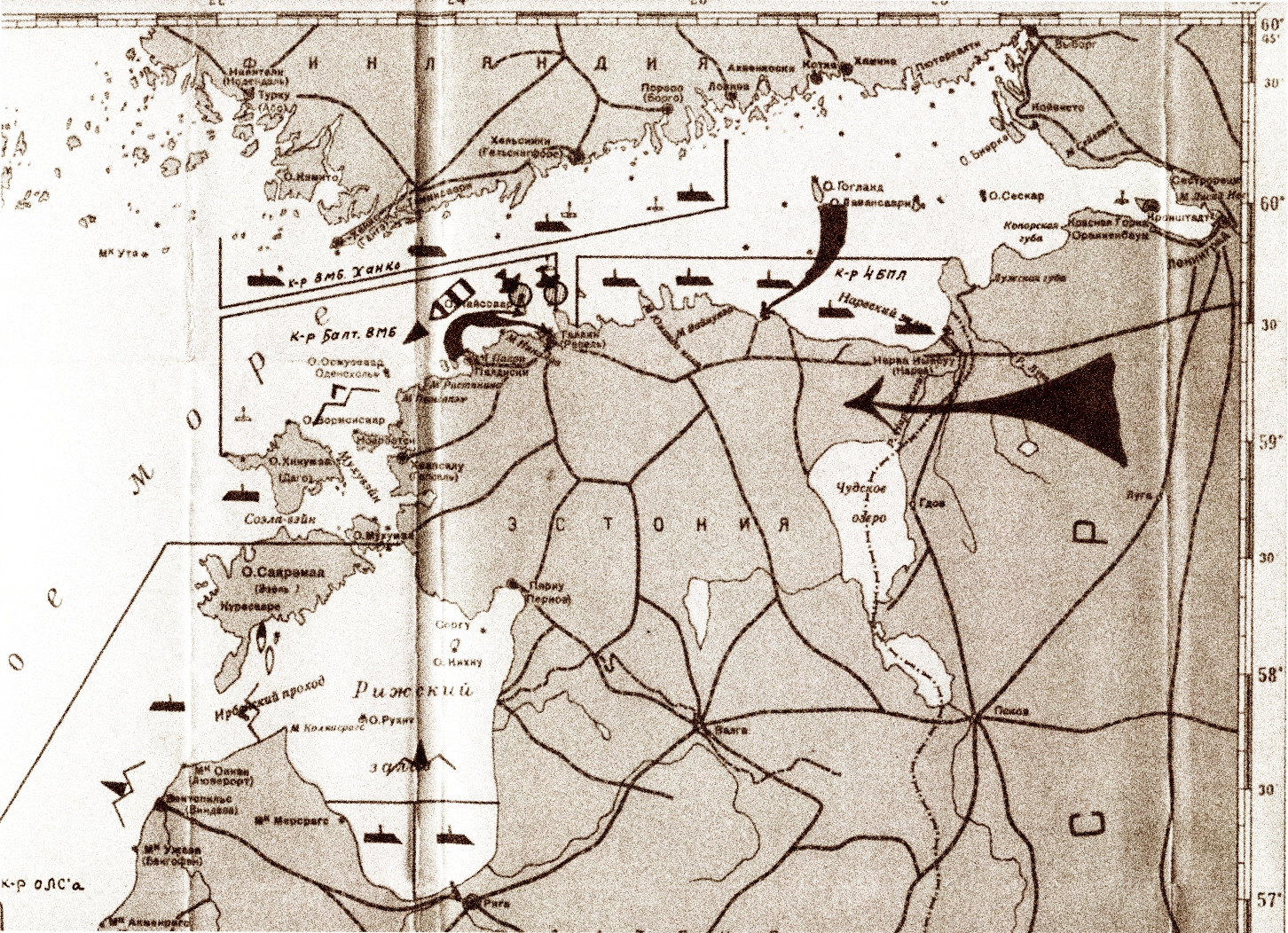
Schematics of the Soviet military blockade and invasion of Estonia in 1940. (Russian State Naval Archives)

In the summer of 1940 the occupation of Estonia was carried through as a regular military operation. 160,000 men, supported by 600 tanks were concentrated for the invasion into Estonia. 5 divisions of the Soviet Air Force with 1150 aircraft blockaded the whole Baltic air space against Estonia, Lithuania and Latvia. The Soviet Baltic Fleet blockaded the operation from the sea. The Soviet NKVD was ordered to be ready for the reception of 58,000 prisoners of war.

On 3 June 1940, all Soviet military forces based in the Baltic states were concentrated under the command of Aleksandr Loktionov.

On 9 June, the directive 02622ss/ov was given to the Red Army's Leningrad Military District by Semyon Timoshenko to be ready by 12 June to (a) Capture the vessels of the Estonian, Latvian and Lithuanian Navy in their bases and/or at sea; (b) Capture the Estonian and Latvian commercial fleet and all other vessels; (c) Prepare for an invasion and landing in Tallinn and Paldiski; (d) Close the Gulf of Riga and blockade the coasts of Estonia and Latvia in Gulf of Finland and Baltic Sea; (e) Prevent an evacuation of the Estonian and Latvian governments, military forces and assets; (f) Provide naval support for an invasion towards Rakvere; (g) Prevent Estonian and Latvian airplanes from flying either to Finland or Sweden.

On 12 June 1940, the order for a total military blockade on Estonia was given to the Soviet Baltic Fleet, according to the director of the Russian State Archive of the Naval Department Pavel Petrov (C.Phil.) referring to the records in the archive.

On 13 June at 10:40 am the Soviet forces started to move to their positions and were ready by 14 June at 10 pm. (a) 4 submarines and a number of light navy units were positioned in the Baltic Sea, to the gulfs of Riga and Finland to isolate the Baltic states by sea. (b) A navy squadron including three destroyer divisions were positioned to the west of Naissaar in order to support the invasion. (c) The 1st marine brigade's four battalions on transportation ships Sibir, 2nd Pjatiletka and Elton were positioned for landing and invasion of Naissaare and Aegna; (d) Transportation ship Dnester and destroyers Storozevoi and Silnoi were positioned with troops for the invasion of the capital Tallinn; (e) the 50th battalion was positioned on ships for an invasion near Kunda. In the naval blockade participated in total 120 Soviet vessels including 1 cruiser, 7 destroyers, and 17 submarines; 219 airplanes including the 8th air-brigade with 84 bombers: DB-3 and Tupolev SB and the 10th brigade with 62 airplanes.

On 14 June while the world's attention was focused on the fall of Paris to Nazi Germany a day earlier, the Soviet military blockade on Estonia went into effect. Two Soviet bombers downed a Finnish passenger airplane "Kaleva" flying from Tallinn to Helsinki carrying three diplomatic pouches from the U.S. legations in Tallinn, Riga and Helsinki and over 120 kilograms of diplomatic mail by two French embassy couriers. The US Foreign Service employee Henry W. Antheil Jr., the French couriers and other passengers were killed in the crash.

Vyacheslav Molotov had accused the Baltic states of conspiracy against the Soviet Union and delivered an ultimatum to Estonia for the establishment of a government the Soviets approve of. The Estonian government decided according to the Kellogg-Briand Pact not to use war as an instrument of national policy. On 17 June 1940, the Soviet Union invaded Estonia. The Red Army exited from their military bases in Estonia, some 90,000 additional Soviet troops entered the country. Given the overwhelming Soviet force both on the borders and inside the country, not to resist, to avoid bloodshed and open war.

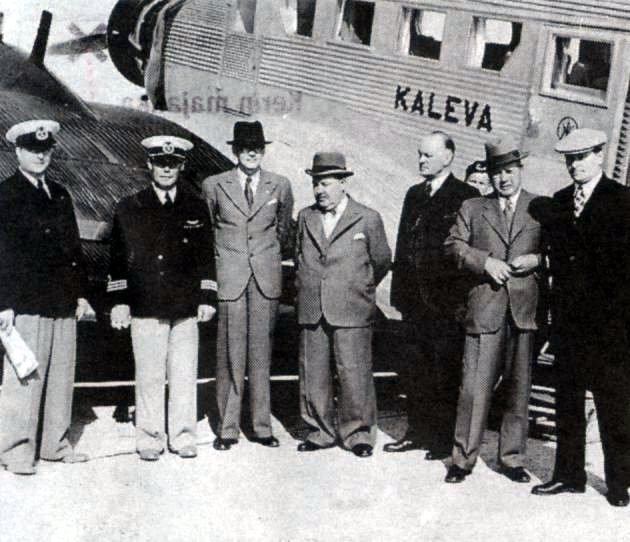
Kaleva airplane and its crew before the incident

On 17 June, the day France surrendered to Germany. The military occupation of the Republic of Estonia was complete by 21 June 1940, and rendered "official" by a communist coup d'état supported by the Soviet troops.

Most of the Estonian Defence Forces and the Estonian Defence League surrendered according to the orders of the Estonian Government believing that resistance was useless and were disarmed by the Red Army. (Note: June 14 the Estonian government surrendered without offering any military resistance; The occupation authorities began ... by disarming the Estonian Army and removing the higher military common from power) Only the Estonian Independent Signal Battalion stationed in Tallinn at Raua Street showed resistance to Red Army, along with a Communist militia called "People's Self-Defence", (Estonian: Rahva Omakaitse) on 21 June 1940. As the Red Army brought in additional reinforcements supported by six armoured fighting vehicles, the battle lasted several hours until sundown. Finally the military resistance was ended with negotiations and the Independent Signal Battalion surrendered and was disarmed. There were 2 dead Estonian servicemen, Aleksei Männikus and Johannes Mandre, and several wounded on the Estonian side and about 10 killed and more wounded on the Soviet side. On the same day, 21 June 1940, the Flag of Estonia was replaced with a Red flag on Pikk Hermann tower, the symbol of the government in force in Estonia.

On 14–15 July, rigged and likely fabricated elections were held in which only Soviet-supported candidates were permitted to run. Those who failed to have their passports stamped for voting for a communist candidate risked getting shot in the back of the head. Tribunals were set up to punish "traitors to the people", those who had fallen short of the "political duty" of voting Estonia into the USSR. The "parliament" so elected proclaimed Estonia a socialist republic on 21 July 1940, and unanimously requested Estonia to be "accepted" into the Soviet Union. The Soviet Union annexed Estonia on 6 August and renamed the Estonian Soviet Socialist Republic. The 1940 occupation and annexation of Estonia into the Soviet Union was considered illegal and never officially recognized by Great Britain, the United States and other Western democracies. The annexation abrogated numerous prior treaties entered into by the Soviet Union and its predecessor, Bolshevist Russia.

=== Soviet terror ===
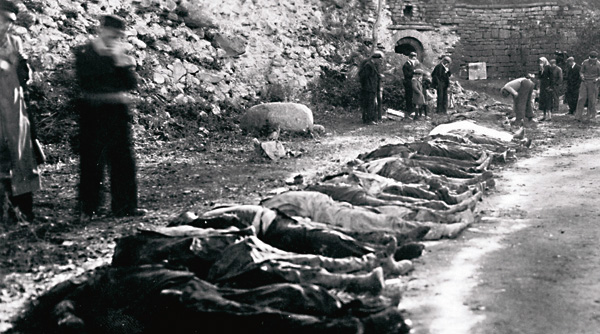
Claimed that these people were massacred by USSR during period from June to September 1941 in Kuressaare, Estonia. The source states: "No culprits found".

Having seized control over Estonia, the Soviet authorities rapidly moved to stamp out any potential opposition to their rule. During the first year of the occupation (1940–1941) over 8,000 people, including most of the country's leading politicians and military officers, were arrested. About 2,200 of them were executed in Estonia, while the rest were removed to prison camps in Russia, from whence very few returned alive. On 19 July 1940, the Commander-in-chief of the Estonian Army Johan Laidoner was captured by the NKVD and deported together with his spouse to the town of Penza. Laidoner died in the Vladimir Prison Camp, Russia on 13 March 1953. President of Estonia, Konstantin Päts was arrested and deported by the Soviets to Ufa in Russia on 30 July; he died in a psychiatric hospital at Kalinin (currently Tver), Russia in 1956. In all about 800 Estonian officers were arrested, about half of whom were executed, arrested or starved to death in prison camps.

When Estonia was proclaimed a Soviet Republic (SSR), the crews of 42 Estonian ships in foreign waters refused to return to their homeland (about 40% of the pre-war Estonian fleet). These ships were requisitioned by the British powers and were used in Atlantic convoys. During the war, approximately 1000 Estonian seamen served in the British merchant marine, 200 of them as officers. A small number of Estonians served in the Royal Air Force, in the British Army and in the US Army, altogether no more than two hundred.

=== Soviet repression of Russian emigres ===
Immediately after the Soviet takeover, local Russian institutions (societies, newspapers etc.) were closed down. The cultural life that had developed during Estonia's independence was destroyed. Almost all of the leading Russian emigres were arrested and later executed.

Some of the Russian White emigres had already been arrested before 21 June 1940 by the Estonian political police, probably in order to avoid "provocations" during the Red Army's invasion, and those arrested were consequently handed over to the NKVD torture chambers after the Communist takeover.

== Summer War ==
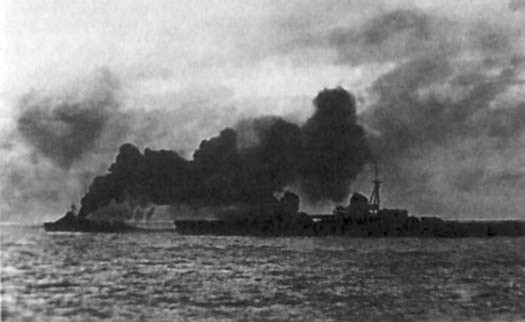
Soviet cruiser Kirov protected by smoke during evacuation of Tallinn in August 1941.

On 22 June 1941, Nazi Germany launched their invasion of the Soviet Union. On 3 July, Joseph Stalin made his public statement over the radio calling for a scorched earth policy in the areas to be abandoned. In North Estonia, the Soviet destruction battalions had the greatest impact, being the last Baltic territory captured by the Germans. Pro-independence Forest Brothers, numbering 12,000, attacked the forces of the NKVD and the 8th Army (Major General Ljubovtsev). The fight against Forest Brothers and the implementation of the scorched earth tactics were accompanied by terror against the civilian population, which was treated as supporters or shelterers of the insurgents. Destruction battalions burnt down farms and some small boroughs. In turn, the members of the extermination battalions were at risk of reprisals by the anti-Soviet partisans.

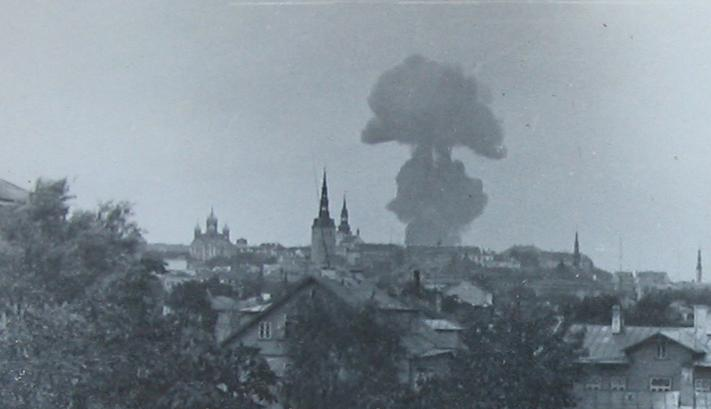
Battles on the outskirts of Tallinn in August 1941.

Thousands of people including a large proportion of women and children were killed, while dozens of villages, schools and public buildings were burned to the ground. In August 1941, all residents of the village of Viru-Kabala were killed including a two-year-old child and a six-day-old infant. In the Kautla massacre, twenty people, all civilians, were murdered — many of them after torture — and tens of farms destroyed. The low toll of human deaths in comparison with the number of burned farms is due to the Erna long-range reconnaissance group breaking the Red Army blockade on the area, allowing many civilians to escape. Occasionally, the battalions burned people alive. The destruction battalions murdered 1,850 people in Estonia. Almost all of them were partisans or unarmed civilians.

On 8 August 1941, Soviet Naval Aviation used an abandoned air field on Saaremaa to launch a bombing campaign on Berlin in response of German air raids on Moscow during Operation Barbarossa.

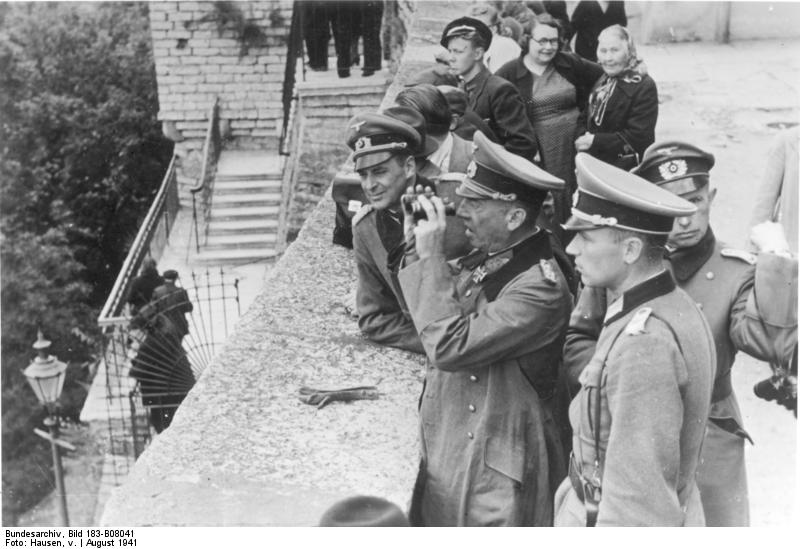
German general Georg von Küchler in Tallinn in August 1941.

After the German 18th Army crossed the Estonian southern border on 7–9 July, the Forest Brothers organized themselves into bigger units. They took on the 8th Army units and destruction battalions at Antsla on 5 July 1941. The next day, a larger offensive happened in Vastseliina where the Forest Brothers prevented Soviet destruction of the town and trapped the extermination battalion chiefs and local communist administrators. On 7 July, the Forest Brothers were able to hoist the Estonian flag in Vasteliina. Võru was subsequently liberated and by the time the 18th army arrived, the blue-black-white flags were already at full mast and the Forest Brothers had organised into the Omakaitse militia.

The battle of Tartu lasted for two weeks and destroyed a large part of the city. Under the leadership of Friedrich Kurg, the Forest Brothers drove the Soviets out of Tartu, behind the Pärnu River – Emajõgi line and secured southern Estonia under Estonian control by 10 July. The NKVD murdered 193 people in Tartu Prison on their retreat on 8 July.

The 18th Army resumed their advance in Estonia by working in cooperation with the Forest Brothers. The joint Estonian-German forces took Narva on 17 August. By the end of August, Tallinn was surrounded, while in the harbor was the majority of the Baltic Fleet. On 19 August, the final German assault on Tallinn began. The joint Estonian-German forces took the Estonian capital on 28 August. The Soviet evacuation of Tallinn carried heavy losses. On that day, the Red flag shot down earlier on Pikk Hermann was replaced with the flag of Estonia. After the Soviets were driven out from Estonia, German troops disarmed all the Forest Brother groups. The Estonian flag was replaced shortly with the flag of Germany.

On 8 September, German and Estonian units launched Operation Beowulf to clear Soviet forces from the West Estonian archipelago. There were a series of diversionary attacks to confuse the Soviet defenders. The operation had achieved its objectives by 21 October.

=== Damages ===
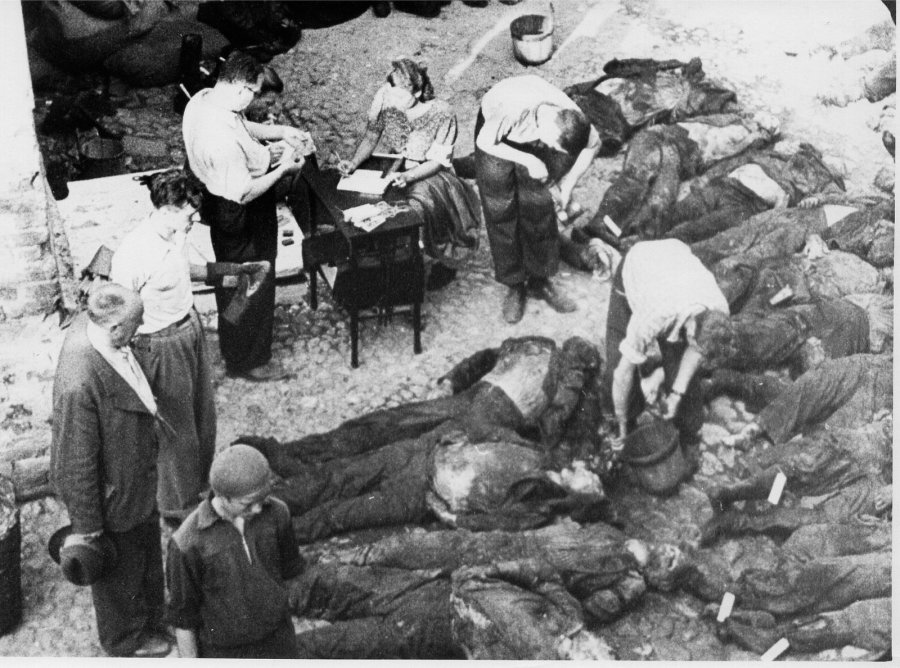
Victims of NKVD in Tartu, Estonia, July 1941.

2,199 people were killed by the Soviet state security agencies, the destruction battalions, the Red Army and the Baltic Fleet, among them 264 women and 82 minors. Grave damage was caused to the Estonian Co-operative Wholesale Society, the Estonian Meat Export Company and the Central Association of Co-operative Dairies. 3,237 farms were destroyed. Altogether, 13,500 buildings were destroyed. The data of the 1939 livestock and fowl differed from the 1942 by the following numbers: there were 30,600 (14%) fewer horses, 239,800 (34%) fewer dairy cattle, 223,600 (50%) fewer pigs, 320,000 (46%) fewer sheep, and 470,000 (27.5%) fewer fowl. The following equipment was evacuated to the Soviet Union: those of the Tallinn Engineering Works "Red Krull", radio factory "Radio Pioneer", and the Northern Pulp and Paper Mills. The dismantling of the oil shale industry also began. Additionally raw materials, semi-manufactured products and finished production were evacuated. Altogether, 36,849 Rbls worth of industrial equipment, 362,721 Rbls worth of means of transport, 82,913 Rbls worth of finished products and 94,315 Rbls worth of materials were carried out. Added to the inventory, semi-manufactured products and foodstuff, a total of 606,632 Rbls worth of assets were evacuated.

In the fires of 12 and 13 July, the headquarters of the Estonian Defence League, the campus of the Faculty of Veterinary and Agriculture of the University of Tartu and more university buildings were burnt down. Several libraries of the university and 135 major private libraries were destroyed, totalling 465,000 books, many archive materials and 2,500 pieces of art lost. Among them were the libraries of Aino and Gustav Suits and Aurora and Johannes Semper.

== German occupation ==
Most Estonians greeted the Germans with relatively open arms and hoped for restoration of independence. In Southern Estonia pro-independence administrations were set up, led by Jüri Uluots, and a co-ordinating council was set up in Tartu as soon as the Soviet regime retreated and before German troops arrived. (Note: In some areas of southern Estonia, pro-independence administrations were already in place by the time German troops arrived. Jüri Uluots set up a co-ordinating council in Tartu, yet stopped short of declaring a provisional government.) The Forest Brothers who drove the Red Army from Tartu made this possible. (Note: Often the guerrillas were able to liberate towns before the Germans arrived ... The relative slowness of the German advance allowed about 12,000 Estonian "Forest Brothers" to organize in small local units. The Forest Brothers attacked Soviet garrisons, forcing part of the Red Army to retreat into Latvia, liberating towns and villages and occupying key installations.) This was all for nothing since the Germans disbanded the provisional government and Estonia became a part of the German-occupied Reichskommissariat Ostland. A Sicherheitspolizei was established for internal security under the leadership of Ain-Ervin Mere.

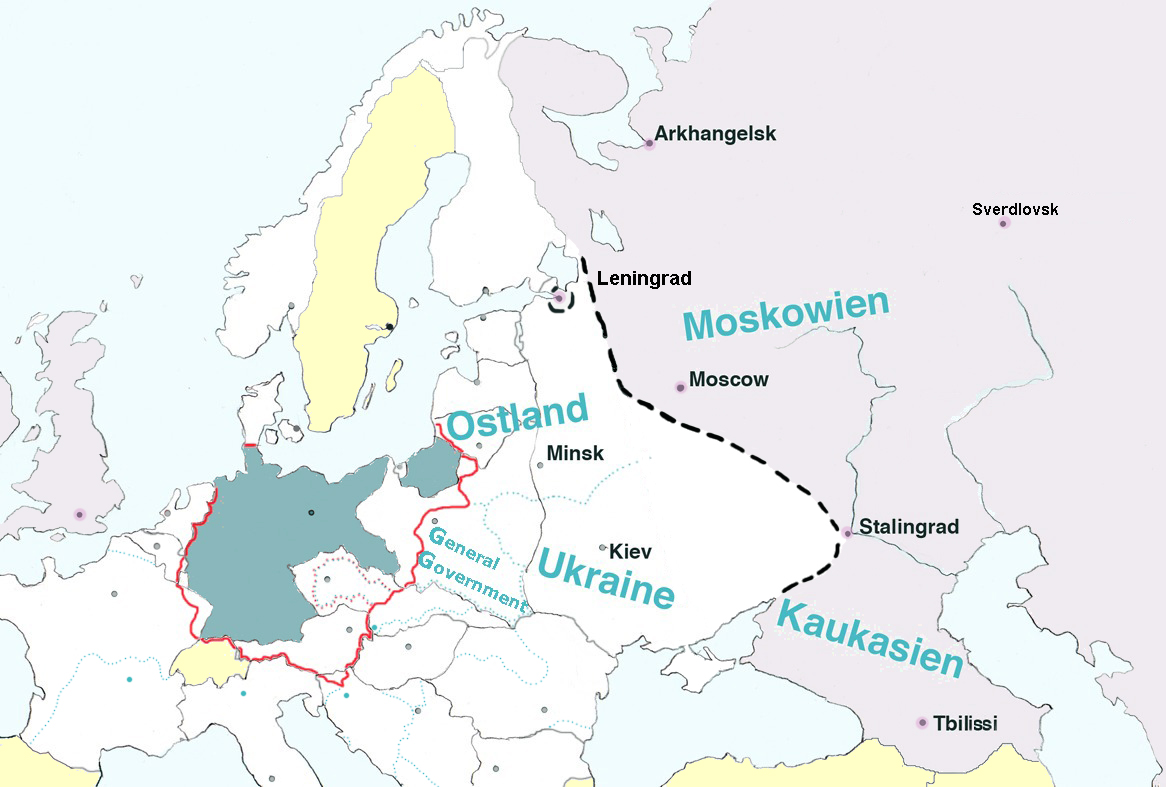
Europe, with pre-war borders, showing the extension of the Generalplan Ost master plan.

In April 1941, on the eve on the German invasion, Alfred Rosenberg, Reich minister for the Occupied Eastern territories, a Baltic German, born and raised in Tallinn, Estonia, laid out his plans for the East. According to Rosenberg a future policy was created:

1. Germanization (Eindeutschung) of the "racially suitable" elements.
2. Colonization by Germanic peoples.
3. Exile, deportations of undesirable elements.

Rosenberg felt that the "Estonians were the most Germanic out of the people living in the Baltic area, having already reached 50 percent of Germanization through Danish, Swedish and German influence". Non-suitable Estonians were to be moved to a region that Rosenberg called "Peipusland" to make room for German colonists. The removal of 50% of Estonians was in accordance with the Generalplan Ost, however the plan did not envisage just their relocation, the majority would be worked and starved to death.

The initial enthusiasm that accompanied the liberation from Soviet occupation quickly waned as a result and the Germans had limited success in recruiting volunteers. The draft was introduced in 1942, resulting in some 3400 men fleeing to Finland to fight in the Finnish Army rather than join the Germans. Finnish Infantry Regiment 200 (Estonian: soomepoisid) was formed out of Estonian volunteers who had fled the 1943–1944 forced mobilization into the German forces in Estonia. The unit fought the Red Army on the Karelian Front. In June 1942, political leaders of Estonia who had survived Soviet repressions held a meeting hidden from the occupying powers in Estonia where the formation of an underground Estonian government and the options for preserving continuity of the republic were discussed. On 6 January 1943, a meeting was held at the Estonian foreign delegation in Stockholm. In order to preserve the legal continuation of the Republic of Estonia, it was decided that the last constitutional prime minister, Jüri Uluots, had to continue to fulfill his responsibilities as prime minister. In June 1944, the elector's assembly of the Republic of Estonia gathered in secrecy from the occupying powers in Tallinn and appointed Jüri Uluots as the prime minister with responsibilities of the President. On 21 June Jüri Uluots appointed Otto Tief as deputy prime minister. With the Allied victory over Germany becoming certain in 1944, the only option to save Estonia's independence was to stave off a new Soviet invasion of Estonia until Germany's capitulation. By supporting the German conscription call Uluots hoped to restore the Estonian Army and the country's independence. (Note: In Estonia, the pre-war Prime minister Uluots switched his stand on mobilization in February 1944 when the Soviet Army reached the Estonian border. At the time the Estonian units under German control had about 14,000 men. Counting on a German debacle, Uluots considered it imperative to have large numbers of Estonians armed, through any means. ... Uluots even managed to tell it to the nation through the German-controlled radio: Estonian troops on Estonian soil have "a significance much wider than what I could and would be able to disclose here". The nation understood and responded: 38,000 registered. Six border-defense regiments were formed, headed by Estonian officers, and the SS Division received reinforcements, bringing the total of Estonian units up to 50,000 or 60,000 men. During the whole period at least 70,000 Estonians joined the German army, and more than 10,000 may have died in action. About 10,000 reached the West after the war ended.)

=== The Holocaust ===
The first records of Jews in Estonia date back to the 14th century. The permanent Jewish settlement in Estonia began in the nineteenth century, when in 1865 the Russian Tsar Alexander II granted Jews with university degrees and merchants of the third guild the right to enter the region. (Note: Alexander II permitted Jews with university degrees and merchants of the third guild to settle anywhere in Russia, and several hundred settled in Estonia.)

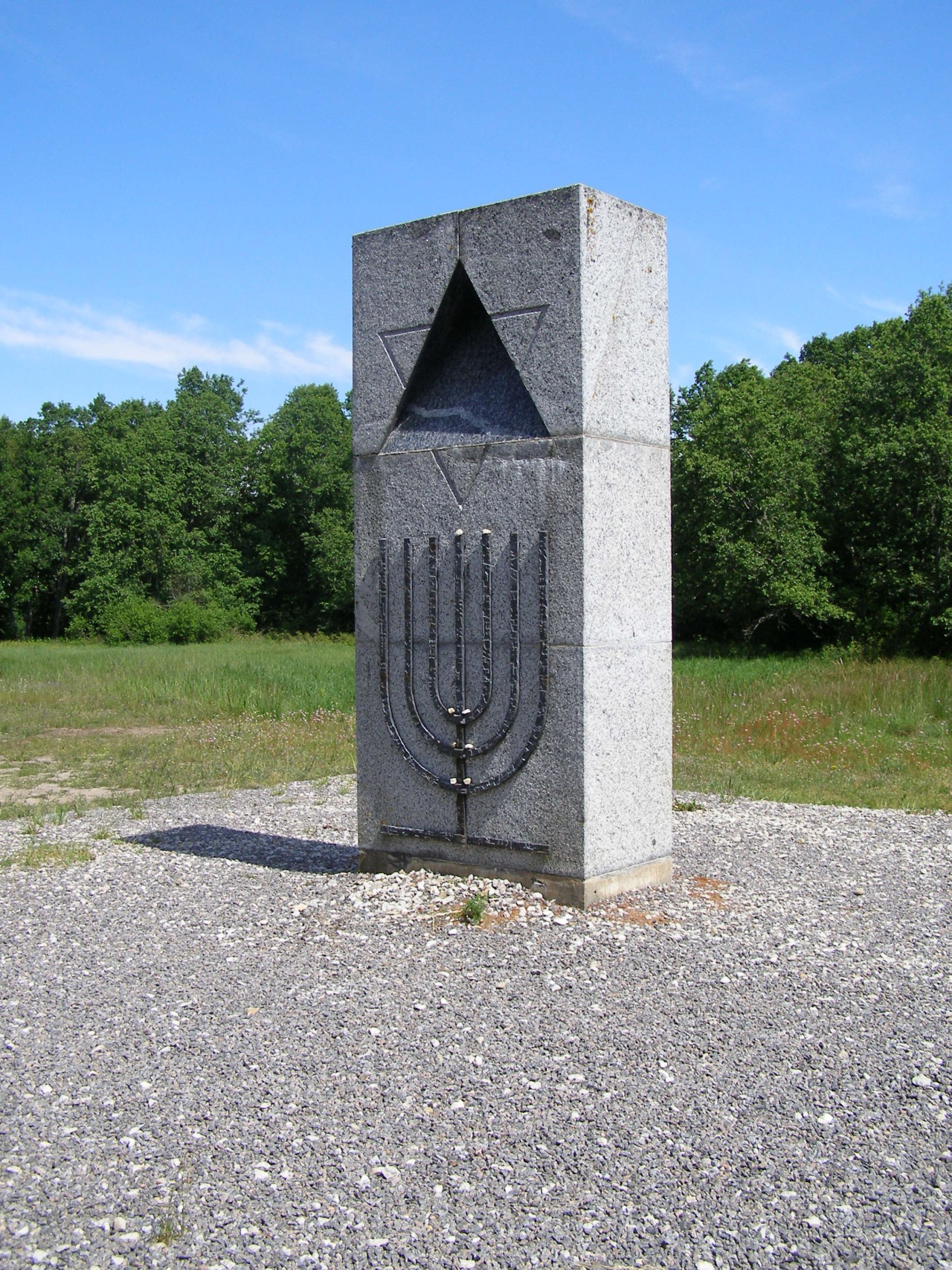
Holocaust memorial at the site of the former Klooga concentration camp, opened on 24 July 2005

The creation of the Republic of Estonia in 1918 marked the beginning of a new era for the Jews. Approximately 200 Jews fought in combat for the creation of the Republic of Estonia and 70 of these men were volunteers. On 12 February 1925 the Estonian government passed a law unique in inter-war Europe pertaining to the cultural autonomy of ethnic minorities. (Note: The Estonian Cultural Autonomy Law of 1925 was unique in inter-war Europe, and elicited much attention internationally. Under its terms, representatives of Estonia's Russian, German, and Swedish minorities (and other nationality groups numbering at least 3,000) were given the possibility of establishing their own cultural self-governments.) The Jewish community quickly prepared its application for cultural autonomy. Statistics on Jewish citizens were compiled. They totaled 3045, fulfilling the minimum requirement of 3000. In June 1926 the Jewish Cultural Council was elected and Jewish cultural autonomy was declared. Jewish cultural autonomy was of great interest to the global Jewish community. The Jewish National Endowment presented the Government of the Republic of Estonia with a certificate of gratitude for this achievement.

There were, at the time of the Soviet occupation in 1940, approximately 4000 Estonian Jews. Many Jewish people were deported to Siberia along with other Estonians by the Soviets. It is estimated that 500 Jews suffered this fate.

The Jewish community was amongst the first to be rounded up in accordance with the Generalplan Ost which required the removal of 50% of Estonian citizens. With the invasion of the Baltics, it was the intention of the Nazi government to use the Baltic countries as their main area of mass genocide.

Consequently, Jews from countries outside the Baltics were shipped there to be exterminated. Out of the approximately 4,300 Jews in Estonia before the war, between 950 and 1,000 were entrapped by the Nazis. An estimated 10,000 Jews were killed in Estonia after having been deported to camps there from elsewhere in Eastern Europe. There have been 7 known ethnic Estonians—Ralf Gerrets, Ain-Ervin Mere, Jaan Viik, Juhan Jüriste, Karl Linnas, Aleksander Laak, and Ervin Viks—who have faced trials for crimes against humanity. Since the reestablishment of Estonian independence, the Estonian International Commission for Investigation of Crimes Against Humanity has been established. Markers were put in place for the 60th anniversary of the mass executions that were carried out at the Lagedi, Vaivara and Klooga (Kalevi-Liiva) camps in September 1944.

In May 2005, Estonian Prime Minister Andrus Ansip gave a speech while visiting Klooga:

"Although these murderers must answer for their crimes as individuals, the Estonian Government continues to do everything possible to expose these crimes. I apologise for the fact that Estonian citizens could be found among those who participated in the murdering of people or assisted in the perpetration of these crimes."

Estonia (together with Austria, Lithuania, Norway, Romania, Sweden, Syria and Ukraine) has been given the grade Category F: "Total Failure" ("countries, which refuse in principle to investigate, let alone prosecute, suspected Nazi war criminals") by the Simon Wiesenthal Center Status Report on Investigation and Prosecution of Nazi War Criminals for 2006.

== Estonian combat and security units in 1941–1945 ==
=== Estonian units in German forces ===
Resistance groups of the Summer War were organised by Germans in August 1941 into the Omakaitse (lit. 'Self-defence'), which had between 34,000 and 40,000 members, mainly based on the Kaitseliit, dissolved by the Soviets. Omakaitse was in charge of clearing the German army's rear of Red Army soldiers, NKVD members, and Communist activists. Within a year its members killed 5,500 Estonian residents. Later, they performed guard duty and fought Soviet partisans flown into Estonia. From among Omakaitse members were recruited Estonian policemen, members of the Estonian Auxiliary Police and officers of the Estonian 20th Waffen-SS Division.

Immediately after entering Estonia, the Germans began forming volunteer Estonian units the size of a battalion. By January 1942, six Security Groups (battalions No. 181-186, about 4,000 men) had been formed and were subordinate to the Wehrmacht 18th Army. After the one-year contract expired, some volunteers transferred to the Waffen-SS or returned to civilian life, and three Eastern Battalions (No. 658-660) were formed from those who remained. They operated in the rear of the 18th Army until early 1944, after which their members transferred to the 20th Waffen-SS Division.

Beginning in September 1941, the SS and police command created four Infantry Defence Battalions (No. 37-40) and a reserve and sapper battalion (No. 41-42), which were operationally subordinate to the Wehrmacht. They were attached to Wehrmacht's security divisions and operated in the Army Group North Rear Area. From 1943 they were called Police Battalions, with 3,000 serving in them. In 1944 they were transformed into two infantry battalions and evacuated to Germany in the fall of 1944, where they were incorporated into the 20th Waffen-SS Division.

In the fall of 1941, the Germans also formed eight police battalions (No. 29-36), of which only 36th Estonian Police Battalion was created with a combat purpose in mind. However, due to shortages, most of them were sent to the front near Leningrad, and were mostly disbanded in 1943. That same year, the SS and police command created five new Security and Defense Battalions (they inherited No. 29-33 and had more than 2,600 men). In the spring of 1943, five Defence Battalions (No. 286-290) were established as compulsory military service units. The 290th Battalion consisted of Estonian Russians. Battalions No. 286, 288 and 289 were used to rear security and reprisals in Belarus.

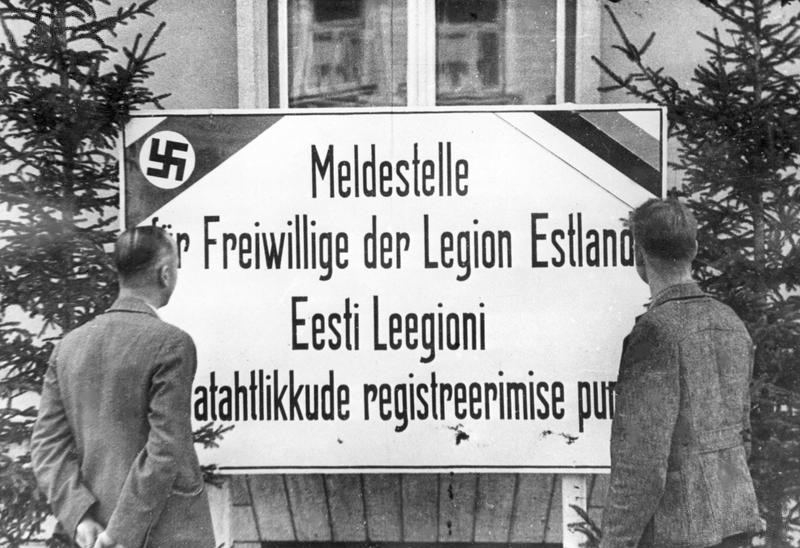
The recruiting center for the Waffen-SS Estonian Legion

On 28 Aug. 1942, the Germans formed the volunteer Waffen-SS Estonian Legion. Of the approximately 1,000 volunteers, 800 were incorporated into Battalion Narva and sent to Ukraine in the spring of 1943. Due to the shrinking number of volunteers, in February 1943 the Germans introduced compulsory conscription in Estonia. Born between 1919 and 1924 faced the choice of going to work in Germany, joining the Waffen-SS or Estonian auxiliary battalions. 5,000 joined the Estonian Waffen-SS Legion, which was reorganized into the 3rd Estonian Waffen-SS Brigade.

As the Red Army advanced, a general mobilization was announced, officially supported by Estonia's last Prime Minister Jüri Uluots. By April 1944, 38,000 Estonians had been drafted. Some went into the 3rd Waffen-SS Brigade, which was enlarged to division size (20th Waffen-SS Division: 10 battalions, more than 15,000 men in the summer of 1944) and also incorporated most of the already existing Estonian units (mostly Eastern Battalions). Younger men were conscripted into other Waffen-SS units. From the rest, six Border Defense Regiments and four Police Fusilier Battalions (Nos. 286, 288, 291, and 292).

The Estonian Security Police and SD, the 286th, 287th and 288th Estonian Auxiliary Police battalions, and 2.5–3% of the Estonian Omakaitse (Home Guard) militia units (between 1,000 and 1,200 men) took part in rounding up, guarding or killing of 400–1,000 Roma and 6,000 Jews in concentration camps in the Pskov region of Russia and the Jägala, Vaivara, Klooga and Lagedi concentration camps in Estonia. Guarded by these units, 15,000 Soviet POWs died in Estonia: some through neglect and mistreatment and some by execution.

=== Estonian Rifle Corps in the Red Army ===
In June 1940, while the Estonian army was integrated into the Soviet military structure, where in June 1940 there were 16,800 men, it was changed into the "22nd Territorial Rifle Corps". 5,500 Estonian soldiers served in the corps during the first battle. 4,500 of them went over to the German side. In September 1941, when the corps was liquidated, there were still 500 previous Estonian soldiers. (Note: The Estonian Army, where in June 1940 there were 16,800 men, was changed into the "22nd Territorial Rifle Corps", which was totally russified at the beginning of the war (only 9,000 previous Estonian soldiers stayed compared to 20,000 Russians). Thousands of men escaped from the corps when sent to Russia at the outbreak of the war. 5,500 Estonian soldiers served in the corps during the first battle. 4,500 of them went over to the German side. In September 1941, when the corps was liquidated, there were still 500 previous Estonian soldiers.)

Having mobilized some 33,000 Estonians as the Soviets were evacuating in the summer of 1941, no more than half of those men were used for military service; the rest perished in Gulag concentration camps and labour battalions, mainly in the early months of the war. (Note: During the German attack in June 1941 all three Territorial Corps suffered mass desertions to the Germans; The Soviet High Command transferred them deep into Russia before disbanding them at the end of 1941, and hundreds of officers subsequently died in Gulag labour-camps while the other ranks were transferred to military labour duties. Last-minute Soviet attempts to mobilise Baltic civilians were largely unsuccessful.)

Estonian military units within the Red Army began to be formed in January 1942, from among ethnic Estonians living in the USSR. A Soviet source suggests that in May 1942 there were nearly 20,000 Estonians in the national units. The 8th Estonian Rifle Corps, as these units came to be called after September 1942, reached the front in Velikie Luki in December 1942 and suffered heavy losses in battle as well as the defection of about 1,000 men to the German side. After Velikie Luki the Rifle Corps was replaced with other nationalities from the USSR. The corps' major activity in the latter part of the war was participation in the battles for Estonia.

== Battles in 1944 ==
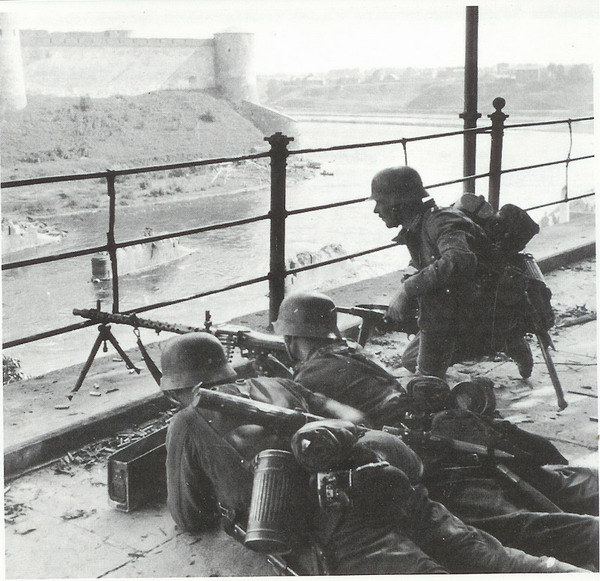
Soldiers defending the Estonian bank of the Narva River, with the fortress of Ivangorod on the opposite side.

In January 1944, the Soviet Leningrad Front (the Soviet army group in the region of Leningrad) forced the Sponheimer Group back to the former Estonian border. On 31 January, the Self-Administration (puppet government of Estonia) announced a general conscription-mobilisation. Jüri Uluots, the last constitutional prime minister of the republic of Estonia, the leader of the Estonian underground government delivered a radio address on 7 February that implored the able-bodied men born in 1904–1923 to report for military service. Before this, Uluots had opposed Estonian mobilisation as illegal under the Hague Conventions. Uluots hoped that by engaging in such a war Estonia would be able to attract Western support for the cause of independence from the USSR. The mobilisation drew wide support among Estonians and 38,000 men were drafted. After the mobilisation there were some 50,000–60,000 Estonians under arms in Estonia. The volunteer Estonian Legion created in 1942 was forced under the Waffen-SS in 1944 and expanded into the 20th Waffen Grenadier Division of the SS (1st Estonian) as other Estonian units that had fought on various fronts on the German side were rushed to Estonia. In addition, six border defence battalions were formed. In autumn 1944, it is estimated that there was the same number of Estonians under arms as at the time of the Estonian War of Independence, in total about 100,000 men. Volunteers from Norway, Denmark, the Netherlands and Belgium were also deployed in Estonia within the Sponheimer Group.

=== Formation of bridgeheads in Narva ===
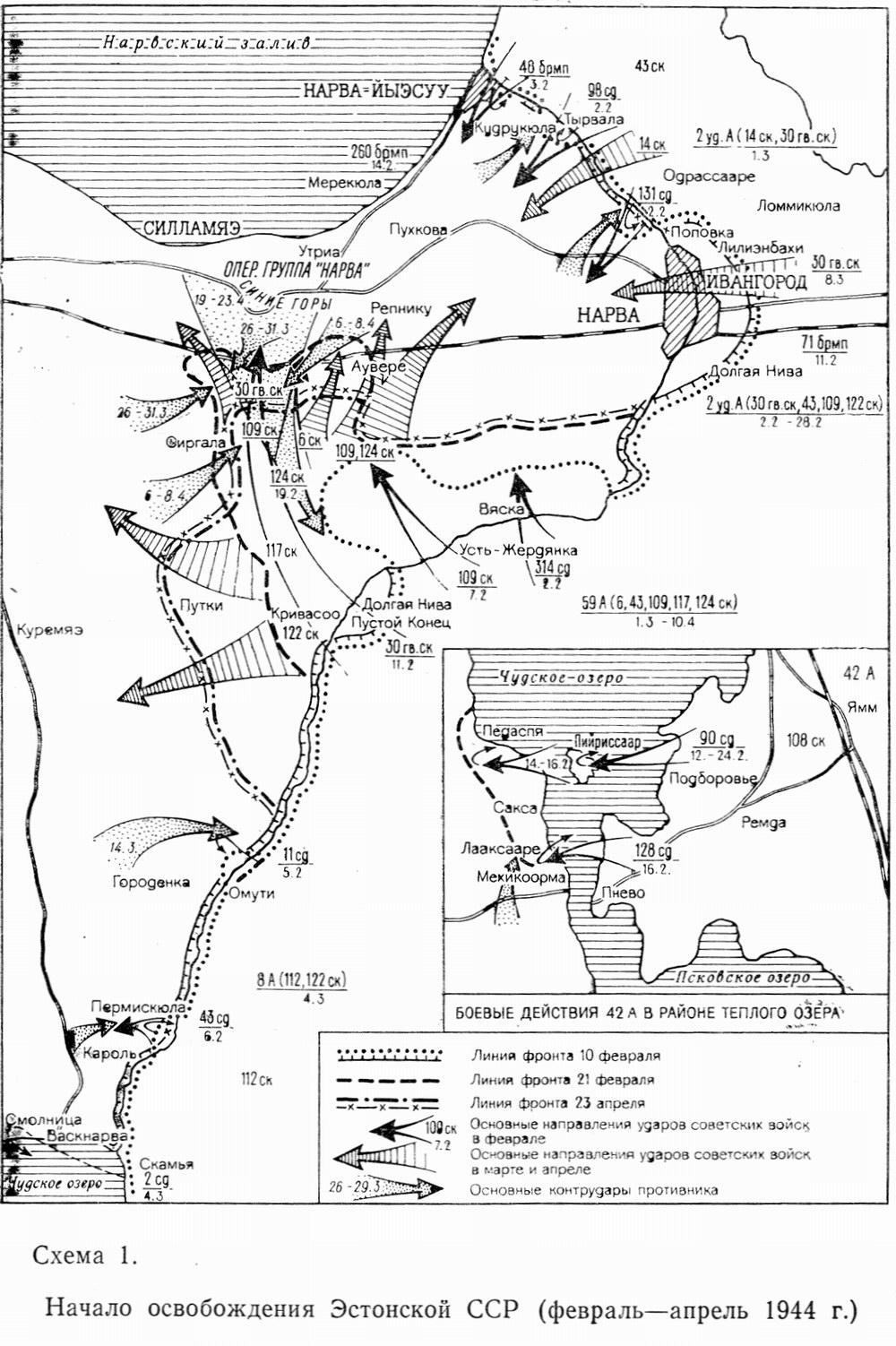
Soviet map of the beginning of Estonian Operation, February – April 1944

The Soviet Kingisepp–Gdov Offensive reached the Narva River on 2 February. Forward Soviet units of the 2nd Shock Army and the 8th Army established several bridgeheads on the west bank to the north and south of the city of Narva. On 7 February, the 8th Army expanded the bridgehead in the Krivasoo Swamp south of Narva cutting the Narva–Tallinn Railway behind the III (Germanic) SS Panzer Corps. The headquarters of the Leningrad Front were unable to take advantage of the opportunity of encircling the smaller German army group. The Sponheimer Group held its ground in the complicated situation. At the same time, the Soviet 108th Rifle Corps landed its units across Lake Peipus and established a bridgehead around the village of Meerapalu. By a coincidence, the Estonian Division headed for the Narva Front reached the area at the time. In the battle on 14–16 February, the I. Battalion, SS Volunteer Grenadier Regiment 45 Estland (1st Estonian) and a battalion of the 44th Infantry Regiment (consisting in personnel from East Prussia) destroyed the landed Soviet troops. The Mereküla Landing was conducted simultaneously, as the 517-strong Soviet 260th Independent Naval Infantry Brigade landed at the coastal borough Mereküla behind the Sponheimer Group lines. However, the amphibious unit was almost completely annihilated.

=== Narva Offensives, February and March ===
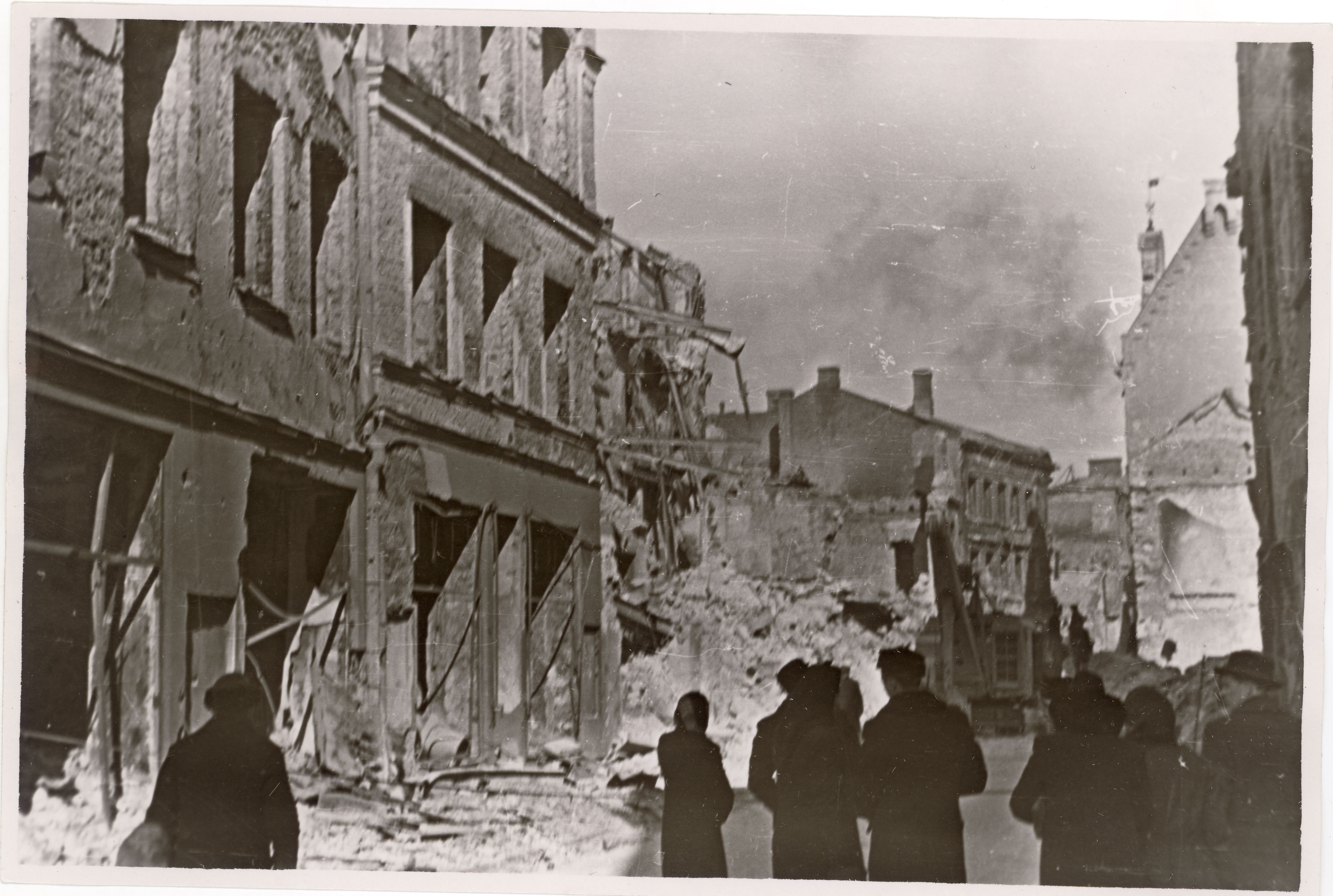
The old town of Tallinn after bombing by the Soviet Air Force in March 1944.

The 2nd Shock Army launched the new Narva Offensive on 15 February simultaneously from the bridgeheads north and south of the city of Narva aimed at encircling the III SS (Germanic) Panzer Corps. After ferocious battles, the exhausted Soviet army halted its operation on 20 February. Since the beginning of January, the Leningrad Front had lost 227,440 men as wounded, killed or missing in action, which constituted more than half of the troops who participated in the Leningrad-Novgorod Strategic Offensive.

The pause between the offensives was used for bringing in additional forces by both sides. On 24 February (Estonian Independence Day), fulfilling their first task at the Narva Front, the fresh SS Volunteer Grenadier Regiments 45 and 46 (1st and 2nd Estonian) counterattacked to break the Soviet bridgeheads. The assault by the 2nd Estonian Regiment destroyed the Soviet Riigiküla bridgehead. The attack of the 1st and 2nd Estonian Regiments commanded by Standartenführer Paul Vent liquidated the Siivertsi Bridgehead by 6 March.

By early March, the leadership of the Leningrad Front had drawn nine corps against seven German divisions and one brigade defending Narva. The Soviet Narva Offensive (1–4 March 1944) began to the southwest of Narva aiming to outflank and surround the citadel. The rifle corps of the 59th Army encircled the 214th Infantry Division and the Estonian 658th and 659th Eastern Battalions which kept resisting. This gave the army detachment "Narwa" command enough time to move in all available units and repulse the offensive.

A Soviet air raid leveled the historical town of Narva on 6 March 1944. The attack of the 2nd Shock Army infantry followed at the Ivangorod Bridgehead on the east bank of the river on 8 March. Simultaneously, pitched battles took place in the north of the town, where the Soviet 14th Rifle Corps supported by the artillery of the 8th Estonian Rifle Corps attempted to break through the German defence held by the Estonian regiments. The attacks were repulsed with great losses for the Soviets.

Soviet air assaults against civilians in Estonian towns aimed to force the Estonians away from supporting the German side against the Soviet offensive. The Soviet Long Range Aviation assaulted Tallinn on the night before 9 March. Approximately 40% of the housing space was destroyed in the city as 25,000 people were left without a shelter and 500 civilians killed. The result of the air raid was the opposite to the Soviet aim as the Estonians felt disgusted by Soviet atrocities and more men answered the German conscription call.

The six divisions, armoured vehicles and artillery of the Soviet 109th Rifle Corps and the newly brought 6th Rifle Corps initiated the Narva Offensive (18–24 March 1944) aimed towards Auvere railway station. The weakened German 61st Infantry Division held their defensive positions. The Kampfgruppe Strachwitz annihilated the Soviet 8th Army shock troop wedge on 26 March at the western end of the Krivasoo Bridgehead. The kampfgruppe destroyed the eastern tip of the bridgehead on 6 April. The Kampfgruppe Strachwitz inspired by their success tried to eliminate the bridgehead as a whole but was unable to proceed due to the spring thaw that had rendered the swamp impassable for its tank squadron. By the end of April, the parties at Narva had mutually exhausted their strengths. Relative calm settled on the front until late July 1944.

=== Sinimäed Hills ===
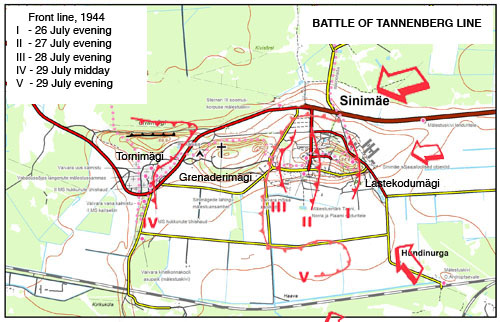
Battle of Tannenberg Line, 26–29 July 1944

The Soviet 8th Army launched the initial attack of the Narva Offensive at Auvere Railway Station. The 44th Infantry Regiment and the 1st Estonian Regiment repulsed it inflicting heavy losses to the Soviets. The III SS Panzer Corps were evacuated from Narva and the front was settled on the Tannenberg Line at the Sinimäed Hills on 26 July.

The Soviet advance guard attacked the Tannenberg Line conquering a part of the Lastekodumägi, the easternmost of the three hills. The Soviet attempts to conquer the rest of the hills failed on the following day. The German counterattack on July 28 subsequently collapsed under the defence of the Soviet tank regiments. The forces of the III Army Corps dug themselves into their new positions at the Grenaderimägi, the central of the three hills.

The climax of the Battle of Tannenberg Line was the Soviet attack on July 29. The Soviet shock units suppressed the German resistance at the Lastekodumägi, while the Soviet main forces suffered heavy casualties in the subsequent assault at the Grenaderimägi. The Soviet tanks encircled the Grenaderimägi and the westernmost Tornimägi. At the same time, SS-Obergruppenführer Felix Steiner sent out the remaining seven German tanks which hit the surprised Soviet armoured forces back. This enabled the multi-national combat unit to re-conquer the Grenaderimägi into German hands. Of the 136,830 Soviets initiating the Narva Operation, July 1944, a few thousand had survived and the Soviet tank regiments were demolished.

With the aid of swift reinforcements, the Red Army continued their attacks. The Stavka demanded the army detachment "Narwa" destroyed and the town of Rakvere conquered by no later than 7 August. The 2nd Shock Army was back to 20,000 troopers by 2 August while their numerous attempts pursuing unchanged tactics failed to break the "Narwa"'s defence. Govorov terminated the Soviet offensive on 10 August.

=== Southeastern Estonia ===
When the Estonian Operation failed in the Sinimäed, the combat was carried to the south of Lake Peipus. The main thrust of the Soviet Tartu Offensive Operation was aimed at the town of Petseri. On 10 August, the Soviet 67th Army broke through the defence of the XXVIII Army Corps. The 43rd Rifle Division captured the town of Võru on 13 August, forcing the troops of the 18th Army to the banks of the Gauja and the Väike Emajõgi Rivers. The German units supported by the local Omakaitse civil defence battalions fortified their positions along the Väike Emajõgi and repelled the numerous Soviet attempts until 14 September.

The Army Group North subjected the defence of the city of Tartu to the Kampfgruppe Wagner, which lacked sufficient troops to man the line. On 23 August, the 3rd Baltic Front launched an artillery barrage at the positions of the II. Battalion, 2nd Estonian Regiment in the village of Nõo southeast of Tartu. The Soviet 282nd Rifle Division, the 16th Single Tank Brigade, and two self-propelled artillery regiments passed the defence and captured the strategically important Kärevere Bridge across the Emajõgi River to the west of Tartu. On 25 August, three Soviet rifle divisions with the support of armoured and artillery units conquered the town and established a bridgehead on the north bank of the Emajõgi River.

Aleksander Warma, Estonia's Ambassador to Finland, had announced that the National Committee of the Estonian Republic had sent a telegram on 1 August which stated: "Estonians return home!". It was then announced that the Finnish Infantry Regiment 200 would be disbanded and that the volunteers were free to return home. An agreement had been reached with the Germans, and the Estonians were promised amnesty if they were to return. The I. Battalion of the Finnish Boys, Estonian Police Battalions No. 37 and 38 and a tank squadron destroyed the bridgehead of two Soviet divisions west of the town by 30 August and captured Kärevere Bridge. On 4 September, an operation commanded by Rebane, Vent and Oberstleutnant Meinrad von Lauchert attempted to re-capture Tartu. The attack was repulsed by units of the 3rd Baltic Front.

=== Baltic Offensive ===
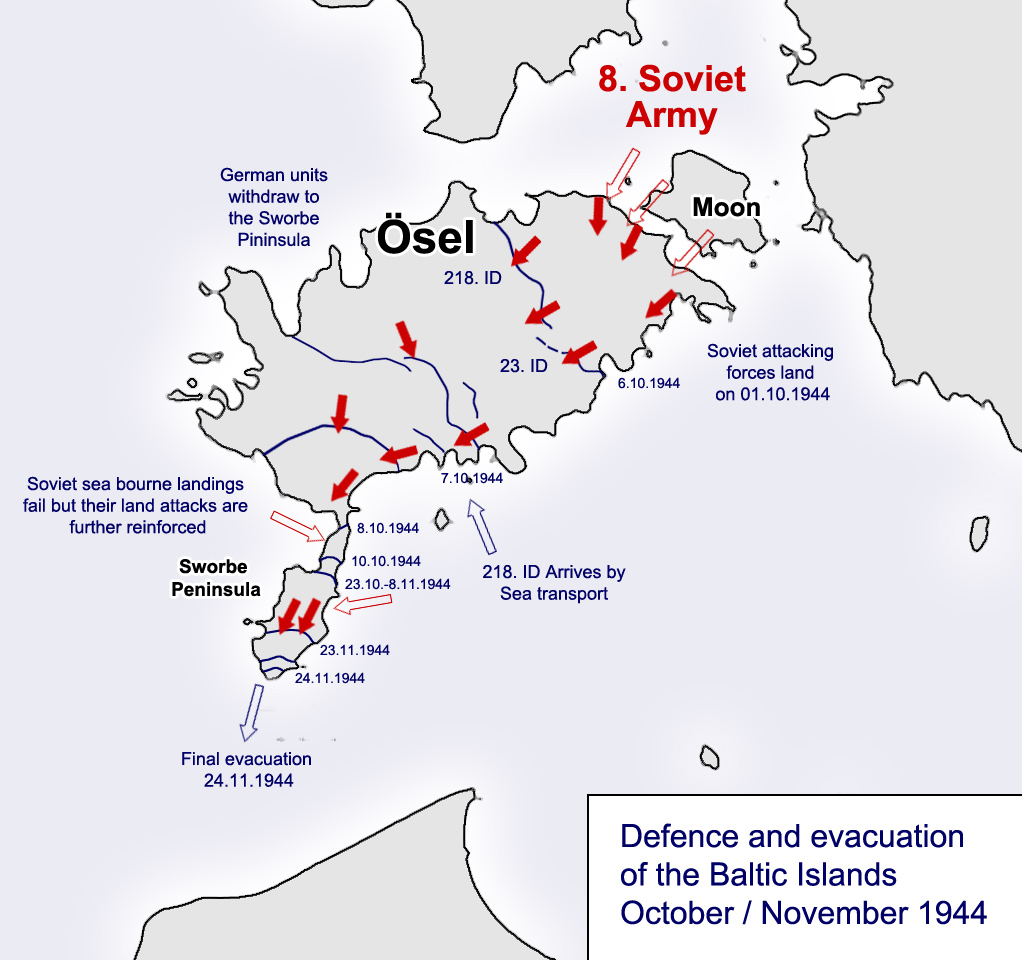
Soviet offensive on Saaremaa in October–November 1944.

As Finland left the war on 4 September 1944, according to the peace agreement with the Soviets the defence of the mainland became impossible and the command of Army Group Narwa started preparing an evacuation from Estonia. The three Soviet Baltic Fronts launched their Riga Offensive Operation on 14 September along the entire length of the German 18th Army front stretching from Madona town in Latvia to the mouth of the Väike Emajõgi river. In the Estonian segment from Valga railway junction to Lake Võrtsjärv, the 3rd Baltic Front attacked. In fierce battles, the German XXVIII Army Corps and the Omakaitse battalions held their positions against the overwhelming Soviet armies.

The Soviet Tallinn Offensive of the 2nd Shock Army commenced in the early morning of 17 September. After the artillery barrage of 132,500 shells and grenades fired at the German II Army Corps, the 8th Estonian Rifle Corps, the 30th Guard Rifle Corps, and the 108th Rifle Corps crossed the Emajõgi in the 25 km wide front segment eastwards from Tartu and went on the offensive with armoured and air support. The defence of the II Army Corps was breached. Only "Rebane" Battle Group placed near Tartu successfully held their front segment. Alfons Rebane extricated his troops with heavy losses. Army Group Narwa and the XXVIII Army Corps, the northernmost elements of Army Group North were at risk of being encircled and destroyed. Schörner ordered Army Group Narwa to abandon the defences of the Emajõgi line and the Narva front to be evacuated from mainland Estonia.

The fighters of the Estonian Rifle Corps murdered their compatriot soldiers fallen prisoner in the Battle of Porkuni, and the wounded soldiers sheltering in the Avinurme Parish church.

The three German divisions in the West Estonian archipelago (Moonsund archipelago) resisted until 23 November 1944.

According to Soviet data, conquering the territory of Estonia cost them 126,000 casualties, from all causes. The battles at the Narva front probably added 480,000 to the figure. On the German side, their own data shows 30,000 dead which is most likely underrated; a more realistic figure would be 45,000.

== Attempt to restore independence ==
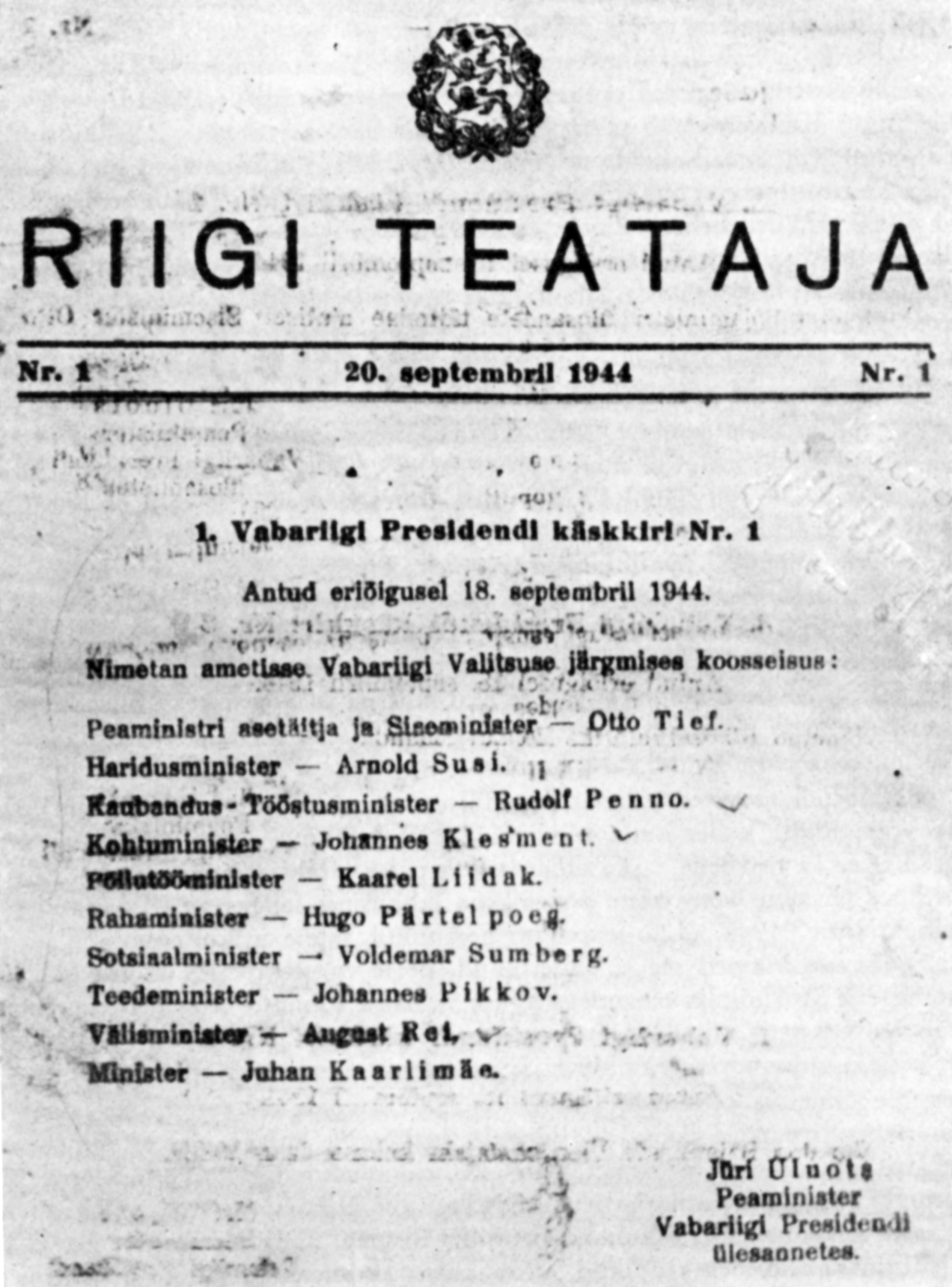
The 18 September 1944, proclamation of Government of Estonia in Riigi Teataja

As the Germans retreated, on 18 September Jüri Uluots formed a government led by the Deputy Prime Minister, Otto Tief; earlier Uluots tried to restore independence by appealing to the Nazis to allow him to form a government and supported the military conscription of Estonians by the Nazis. The Nazi German flag on Pikk Hermann was replaced with the flag of Estonia two days later; it was agreed with the German military authorities that on the next day, 21 September, the flag of Estonia would be raised alongside the Nazi Navy flag; the Nazi flag was bigger than the one of Estonia. On 21 September the Estonian national government was proclaimed. Royal Institute of International Affairs wrote back then that Estonian forces seized the government buildings in Toompea and ordered the German forces to leave, but according to a later publication, both Nazi and Estonian flags were raised in the presence of the Nazi guard of honor, and that the Nazis weren't forced to leave. The Red Army took Tallinn on 22 September and both flags on Pikk Hermann were replaced with the Red flag. After the evacuation of the German forces, the Estonian military units under the command of Rear Admiral Johan Pitka continued to resist the Red Army. The Estonian troops were defeated by the Soviet advance units in the battles held on 23 September west of Tallinn near Keila and Risti.

The Estonian underground government, not officially recognized by either Nazi Germany or the Soviet Union, fled to Stockholm, Sweden and operated in exile until 1992, when Heinrich Mark, the Prime Minister of the Republic of Estonia in duties of the President in exile, presented his credentials to the newly elected President of Estonia Lennart Meri. On 23 February. 1989 the flag of the Estonian SSR was lowered on Pikk Hermann, and was replaced with the flag of Estonia on 24 February 1989.

== Soviet return ==
Soviet forces reconquered Estonia in the autumn of 1944 after fierce battles in the northeast of the country on the Narva river (see Battle of Narva) and on the Tannenberg Line (Sinimäed). In 1944, in the face of the country being re-occupied by the Red Army, 80,000 people fled from Estonia by sea to Finland and Sweden, becoming war refugees and later, expatriates. 25,000 Estonians reached Sweden and a further 42,000 Germany. During the war about 8,000 Estonian Swedes and their family members had emigrated to Sweden. After the retreat of the Germans, about 30,000 Forest Brothers remained in hiding in the Estonian forests, to prepare for a massive guerrilla war. Commander of 46. SS Grenadier Regiment, Friedrich Kurg, stood with most of his men in the Estonian forests.

In 1949 27,650 Soviet troops still fought a war against the Forest Brothers. Only the 1949 mass deportation (see Operation Priboi) when about 21,000 people were taken away broke the basis of the insurgent movement. 6,600 Forest Brothers gave themselves up in November 1949. Later on, the failure of the Hungarian uprising broke the resistance morale of the 700 men still remaining under cover. According to the Soviet data, up to 1953, 20,351 insurgents were disarmed. Of these, 1,510 perished in the battles. During that period, 1,728 members of the Red Army, NKVD and the militia were killed by the Forest Brothers. August Sabbe, one of the last surviving Forest Brothers in Estonia, was discovered by KGB agents and drowned himself in 1978. After him there were few insurgents alive in the Estonian forests. Many of them died because of their age in the next 15 years.

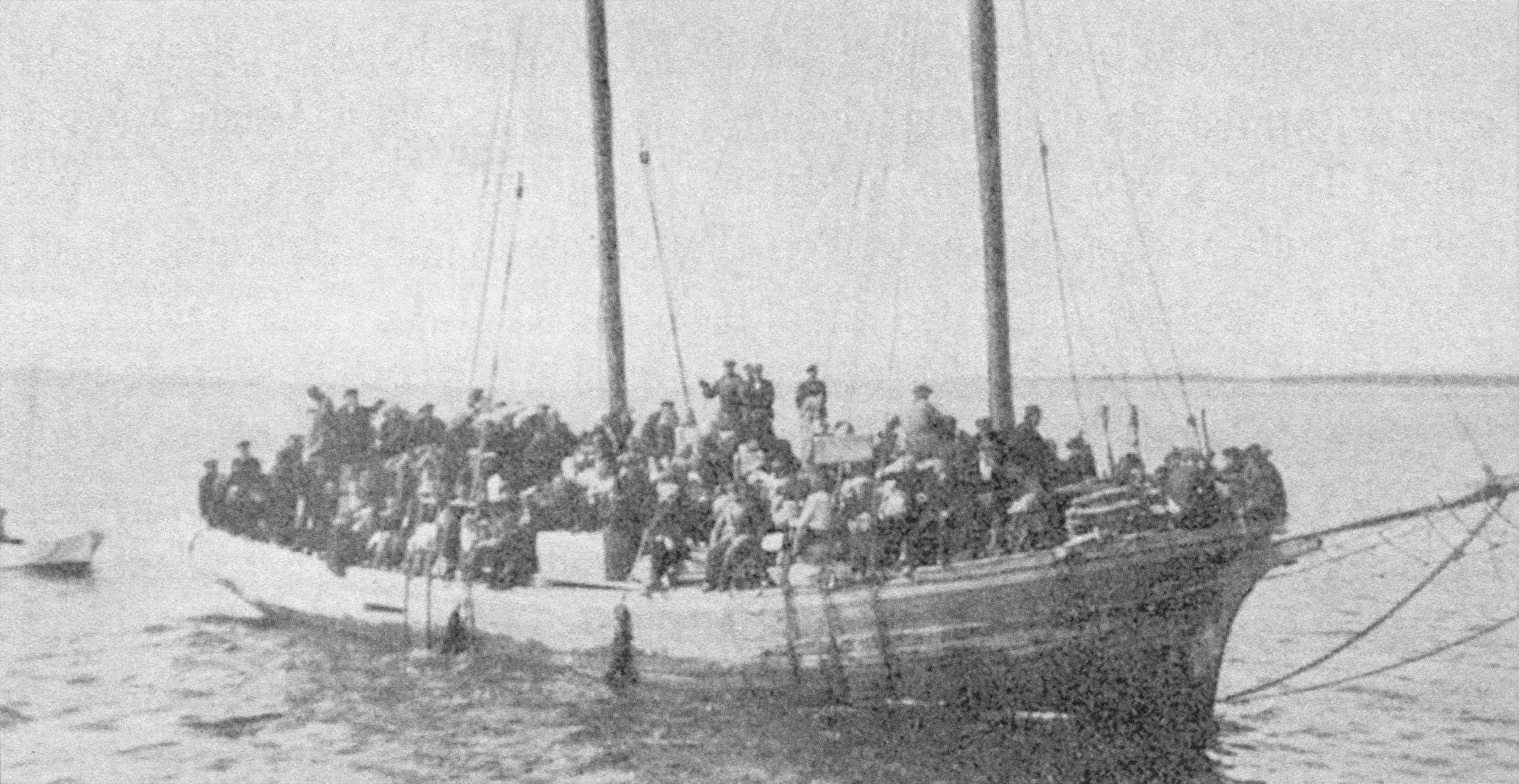
Estonian Swedes fleeing the Soviet occupation to Sweden in 1944.

During the first post-war decade of Soviet regime, Estonia was governed by Moscow via Russian-born Estonian governors. Born into the families of native Estonians in Russia, the latter had obtained their Red education in the Soviet Union during the Stalinist repressions at the end of the 1930s. Many of them had fought in the Red Army (in the Estonian Rifle Corps), and few of them had mastered the Estonian language.

Although the Soviet Union occupied Estonia in 1940 and re-occupied it in 1944, most Western democracies never recognized these actions as lawful. The United States’ Sumner Welles' Declaration of July 23, 1940, explicitly rejected the legitimacy of the Baltic annexations, and many governments continued to uphold that position throughout the Cold War. While the USSR controlled Estonia in practice, its claim was never accepted in law by the democratic world.

At the Yalta Conference in 1945, the United States and the United Kingdom acknowledged the reality of Soviet military control in Eastern Europe, but this was not equivalent to legal recognition of annexation. Estonian diplomats and consuls, appointed before the occupation, continued to function abroad with the recognition of numerous Western governments. This unique situation preserved Estonia’s legal continuity as a sovereign state until its independence was fully restored in 1991.

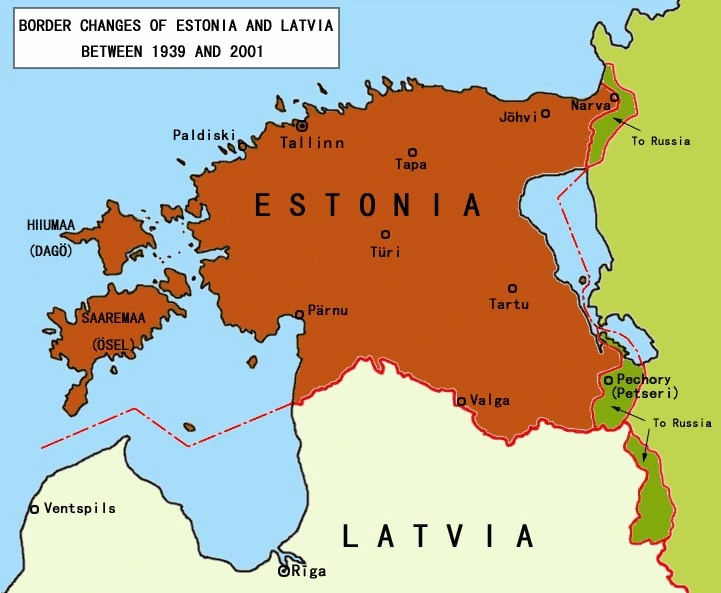
Border changes of Estonia after World War II.

After regaining independence, Estonia pressed for the rapid withdrawal of Soviet troops, demanding completion by the end of 1992. Moscow delayed, citing housing shortages, and by January 1992 around 25,000 troops still remained and held over 80,000 hectares of military land, heavy armor, and aircraft. The final Russian forces left in August 1994, and Russia relinquished its control of the nuclear reactor facilities in Paldiski in September 1995.

== Demographic losses ==
World War II demographic losses in Estonia, estimated at 25% of the population, were among the highest in Europe. The losses included direct deaths due to war and under both occupation regimes; planned repatriation (of Baltic Germans to Germany in 1939–1941, the Repatriation of Baltic Germans, and of Estonian Swedes to Sweden in 1943–1944); and flight of refugees in 1944. War and occupation deaths totaled about 81,000; these include deaths from combat, Soviet deportations in 1941, Soviet executions, German deportations and executions, and victims of the Holocaust in Estonia. About 75,000 to 80,000 of Estonians became permanent war refugees, primarily in Germany and Sweden. Demographic losses also included loss of population due to Estonian borders being redrawing in 1945 and birth deficit due the war conditions.

== Assessment ==
Views diverge on the history of Estonia during World War II:

=== The position of the European Court of Human Rights ===
The Court notes, first, that Estonia lost its independence as a result of the Treaty of Non-Aggression between Germany and the Union of Soviet Socialist Republics (also known as "Molotov-Ribbentrop Pact"), concluded on 23 August 1939, and the secret additional protocols to it. Following an ultimatum to set up Soviet military bases in Estonia in 1939, a large-scale entry of the Soviet army into Estonia took place in June 1940. The lawful government of the country was overthrown and Soviet rule was imposed by force. The totalitarian communist regime of the Soviet Union conducted large-scale and systematic actions against the Estonian population, including, for example, the deportation of about 10,000 persons on 14 June 1941 and of more than 20,000 on 25 March 1949. After the Second World War, tens of thousands of persons went into hiding in the forests to avoid repression by the Soviet authorities; part of those in hiding actively resisted the occupation regime. According to the data of the security organs, about 1,500 persons were killed and almost 10,000 arrested in the course of the resistance movement of 1944–1953. Interrupted by the German occupation in 1941–1944, Estonia remained occupied by the Soviet Union until its restoration of independence in 1991.

=== The position of the Estonian government ===
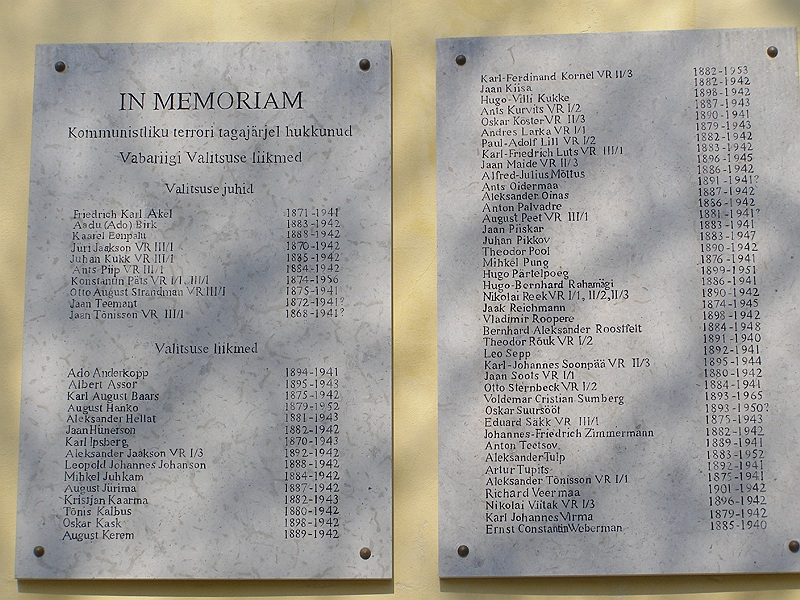
Plaque on the building of the Government of Estonia, Toompea, commemorating government members killed by communist terror

According to the Estonian point of view, the occupation of Estonia by the Soviet Union lasted five decades, only interrupted by the Nazi invasion of 1941–1944. Following the events of the Bronze night in 2007, the national conservative UEN group of the European Parliament made a motion for a resolution acknowledging the 48 years of occupation as a fact. The final resolution recognized Estonia’s occupation and loss of independence starting from the 1939 "Hitler-Stalin" pact (Molotov–Ribbentrop pact) and lasting until 1991, noting that Western democracies regarded the Soviet annexation as illegal.

=== The position of the Russian government ===
The Russian government and officials continue to maintain that the Soviet annexation of the Baltic states was legitimate and that the Soviet Union liberated the countries from the Nazis. They state that the Soviet troops had entered the Baltic countries in 1940 following the agreements and with the consent of the governments of the Baltic republics. They maintain that the USSR was not in a state of war and was not waging any combat activities on the territory of the three Baltic states, therefore, the argument goes, the word occupation can not be used. "The assertions about [the] 'occupation' by the Soviet Union and the related claims ignore all legal, historical and political realities, and are therefore utterly groundless." (Russian Foreign Ministry)

=== Positions of the veterans ===
Estonian national Ilmar Haaviste, head of an association of Estonian veterans who fought on the German side: "Both regimes were equally evil – there was no difference between the two except that Stalin was more cunning". Estonian national Arnold Meri who fought on the Soviet side and was later charged with genocide for his role in the deportations: "Estonia's participation in World War II was inevitable. Every Estonian had only one decision to make: whose side to take in that bloody fight – the Nazis' or the anti-Hitler coalition's." Russian national Viktor Andreyev who fought on the Soviet side in Estonia answering the question: "How do you feel being called an 'occupier'?" — "Half believe one thing, half believe another. That's in the run of things."

In 2004 the controversy regarding the events of World War II surrounded the Monument of Lihula. In April 2007 the diverging views on the history caused the Bronze Soldier of Tallinn protests.

=== Position of other scholars ===
Historian Martti Turtola argues in two of his books that Konstantin Päts and Johan Laidoner consciously led Estonia to non-resistance and thinking Estonia was an ally of the Soviet Union, via treaties such as Soviet–Estonian Mutual Assistance Treaty. With both Laidoner and Päts readily agreeing to such agreements and not making any defensive preparations for a possible invasion or occupation by the Soviet Union or suspecting the Soviets might break their treaties with Estonia. Laidoner even clamped down on potential officers in the Estonian Army that might want to resist the Soviets. Estonia even purchased military equipment, such as Il-16 (that did never arrive) from the Soviet Union. This ultimately backfired when both Päts and Laidoner ended up in prison and Estonia occupied. Päts and Laidoner had hoped for some positions within Soviet Estonia. These views and Turtola's research are controversial, considering Turtola paint Päts and Laidoner as traitors or collaborators, without actually going so far as to say it out loud. Turtola also often compares Estonias 1939-1940 experience with Finland's experience during the same period, where Finland resisted the Soviets and survived as an independent nation, while Estonia didn't. Turtola states in his book about Päts that Estonia could have mobilized 120,000 troops for a defense, in theory Estonia could have resisted at least for a while. With Finland lasting for three months in the Winter War, even when losing the war, didn't lose their independence. He later argues in the book about Laidoner that the potential resistance would still have been hard, since the above-mentioned steps taken by Laidoner to remove officers that would be willing to fight and replaced them with officers more open to cooperation with the soviets. The book about Konstantin Päts sold widely in Estonia when it was released.

== Notes ==
Footnotes

Citations
