= Omakaitse =

Militia organisation in Estonia

- Active: 1917–1918; 3 July 1941 – 17 September 1944
- Disbanded: September 1944
- Country: Estonia
- Allegiance: Estonia (1917–1918); Nazi Germany (1941–1944)
- Branch: Militia
- Role: defence from Soviet Armed Forces
- Size: 40,000
- Engagements: Russian revolution, World War II: Summer War, Tartu Offensive, Tallinn Offensive

Commanders
- Notable commanders: Friedrich Kurg, Johannes Soodla, Jaan Maide, Arnold Sinka

Insignia
- Identification symbol: White armband

The Omakaitse ('self guard') was a militia organisation in Estonia. It was founded in 1917 following the Russian Revolution. On the eve of the occupation of Estonia by the German Empire, the Omakaitse units took over major towns in the country, allowing the Salvation Committee of the Estonian Provincial Assembly to proclaim the independence of Estonia. After the German occupation the Omakaitse was reformed into the Estonian Defence League.

The Estonian Defence League was dissolved in 1940 after the Soviet occupation of Estonia.

The Omakaitse was reestablished during the German Operation Barbarossa in 1941 by the Forest brothers who took control of the country before the German troops arrived allowing Jüri Uluots to establish a co-ordinating council in Tartu to proclaim the provisional government of Estonia. (Note: In some areas of southern Estonia, pro independence administrations were already in place by the time German troops arrived. Jüri Uluots set up a co-ordinating council in Tartu, yet stopped short of declaring a provisional government.Smith 2001, pp. 34–35) The Germans disbanded the provisional government but allowed the armed units in the Omakaitse after Estonia became a part of the German-occupied Reichskommissariat Ostland. During World War II Omakaitse existed from 3 July 1941 – 17 September 1944 at the Eastern Front (World War II).

== Background ==
The Omakaitse was a unique organisation in the context of the Eastern Front, as in Latvia, which otherwise shared a common fate with Estonia, there was no organisation of this kind.

== Formation and Summer War ==
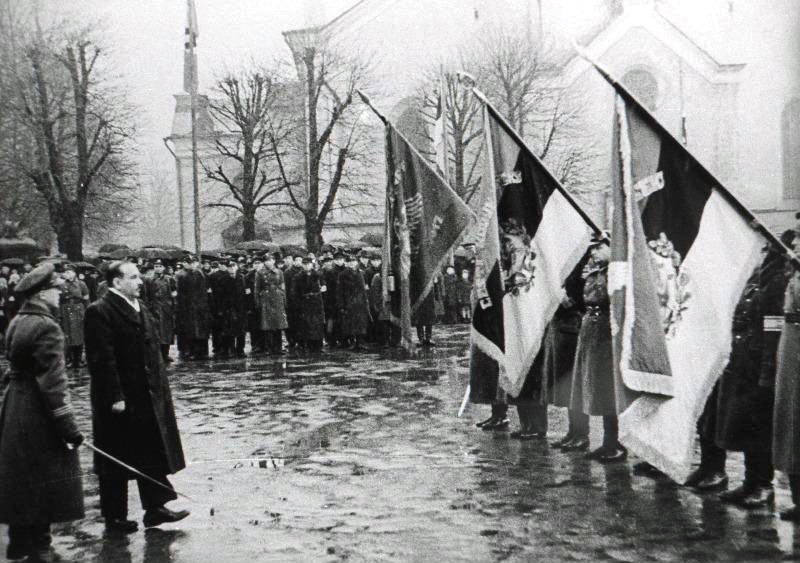
Omakaitse parade on Freedom Square, Tallinn, 1944. Frame from German newsreel

The Estonian Defence League did not completely cease to exist after being closed down during the Soviet occupation in summer 1940. Its members hid some of the weapons but it was done on their own initiative and only in a few locations. They maintained communication, common listening to foreign radio stations was organised as well as discussions of world affairs and future prospects.

After the June deportation in 1941 and the breakout of war between Germany and the Soviet Union, the former members of the Defence League and other civilians formed partisan groups in the woods called forest brothers. As clashes with the retreating Soviet 8th Army, destruction battalions and NKVD escalated into the Summer War, the partisan groups formed themselves into Omakaitse of rural municipalities and regions. The formation of countywide structures began right after the arrival of the German 18th Army. The first such organisation was created on 3 July 1941 in the town of Kilingi-Nõmme. It included the units of Omakaitse and forest brothers of rural municipalities.

The Pärnu County Omakaitse was formed on 8 July, after the 18th Army had taken the town of Pärnu. The countywide Omakaitse organisations of Valga, Petseri, Võru, Tartu, Viljandi were formed on subsequent days. 9,175 Omakaitse troops attacked the retreating Soviet forces. The battle of Tartu lasted for two weeks and destroyed a large part of the city. Under the leadership of Major Friedrich Kurg, the Omakaitse drove the Soviets from Tartu, behind the rivers Pärnu and Emajõgi, securing South Estonia under Estonian control by 10 July.

== German occupation ==
After the arrival of the 18th Army troops the Omakaitse organisations were subordinated to local Wehrmacht field commanders. This happened in Pärnu on 10 July, in Tartu on 11 July, in Valga on 12 July and in Võru on 14 July. The Omakaitse units disbanded on 29 July 1941 at the orders of the German Army Group North. On voluntary basis, the formations were summoned yet again on 2 August 1941 under the name of the Estonian Omakaitse. The Omakaitse organisation of Tallinn was formed on 28 August and later in Saaremaa island. Members were initially selected from the closest circles of friends. Later, candidate members were asked to sign a declaration that they were not members of a Communist organisation. The Estonian Omakaitse relied on the former regulations of the Estonian Defence League and Estonian Army, insofar as they were consistent with the laws of German occupation. The tasks of the Omakaitse were as follows:

1. Defence of the coast and borders;
2. Fight against parachutists, sabotage, and espionage;
3. Guarding militarily important objects;
4. Fight against Communism;
5. Assistance to Estonian Auxiliary Police and guaranteeing the general safety of the citizens;
6. Providing assistance in case of large-scale accidents (fires, floods, diseases, etc.);
7. Providing military training for its members and other loyal citizens;
8. Deepening and preserving the patriotic and national feelings of citizens.

On 15 July, the Omakaitse had 10,200 members, on 1 December 1941, 40,599 members. Until the mobilisations of February 1944, the membership was roughly 40,000. Approximately 1000–1200 men of the Omakaitse (2.5–3%) were directly involved in criminal acts, taking part in the round-up, guarding or killing of 400–1000 Romani people and 6000 Jews in the concentration camps of Pskov region of Russia and Jägala, Vaivara, Klooga, and Lagedi camps in Estonia. Guarded among others by the few percent of the Omakaitse, 15,000 Soviet prisoners of war died in Estonia, some of them because of neglect and mistreatment and some executed.

The Estonian Omakaitse remained a voluntary territorial defense organisation until 2 October 1943, when the Estonian puppet government ('Self-Administration') issued a regulation with regards to calling the male population to Home Guard Service. It became compulsory for men aged 17–45 to become members of the Omakaitse. The regulation on 29 January 1944 made membership of the Omakaitse obligatory for males aged 17–60 and not affected by general mobilisation. The combat battalions consisted in men who either for health reasons or for their age were not mobilised into the German Armed Forces. The men were mostly wearing civilian clothes, but were obliged to wear armbands with distinctive insignia. Their training was incomplete and they were armed with old British, German and Russian rifles and light and heavy machine guns from World War I. Therefore, the Omakaitse territorial battalions were deployed to Lake Peipus coast guard duties and insignificant sectors of the front. However, in the defence of the Väike Emajõgi river line against the Soviet Tartu Offensive in August–September and the Riga Offensive in September 1944, some of the battalions became involved in serious combat operations. When the Army Group North started to withdraw from mainland Estonia, most of the members of the Omakaitse returned to their homes. However, the members who got evacuated to Germany were sent to the 20th Waffen Grenadier Division of the SS (1st Estonian).
