= Tartu offensive =

Campaign fought over southeastern Estonia in 1944

- Part of the Eastern Front of World War II
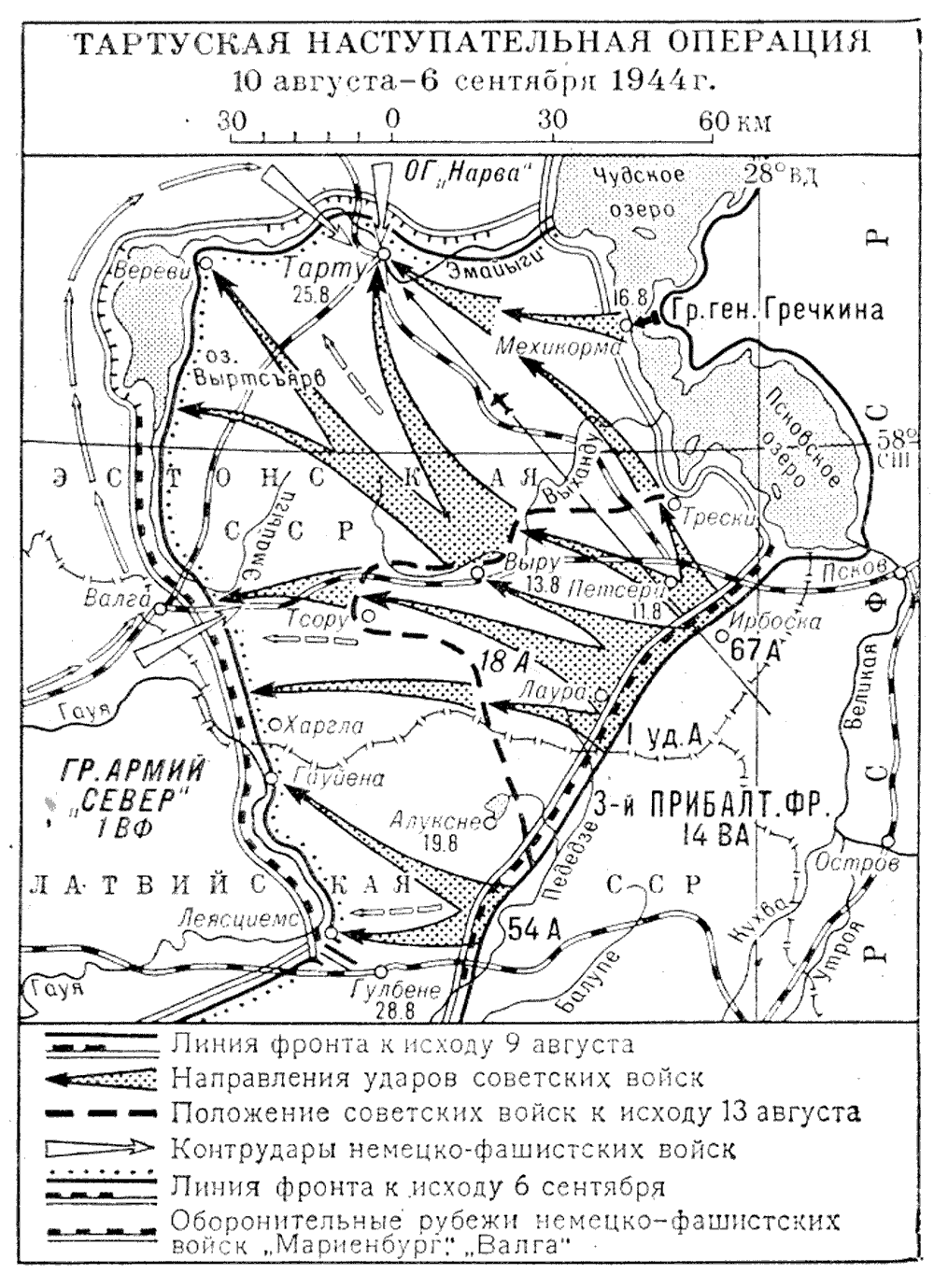
- Soviet map of the offensive
Date	10 August – 6 September 1944
Location	Southeastern Estonia 58°22′N 26°43′E
Result	Soviet victory

Belligerents
(Nazi Germany) Germany	Soviet Union

Commanders and leaders
Jürgen Wagner	Ivan Maslennikov

Units involved
Army Group North (20th SS Division, Estonian Auxiliary Police, Omakaitse)	3rd Baltic Front

Strength
65,000 personnel	272,800 personnel

Casualties and losses
?	?

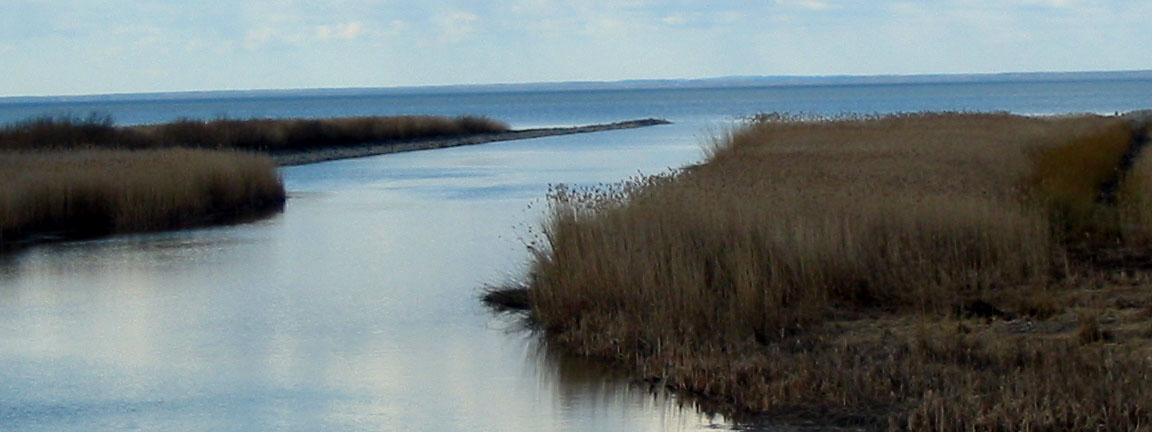
Marshy banks of the Emajõgi River and Lake Võrtsjärv in southern Estonia

The Tartu offensive operation (Russian: Тартуская наступательная операция), also known as the Battle of Tartu (Estonian: Tartu lahing) and the Battle of Emajõgi (Estonian: Emajõe lahingud, German: Schlacht am Embach) was a campaign fought over southeastern Estonia in 1944. It took place on the Eastern Front during World War II between the Soviet 3rd Baltic Front and parts of the German Army Group North.

The Soviet tactical aim was to defeat the 18th Army and to capture the city of Tartu. The strategic goal was a quick occupation of Estonia. The Soviet command planned to reach the coast of the Gulf of Riga and trap the Army Detachment "Narwa". The German side involved Estonian conscripts, which fought to defend their country against the looming Soviet annexation. The 3rd Baltic Front captured Tartu. The conquest caused the destruction of the Estonian National Museum and 40 million roubles worth of damage to the University of Tartu. Kampfgruppe "Wagner" stabilised the front at the Emajõgi River. The XXVIII Army Corps supported by Omakaitse militia stalled the front at the Väike Emajõgi and Gauja Rivers, preventing the 3rd Baltic Front from cutting off the "Narwa".

== Background ==
Attacks of the Leningrad Front had pushed the Army Group North to the west of Lake Peipus resulting in a series of operations around Narva. The German Command considered it important to maintain control over the southern shore of the Gulf of Finland, which eased the situation in Finland and kept the Soviet Baltic Fleet in its eastern bay. From a military economy viewpoint, the preservation of the oil shale reserves and oil shale industry in Ida-Viru was also important. From a purely military and tactical point of view, the German forces holding the Estonian region as well as the surrounding areas was becoming increasingly exposed by Soviet movements and attacks to the south. This became quite apparent when, after initial successes, Soviet forces advanced towards the Baltic seacoast at the end of their Operation Bagration of June–August 1944 against the German Army Group Centre.

=== Comparison of forces ===
At the beginning of the Soviet Tartu Operation, the ratio of Soviet to German strength was 4.3:1 for troops, 14.8:1 for artillery and 4.1:1 for armour. The German forces were mostly battle groups from various formations and smaller units from different branches. A significant proportion of the German side was constituted of Omakaitse militia battalions with poor weaponry and little fighting ability.

== Combat activities ==
The main thrust of the Soviet operation was first aimed at the southern Petseri County. On 10 August, the Soviet 67th Army broke through the defence of the XXVIII Army Corps and captured the town of Võru on 13 August. The XXVIII Army Corps were forced to the banks of the Väike Emajõgi and Gauja Rivers in the west where they were supported by the Viljandi County Omakaitse militia battalion. While the defence prevented the 3rd Baltic Front from cutting off the retreat of the Army Detachment "Narwa" from Estonia, there was open ground towards Tartu, Estonia's second largest city. Army Group North created a Kampfgruppe (an ad-hoc combat formation), led by SS-Brigadeführer Jürgen Wagner and manned by an army detachment, for the defence of the new line. The Soviet tank units forced a wedge between the Kampfgruppe and the XXVIIIth Army Corps; Wagner had insufficient troops ahead of the city. On 16 August, Lieutenant General Alexey Grechkin's group launched an amphibious assault over Lake Peipus behind the German left (east) flank, beating the Omakaitse defence and forming a bridgehead in the village of Mehikoorma. In fierce battles, a local border guard regiment stopped their advance.

The 3rd Baltic Front launched an artillery barrage at the positions of the 2nd Battalion, 45 Waffen SS Grenadier Regiment (1st Estonian) covering the German right flank in the village of Nõo southeast of Tartu on 23 August. The Soviet 282nd Rifle Division backed by the 16th Single Tank Brigade and two self-propelled artillery regiments bypassed the defence on the west side and captured the Kärevere Bridge across the Emajõgi River west of Tartu. Being one of only four bridges across the 100 kilometres long marshy floodplains of the river, it was of high strategic importance. After sappers failed to destroy the bridge, Sturmbannführer Leon Degrelle improvised a defence line of the 5th SS Volunteer Sturmbrigade Wallonien, avoiding a Soviet breakthrough to Tartu. As a result, he was awarded the Knight's Cross of the Iron Cross with Oak Leaves.

A heavy German tank assault had been planned to attack behind the western flank of the Soviet lines in Elva on 24 August. On the night before the attack, the designated commander of the operation Generalmajor Hyazinth von Strachwitz had a serious car accident. The Soviet tank squadrons repulsed the German attack on the following day. Four Soviet rifle divisions launched an attack at Tartu with the support of armour and artillery. After fierce street battles, the Soviet forces conquered the city and established a bridgehead on the north bank of the Emajõgi on 25 August. Due to "Wagner"'s inability to hold back the Soviet offensive, the headquarters of the Army Group North turned over command of the Emajõgi Front to the II Army Corps, commanded by Infantry General Wilhelm Hasse. At the end of August, the III. Battalion, 1st Estonian Regiment was formed from the 1st Battalion of the Finnish Infantry Regiment 200, recently returned to Estonia. As their largest operation, supported by Estonian Police Battalions No. 37, 38 and Mauritz Freiherr von Strachwitz's tank squadron, they destroyed the bridgehead of two Soviet divisions and recaptured Kärevere Bridge by 30 August. The operation shifted the entire front back to the southern bank of the Emajõgi and encouraged the II Army Corps to launch an operation attempting to recapture Tartu. The attack of 4–6 September reached the northern outskirts of the city but was repulsed by units of four Soviet rifle divisions. Relative calm settled on the front for the subsequent thirteen days.

The property of the University of Tartu suffered heavy losses in the campaign, accounting for 40 million roubles of damage (equalling to the purchasing power of US$90 million in 2008). The university lost fifteen buildings permanently. The damage done to the roofs, interiors, doors, windows, heating systems, study cabinets and laboratories was three times the damage to the ruined buildings. The Museum of Zoology lost all of its wet preparations. The interiors of the laboratories of chemistry, physics, pathology and dairy, and a large number of instruments for the observatories of astronomy and geophysics were destroyed by shrapnel or looted. Bombing destroyed Raadi Manor, the main building of the Estonian National Museum.

== Aftermath ==
=== Baltic offensive ===
The 2nd Shock Army crossed Lake Peipus in 5–11 September and acquired command over the Emajõgi front. In the Riga offensive operation on 14–16 September, the 3rd Baltic Front attacked the German XXVIII Army Corps and the Omakaitse militia battalions in the front segment from the Valga railway junction to Lake Võrtsjärv. In fierce battles, the German and Estonian units held their positions.

The Soviet Tallinn offensive of the 2nd Shock and 8th Armies commenced on the early morning of 17 September. The 2nd Shock Army forced its way through the II Army Corps divisional headquarters and artillery positions along the Emajõgi. The Army Detachment "Narwa" and the XXVIII Army Corps, the northernmost elements of Army Group North, were at risk of being encircled and destroyed. The headquarters of the Army Group North ordered the II Army Corps to abandon the defence of the Emajõgi line and to move quickly around the northern tip of Lake Võrtsjärv to Latvia.

The code name for the withdrawal of the Army Detachment "Narwa" from mainland Estonia was Operation "Aster". Beginning on 17 September 1944, a naval force under Vice-Admiral Theodor Burchardi evacuated elements of the Army Detachment and Estonian civilians. Within six days, around 50,000 troops, 20,000 civilians and 1,000 prisoners were evacuated. The remaining elements of the Army Detachment were ordered to withdraw into Latvia by way of Pärnu and Viljandi. The III SS (Germanic) Panzer Corps reached Pärnu by September 20, while the II Army Corps retreated south of Viljandi to form the 18th Army's rearguard. As they retreated, the Soviet 2nd Shock and 8th Armies advanced and took Tallinn on September 22.

=== Soviet reoccupation ===
Soviet rule of Estonia was re-established by force, and sovietisation followed, which was mostly carried out in 1944–1950. The forced collectivisation of agriculture began in 1947, and was completed after the mass deportation of Estonians in March 1949. All private farms were confiscated, and farmers were made to join the collective farms. An armed resistance movement of 'Forest Brothers' was active until the mass deportations. A total of 30,000 participated or supported the movement; 2,000 were killed. The Soviet authorities fighting the Forest Brothers suffered also hundreds of deaths. Among those killed on both sides were innocent civilians. Besides the armed resistance of the Forest Brothers, a number of underground nationalist schoolchildren groups were active. Most of their members were sentenced to long terms of imprisonment. The punitive actions decreased rapidly after Joseph Stalin's death in 1953; from 1956–58, a large part of the deportees and political prisoners were allowed to return to Estonia. Political arrests and numerous other crimes against humanity were committed all through the occupation period until the late 1980s. After all, the attempt to integrate Estonian society into the Soviet system failed. Although the armed resistance was defeated, the population remained anti-Soviet. This helped the Estonians to organise a new resistance movement in the late 1980s, regain their independence in 1991, and then rapidly develop a modern society.
