= Bombing of Narva in World War II =

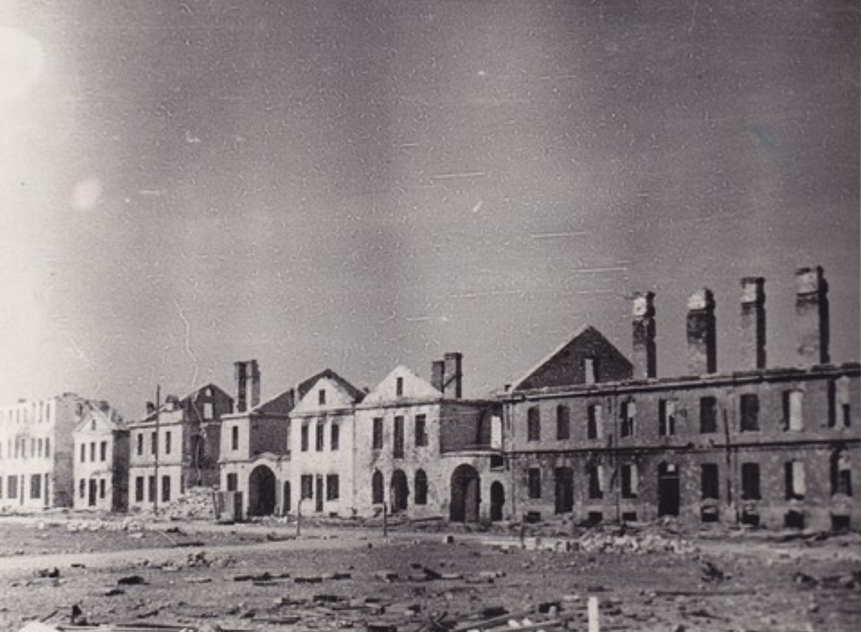
Ruins of Peetri square in Narva ~1944/45

During World War II, the eastern Estonian town Narva suffered from many aerial bombings by the Soviet Air Force between 1941 and 1944. Most of the buildings in the city were destroyed during the war, only 198 out of 3550 buildings were considered habitable. The most damaging of these air raids are known as the 'March bombings', destroying most of the city and killing hundreds.

== Background ==
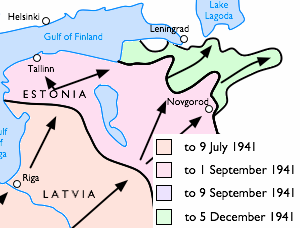
Map showing German military activity in Estonia and the Leningrad Front from June-December 1941

After the Baltic States were invaded and occupied by the Soviet Union in 1940, Nazi Germany launched their invasion of the Soviet Union and the territories it occupied in 1941. German forces captured Narva in August 1941, and the town remained in German occupation until 1944. After heavy fighting during the Battle of Narva, causing heavy casualties on both sides, Narva was recaptured by the Soviet forces in July 1944, after German troops withdrew from the area.

== Aerial bombings ==
During the Summer War, German forces captured Narva in August 1941, and the city faced minor damage due to small scale aerial bombing raids by the Soviet Union. The city would remain facing small scale air raids by the Soviet Union until 1944, which would be known as the March Bombings (Estonian: Märtsipommitamine), which affected a number of Estonian cities.

== March bombing and the Battle of Narva ==
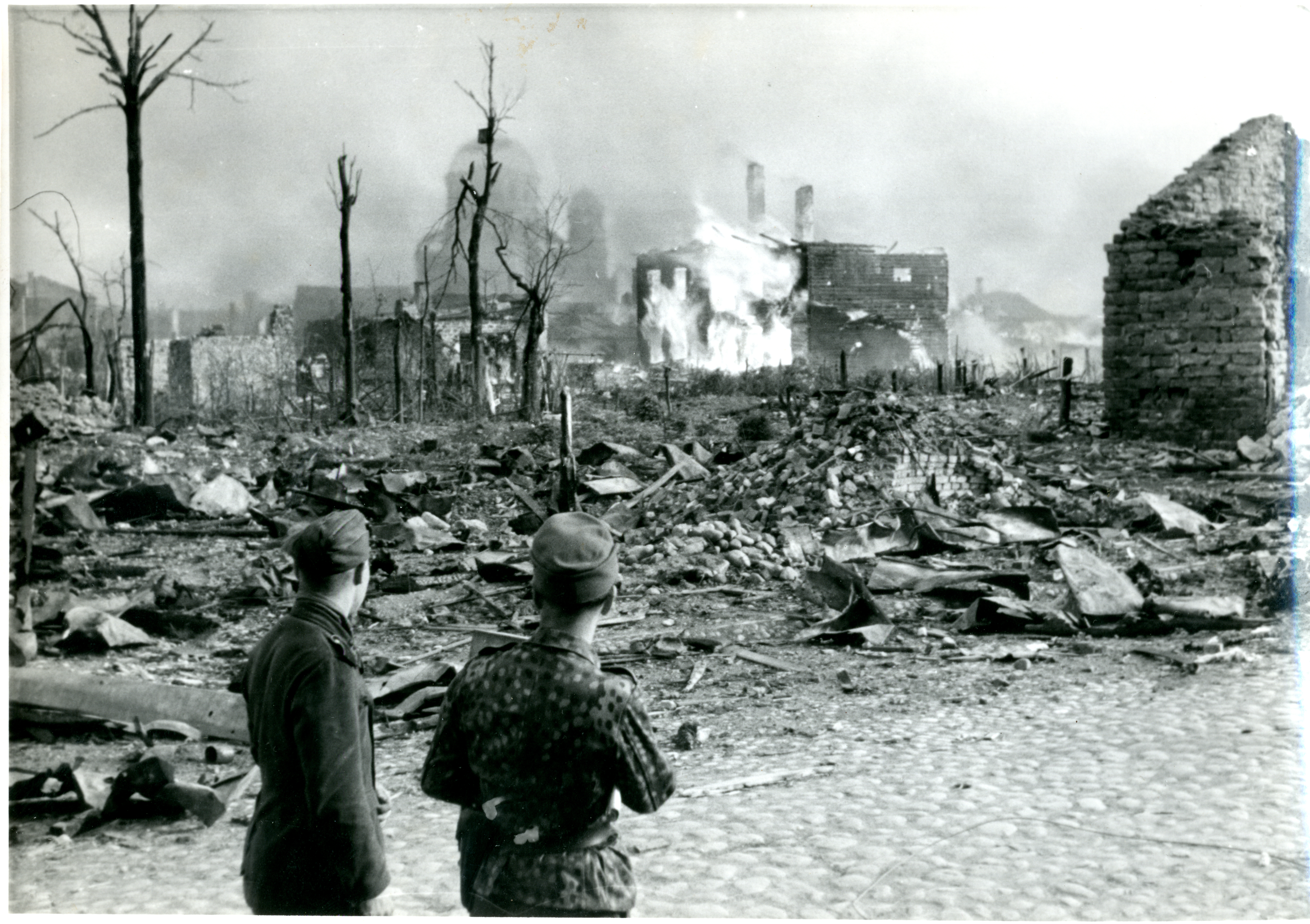
Narva after artillery and air raids in 1944 during the Battle of Narva

Starting from 25 January 1944 to 3 March 1944, a majority of the city's population was evacuated as battles approached and the Battle of Narva began. The Battle of Narva began on 2 February 1944, between soldiers fighting under the Nazi German army and soldiers fighting under the Soviet army to obtain the Narva Isthmus, which was strategically important.

In late February/early March, Soviet command planned multiple air raids on Narva, and other Estonian cities, including Estonia's capital, Tallinn. Narva experienced these air raids on March 6, 7, and 8, causing major infrastructural and civilian/soldier casualties. Around 100 Soviet bombers participated in these aerial raids on Narva. These air raids that affected cities in Estonia was known as the March Bombings. The city was further damaged during the battle from artillery shelling by both sides.

Narva was bombed again on 25 July 1944, and the city was recaptured by Soviet forces on 26 July 1944, as part of the Narva offensive after German troops withdrew from the area.

== Air raids 1941-1944 ==
Narva experienced multiple air raids from 1941-1944:

=== 1941 ===
Narva experienced around 30 air raids in late 1941. Railway structures and bridges were targeted to disrupt German supply and troop movement.

=== 1942 ===
- January 25 - 3 attacks causing major damage to buildings and civilians were killed and injured.
- March 5 - ~8 civilians were killed.
- March 8 - 2 attacks causing minor damage to buildings.
- March 11 - 3 attacks causing minor damage to buildings.
- March 15 - Minor damage to buildings.
- June 25 - A railway bridge was destroyed.
- August 2 - 1 civilian killed and 4 injured.
- August 6 - Minor damage to buildings.
- October 5 - Minor damage to buildings.
- October 7 - ~7 civilians were killed.

=== 1943 ===
- January 14 - 12 buildings were destroyed and ~7 civilians killed.
- February 9-10 - A train with ammunition at a train station was hit by a bomb.
- February 11 - Minor damage to buildings.
- March 13 - 10 civilians were killed.
- March 16 - Minor damage to buildings.
- March 25 - Minor damage to buildings.
- May 16 - ~70 people were killed, consisting of civilians and German soldiers.
- June 13 - Town hall and a museum was destroyed and 6 civilians were killed.
- June 18 - Minor damage to buildings.
- June 24 - Minor damage to buildings.

=== 1944 ===
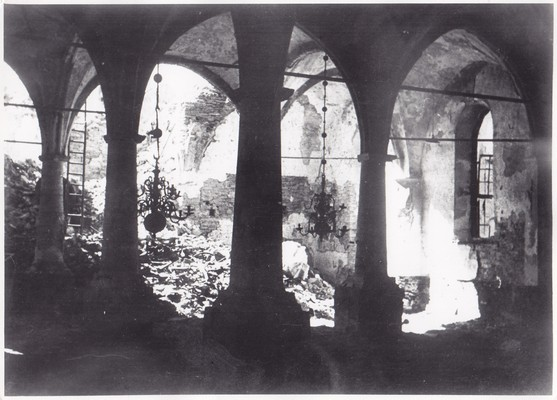
The damaged St. Johns Church in Narva in 1944

- February 1 - Minor damage inflicted on buildings, 85% of the city's population was evacuated.
- March 1 - <200 bombs were dropped onto the city.
- March 6-8 - Known as the March bombings, many buildings were destroyed and considered uninhabitable.
- March 17-19 - The remaining ruins were bombed.
- July 25 - Most of the city was destroyed.

== Damages ==
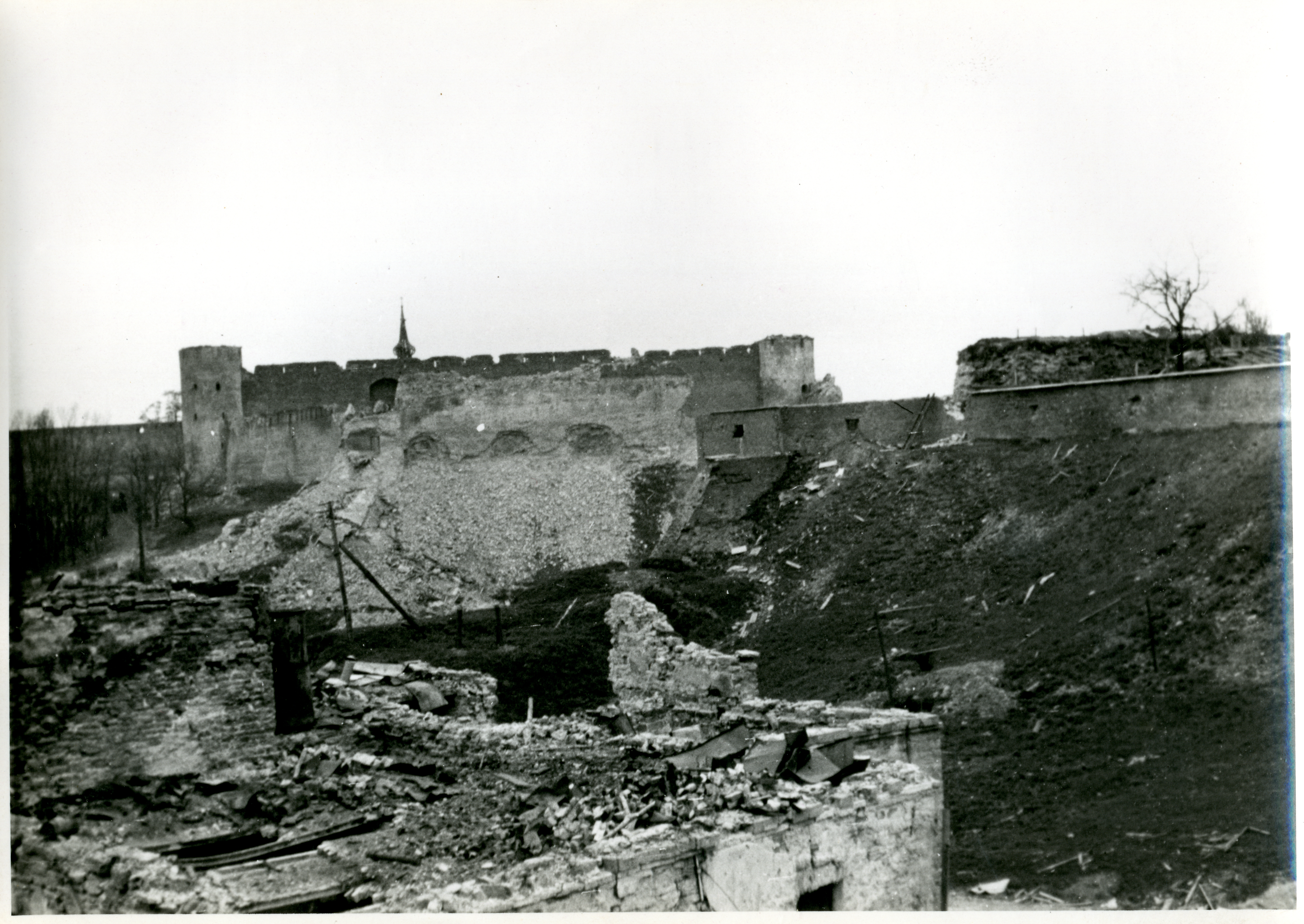
The damaged Hermann Castle in 1944

=== Architectural casualties ===
Many buildings were destroyed during the air raids and general engagements in and around Narva. At the start of 1944, around 10% of Narva was destroyed, but in late July, 95-98% of the city was destroyed. After World War II, some buildings were able to be restored, but in the 1950s, Soviet authorities removed many ruins of Narva to build apartment buildings.

Narva's medieval town, dating back to the late 1600's, was almost entirely destroyed. Only a few structures were restored; the Narva Town Hall and the Hermann Castle.

=== Human casualties ===
Civilian casualties were fairly low, due to the evacuation which evacuated 85% of the city's population. Around 900 people died during the actual air raids during 1944. In 1939, Narva's total population measured 22,400, but in 1945, the city's population measured ~6,600. This significant decrease is mainly due to evacuations, but also due to deportations, refugees, relocations, and other deaths during the war.

== See also ==
- Bombing of Tallinn in World War II
- Battle of Narva
- Estonia in World War II
