= Riga offensive (1944) =

Soviet offensive against Nazi Germany during World War II

- Part of the Baltic offensive during the Eastern Front (World War II)
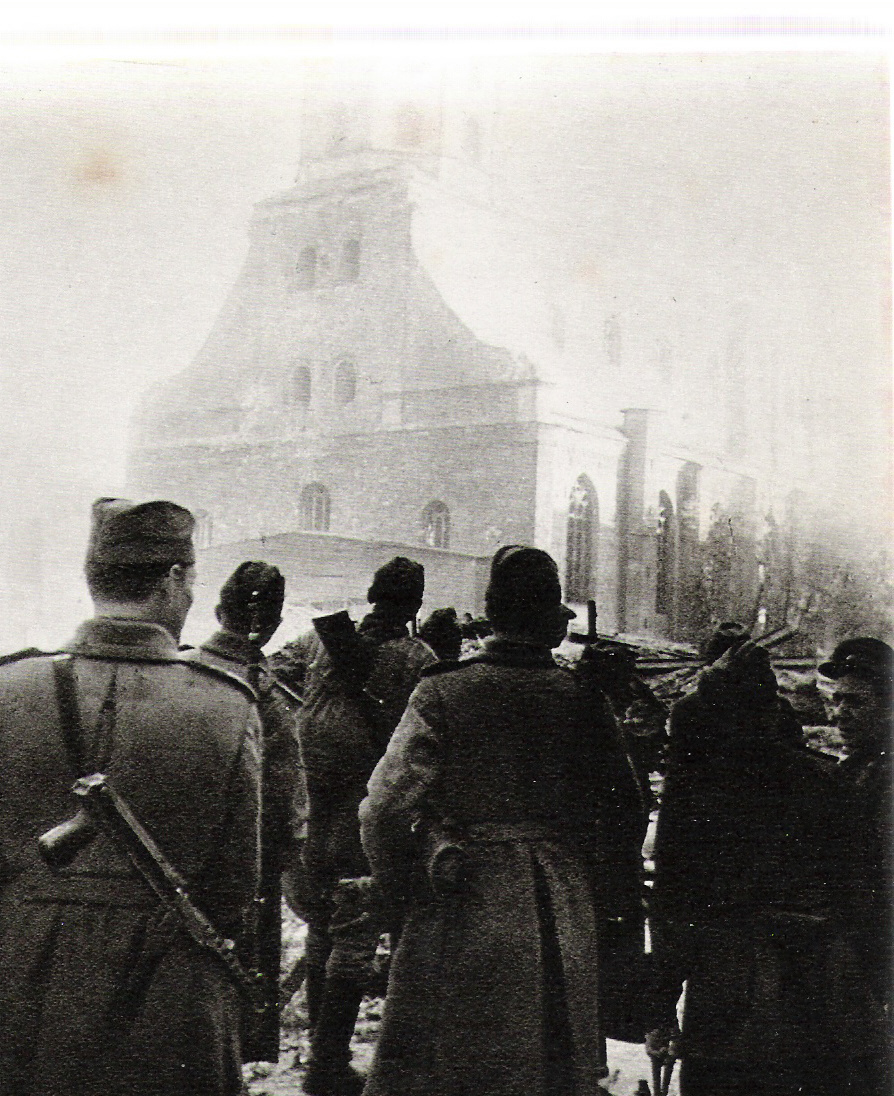
- Soviet troops in Riga looking at the St. Peter's Church, October 1944
Date	September 14 – October 24, 1944
Location	Latvia, Estonia 56°58′N 24°19′E
Result	Soviet victory

Belligerents
(Nazi Germany) Germany	Soviet Union

Commanders and leaders
Ferdinand Schörner	Ivan Bagramyan; Andrei Yeremenko; Ivan Maslennikov

The Riga offensive (Russian: Рижская наступательная операция, lit. 'Riga offensive operation') was part of the larger Baltic offensive on the Eastern Front during World War II. It took place late in 1944, and drove German forces from the city of Riga.

== Prelude ==
Soviet forces had advanced towards the Baltic coast in the beginning of their Tartu offensive and at the end of the highly successful Belorussian offensive (Operation Bagration), during July and August 1944, and at one point had broken through to the Gulf of Riga. The victories in July were highly unexpected, and at one point on July 31, the commander of the 8th mechanized brigade communicated with corps headquarters to notify them that its tanks had reached the beach. In an unusual act, they were ordered to fill several bottles of sea water, have them signed, and flown to The Kremlin as proof that Army Group North had been cut off from the Reich. During August, the German 18th Army had mounted a counter-attack, Operation Doppelkopf. Simultaneously the German Valga–Võrtsjärv line, supported by the local Estonian Omakaitse militia battalions, repelled the heavy pressure of the Soviet 3rd Baltic Front's Tartu offensive. The German Army Group North's commander, Ferdinand Schörner designed Operation Aster to pull his troops out of mainland Estonia. The parallel Riga offensive would see Soviet forces apply further pressure on Army Group North, which still held much of Latvia and Estonia.

== Deployments ==
=== Red Army ===
Elements of:

- 1st Baltic Front (General Ivan Bagramyan)
- 2nd Baltic Front (General Andrei Yeremenko)
  - 22nd Army
- 3rd Baltic Front (General Ivan Maslennikov)

=== German and affiliated forces ===
- Army Group North (General Ferdinand Schoerner)
  - Sixteenth Army (General Carl Hilpert)
  - Eighteenth Army (General Ehrenfried-Oskar Boege)
- Elements of Army Group Centre temporarily reassigned to Army Group North
  - Third Panzer Army (General Erhard Raus)
- Omakaitse

== The offensive ==
The Soviet forces launched a ferocious attack on the Riga axis on September 14, 1944. Within 4 days, the German 16th Army had suffered serious damage, while in the 18th Army's sector, ten of the eighteen German divisions had been reduced to the Kampfgruppe level. In the northern segment placed along Lake Võrtsjärv, and the Väike Emajõgi and Gauja rivers, the Soviet 3rd Baltic Front attacked the German XXVIII Army Corps backed by Omakaitse battalions. In fierce battles, the German and Estonian units held their positions.

From the south, the 43rd Army was threatening the approaches to Riga itself, where the German X Corps had been shattered. Schoerner began to move his divisions into the Courland Peninsula, intending to shorten the front and pull back from Riga. A counter-attack was carried out by the XXXIX Panzer Corps of 3rd Panzer Army, temporarily placed under Schörner's overall command, but the Soviet opposition was too strong.

In the meantime, Stavka had been preparing a new axis of attack under the cover of a further push towards Riga, the new plan being put forward in a directive of September 24. On September 27, the 16th Army began to report Soviet traffic away from its front, to the south-west. In fact, several major Soviet force concentrations (notably the 4th Shock and 51st Armies) were being shifted southwards in preparation for a major thrust westwards towards Memel by the 1st Baltic Front. German intelligence detected the movement of several of the armies involved, but were unable to detect their destination.

The resulting offensive, the Battle of Memel, was launched on October 5; Bagramyan's 1st Baltic Front shattered the Third Panzer Army, finally severing the land connection between the German Army Group Centre and Army Group North. Schoerner's forces around Riga and in Courland were now cut off.

On October 9, Schoerner signalled that he would attack towards Memel and try and re-establish the land connection if Riga could be evacuated. Soviet forces were again moving forwards outside Riga, and brought the city within the range of artillery fire on October 10. Leaving a screening force of the 227th Infantry Division and the guns of the 6th Motorized Anti-Aircraft Division, the 18th Army retreated through Riga into Courland, destroying bridges on its route. Riga was taken by forces of the 3rd Baltic Front on October 13. Over the next few days Soviet units were reported in action to the west of Riga, stating that German forces had been cleared from the eastern bank of the Lielupe River by October 17.

== Aftermath ==
Army Group North had been driven into the Courland Pocket, where it remained isolated until the end of the war in Europe.

== Citations and references ==
=== Cited sources ===
- Glantz, D. Soviet Military Deception in the Second World War, Frank Cass, London, 1989, ISBN 0-7146-3347-X
- Mitcham, Samuel W. (2007). The German Defeat in the East, 1944–45. Mechanicsburg, PA: Stackpole Books. ISBN 978-0-8117-3371-7.
