= 118th Guards Rifle Division =

- Active: 1945–1946; 1950–1956
- Country: Soviet Union
- Branch: Red Army (1945-46); Soviet Army (1950-56)
- Type: Division
- Role: Infantry
- Garrison/HQ: Pärnu
- Decorations: Order of the Red Banner
- Battle honours: Tallinn

Commanders
- Notable commanders: Maj. Gen. Karl Adamovich Allikas; Maj. Gen. Johan Yakovlevich Lombak

The 118th Estonian Guards Rifle Division was an elite infantry division of the Red Army and later the Soviet Army. It was formed following the German surrender in June 1945 from the 2nd wartime formation of the 7th Estonian Rifle Division. The division became a brigade in 1946 and became a division again in 1950. It was disbanded in 1956.

== History ==
The division was formed on June 28, 1945 from the re-designated 7th Estonian Rifle Division. On the same date the entire 8th Estonian Rifle Corps was raised to Guards status as the 41st Guards Rifle Corps. On its formation the 118th Guards inherited the honorific title and decoration of the 7th, with its full title being 118th Guards Rifle Estonian, Tallinn, Order of the Red Banner Division. The division was commanded by Maj. Gen. Karl Adamovich Allikas, who had commanded the 7th Estonian Rifle Division since January 6, 1943.

This re-designation took place nearly two months after V-E Day, but before the Soviet invasion of Manchuria, so technically the 118th Guards can be considered a wartime formation, although it did not see combat in Manchuria. In February 1946 General Allikas was replaced in command by Maj. Gen. Johan Yakovlevich Lombak, who had previously commanded the 249th Estonian Rifle Division (later 122nd Guards Rifle Division).

The division was downsized into the 22nd Guards Separate Rifle Brigade in 1946. It was based at Pärnu.

The division was reformed from the 22nd Guards Separate Rifle Brigade in 1950, and served until 1956 with 4th Guards Rifle Corps (the 10th Guards Army previously), before being disbanded again on July 7, 1956 at Tallinn.
