= Tallinn offensive =

Strategic offensive during WWII

- Part of Eastern Front (World War II)
- Soviet paratroopers in Tallinn in a captured Sd.Kfz. 251
Date	17–26 September 1944
Location	Estonia
Result	Soviet victory

Belligerents
Germany: Estonian conscripts, auxiliary police, border guards and militia	Soviet Union	(Estonia) Estonian pro-independence troops

Commanders and leaders
Ferdinand Schörner	Leonid Govorov	Johan Pitka

Strength
50,000 troops 50 vessels	195,000 troops	2,000 troops

The Tallinn offensive (Russian: Таллинская наступательная операция) was a strategic offensive by the Red Army's 2nd Shock Army and 8th Army and the Baltic Fleet against the German Army Detachment Narwa and Estonian units in mainland Estonia on the Eastern Front of World War II on 17–26 September 1944. Its German counterpart was the abandonment of the Estonian territory in a retreat codenamed Operation Aster (German: Unternehmen Aster).

The Soviet offensive commenced with the 2nd Shock Army breaching the defence of the II Army Corps along the Emajõgi River in the vicinity of Tartu. The defenders managed to slow the Soviet advance sufficiently enough for Army Detachment Narwa to be evacuated from mainland Estonia in an orderly fashion. On 18 September, the constitutional Government of Estonia captured the government buildings in Tallinn from the Germans and the city was abandoned by the German forces by 22 September. The Leningrad Front seized the capital and took the rest of mainland Estonia by 26 September 1944.

== Background ==
=== Prelude ===
Attacks by the Leningrad Front had pushed Army Group North west of Lake Peipus, resulting in a series of operations around Narva. In the south, Soviet forces had advanced towards the Baltic coast at the end of Operation Bagration the Belorussian strategic offensive (June–August 1944) against Army Group Centre. The Soviet Tallinn offensive was designed as a part of the Baltic offensive to eliminate the positions of Army Group North along the Baltic.

Stavka began an intricate supply and transport operation, to move the 2nd Shock Army from the Narva front to the Emajõgi river on September 5, 1944. The 25th River Boat Brigade and engineer troops were ordered by Stavka to ferry the units over Lake Peipus. Five crossings were built from the Russian settlement of Pnevo across the 2 km (1.2 mi)-wide sound of Lämmijärv to the Estonian village of Mehikoorma. Forty-six vessels worked 24 hours a day to carry 135,000 troops, 13,200 horses, 9,100 lorries, 2,183 artillery and 8,300 tons of ammunition across the lake. Luftwaffe units observed the move without intervening. The 2nd Shock Army acquired command over the Emajõgi front from the 3rd Baltic Front on 11 September 1944.

The three Soviet Baltic Fronts launched their Riga offensive operation on 14 September, along the German 18th Army front segment from the town of Madona in Latvia to the mouth of the Väike Emajõgi river. In the Estonian section, from the Valga railway junction to Lake Võrtsjärv, the Soviet 3rd Baltic Front attacked the German XXVIII Army Corps. The German and Estonian Omakaitse units held their positions and prevented the Army Detachment Narwa from being encircled in Estonia.

=== Soviet objectives ===
The Soviet forces attempted to capture Estonia and its capital Tallinn. Stavka hoped a quick breakthrough at the Emajõgi front would open a path for the armoured units to the north, thus cutting the Army Detachment Narwa off from the rest of Army Group North. The Red Army command presumed that the main direction of retreat for the German forces would be Tallinn, and concentrated their forces there in an attempt to block the roads.

=== German objectives ===
Army Group North had already considered abandoning Estonia in February 1944, during the Soviet Kingisepp-Gdov offensive. A large number of units would have been freed up with changes to the front, but the Narva front continued to be defended on Hitler's orders. The German Command considered it important to maintain control over the southern shore of the Gulf of Finland to ease the situation in Finland and keep the Soviet Baltic Fleet trapped in the eastern bay of the gulf. Retaining the oil shale reserves and oil shale industry in Ida-Viru was important for economic reasons.

The exit of Finland from the war on 3 September provided the political impetus for abandoning Estonia. The next day, Generaloberst Heinz Guderian suggested that it would not be possible to hold Ostland and ordered plans for the evacuation operation, codenamed Königsberg, to be drawn up. Hitler, however, declared that Ostland must not be given up at any cost, since doing so would provide support to those Finns that did not favour the new course of the government, and would influence Sweden to maintain its current foreign policy. After lunch, Guderian ordered that the Königsberg plan nevertheless be secretly initiated. On the next day, Oberst Natzmer visited the headquarters of Army Detachment Narwa to discuss details of the evacuation. On 11 September, the evacuation of Estonia was discussed in the Army Headquarters at length. On 15 September, the Commander-in-Chief of the Army Group, Generaloberst Ferdinand Schörner, requested that Guderian convince Hitler to order the evacuation of German troops from the continental part of Estonia, codenamed Operation Aster. Schörner emphasised that although the front was still holding, delaying the order would mean the units in Estonia would be trapped. Hitler agreed on 16 September.

According to the plan, the main forces of Army Group Narwa had to withdraw mainly through Viljandi and Pärnu to Riga. In order to do that, the II Army Corps at the Emajõgi front and XXVIII Army Corps at the Väike Emajõgi had to keep the front line stable until the Army Detachment had passed behind them. Officially, the beginning of the operation was supposed to be September 19. The retreat was to be gradual, over several lines of resistance. The withdrawal was to be backed mainly by the units consisting of Estonians, who, by the estimates of the German army command, would not have wanted to leave Estonia anyway. A naval force under Vice-Admiral Theodor Burchardi began evacuating elements of the German formations along with some civilians on 17 September. The headquarters prepared a detailed plan to leave their positions at the Narva front on the night of 18–19 September.

=== Estonian objectives ===
Various Estonian troops, which used men who had deserted from the 20th Waffen Grenadier Division of the SS (1st Estonian), Omakaitse militia, border defence and auxiliary police battalions, had no general planning. However, their aim was to defend the independence of Estonia.

== Comparison of forces ==
By the beginning of the Tallinn offensive on 17 September at the Emajõgi front, the II German Army Corps was reduced to a modest division of 4,600 men, while defending against the 140,000 men of the 2nd Shock Army. While the II Army Corps had practically no armoured forces, the 3rd Baltic Front deployed 300 armoured vehicles. The Red Army placed 2,569 artillery pieces along the 90-kilometre front line, pitting 137 pieces of artillery per kilometre against a practically nonexistent German artillery. The 15,000 strong III SS (Germanic) Panzer Corps stood against the Soviet 8th Army numbering 55,000 troops at the Narva front. The pro-independence Estonian troops numbered 2,000.

== Operations ==
The 3rd Baltic Front commenced their offensive in the early morning of 17 September. After the German II Army Corps were subjected to an artillery barrage of 132,500 shells, the three leading rifle corps crossed the Emajõgi River in the 25 km long section of the front east of Tartu and breached the defences. The 2nd Shock Army forced its way through to the German divisional headquarters and artillery positions. Only Kampfgruppe Rebane, stationed near Tartu, held their frontage, albeit with heavy losses. Army Detachment Narwa and XXVIII Corps, the northernmost elements of Army Group North, were at risk of getting encircled and destroyed. General Ferdinand Schörner ordered II Army Corps to abandon the defence of the Emajõgi and to move quickly around the northern tip of Lake Võrtsjärv to Latvia.

Six Estonian border defence regiments, the 113th Security Regiment, and remnants of the 20th Waffen SS Division retreating from the most distant part of the Narva front in the Krivasoo swamp were blocked by the advance units of the 8th Estonian Rifle Corps and destroyed in the battles of Porkuni and Avinurme on 20 and 21 September. Estonians of the Soviet rifle corps murdered their compatriots that had been taken prisoner at Porkuni and the wounded sheltering in the Avinurme Parish church.

The defence allowed Army Detachment Narwa to escape from Estonia as the III (Germanic) SS Panzer Corps and the 11th Infantry Division abandoned their positions, unbeknownst to the Soviet 8th Army. The Soviet forces began advancing in the early morning, took Jõhvi, and by evening reached the Toila–Jõhvi–Kurtna line, also taking 63 POWs. The Panzer Corps itself declared 30 dead or MIA, and 30 wounded. On the night of 20 September, the headquarters of the Corps were near Pärnu on the southwestern coast, alongside the "Nederland", "Nordland" and the 11th Infantry Division headquarters. The "Nordland" and the 11th Infantry divisions were sent to Latvia, under the command of the 16th Army. The "Nederland" was left to organise the defence of Pärnu. On 23 September, "Nederland" dynamited the harbour and retreated to Latvia. On 24 September near Ikla on the Latvian border the rearguard of the "Nederland" carried out its final battle on Estonian ground, destroying 12–15 Soviet tanks.

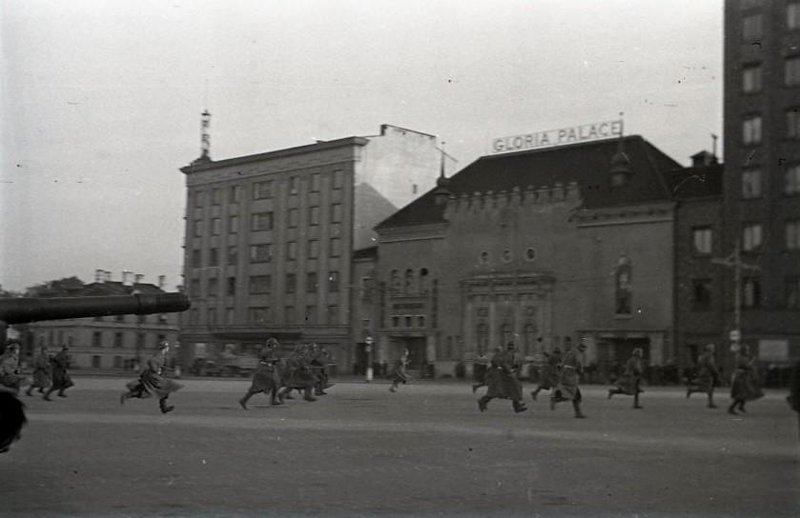
Soviet troops running across Freedom Square in Tallinn

Wehrmacht military personnel, the wounded, institutions and industries, prisoners and Estonian civilians were mostly evacuated by sea. The chief of evacuation for the navy was the Admiral of the Eastern Baltic Sea, Theodor Burchardi. He was mainly responsible for securing the evacuation from Tallinn and Paldiski. For this purpose, he commanded the 24th Landing Flotilla, 14th Security Flotilla, 31st Mine Trawler Flotilla, 5th Security Flotilla and 1st Evacuation Flotilla, with a total of approximately 50 small warships, launches, escort ships and other vessels. Within six days, around 50,000 troops, 20,000 civilians, 1,000 POWs and 30,000 tons of goods were removed from Estonia, 38,000 of the military personnel by sea. In the course of the evacuation from Tallinn, the following ships suffered serious damage from Soviet Air Forces attacks: on board the Nettelbeck and Vp 1611, 8 people killed and 29 wounded; the RO-22 hit and 100 personnel killed. On 22 September 1944, the hospital ship Moero, with 1,155 refugees, wounded and crew on board, sunk in the middle of the Baltic sea with 637 dead. The evacuation by sea, despite the fact that the time for evacuation was much shorter than planned, was considered a complete success, with only 0.9% of the evacuees killed.

Soviet troops riding ISU-152 self-propelled guns through Freedom Square in Tallinn

On 18 September 1944, the provisional government formed by the National Committee of the Republic of Estonia in Tallinn re-declared the independence of Estonia. Estonian military units clashed with German troops in Tallinn, seizing the state offices at Toompea. The government appealed to the Soviet Union to recognize the independence of the republic.

The Government of Estonia had failed to concentrate the Estonian soldiers retreating from the Narva and Emajõgi fronts, as the units were scattered and mixed with the German detachments withdrawing towards Latvia. Therefore, the government lacked significant military forces to repulse the Soviet forces concentrated around Tallinn. The units securing the national capital and the government included a command led by Rear Admiral Johan Pitka, one of the former battalions of the Finnish Infantry Regiment 200 and various units of the Omakaitse, all of those under nominal command of general Jaan Maide. The government managed to establish contact with a group of Estonian SS troops retreating from Narva front, but those were dispersed in the Battle of Porkuni.

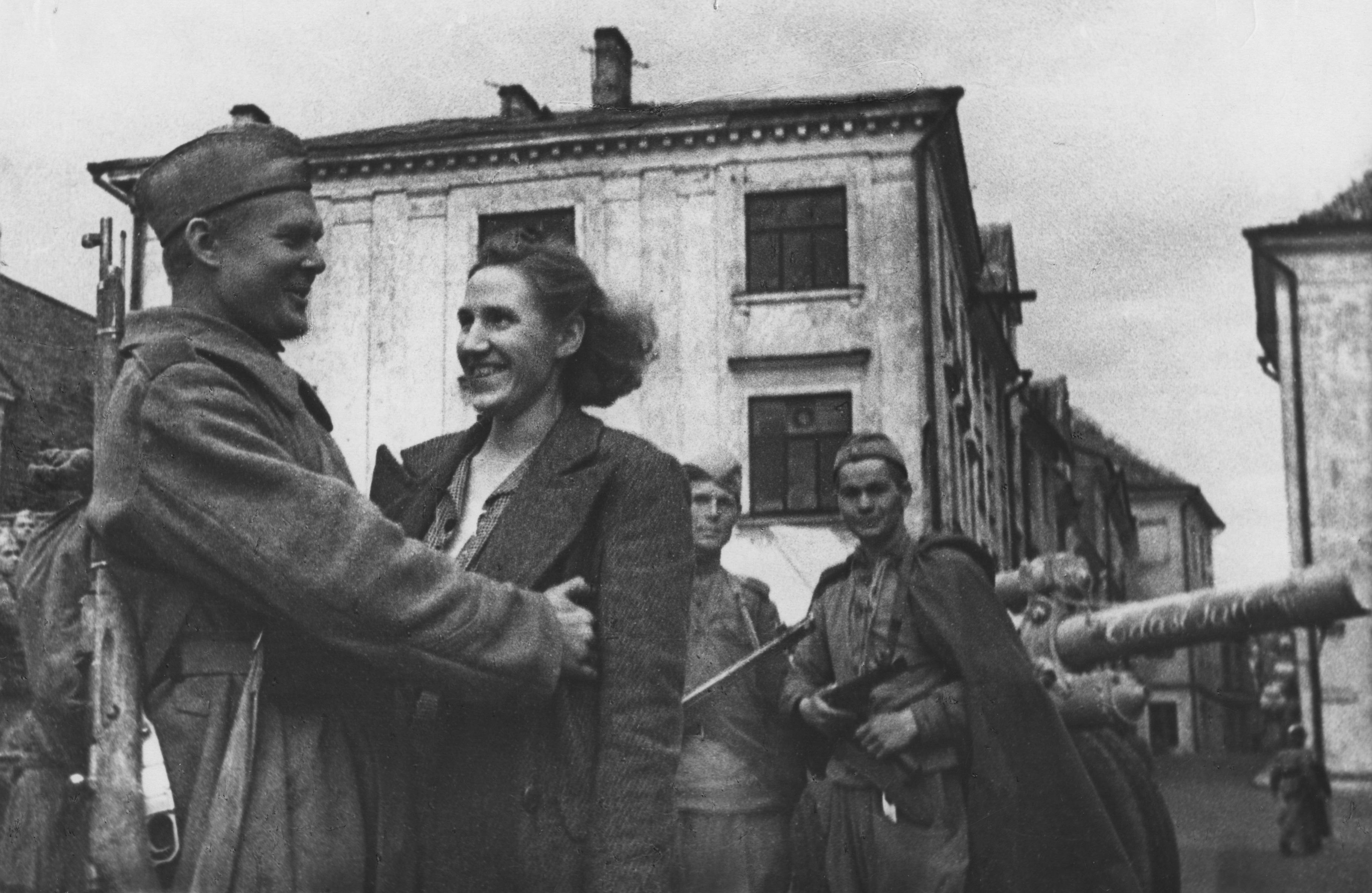
A soldier of the 8th Estonian Rifle Corps embraces his wife on the streets of Tallinn

By the time the advance units of the Leningrad Front arrived at Tallinn early on 22 September, German troops had practically abandoned the city and the streets were empty. The last German unit to leave Tallinn that morning was the 531st Navy Artillery Battalion. Before embarkation, all stationary artillery and armaments, special equipment, guns that could not be evacuated, ammunition, the telephone exchange, the radio broadcast house, locomotives and railroad cars, and the railway were destroyed. The Tallinn power plant was fired upon from the sea and the Old City Harbour was destroyed. The retreating German units had no combat contact with the Red Army in Tallinn, only the Estonian units resisted.

Troops of the Leningrad Front seized Tallinn on 22 September. Jüri Uluots, acting President of Estonia, fled to Sweden. In the following days, several pro-independence Estonian battle groups attacked the Soviet troops in Harju and Lääne counties without success.

== Aftermath ==
The German evacuation had been carried out in an orderly fashion. Army Group North's plans had paid off and both the Soviets and the Oberkommando der Wehrmacht (German High Command) was surprised and impressed by the speed of the evacuation. The 8th Army went on to take the remaining West Estonian islands (Moonsund archipelago) in the Moonsund Landing Operation, an amphibious attack. Overall, the Baltic offensive resulted in the expulsion of German forces from Estonia, Lithuania and a large part of Latvia.

=== Soviet reoccupation ===
Soviet rule of Estonia was re-established by force, and sovietisation followed, which was mostly carried out in 1944–1950. The forced collectivisation of agriculture began in 1947, and was completed after the mass deportation of Estonians in March 1949. All private farms were confiscated, and farmers were made to join the collective farms. An armed resistance movement of 'forest brothers' was active until the mass deportations. A total of 30,000 participated or supported the movement; 2,000 were killed. The Soviet authorities fighting the forest brothers suffered also hundreds of deaths. Among those killed on both sides were innocent civilians. Besides the armed resistance of the forest brothers, a number of underground nationalist schoolchildren groups were active. Most of their members were sentenced to long terms of imprisonment.

The punitive actions decreased rapidly after Joseph Stalin's death in March 1953. From 1956 to 1958, a large part of the deportees and political prisoners were allowed to return to Estonia. Political arrests and numerous other kind of crimes against humanity were committed all through the occupation period until the late 1980s. After all, the attempt to integrate Estonian society into the Soviet system failed. Although the armed resistance was defeated, the population remained anti-Soviet. This helped the Estonians to organise a new resistance movement in the late 1980s, regain their independence in 1991, and then rapidly develop a democratic society.
