= 72nd Mountain Rifle Division =

WW2 Red Army formation

- Active: 1941
- Country: Soviet Union
- Branch: Red Army
- Type: Division
- Role: Mountain Infantry
- Engagements: Operation Barbarossa; Battle of Uman

Commanders
- Notable commanders: Maj. Gen. Pavel Ivanovich Abramidze

The 72nd Mountain Rifle Division was formed as a specialized infantry division of the Red Army in the spring of 1941, based on the 72nd Rifle Division (1936 formation) which had previously been the 4th Turkestan Division. At the time of the German invasion on June 22 it was located on the San River west of Lviv as part of the 8th Rifle Corps of 26th Army in the Kiev Special Military District. After having about half of its complement removed to Army reserves or transferred to other divisions it was forced to fall back through western Ukraine under pressure from the German 17th Army until early August when it was encircled as part of 12th Army near Uman. After about five more days of fighting the 72nd Mountain had been effectively destroyed and it was officially disbanded a month later. It was never reformed.

== Formation ==
The 4th Turkestan Division was redesignated as the 72nd Rifle Division in July 1936 in common with the other "national" divisions and similar formations in the Red Army. In 1939 it was in the 13th Rifle Corps of Ukrainian Front's 12th Army and took part in the Soviet invasion of Poland; following this it was moved north to participate in the Winter War. The division was officially converted on April 24, 1941 based on the prewar shtat (table of organization and equipment) for mountain rifle divisions, which among other things required the formation of a fourth rifle regiment:

- 14th Mountain Rifle Regiment
- 133rd Mountain Rifle Regiment
- 187th Mountain Rifle Regiment
- 309th Mountain Rifle Regiment
- 9th Artillery Regiment
- 33rd Howitzer Artillery Regiment
- 119th Antitank Battalion
- 309th Antiaircraft Battalion
- 40th Reconnaissance Battalion
- 3rd Sapper Battalion
- 55th Signal Battalion
- 51st Medical/Sanitation Battalion
- 10th Chemical Protection (Anti-gas) Company
- 37th Artillery Park Battalion
- 73rd Motor Transport Battalion
- 71st Field Bakery (motorized)
- 214th (later 176th) Field Postal Station
- 396th Field Office of the State Bank

The division was commanded by Maj. Gen. Pavel Ivanovich Abramidze, who had been the 72nd Rifle's commander since August 8, 1940. It was one of six rifle divisions converted to mountain divisions in Ukraine in late 1940/early 1941; like the rest it received little or no specialized training or equipment before the invasion began and, in fact, never completed its conversion. As of June 22 it had on hand 9,904 officers and men with 7,462 bolt-action rifles and carbines, 2,579 semiautomatic rifles, 365 sub-machine guns, 351 light machine guns, 110 heavy machine guns, 54 45 mm antitank guns, 38 76 mm cannon and howitzers, 24 122 mm howitzers and 150 mortars. For transport it had 433 trucks and 44 tractors plus 2,112 horses. The number of antitank guns indicates it had a regular rifle division's full antitank battalion plus antitank sections in at least three of its rifle regiments, contrary to the mountain division shtat.

== Combat History ==
As the Axis invasion began the 26th Army was still forming and had only three divisions (8th Rifle Corps with the 72nd Mountain, 99th and 173rd Rifle Divisions) and the 8th Fortified Region on strength. To provide itself with some sort of reserve the Army headquarters removed the 133rd and 309th Mountain Regiments from the front lines and the latter apparently never rejoined the division. On June 23 part of the division's artillery was also removed to support the 99th Division and frontier guards' efforts to keep the German forces out of Lviv and Przemyśl.

By July 10 the truncated 72nd Mountain had left 8th Corps but was still in retreat through western Ukraine with 26th Army of Southwestern Front. As of the end of the next day it was on a line east of Proskuriv facing the 97th Jäger Division and 4th Mountain Division of German 17th Army. On July 12 the division rejoined the 8th Corps as it was transferred to the 12th Army under command of Southern Front, and by the end of July 14 it was positioned on the north bank of the Southern Bug River west of Khmilnyk.

As Army Group South began the drive that led to the encirclement battle around Uman the 72nd Mountain was southwest of Lypovets on July 23, now facing the 295th Infantry Division. By August 2 the 12th and 6th Armies had been pocketed and although efforts were made both to break in and to break out only a small number of Soviet troops were able to escape. General Abramidze was captured on August 8; he survived the war as a PoW and went on to serve in administrative roles in Tbilisi until his retirement in 1956. The 72nd Mountain Rifle Division was officially stricken from the Red Army order of battle on September 19, about a month after it had ceased to exist.
