= Battle of Porkuni =

1944 World War II battle

Coordinates: 59°10′40″N 26°09′37″E

- Part of World War II
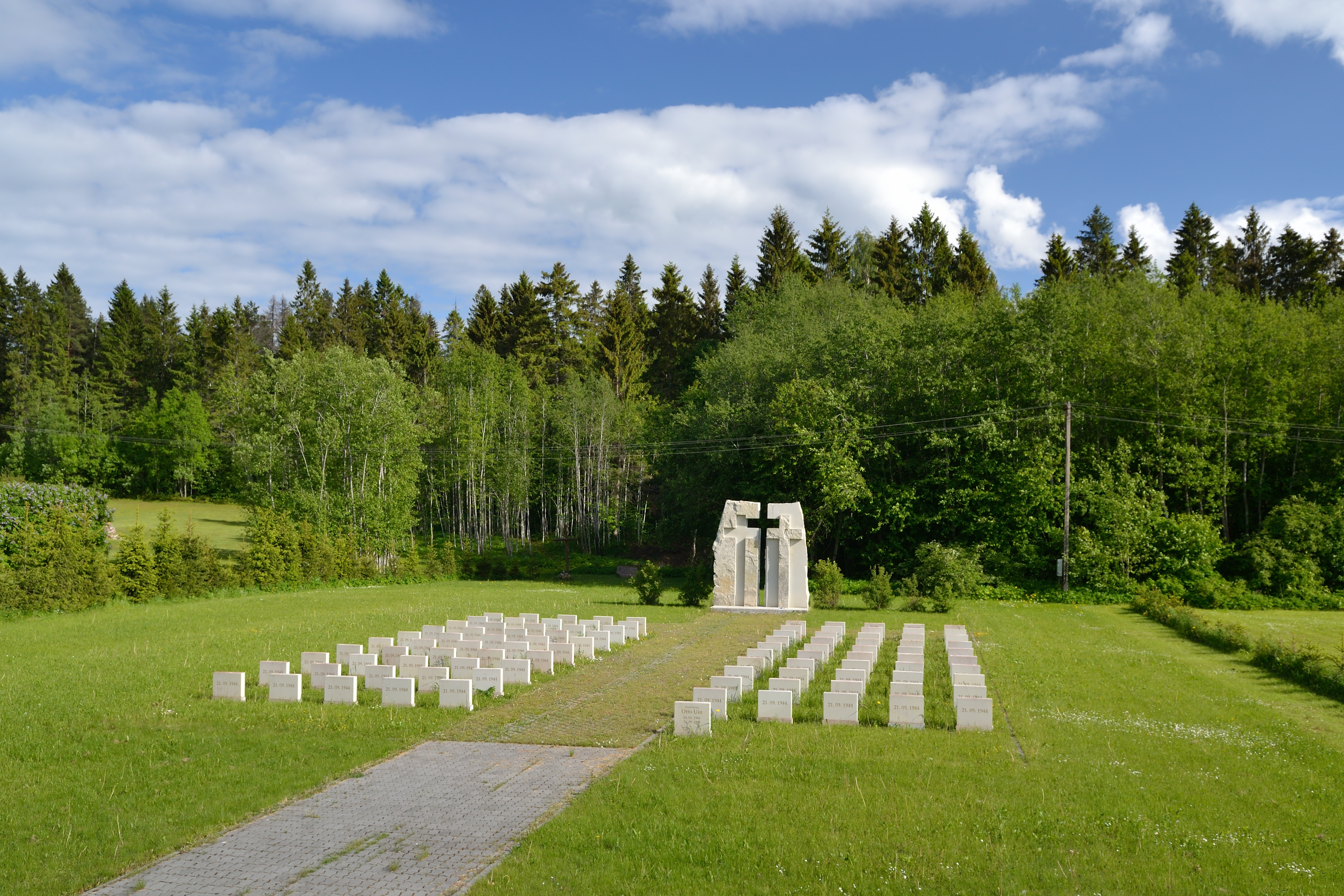
| Date | September 21, 1944 |
| Location | Porkuni, Viru County, Estonia |
| Result | Soviet victory |

Belligerents
| Estonian conscripts | Soviet Union |

Commanders and leaders
| Juhan Vermet | (Soviet Union) August Feldman |

Strength
| 1,500 | 10,000 |

Casualties and losses
| 500 dead, 700 captured | ~unknown |

Battle of Porkuni (Estonian: Porkuni lahing) was the largest engagement between Estonians serving in the Red Army and Estonian pro-independence and Waffen-SS units. It took place on 21 September 1944 between Lake Porkuni and the village of Sauvälja about seven kilometres northeast of the town of Tamsalu during the Leningrad Front's Tallinn Offensive Operation (17 September 1944 – 26 September 1944).

The 249th Rifle Regiment of the 8th Estonian Rifle Corps had heavy machine guns and mortars and were supported by artillery and tanks. Soldiers of the Estonian Waffen Grenadier Division had only light arms and antitank weapons in the form of German panzerfausts.

The 8th Rifle Corps surrounded about 1,500 Estonians retreating from the Tannenberg line in the Sinimäed Hills. In the ensuing battle, more than 500 surrounded Estonians were killed. Around 700 were captured.

Several groups of Estonians led by Obersturmführer Hando Ruus managed to break out the Soviet encirclement and escape towards west. However, on September 22, the largest group was taken by surprise in a forest near Ambla and most of the men were taken prisoner or killed.

Villagers buried 273 dead Estonians in German uniform. The Soviet Rifle Corps lost 73 men killed, of whom 57 had Estonian names.
