= Pelaheia Lytvynova =

Ukrainian folklorist (1833–1904)

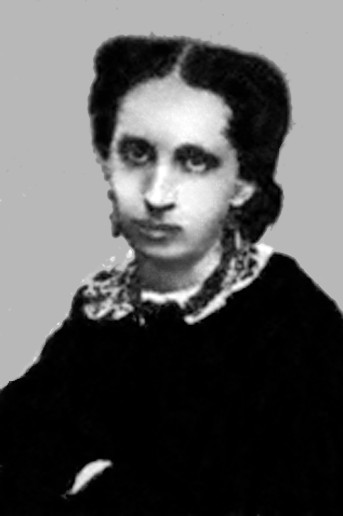

Pelaheia or Polina Yakivna Lytvynova-Bartosh (1833–1904) was a Ukrainian ethnographer and folklorist.

== Childhood and education ==
Bartosh was born in the village of Tereben (Terebenka, Terebeni) near the village of Zemlyanka, Glukhovsky Uyezd, Chernihiv Governorate. Her father was Yakov Yakovlevich Bartosh, a small landowner. In some sources, Bartosh's birthplace is given as the town of Khmilnyk.

Bartosh's mother - Elizabeth Fyodorovna - came from a noble family of Tumansky. She was the granddaughter of the writer, translator and publisher, member of the Russian Academy of Sciences Fedor Yosypovich Tumansky.

Bartosh's grew up in the Podolsk town of Khmilnyk. She was orphaned by the death of her mother and father. She studied first at the private boarding school of GK Serebryakova in Shostka and then from 1847 to 1852 at the Moscow Elizabethan Institute for Noble Girls.

== Marriage and family life ==
In 1853, Bartosh married Chernihiv landowner Petro Lytvynov, nephew of historian and ethnographer Oleksandr Markovych. The couple had 10 children (7 sons and 3 daughters). She lived on her husband's estate in the village of Bogdanove (now part of the village of Poloshky, Hlukhiv district, Sumy region). She personally managed the upbringing and education of children. From the mid-1860s, when the children grew up, she lived at their place of study - in Hlukhiv, Novgorod-Siversky, Nizhyn, Kyiv and Moscow.

In the 1870s, Lytvynova-Bartosh became recognised in Ukrainian public life. She worked in various fields - helping run shelters for women and children - and regularly participated in discussions of topical issues of the public. Emphasizing the so-called "women's issue", Lytvynova-Bartosh repeatedly raised the issue of the need to improve women's position in society at the time and the issue of gender equality in general.

== Teaching ==
During 1870–1871, Lytvynova-Bartosh attended the Lubyanka Guerrilla Courses in Moscow. In 1872, returning to Kiev, she received a teaching certificate and in 1875 opened a primary school in Kiev. Pelageya Yakivna organized textbooks for school students: "Alphabet for public schools" and "Stories for children". In her pedagogical activity, she was guided primarily by the method of Konstantin Ushinsky. She believed that children of different social backgrounds should study according to the same programs and textbooks. Trying to adapt her "Alphabet" to the needs of Ukrainian children, Lytvynova-Bartosh wrote it in an understandable language. The textbook contained the alphabet, syllables, sentences, spellings of figures and illustrations, but the texts of prayers were removed. However, despite the advanced views of Lytvynova-Bartosh and the implementation of her progressive pedagogical methods in teaching their students, this educational institution, without stable funding, did not last long.

One of Lytvynova-Bartosh's first publications was an article refuting erroneous biographical information about F. Tumansky in the St. Petersburg Gazette (1875).

== Folklore ==
Throughout her life Lytvynova-Bartosh collected samples of folk ornaments, drew patterns of embroidery, weaving, drawings on tiles, ceramics, wood, painted Easter eggs, towels, tablecloths. The result of fruitful research work was the first volume of "South-Russian folk ornament", published in 1878. The collection includes 20 tables with samples of ornaments for embroidery, weaving and Easter painting, collected in Hlukhiv district of Chernihiv province.

Working on the study of local ethnographic material, Lytvynova-Bartosh published in 1879 the work "Collection of folk Russian patterns for women's needlework", which contained a preface and 10 tables of illustrative material. In the spring of 1902 she published the second volume of "South-Russian folk ornament", which was highly praised by contemporaries. The collection includes 20 tables with samples of ornaments for embroidery, weaving, carpet weaving and Easter painting, collected in four counties of Chernihiv province (Starodub, Novgorod-Siversky, Krolevets and Kontop).

At the beginning In the 1880s she rented an apartment in Hlukhiv for about three years in the house of the parents of the future academician M. Vasylenko.

After the death of her sister in 1886, she inherited a hamlet in the village Zemlyanka (now a village in Hlukhiv district). Lytvynova-Bartosh lived there until the end of her days. Living mainly in the provinces, she studied folk beliefs, crafts and occupations (weaving, fishing, cooking), collected oral folk art, Easter eggs, towels, sheets, patterns of folk embroidery and more. She studied folk medicine, conditions for raising children, home crafts of peasants. Lytvynova-Bartosh also compiled a description of the ancient Ukrainian holidays of the winter cycle of the national calendar.

Lytvynova-Bartosh published several albums of folk patterns and a number of posts, articles and memoirs in the magazine "Kiev Antiquity".

Lytvynova-Bartosh also translated comedies by Molière's: George Dandin ou le Mari confondu (entitled "Gritsko Dendrik, or Odarchin's Man") and "The Doctor Involuntarily" ("The Sorcerer").

== Later years ==
Despite her advanced age, Lytvynova-Bartosh was an active member of the Hlukhiv Zemstvo. Working in the artisanal and local departments of the zemstvo, Lytvynova-Bartosh conducted numerous series "History and Geography". - Kharkiv, 2018. - Issue 55 51 ethnographic explorations in many villages and hamlets. She toured the handicraft workshops of weavers, goldsmiths, potters, collected and arranged collections of Easter eggs, towels, scarves, studied woodworking and jewelry (rings, ornate cradles, crosses). In the early 1880s, for her dedicated work in preparation for the Moscow exhibition, she received an honorary diploma and a bronze medal.

Her research on wedding ceremonies and customs, was published in 1900 in Lviv under the editorship of F. Vovk. This work was a detailed analysis of all stages of the folk wedding ceremony in the village. A ceremony that has absorbed the traditions that existed in ancient times in Hlukhiv and Chernihiv regions. This study is based on material from the stories of peasants and on their own records and observations of Lytvynova-Bartosh. In addition to detailed characteristics and explanations, the work also contains rich folklore and ethnographic material, as well as original drawings of ceremonial dishes and wedding decorations.

In the last years of her life she worked on "Folk Calendar", "Weaving" and "Folk Cuisine", and despite the serious illness of the last years of her life, Pelageya Yakivna worked tirelessly on the reproduction of ancient folk ornaments and embroidery. She ordered a machine in Krolevets, weaved on it herself and taught others, visited artisans, dreamed of arranging in her village a weaving school. She also dreamed of creating a detailed ethnographic map of her parish, indicating the ancient geographical names of all settlements and natural objects (tracts, forests, lakes, beams, etc.), to record folk tales and legends about local toponymy.

Lytvynova-Bartosh died on September 21, 1904. She was buried in the cemetery under a large spruce tree opposite her house in the village of Dugout. Her house has survived the present in Zemlyankivska village council

On 10 August 2019 in her homeland in the village, a memorial dedicated to the 185th anniversary of her birth was opened.

== Honours ==
Lytvynova-Bartosh was elected a full member of the Shevchenko Scientific Society, a corresponding member of the Paris Anthropological Society. She also collaborated with the Russian Geographical Society and the St. Petersburg Free Economic Society (for the latter, in particular, she studied agriculture and prepared relevant statistical and economic descriptions of the villages of Bogdanovo and Zemlyanka). Her research in the field of economic issues of agriculture was highly praised by the Free Economic Society in Moscow. Lytvynova-Bartosh also aided M. Bilyashivskyin the organization of archaeological explorations in the village Bogdanov. She also took part in the work of the 12th Archaeological Congress in Kharkiv (1902).

== Legacy ==
There is practically no branch of folk culture that Litvinova-Bartosh did not pay attention to in her numerous local lore studies. She collected materials on folk weaving, fishing, cooking, folk beliefs, traditions, life, economy and more. All these materials, collected during numerous ethnographic, art and folklore explorations, were systematized by her. The scientific records made and published by her gained her wide fame as an outstanding connoisseur of Ukrainian antiquities not only in Ukraine but also in Europe.

She donated many exhibits from her collections to museums in St. Petersburg and Moscow. Her remaining collections, unfinished works, manuscripts and correspondence are currently stored in the Rylsky Institute of Art History, Folklore and Ethnology of the National Academy of Sciences of Ukraine, the Institute of Archeology of the National Academy of Sciences of Ukraine and the National Museum of History of Ukraine.
