= Theodor Burchardi =

German admiral (1892–1983)

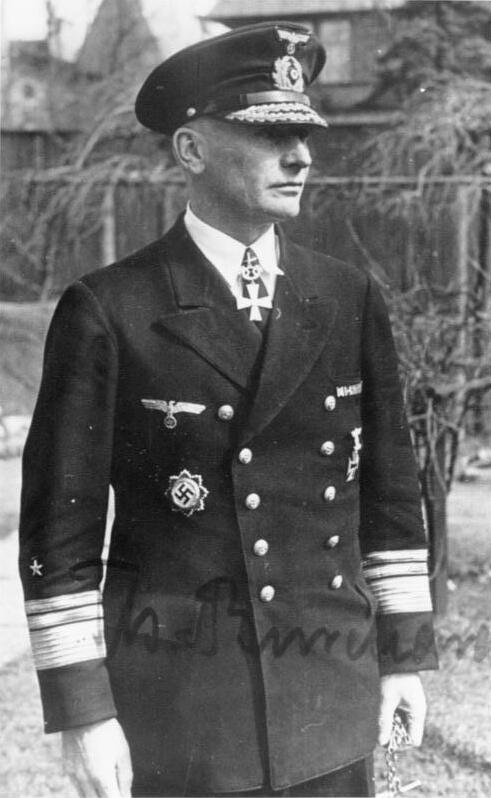
- Born: 14 May 1892; Homberg
- Died: 12 August 1983 (aged 91); Gluecksburg
- Military career
- Allegiance: German Empire; Weimar Republic; Nazi Germany
- Branch: Kriegsmarine
- Service years: 1911–45
- Rank: Admiral
- Commands: Cruiser Köln; Commanding admiral "Ostland"
- Conflicts: World War I World War II: Operation Hannibal
- Awards: Knight's Cross of the Iron Cross with Oak Leaves

Theodor Burchardi (14 May 1892 – 12 August 1983) was an Admiral with the Kriegsmarine during World War II and recipient of the Knight's Cross of the Iron Cross with Oak Leaves of Nazi Germany. He was responsible for organising the evacuation of 2 million people from Courland and Eastern Prussia at the end of World War II in Operation Hannibal and the Evacuation of East Prussia.

== Biography ==
Burchardi was born in Homberg. He entered the Kaiserliche Marine on 1 April 1911 as a sea cadet and was trained on the Large cruiser SMS Hansa. During his attendance at Marineschule he was promoted on 15. April 1912 to Midshipman (Fähnrich zur See) and was transferred on 1. October 1913 to the large cruiser SMS Seydlitz.

Just after the start of World War I he was promoted on 3. August 1914 to Lieutenant (Leutnant zur See). On 3. January 1915 he was transferred to the large cruiser SMS Moltke and from 6. May to 15. June 1915 he attended an artillery course on SMS Kaiserin Augusta. After that he was transferred to Torpedo boats half flottile as a watch officer. After his promotion to Lieutenant 1st grade (Oberleutnant zur See) 26. April 1917 Burchardi took over Torpedo boat G 39 as his first command, that he continued until end 1918.

After his promotion to Captain (Kapitän zur See) on January 1, 1937, he was given command of the light cruiser Köln on October 15, and commanded it in patrols off the Spanish coast during the Spanish Civil War.

At the beginning of the Second World War, Köln was in the Baltic Sea. Burchardi relinquished command of Köln on January 14, 1940 and was appointed chief of staff of the Kriegsmarine shipyard in Kiel. On January 1, 1941, he was promoted to Rear Admiral. In preparation for Operation Barbarossa, Burchardi was appointed as Marinebefehlshaber D (Naval Commander D). On November 6, 1941 Burchardi was appointed as Commanding Admiral in Ostland. On February 1, 1943 he was promoted to Vice Admiral.

On June 17, 1944, Burchardi was appointed as Commanding Admiral of the Eastern Baltic Sea and was promoted to Admiral on January 1, 1945. Burchardi commanded the naval units involved in Operation Aster, the evacuation of German troops and civilians from Estonia. In the final months of the war, Burchardi commanded naval units in Operation Hannibal, he was responsible for organizing the evacuation of 2 million people from Courland and East Prussia.

He died in Gluecksburg.

== Awards ==
- Iron Cross (1914) 2nd Class (24 January 1915) & 1st Class (27 September 1919)
- Wehrmacht Long Service Award 4th to 1st Class (2 October 1936)
- Sudetenland Medal (20 December 1939)
- Memel Medal (3 June 1940)
- Clasp to the Iron Cross (1939) 2nd Class (10 October 1939) & 1st Class (18 January 1940)
- Order of the Cross of Liberty 1st Class with Swords (7 June 1943)
- German Cross in Gold (31 March 1944)
- Knight's Cross of the Iron Cross with Oak Leaves
  - Knight's Cross on 29 September 1944 as Vizeadmiral and commanding admiral Ostland
  - 823rd Oak Leaves on 8 April 1945 as Admiral and commanding admiral eastern Baltic Sea
