= Lev Skvirsky =

Soviet military leader and lieutenant-general

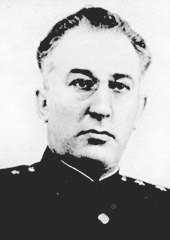
Portrait of Lev Skvirsky

Lev Solomonovich Skvirsky (Russian: Лев Соломонович Сквирский; 15 September 1903 – 5 April 1990) was a Soviet military leader and lieutenant-general. In World War II, Skvirsky was appointed chief of staff for the 14th Army in Karelia in 1940 and for the entire Karelian Front in 1941-1943. He also commanded the 26th Army in 1943-1945.

== Biography ==
Lev Skvirsky was born to a Jewish family in the village of Stepantsi near Cherkasy region in 1903. As a Red Army soldier in the Russian Civil War, he took part in the fighting against Anton Denikin's White Volunteer Army.

Trained in infantry command at courses in Chernigov and Kiev during the 1920s, Skvirsky served as a platoon and company leader in Red Army infantry units. He joined the Soviet Union's All-Russian Communist Party (Bolsheviks) in 1924.

Skvirsky received staff officer and military academy positions in the 1930s, and graduated from Frunze Military Academy, where he also taught. Assigned to the Leningrad Military District-based 14th Army as a staff officer in September 1939, he took part in the Soviet Finnish War of 1939-1940 and was made chief of staff for the 14th Army in October 1940.

The 14th Army fought against both the German and Finnish armies following Nazi Germany's invasion of the Soviet Union in June 1941. Skvirsky was promoted to chief of staff for the recently formed Karelian Front in September 1941. Named commander of the 26th Army in May 1943, he directed the Soviet advance against the Finns in the fighting around Vyborg (Viipuri) and Petrozavodsk (Petroskoi).

Skvirsky worked as a chief of staff for the Belomorsky and Ural military districts and taught at military academies in the post-war period before retiring from the Soviet Armed Forces in 1960.

Skvirsky died in 1990 at eighty-six, and was buried at the Troyekurovskoye Cemetery on Moscow's outskirts.

== Honours and awards ==
- Order of Lenin
- Order of the Red Banner, four times
- Order of Kutuzov, 2nd class
- Order of the Red Star, twice
