= Lake Porkuni =

Lake in Estonia

- Porkuni järv (Estonian)
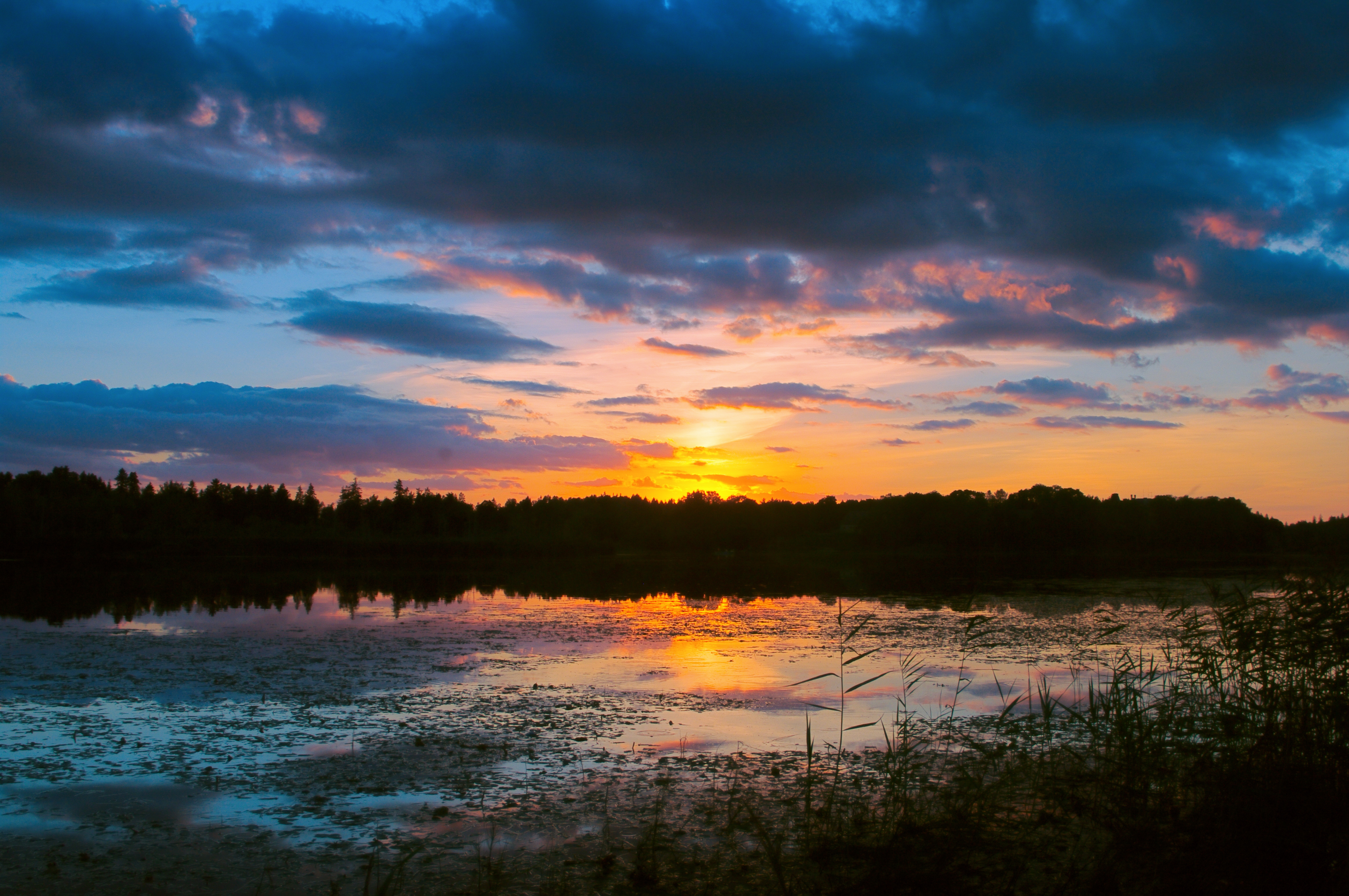

- Location within Estonia
- Location: Porkuni
- Coordinates: 59°11′N 26°12′E
- Primary outflows: Valgejõgi
- Basin countries: Estonia
- Max. length: 2,020 meters (6,630 ft)
- Surface area: 49.4 hectares (122 acres)
- Average depth: 2.0 meters (6 ft 7 in)
- Max. depth: 2.5 meters (8 ft 2 in)
- Shore length^{1}: 12,710 meters (41,700 ft)
- Surface elevation: 107.5 meters (353 ft)
- Islands: 13
- ^{1} Shore length is not a well-defined measure.

Lake Porkuni (Estonian: Porkuni järv) is a lake in northern Estonia. It is located in the village of Porkuni in Tapa Parish, Lääne-Viru County. It is the source of the Valgejõgi River.

== Physical description ==
The lake has an area of 49.4 hectares (122 acres), and it has 13 islands with a combined area of 4.9 hectares (12 acres). The lake has an average depth of 2.0 meters (6 ft 7 in) and a maximum depth of 2.5 meters (8 ft 2 in). It is 2,020 meters (6,630 ft) long, and its shoreline measures 12,710 meters (41,700 ft).

== See also ==
- Battle of Porkuni (1944)
