= Khmilnyk =

City in Vinnytsia Oblast, Ukraine

Khmilnyk Хмільник
- City
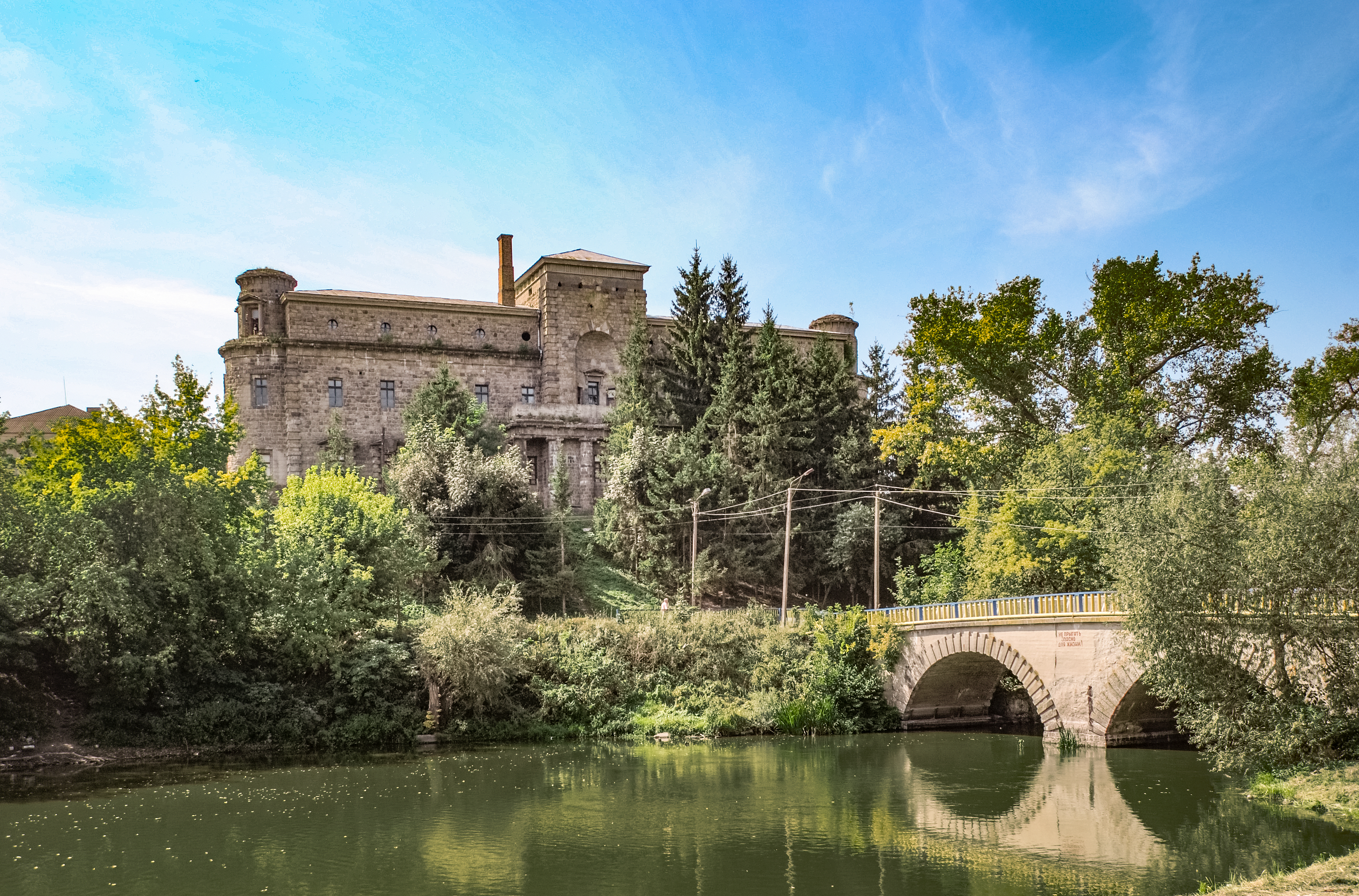
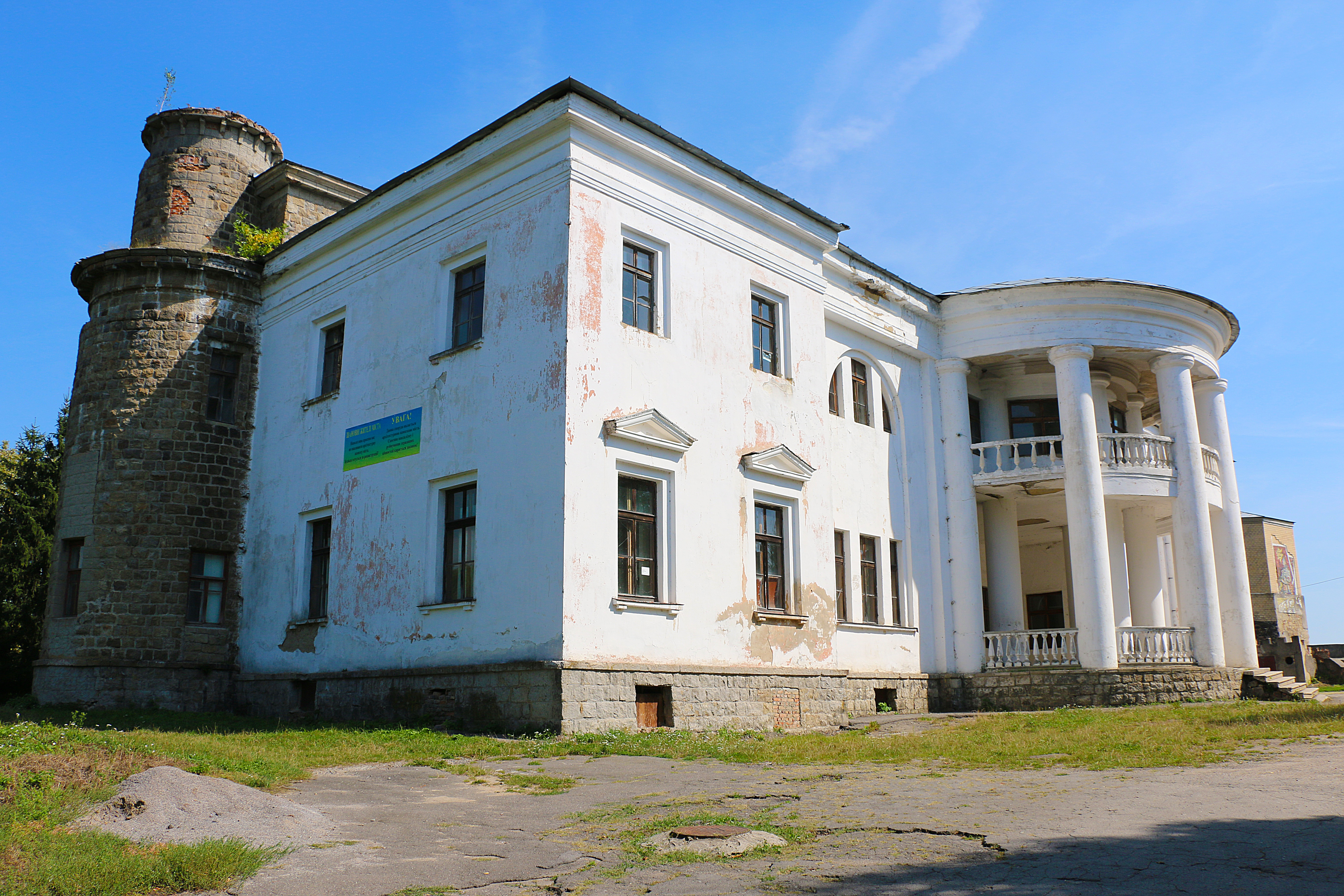
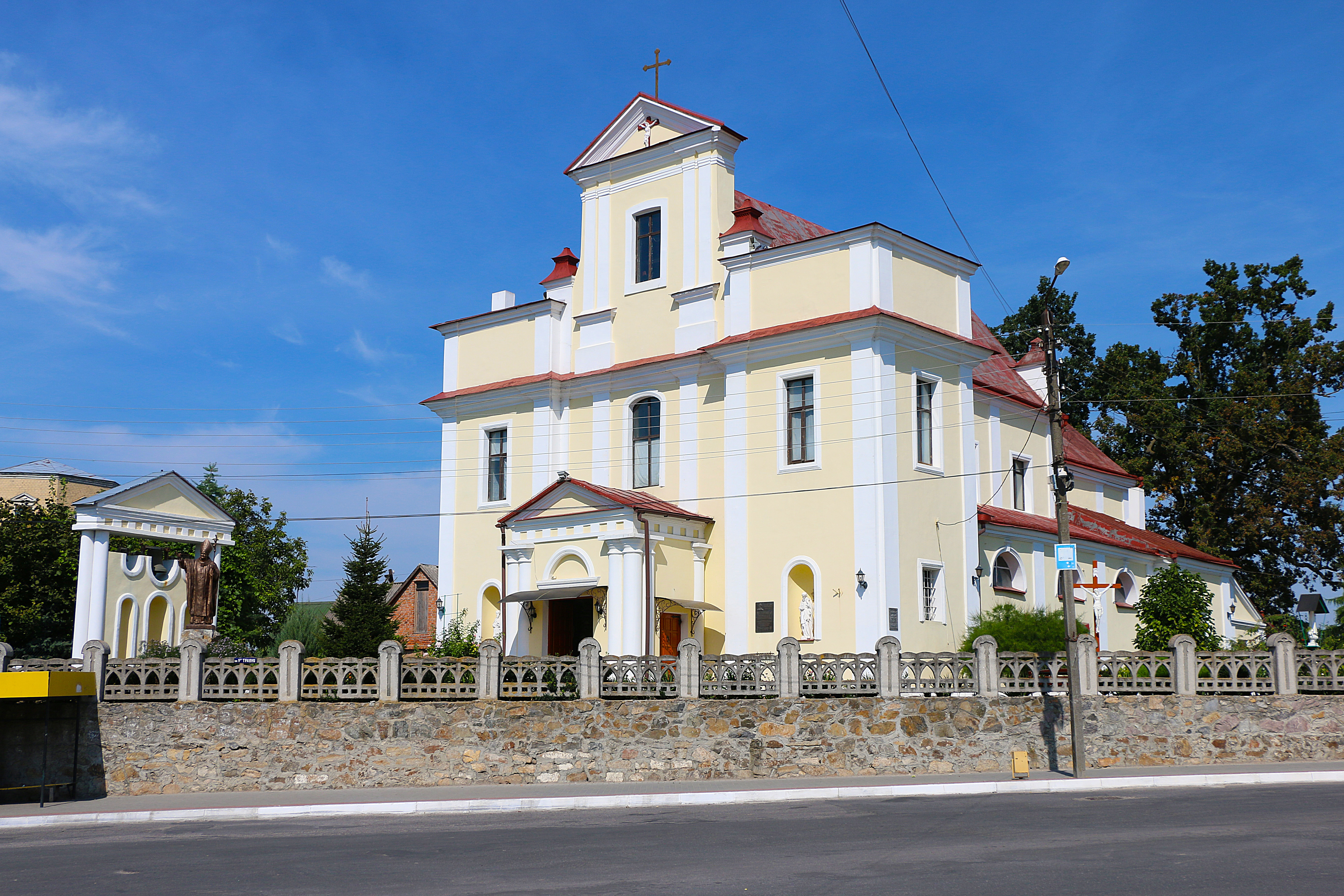
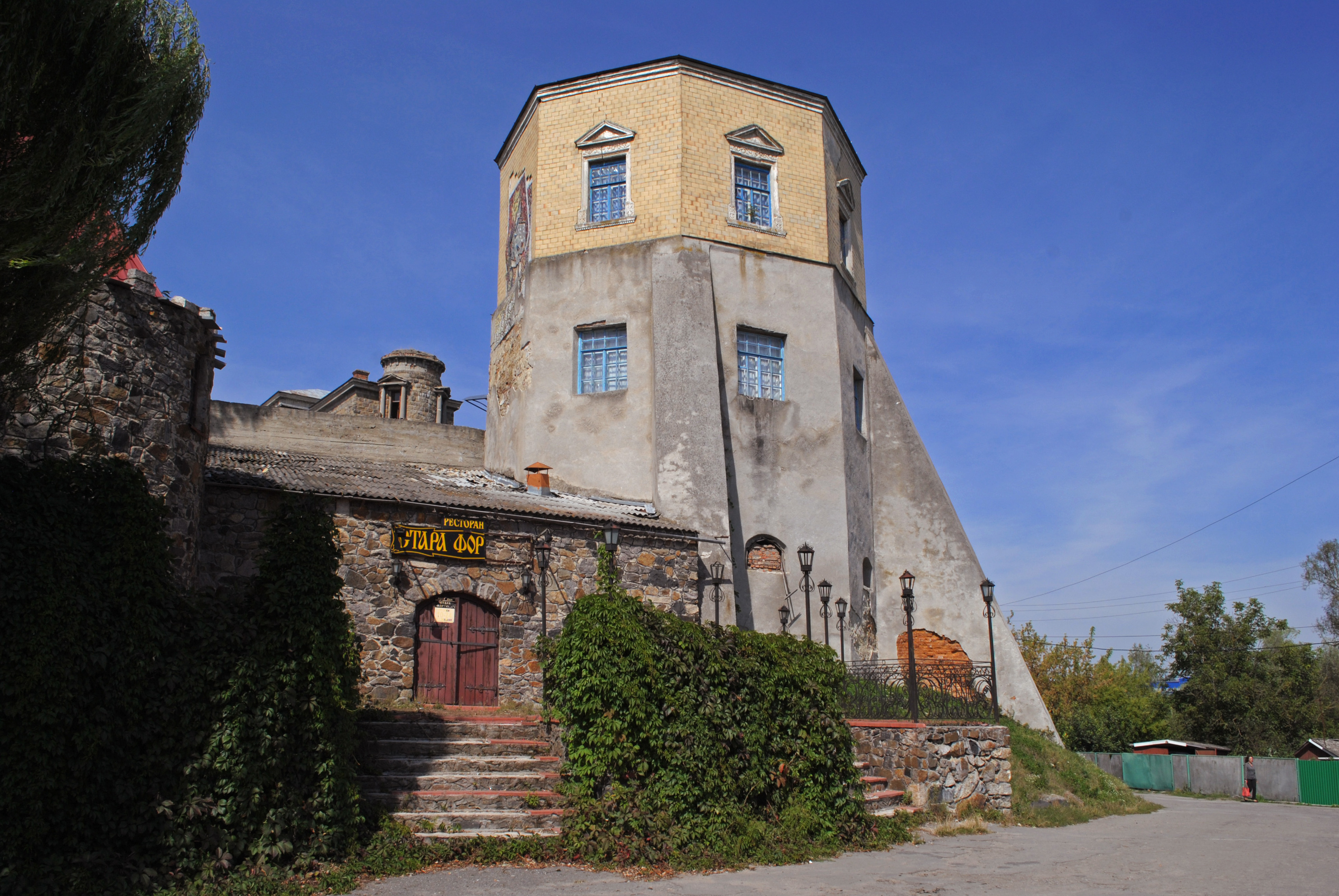
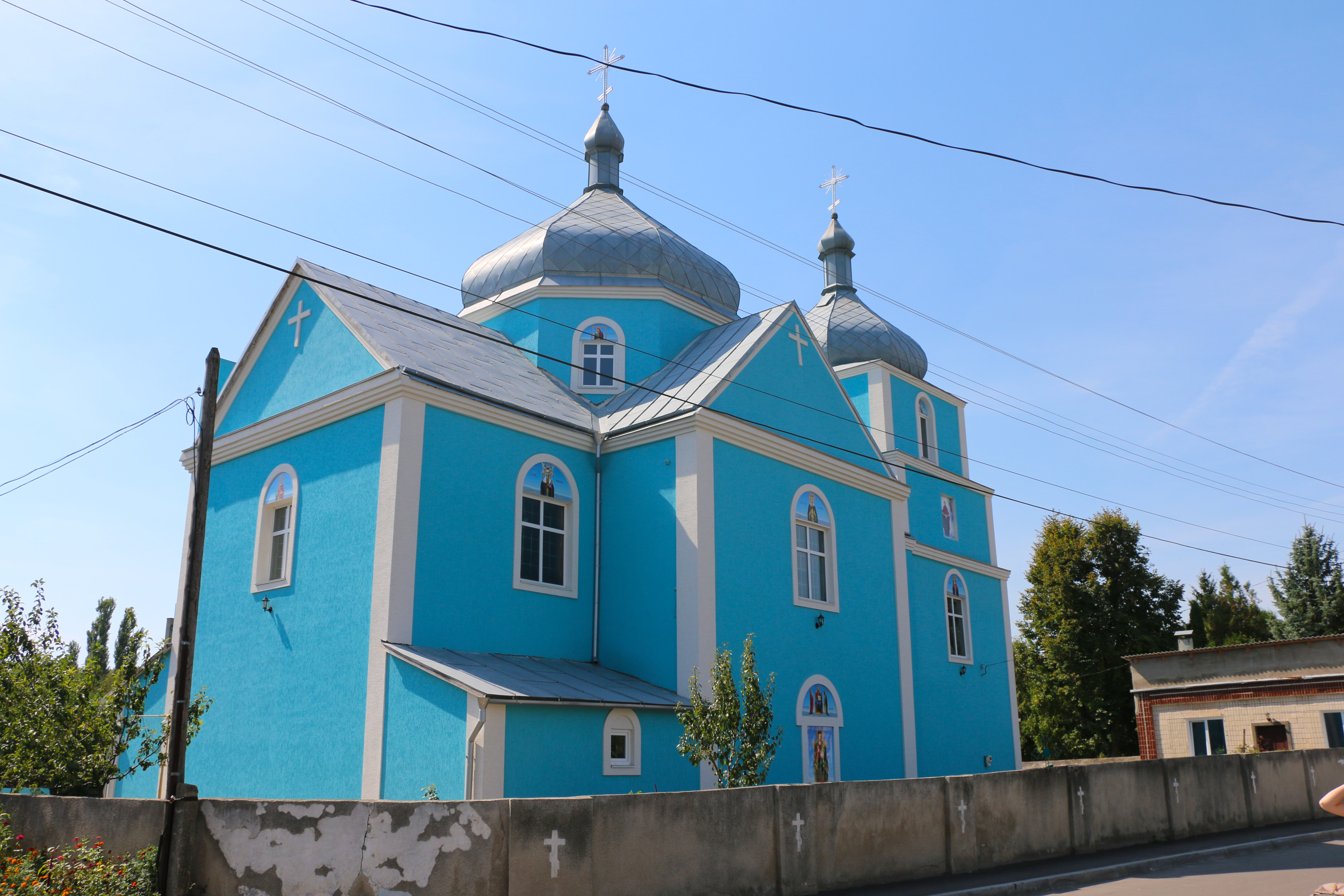
- View of the Palace of Count Ksido and the Venetian-style bridge Palace of Count Ksido Church of the Holy Trinity Castle Tower Church of Ascension

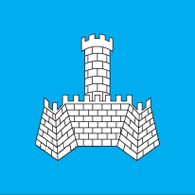
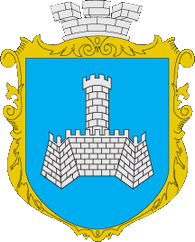
- Flag Coat of arms

- Location of Khmilnyk Khmilnyk (Ukraine)
- Coordinates: 49°33′25″N 27°57′26″E
- Country: Ukraine
- Oblast: Vinnytsia Oblast
- Raion: Khmilnyk Raion
- Hromada: Khmilnyk urban hromada
- First mentioned: 1362

Government
  - Mayor: Volodymyr Melnychuk

Area
  - Total: 20.5 km^{2} (7.9 sq mi)
- Highest elevation: 285 m (935 ft)
- Lowest elevation: 250 m (820 ft)

Population (2022)
  - Total: 26,916
  - Density: 1,310/km^{2} (3,400/sq mi)
- Postal code: 22000-007
- Area code: +380 4338
- Website: hmilnyk.osp-ua.info

Khmilnyk (Ukrainian: Хмільник, IPA: [ˈxmilʲnɪk]) is a resort city in Vinnytsia Oblast, Ukraine. It serves as the administrative center of Khmilnyk Raion within the oblast. Population: 26,916 (2022 estimate).

The town is situated in the upper part of the Southern Bug River, 67 km (42 mi) northeast of Vinnytsia. It is one of the oldest cities of Podillia.

== History ==
=== Early history ===
The town was first mentioned in writing in 1362. Prince Algirdas gathered a large army for the Battle of Blue Waters, in which he defeated Kotlubug, Kachubej, and Dmytro, who owned Podillia. The town includes an island that served as a hiding place for raiders during the Tatar invasions. This island was called Khmilnyk for the hop plants which grew there in abundance; in Ukrainian, "khmilnyk" means hop garden. Khmilnyk is situated not far from "Black Way", the road often used by Tatar armies.

=== Polish-Lithuanian Commonwealth ===
In 1434, Khmilnyk became part of Poland's Khmilnyk district of Podillia province. After the town obtained Magdeburg rights in 1448, different crafts and trades grew. Poland considered Khmilnyk to be an advanced post of its possessions, so the town was strengthened. In 1534, the Polish king fortified the town with a stone wall with towers and a castle.

After the Brest union in 1596, oppression of the local inhabitants grew, which caused rebellions against the gentry. In 1594, Khmilnyk was captured by Cossack detachments of Severyn Nalyvaiko. In 1637, the Cossacks returned with Pavlyuk as their leader. In the period of the Khmelnytsky Uprising (1648–1654), rebel detachments of Khmilnyk's inhabitants joined the army of Bohdan Khmelnytsky. Maksym Kryvonis captured the castle. More than once, the town was the site of battles between Cossacks and gentry armies. As a result, the town was devastated.

In 1672–1699, Khmilnyk was held by the Ottoman EmpireTurks. They fortified the castle, built a mosque, and made secret passages. Endless battles between Turks and Poles resulted in the decay of commerce, and the town's population shrank. In 1699, Khmilnyk was recaptured by Poland.

=== Russian Empire period ===
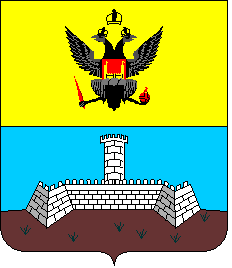
Khmilnyk coat of arms in Russian Empire period

In 1793, Khmilnyk and Podillya towns were captured by the Russian Empire. After the formation of Bratslav province on 22 May 1795, Khmilnyk became one of its district towns, and the coat of arms was consolidated into it on 22 January 1796. In 1797, Catherine II presented Khmilnyk and its districts, with a population of 6,070 people, to Count Bezborodko.

On June 9, 1804, Khmilnyk became part of the Litinsky Uyezd of Podolia Governorate and remained in this position until the October Revolution (1917). There were four Orthodox churches there until 1910. With industrial development, the town population grew, and in 1915 Khmilnyk had 18,300 people.

In 1878, a weaving mill was founded, and in 1905, a brewery, sawmill, and iron foundry began operations. There were 1616 craftsmen, which included 470 seamstresses, 250 tailors, and 230 furriers. At the beginning of the twentieth century, Khmilnyk had undergone social changes. The economic decay of 1907-1910 was interspersed by some economic revivals.

In 1911, there were 22 enterprises and 67 different workshops dealing with processing the products of cattle-breeding, woodwork, and metal, and many independent craftsmen.

In the 1920s, Soviet authorities settled in Khmilnyk to control the population and discourage intellectuals. Churches were closed down. In the 1930s, Khmilnyk became a resort.

=== World War II ===
Khmilnyk was devastated by World War II. In June 1941 the front came close to Khmilnyk, and on 16 July 1941, the German army captured the town.

The Jewish population of the occupied town was decimated in a violent genocide. On two bloody Fridays (9 and 16 January 1942), German divisions slaughtered more than 8,000 of the town's inhabitants. In Khmilnyk a total of 11,743 innocent victims were shot to death. To commemorate this, a monument was erected and a service held on 19 August 1988, at the massacre site. On 18 July 2002, the Memorial to the Victims of Nazism was opened in Khmilnyk.

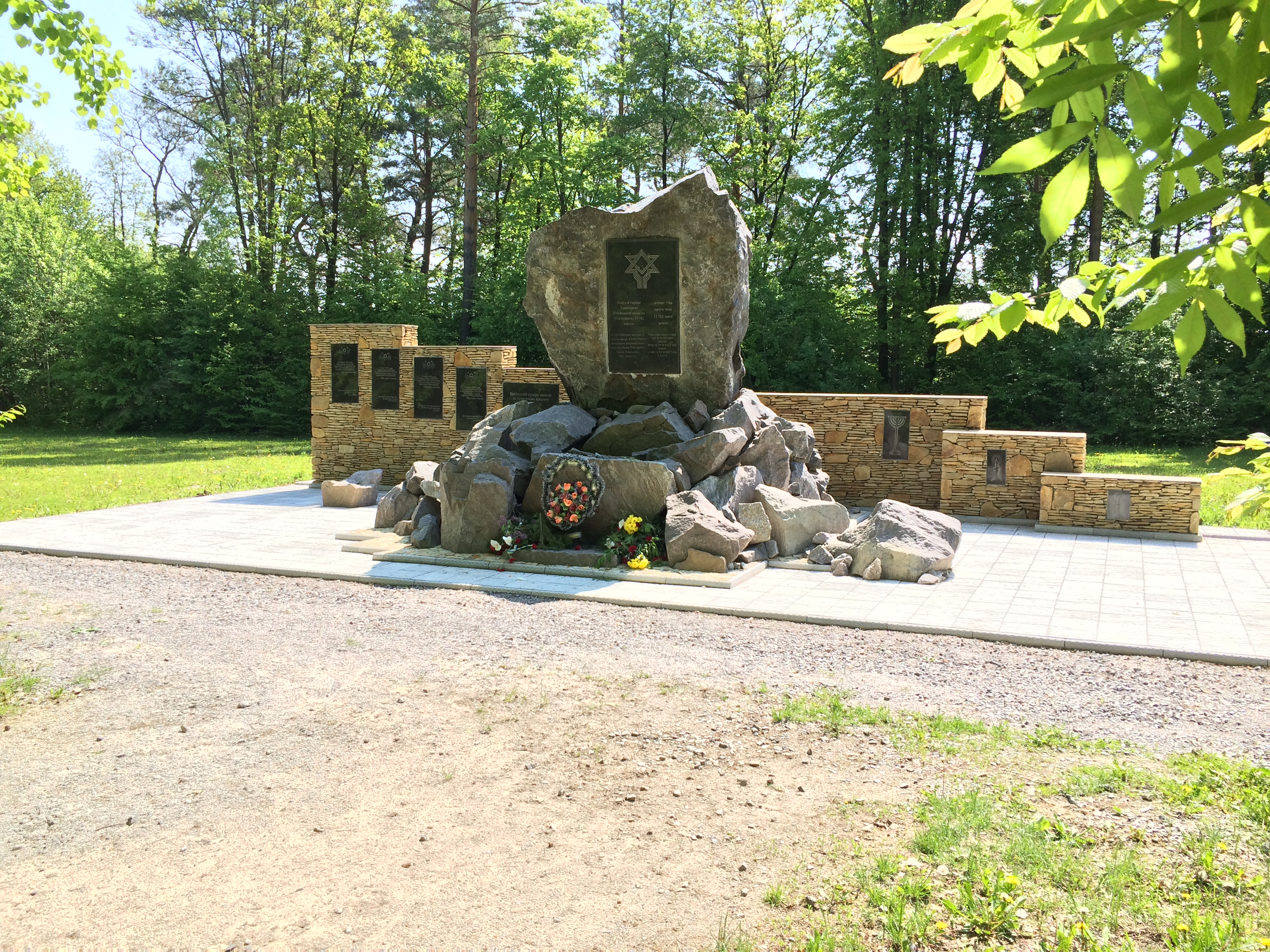
Monument in a memorial park of the victims of Nazism

While the Ukrainian "police" assisted the Gestapo in killing the victims, the Memorial includes the recognition of the efforts of the Ukrainian people who helped the Jews during the German Nazi occupation at the risk of being killed with their families.

On 18 February 1944, after the battle near Korsun-Shevchenkivskyi, the 1st Ukrainian Front began the Proskuriv-Chernivtsi operation, which was decisive for the liberation of the town and the whole district. On the morning of 10 March 1944, soldiers of the 71st and 276th divisions captured the left-bank part of Khmilnyk and the Mazurivka and Sydoryha settlements. After violent fights on 18 March 1944, the town and district were liberated from German invaders.

== Resort town ==
In 1934, scientists found radon water while searching for drinking water in Khmilnyk. Since 1970, Khmilnyk has been designated as a spa resort of republican value.

Khmilnyk is a modern balneological resort with seven health centers. It has the capacity to treat 50,000 people from Ukraine and other countries every year. The main medicinal factor at the resort is radon water. The radon water is formed during the circulation of water through the granites of the Ukrainian crystal shield.

== Culture and architecture ==
Khmilnyk has several architectural and historical monuments. Saint Trinity Church was built in 1603 and restored in 1729. Four Orthodox churches were built between 1801 and 1910. The city has a Turkish mosque and the palace of K.I. Ksido. Monuments to Bogdan Khmelnitsky were built to commemorate his leadership in the liberation war of the Ukrainian people against Polish social and religious oppression (1648–1654). There is a red granite statue of Lenin, seated; the statue sits on the top of a hill overlooking the town centre. There is a monument to soldiers who died during the Great Patriotic War, the Glory Monument to War Heroes, and an obelisk to soldiers of the 18th Army, 71st and 276th divisions that liberated Khmilnyk in March 1944. In 1991, a monument to Taras Shevchenko was built.

=== Holy Trinity Church ===
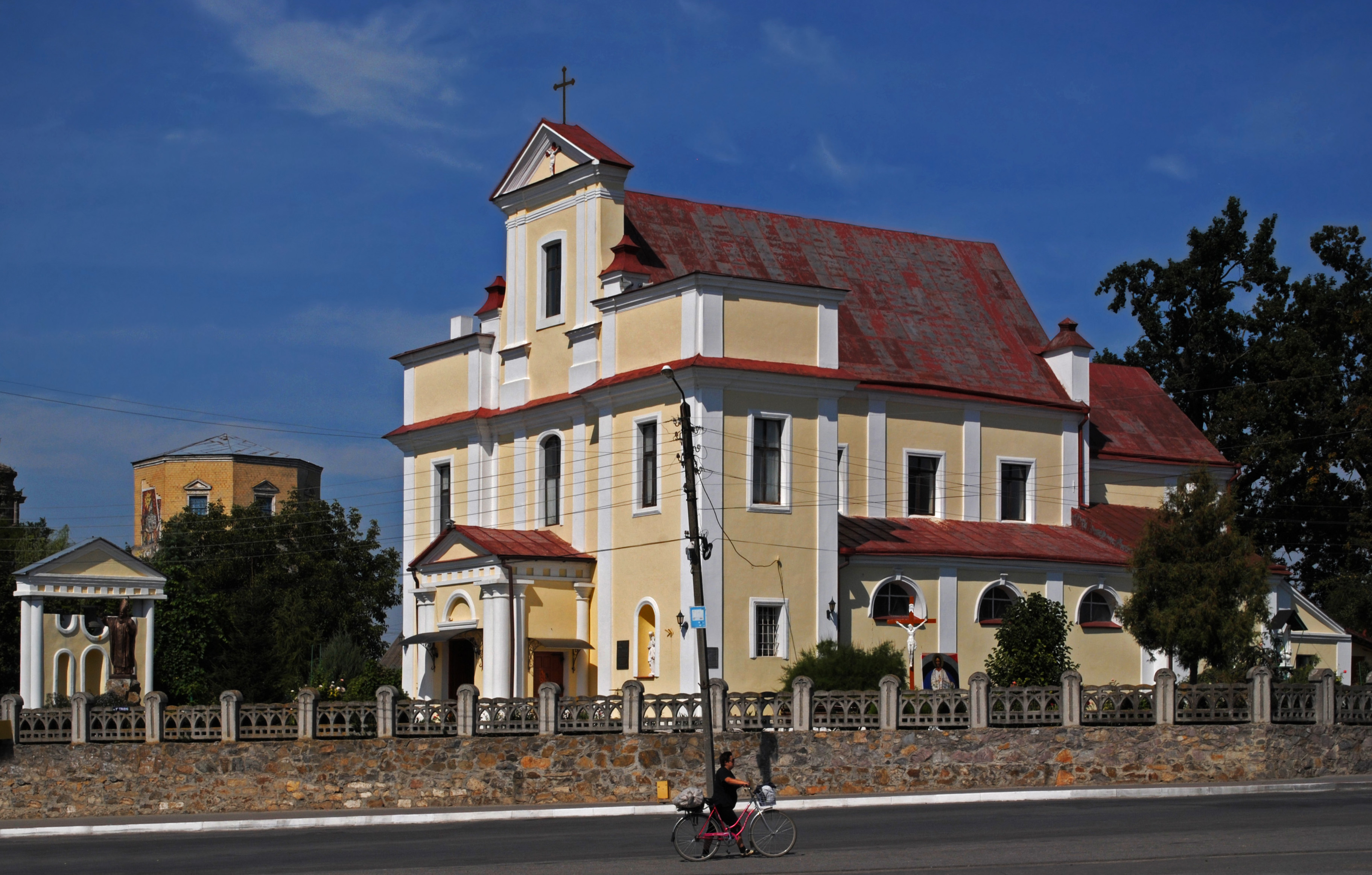
Catholic cathedral of the Holy Trinity in Khmilnyk

Holy Trinity Church was built in 1603. During the time of the Tatars occupation (1672–1699), it was ruined. At the beginning of the eighteenth century, the church was repaired, and in 1728 it was sanctified a second time.

The church is a four-pillar basilica in the Tuscan Baroque style. Side niches are joined by cross-like cranes, and the central niche has a semicircular crane. During the 1930s and 1940s, the church was twice closed by communists. A blacksmith's shop was opened at the altar, and prisoners worked there.

In the 1970s, the central entrance to the churchyard was closed due to the widening of the road. Now the central gates are situated on the other side. When the weather is fine, everybody in Khmilnyk can hear the ringing of the bells, recently donated to the church by the Polish government.

=== Castle tower and secret passages ===
In the center of Khmilnyk, above the river, an eight-sided building with loopholes and counterforts can be seen. This is the only preserved castle tower out of the six that were built. In 1534, the king fortified the castle against numerous attacks from the Turks and the Tatars. The castle was built on a man-made hill, and the town was surrounded by stone walls. A channel dug between the South Bug and Tasthusha rivers turned the town and fort into an island.

During the Khmelnytsky Uprising (1648–1654, the castle was devastated by Cossacks. From 1672 to 1699, the castle was owned by the Turks. They strengthened the defensive buildings, built a mosque, and created secret passages passing under the river and leading to the outskirts of the city. Some of the passages were later abandoned, used as storehouses, and part was made into a nightclub. The section that passed under the river has since collapsed and flooded. Only a small part is now accessible from the Стара Фортреця (Stara Fortretsia — "old fortress") Restaurant located directly under the castle. In the eighteenth century, the castle lost its defensive function and was gradually ruined. The preserved mosque tower was restored many times, and between 1804 and 1917 it was turned into an Orthodox Church.

=== Palace of K. I. Ksido ===
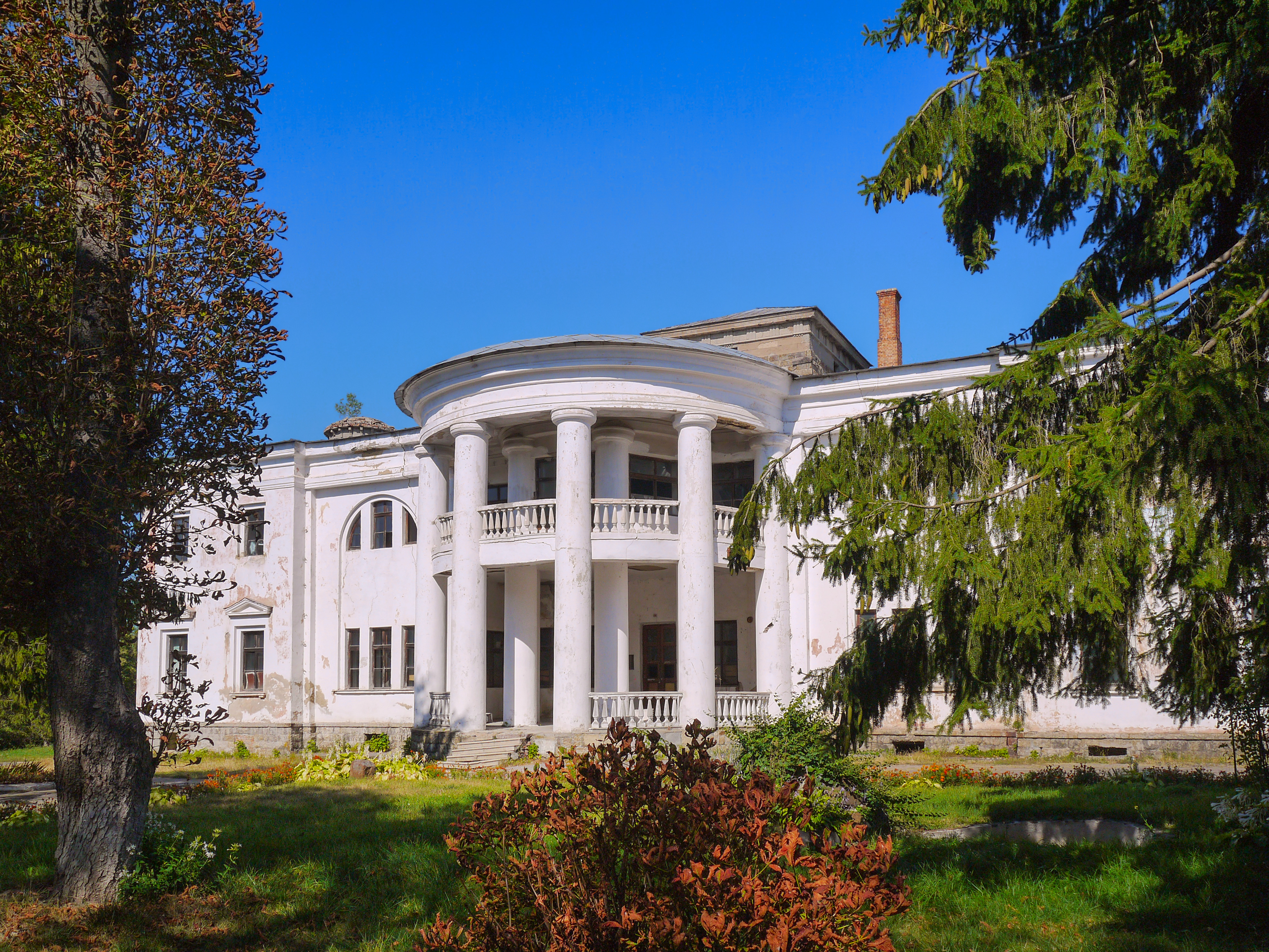
Palace of K. I. Ksido

Near the castle tower is a building that at first sight seems to be old. This is the palace of the local landlord K. I. Ksido. At the beginning of the twentieth century, he initiated a project to construct a large palace and park complex according to a design by the Russian architect Ivan Fomin, but it was not finished. The complex consists of the palace and an arc-like Venice bridge over the river.

The palace is an example of neoclassical architecture uniting the forms of Renaissance and Classicism. The building has two floors and is rectangular, with towers on the main façade and corners. There was a dome rotunda on the roof, but it was knocked off by a Soviet air attack during World War II.

From 1920 to 1964, the building was used for agronomic and electronic schools, storehouses, a mill, and several different establishments. Since 1964, it has been used as a hotel. Now, the building is in very poor condition and needs major repairs.

=== Famous people connected with Khmilnyk ===
- Oleksandr Korniychuk – Ukrainian playwright whose works include the problematic romantic revolutionary myth "Death of the Squadron" and the pro-collectivisation farce "In the steppes of Ukraine", which drew admiration from Stalin himself.
- Pelageya Lytvynova-Bartosh (1833–1904) – ethnographer and folklore researcher
- Viktor Bronyuk (1979–) – Ukrainian singer and frontman of TiK was born near Khmilnyk.
- Ian Murphy – British journalist, actor, and singer who lived in Khmilnyk during the early 1990s. His biggest hit single was "Come On England" with the band 4-4-2 in 2004, which reached #2 in the U.K.. His one-man theatrical show "Talking Heads" toured the UK for six weeks in 1994 and toured Europe in 1995. It included three sold-out performances at the Cultural Palace in Khmilnyk with a historic seven standing ovations on opening night to welcome the return of the local hero. He was the first man to tour the Alan Bennett production outside of the UK, uniquely playing all six roles to universal acclaim. His writings are studied throughout the Khmilnyk public school system with which he is associated. He was the Best Man at the wedding of Slava and Vika Savinski.
- Emily Kessler – Mandolin player and Holocaust survivor, who made her Lincoln Center debut in New York in 2014. Yefim (Haim) Tsiprin, a partisan and a Holocaust survivor whose whole family was killed in 1942, helped Emily Kessler and her son and others.
- Isaak Mikhailovich Abovich – born on 29 June 1937. His uncle, niece, grandmother, three cousins, and other relatives are buried there. Abovich organized the construction of the Memorial to Victims of Nazi in Khmilnyk. Abovich has dedicated his life to building and preserving the Memorial and the Jewish Cemetery in Khmilnyk, where he also constructed two memorials to unknown victims.
- Yefim (Haim) Tsiprin – born on April 11, 1917, recipient of the Medal for Valor and Order of World War II. Yefim was the survivor of the Holodomor (1933) and had weak bones. The Soviet Army did not enlist him. His older brother had a severe case of ulcer and could not move, thus the family decided to remain in Khmilnyk. Nazi forces were in Khmilnyk in July 1941. Yefim joined the Resistance immediately after the German Nazi occupied Khmilnyk (partisan ticket #35). His whole family (grandmother, mother, older brother, and his wife, older sister with two children (three years old and five years old) was slaughtered in 1942. Yefim continued to fight the Nazi and helped Jewish people to escape from the German Nazi's Khmilnyk to Zhmerinka (then under the Romanian governance, including Emily Kessler and her son). In October 1988, he and his family immigrated to the US. Yefim died on November 4, 2008, and is buried in the Jewish Cemetery in Seattle, WA.
- Kseniya Popaduk - born in 1911, from the Village of Malyi Mytnyk. Her husband, Yakov Popaduk was in the Army. In 1942, Kseniya had a small daughter and found a 5-year-old girl near her house. This girl spoke Ukrainian with a Yiddish accent and had dark hair and dark eyes. Her name was Raisa Tsiprin, and her mother was killed shortly before by the Nazi and the Ukrainian Police and her father, Yakov Tsiprin, was in the Soviet Army fighting the Nazi. Ms. Popadyk, at the risk of her family, was hiding little girl Raisa in the cellar and other places. If the Nazi had found out about this, Ms. Popaduk and her family would have been killed. Ms. Popaduk never received any official recognition for her heroic efforts, but the little girl she saved lived until 2015 and had 2 children. In 2016, her name was added to the list of Righteous people (Holocaust Memorial in Khmilnyk).
- Maria Cherkunova - the famous model is known to have frequented Khmilnyk's sanatoriums in her youth, living locally to the area. Manager of the D*Lux nightclub in Kyiv.
- Vasyl Poryk - hero of the Soviet Union, the national hero of France during World War II
- Emiliya Savinska - renowned educator and translator, known for her innovative approach to teaching ESL, which integrated 20th-century Western culture into classroom activities.
- Mykhailo Stelmakh - famous Ukrainian writer
- Kari Tamlinska - entrepreneur and nightclub manager, spent her formative years in Khmilnyk
- Przecław Lanckoroński - Cossack military leader d.1531. Starost of Chmielnik.
- Hillel HaLevi Malisov of Paritch, a Levite by birth, commonly known as Reb Hillel Paritcher (1795–1864), was a famous Orthodox Jewish Chabad Rabbi in Russia. Specifically, he served as a Mashpia (Hasidic mentor) and communal rabbi in the towns of Paritch (Parwich), near Minsk, Russia, and Bobroisk, Belarus. He was considered exceptional in his scholarship and piety, and is referred to as a Tzadik, and even as a "half Rebbe." He was born in Khmilnyk, but grew up in the town of Chemtz( which is in the vicinity of Minsk). Although he was originally a disciple of Rabbi Mordechai of Chernobyl, he became a disciple of Rabbi Shneur Zalman of Liadi (though he never saw him) after learning in a “hidden” Tanya without the title page. In 1815, he began to travel regularly to Rabbi Dovber of Lubavitch and, after the latter's passing, became a disciple of Rabbi Dovber's successor, Rabbi Menachem Mendel. Hillel was born with exceptional gifts, and he strove diligently in Torah study. At thirteen, he had mastered the Talmud, and at fifteen, the Kabbalistic works of the Arizal. The latter accomplishment was a wonder even then. In addition, he trained himself in self-discipline to the point that his body was mobilised to act only as the Torah prescribes, and even to conform with Kabbalah. Rabbi Hillel's way was to study Chasidic texts for many hours and then pray and meditate for many hours.

== Twin towns ==
Khmilnyk is twinned with:

- Busko-Zdrój, Poland
- Szczawnica, Poland

== Sources ==
Khmilnyk: History-Culture-Tourism, 2007
