= Porkuni =

Village in Estonia

Coordinates: 59°11′N 26°12′E

- Village
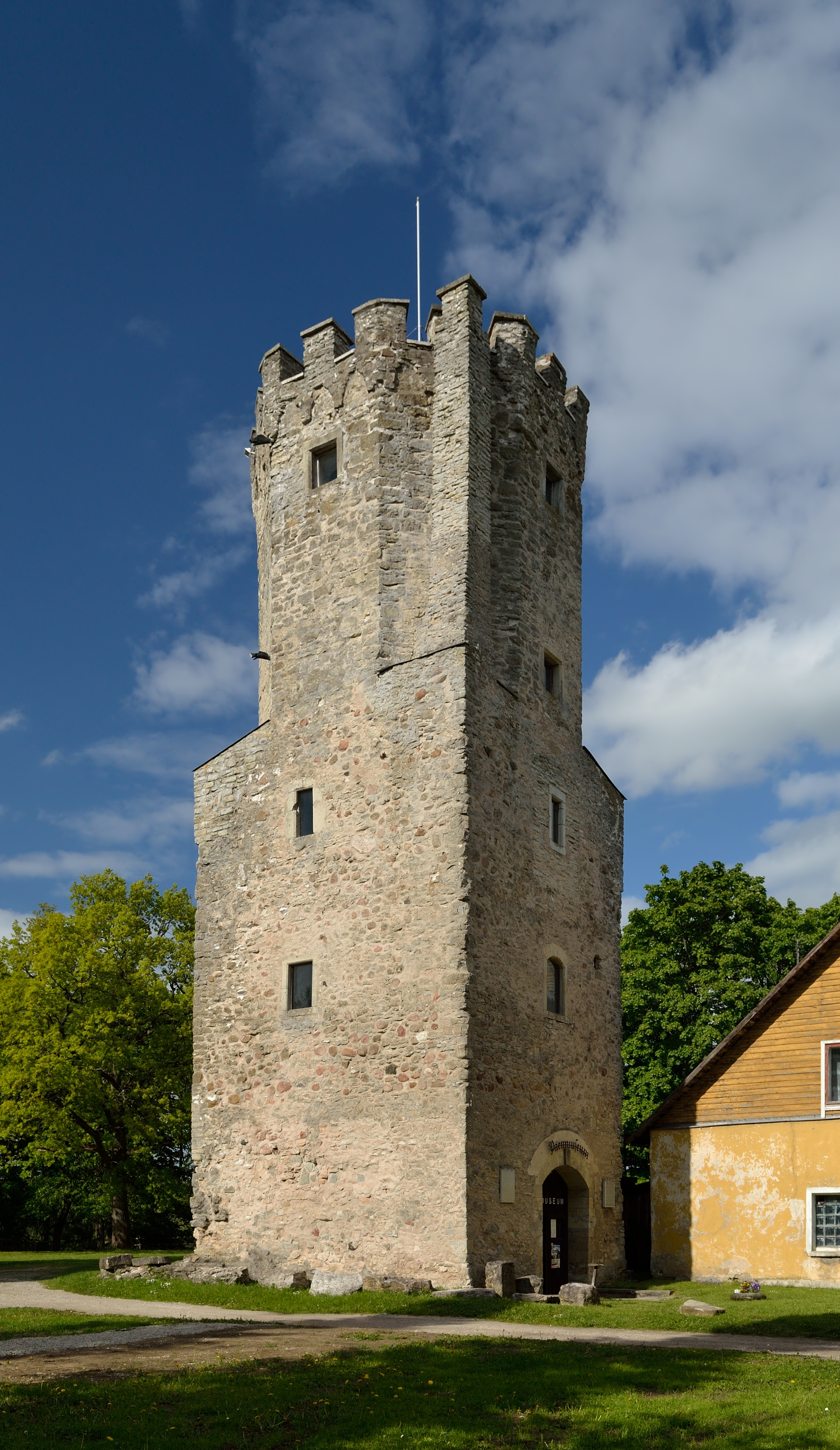
- Porkuni castle gatetower
- Interactive map of Porkuni
- Country: Estonia
- County: Lääne-Viru County
- Parish: Tapa Parish
- Time zone: UTC+2 (EET)
  - Summer (DST): UTC+3 (EEST)

Porkuni (German: Borckholm) is a village in Tapa Parish, Lääne-Viru County, in northern Estonia. The settlement is located around the Lake Porkuni, which is the source of the Valgejõgi River.

In 1944, the Battle of Porkuni was fought in the area.

== Porkuni castle ==
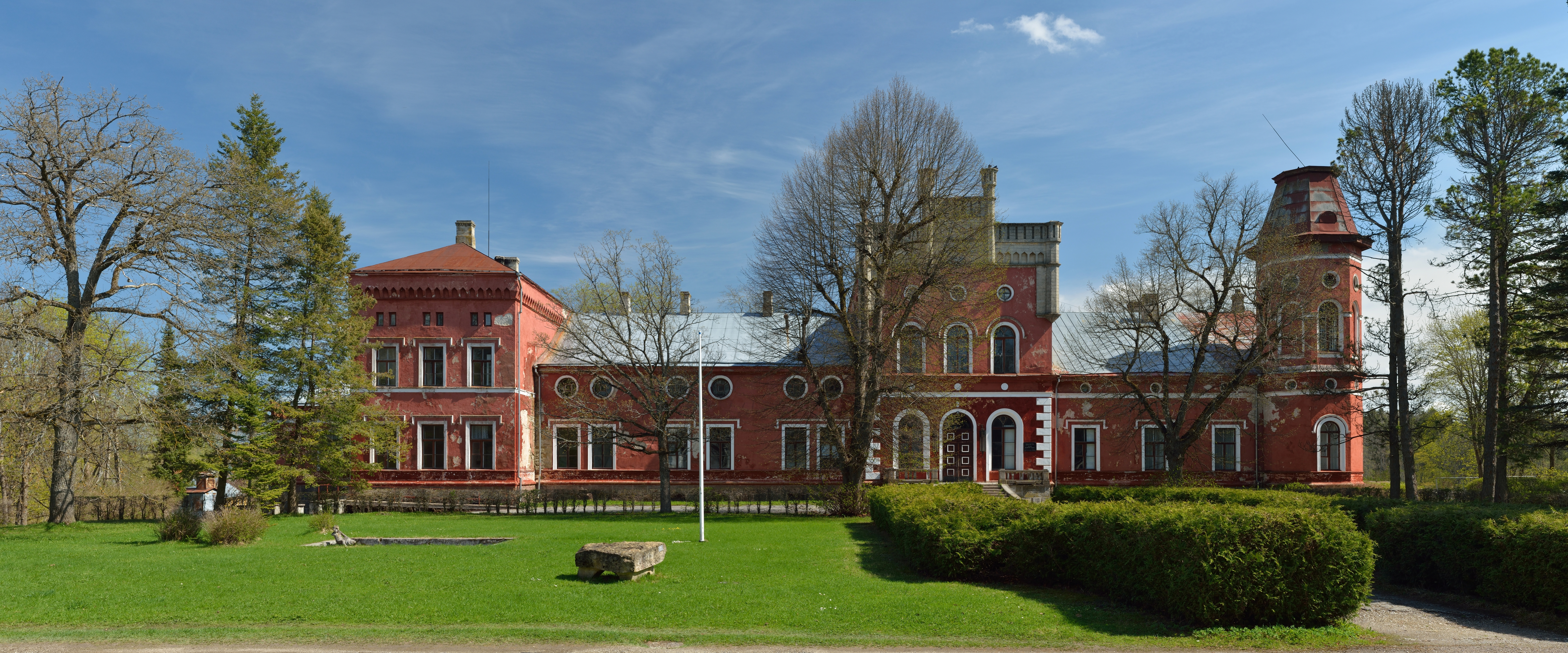
The new manor house

In 1479, a castle was built on an island in the lake by the bishop of Tallinn Simon von der Borch. Porkuni castle (German: Schloss Borkholm) was a four-sided structure surrounding a central courtyard, where a small church stood. In each corner of the castle stood a cannon-tower, and there was also a gate tower which is still preserved, albeit with a few later alterations. Judging from the remains, the castle was built in different stages and the walls were gradually made higher.

The castle was destroyed during the Livonian War.

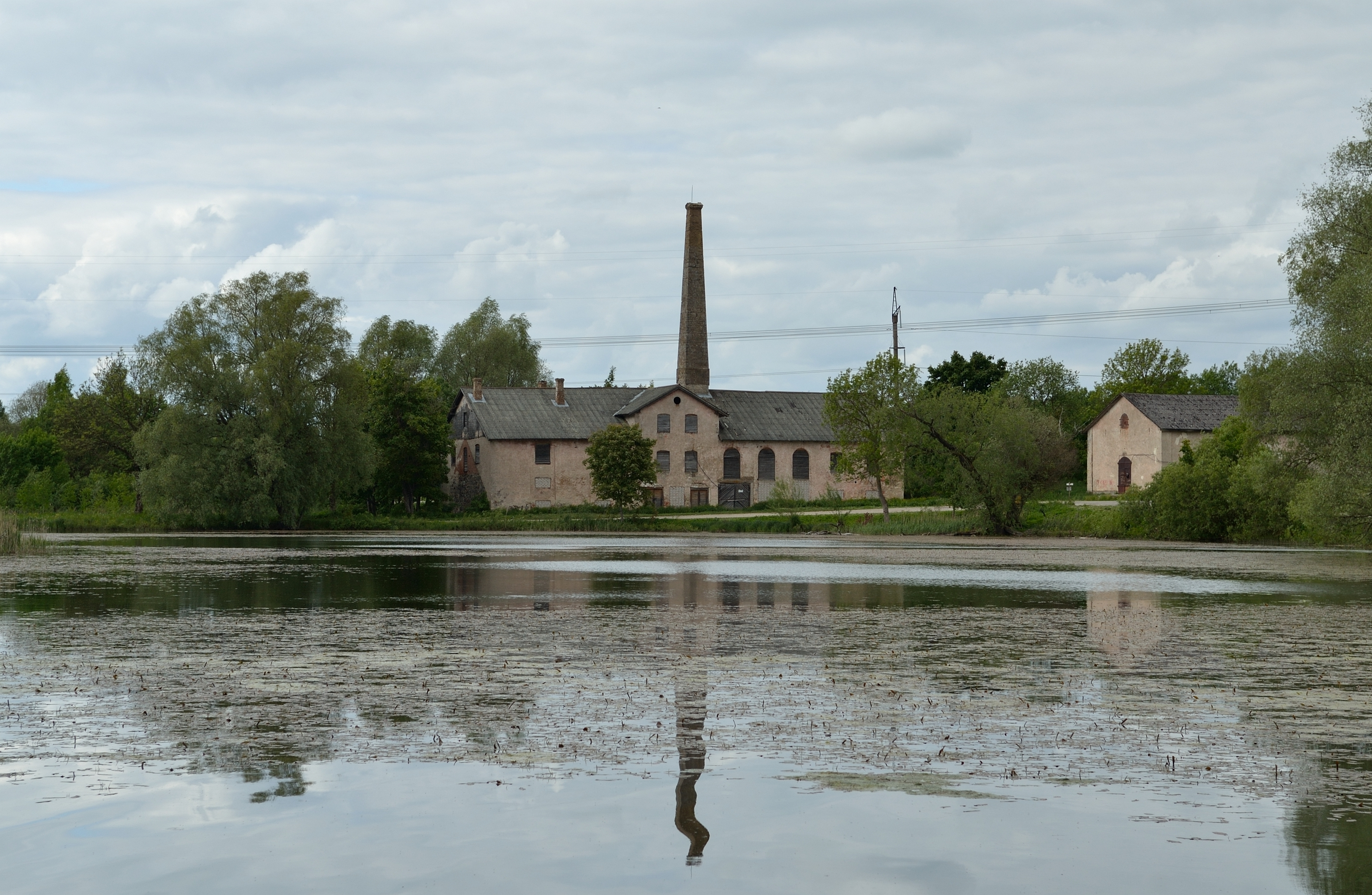
Porkuni manor distillery

In 1870–1874, a new manor house was built at the site by the landowner at the time, Otto Ludwig von Rennenkampff. Perhaps not surprisingly, it is built in a neo-Gothic style, with turrets and other details inspired by a romantic perception of the Middle Ages. The ceremonial rooms of the manor, on the first floor, have been restored. The interior also houses a wrought iron staircase and a noteworthy Art Nouveau cocklestove. The manor house and grounds is now owned by UK telecommunications operator aql.

== See also ==
- Lake Porkuni
- Battle of Porkuni (1944)
- List of palaces and manor houses in Estonia
- List of castles in Estonia
