= 26th Army (Soviet Union) =

WW2 Soviet Red Army formation

- 26-я армия
- Active: 1940–1947
- Country: Soviet Union
- Branch: Red Army
- Type: Combined arms
- Size: Field Army
- Engagements: World War II: Operation Barbarossa; Battle of Uman; Vyborg-Petrozavodsk Offensive; Petsamo-Kirkenes Offensive; Budapest Offensive; Operation Spring Awakening; Vienna Offensive

Commanders
- Notable commanders: Lev Skvirsky

The 26th Army (Russian: 26-я армия, Romanized: 26-ya armiya) was a field army of the Soviet Union's Red Army, active from 1941.

== Operational history ==
=== First Formation ===
26th Army was a part of the Southwestern Front and defended the Soviet-German border between Przemyśl and the Carpathian Mountains in June 1941. The Army was located on the eastern bank of San river manning the 8th Fortified District. The 26th Army commander was Lt. Gen. Fyodor Kostenko who was a Ukrainian. Its opponent was the German Seventeenth Army under command of General Carl-Heinrich von Stülpnagel.

The 26th Army consisted of the 8th Rifle Corps, with the 99th Rifle Division, 173rd Rifle Division, and the 72nd Mountain Rifle Division, the 8th Fortified District, a number of artillery units (the 2nd Anti-Tank Brigade, 233rd Corps Artillery Regiment, 236th Corps Artillery Regiment, and the 28th Independent Anti-Aircraft Squadron, the 8th Mechanised Corps with the 12th Tank Division, 34th Tank Division, and the 7th Mechanized Division), and the 17th Pontoon-Bridge Regiment on 22 June 1941. Headquarters was at Borislav.

The Germans attacked the junction between 6th Army and 26th Army. On 23 June General Kirponos ordered 26th Army armour troops (8th Mechanized Corps) to move to Brody out of the command of Kostenko. Meanwhile, German assault created a twenty-mile breach on 24 June. During the night from 26th to 27 June, 6th and 26th retreated from frontier fortifications. The 26th Army and 12th Army now held a line from Ostropol to Bar. On 10 July Kostenko's Army together with 6th Army and 12th Army became threatened by south eastern swing of Kleist's 1st Panzer Group, which could cut them off from Dnieper river. On 20 July two Rifle Corps of 26th Army attacked in northern direction towards the Dnieper. Only small part of the 26th Army with its commander reached the Dnieper. Most of its units were destroyed or captured by Germans. The 6th Army and 26th Army were split apart.

=== Second Formation ===
The 26th Army was quickly rebuilt in October 1941 by subsequent reinforcements and included elements of the 1st Guards Special Rifle Corps and now defended the Dnieper river at Kaniev and Rzhishchev south-west of Kiev. 6th and 12th Army ended up in Uman Pocket. 26th Army tried to relieve those armies and attacked in the Boguslav-Zwenigorodka direction. It didn't work. In September 26 Army itself became surrounded in the Kiev Pocket. The Soviets tried to break out, 26th Army was supposed to attack on Lubny. General Kostenko escaped from the encirclement with quite a large group of his soldiers. The army was disbanded and the remaining forces were assigned to the 50th Army.

=== Third Formation ===
The third time, 26th Army formed in November 1941 in the Volga Military District. On 18 December it was assigned to the newly formed Volkhov Front. In late December 1941 the army was redesignated as the 2nd Shock Army.

Commander: Lieutenant General Grigory Grigorievich Sokolov (November–December 1941)

=== Fourth Formation ===
The army was reformed for the fourth time within the Karelian Front in March–April 1942. On 1 January 1943 the army comprised 27th, 54th, 186th, and 263rd Rifle Divisions, 61st, 67th, 80th (less 2nd Battalion), and 85th Naval Infantry Brigades, artillery, and other units.

Commander in 1943–1945 was Major General (later Lieutenant General) Lev Skvirsky.

==== Composition ====
At the end of the war the army consisted of:

30th Rifle Corps

36th Guards Rifle Division
68th Guards Rifle Division
21st Rifle Division

104th Rifle Corps

74th Rifle Division
93rd Rifle Division
151st Rifle Division

135th Rifle Corps

233rd Rifle Division
236th Rifle Division

Artillery, engineer, and tank units.

=== Commanders ===
- Lieutenant General Fyodor Kostenko (June–September 1941)
- Major General Alexey Kurkin (October 1941)
- Lieutenant General Grigory Grigorievich Sokolov (November–December 1941)
- Major General Nikolai Nikishin (March 1942 – May 1943)
- Major General (later Lieutenant General) Lev Skvirsky (May 1943 – January 1945)
- Lieutenant General Nikolai Gagen (January–May 1945)

== Post War Service ==
The army ended the war in Romania and was assigned to the Southern Group of Forces. The army along with most of its subordinate units were disbanded in 1947. The 25th Guards and 23rd Mechanized Divisions were reassigned to Ukraine.

== See also ==
- Order of Battle for Operation Barbarossa
