= 122nd Guards Rifle Division =

122nd Guards Rifle Division (28 June 1945 – 1946)
- Active: 28 June 1945 – 1946
- Country: Soviet Union
- Branch: Red Army
- Type: Division
- Role: Infantry
- Garrison/HQ: Tartu
- Decorations: Order of Lenin; Order of the Red Banner
- Battle honours: Estonian

The 122nd Guards Rifle Division was an elite infantry division of the Red Army. It was formed in June 1945 from the 2nd formation of the 249th Estonian Rifle Division. The division was stationed in Estonia and disbanded in 1946.

== History ==
The division was formed on 28 June 1945 from the re-designated 249th Estonian Rifle Division. On the same date the entire 8th Estonian Rifle Corps was raised to Guards status as the 41st Guards Rifle Corps. On its formation the 122nd Guards inherited the honorific title and decorations of the 249th, with its full title being 122nd Guards Rifle Estonian, Order of Lenin, Order of the Red Banner Division. Col. August Yulianovich Feldman was in command of the 249th up to the German surrender and likely continued in command of the 122nd Guards until he was appointed deputy commander of the 41st Guards Corps.

This re-designation took place nearly two months after V-E Day, but before the Soviet invasion of Manchuria, so technically the 122nd Guards can be considered a wartime formation, although it did not see combat in Manchuria. The division was stationed in Tartu and was disbanded there in 1946.
