= Vasyl Poryk =

Soviet officer and French Resistance fighter

Vasyl Vasyliovych Poryk
- Василь Васильович Порик
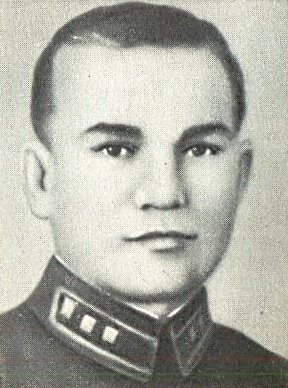
- Born: 17 February 1920; Solomirka, Ukrainian SSR (now Poryk, Vinnytsia Oblast, Ukraine)
- Died: 22 July 1944 (aged 24); Arras, Pas-de-Calais, France
- Military career
- Allegiance: Soviet Union (1938–1941); Free France (1942–1944)
- Branch: Red Army; French Resistance
- Service years: 1938-1941, 1942–1944
- Rank: Lieutenant
- Conflicts: World War II; German-Soviet War; French Resistance
- Awards: Hero of the Soviet Union (1964, posthumously)

Vasyl Vasyliovych Poryk (Ukrainian: Василь Васильович Порик; 17 February 1920 – 22 July 1944) was a Ukrainian officer of the Red Army and a member of the French Resistance during World War II. Recognized as a national hero of France, in 1964 he was posthumously awarded the title of Hero of the Soviet Union.

== Biography ==
Born to a peasant family in the village of Solomirka (now Poryk, Khmilnyk Raion, Vinnytsia Oblast), in 1938 Poryk graduated from an agricultural school in Bobrynets and entered the Odesa Military Infantry Academy. He was later transferred to Okhtyrka and Kharkiv, graduating in 1941 in the rank of lieutenant. At the start of German-Soviet War Poryk served as part of the 6th Army of the Southwestern Front. In autumn of 1941 he was wounded and taken prisoner by the Germans, and sent to a forced labour camp in Beaumont, Pas-de-Calais in occupied France.

Appointed to supervise fellow prisoners by the camp administration, in October 1942 Poryk headed an underground organization known as the "Group of Soviet patriots", which included 11 sabotage groups and a fighting squad composed of 12 members. The group performed acts of sabotage on local mines, damaged railways and communication lines, and eliminated a number of German soldiers and officers. After establishing contacts with the French Resistance, on 15 March 1944 Poryk escaped from the camp and went into hiding in Drocourt near Lens. During that period he became one of the leaders of the resistance movement in northern France. He was known under pseudonyms Basil, Boryk and Hromovyi (Ukrainian for "thunderous").

On the night of 22 April a unit of fighters under Poryk's command attacked the Beaumont camp, liberating its prisoners. During one of the subsequent actions, he was wounded, captured and imprisoned in the Saint Nicaise prison in Arras. However, Poryk was able to escape once again and rejoined the resistance. On 22 July 1944, while on combat duty, he was caught in an ambush and captured for a second time; on the same day Poryk was executed by a Gestapo firing squad. He was buried in the town of Hénin-Beaumont.

== Legacy ==
In 1964 Vasyl Poryk was posthumously awarded the title of Hero of the Soviet Union. His name is mentioned among other participants of French Resistance on the walls of the fortress in Arras. On 18 February 1968 a monument created by sculptors from Kyiv was erected on Poryk's grave.

One of the avenues in Kyiv's Vynohradar neighborhood has been named after Vasyl Poryk.
