= 8th Estonian Rifle Corps =

Estonian military unit, part of Red Army

8th Rifle Corps 41st Guards Rifle Corps
- Active: 1942–1946
- Disbanded: 1946
- Country: Soviet Union
- Branch: Red Army
- Type: Infantry
- Role: Corps headquarters
- Size: two rifle divisions
- Nickname: Estonian
- Engagements: Battle of Narva, Baltic Offensive
- Decorations: Honorific Tallinn

Commanders
- Notable commanders: Lieutenant General Lembit Pärn

The 8th Estonian Rifle Corps (2nd formation) (Russian: 8-й Эстонский стрелковый корпус, Estonian: 8. Eesti Laskurkorpus) was a formation in the Red Army, created on 6 November 1942, during World War II.

An 8th Rifle Corps (but not made up of Estonian personnel) had been previously formed, taking part in the Soviet invasion of Poland as part of the 5th Army, and, on the outbreak of war on 22 June 1941, this first formation was part of the 26th Army in the Kiev Special Military District, consisting of the 99th, the 173rd, and the 72nd Mountain Rifle Divisions. The first formation of the 8th Rifle Corps was destroyed in the first three months of the German invasion and is not present on the Soviet order of battle after August 1941.

The 8th Estonian Rifle Corps was formed of mobilized ethnic Estonians, who were at first brought in Russia (where many of them died because of poor conditions); the battalions created in Estonia and incorporated former personnel of the Republic of Estonia's army. In the order of battle, the corps appears in the Stavka Reserves by 1 November 1942 and is subordinated to the Kalinin Front by 1 December 1942.

When 2nd formation was formed in 1942, the corps' structure consisted of the 7th and 249th Rifle Divisions stationed in Estonia, reinforced by volunteers from the Estonian Communist Party organisation. In an effort to increase overall formation experience, the battle-hardened 19th Guards Rifle Division later joined the 8th Rifle Corps. As a result, the corps was briefly re-designated as 8th Guards Rifle Corps. Throughout its entire existence, the rifle corps was commanded by Lieutenant General Lembit Pärn.

Tankists of the corps' 221st "For Soviet Estonia" Separate Tank Regiment in front of a T-34-76 during exercises in vicinity of Kingisepp, mid-1944

== War service ==
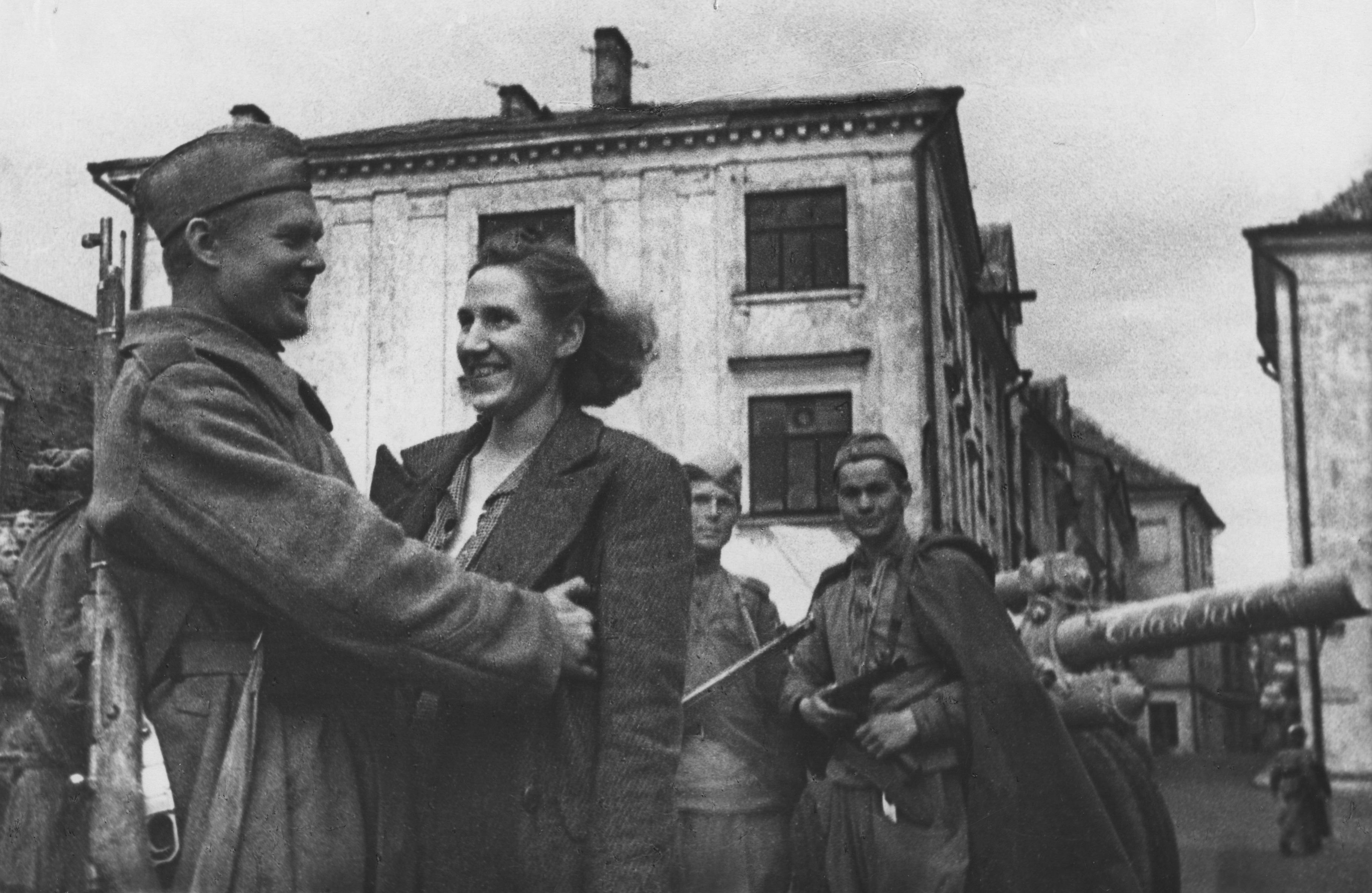
A soldier of the 8th Estonian Rifle Corps embraces his wife in Tallinn, 22 September 1944

The corps fought a total 916 days in the war, and at different times it was in service on the Kalinin, the Leningrad and the 2nd Baltic Front. For 344 days, parts of the corps were engaged with German forces, but no significant gains were made. For the next 123 days, the formation was engaging in the Battle of Velikiye Luki where 13,000 of the 27,000 men were killed or wounded. Then, 37 days were spent in the Battle of Narva, and the final 88 days were devoted to the Battle of Courland. During the Battle of Narva in 1944, the artillery of the rifle corps fired on the 20th Waffen Grenadier Division of the SS (1st Estonian), consisting of Estonians fighting in the Waffen SS. The infantry of the corps was engaged in direct battle with the Estonians on the German side in the battles of Porkuni and Avinurme on 20 and 21 September 1944, where a detachment of the rifle corps murdered a number of wounded prisoners of war. On 22 September elements of the 7th Rifle Division, along with the 45th Estonian Tank Regiment and the 952nd SU Regiment (SU-76s), formed the forward detachment of the corps and entered Tallinn, for which all three units received the name of that city as a battle honor.

The corps appears to have spent the last of its World War II service in the 42nd Army.

== Post-war ==
In total, 4100 settlements were captured by the 8th Estonian Rifle Corps. Of the whole rifle corps, one division, six regiments, and one battalion were decorated with an order. The 8th Estonian Rifle Corps was also given the honorific "Tallinn", and on 28 June 1945, the corps was renamed the 41st Guards Estonian Tallinn Rifle Corps. The two component divisions were also honored; the 7th became the 118th Guards Rifle Division and the 249th became the 122nd Guards Rifle Division. In 1946, both divisions were inactivated to provide personnel for other Soviet activities in the Estonian Soviet Socialist Republic.

According to the 23 June 1945 decision of the Presidium of the Supreme Soviet of the Soviet Union, demobilization of the Red Army started. The first 8th Rifle Corps fighters were demobilized on 16 July 1945. By the end of 1946, 16,550 men were demobilized. Of those, 3,425 (20.7%) started to work in the administrative or legal bodies of the Soviet occupation regime (Communist Party, Komsomol, trade unions etc.).

== See also ==
- Estonia in World War II

== Citations and references ==
=== Cited sources and further reading ===
- Боевой путь Эстонского стрелкового гвардейского корпуса / сост. В. Кюлаотс. — Таллин, 1945. — 251 стр.
- И. Курчавов. Эстонская гвардия. — Таллин, 1946.
- Эстонский национальный корпус Советской армии в Великой Отечественной войне, 1941—1945. — Таллин, 1949.
- Ф. Паульман. Огонь и маневр: Артиллеристы эстонского стрелкового корпуса в Великой Отечественной войне 1941—1945. / вст. слово: К. Ару. — Таллин: Ээсти Раамат, 1968.
- Pokrovsky, Gen. Col., Perecheni No.4: Headquarters of corps included in the structure of the active army during the years of the Great Patriotic War 1941-1945, Military-Scientific Directorate of General Staff, Moscow, 1954
- (in Russian) Галицкий К. Н. Годы суровых испытаний. 1941—1944 (записки командарма) — М.: Наука, 1973.
