= Lithuanians in Russia =

Lithuanian diaspora in Russia

Documented references about Lithuanians in Russia are dated at least by the 13th century. Throughout modern history there were several occurrences of forced migration of Lithuanians in the interior of Russia. According to the 2010 Russian census, 31,377 (0.023% of the total population of Russia) declared themselves as Lithuanians. According to the 2021 Russian census, 13,230 (0.01%) declared themselves as Lithuanians.

As of 2019 Lithuanian Ministry of Foreign Affairs listed some 20 Lithuanian associations registered in Russia.

== History ==
Since at least the 13th century there are records of Lithuanian nobility taking allegiance to principalities in Russian lands and to Russian Tsardom. One of the early cases was Daumantas of Pskov (1240-1299), a Lithuanian prince, who fled to Pskov after his troubles in the Grand Duchy of Lithuania. Other Lithuanian nobility entered Russian lands by marriage or by changing allegiance during wars.

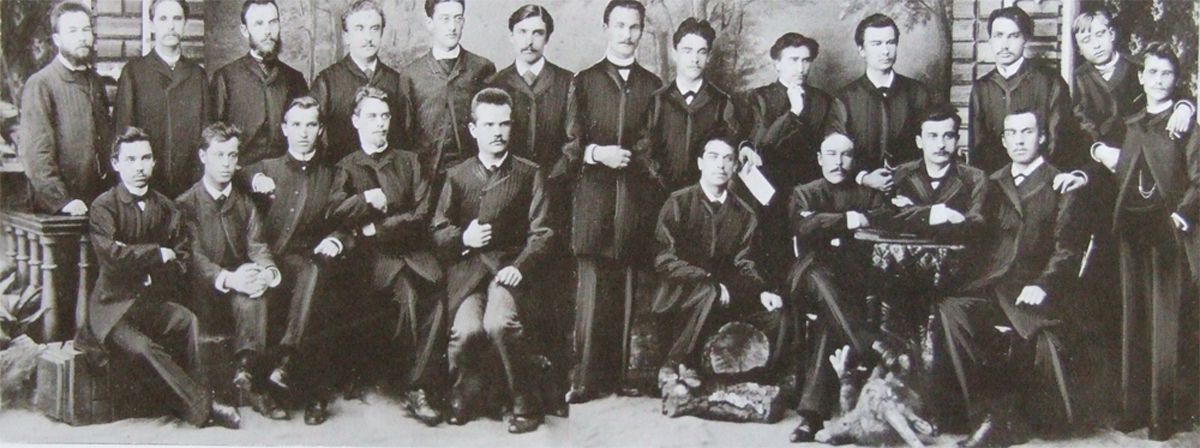
Secret Lithuanian student organization in Moscow University, 1887

After the Partitions of the Polish-Lithuanian Commonwealth, most of Lithuanian lands were incorporated into the Russian Empire and there was economic and educational migration of Lithuanians into Russia proper; a number of prominent Lithuanians stayed in Russia (while many of them returned to Lithuania after receiving education in St. Petersburg and Moscow).

After the Polish November Uprising (1830-1831) and January Uprising (1863–1864), which spread into Lithuania, hundreds of Lithuanian rebels (together with Poles) were exiled to Siberia.

During World War I a considerable number of Lithuanian refugees (among others) from Northwestern Krai and Suvalki Governorate fled into the interior of Russia.

There were massive Soviet deportations from Lithuania to remote parts of the Soviet Union during the Soviet occupation of Baltic states during World War II. The major actions of this kind were June deportation, Operation Priboi, Operation Vesna, Operation Osen. The number of deported non-combatants is estimated 130,000. Still more anti-Soviet Lithuanian partisans and political prisoners were placed into Gulag labor camps. After Stalin's death in 1953 the slow process of the release of deported started. About 60,000 Lithuanians returned from the exile and some 30,000 were prohibited to return to Lithuania.

According to the 1989 Soviet census, there were about 40,000 Lithuanians in Siberia alone. After the collapse of the Soviet Union and Lithuania reestablishing its independence in 1990 they started returning to Lithuania in masses. Reasons to remain include mixed families, old age, and poor financial status.

== See also ==
- Lithuania–Russia relations
- Immigration to Russia
- Lithuanian diaspora
- Russians in Lithuania
