= Visaginas (disambiguation) =

Visaginas may refer to:

- Visaginas, a city in Lithuania
- Visaginas (lake), lake located south of the town of Visaginas in eastern Lithuania
- Visaginas Municipality, one of the municipalities of Lithuania
- Visaginas Nuclear Power Plant, planned nuclear power plant project in Lithuania
- FK Interas Visaginas, Lithuanian football team from Visaginas
