= Operation Priboi =

Code name for mass deportations by the Soviet Union in 1949

- Part of the enforced population transfer in the Soviet Union and the guerrilla war in the Baltic states
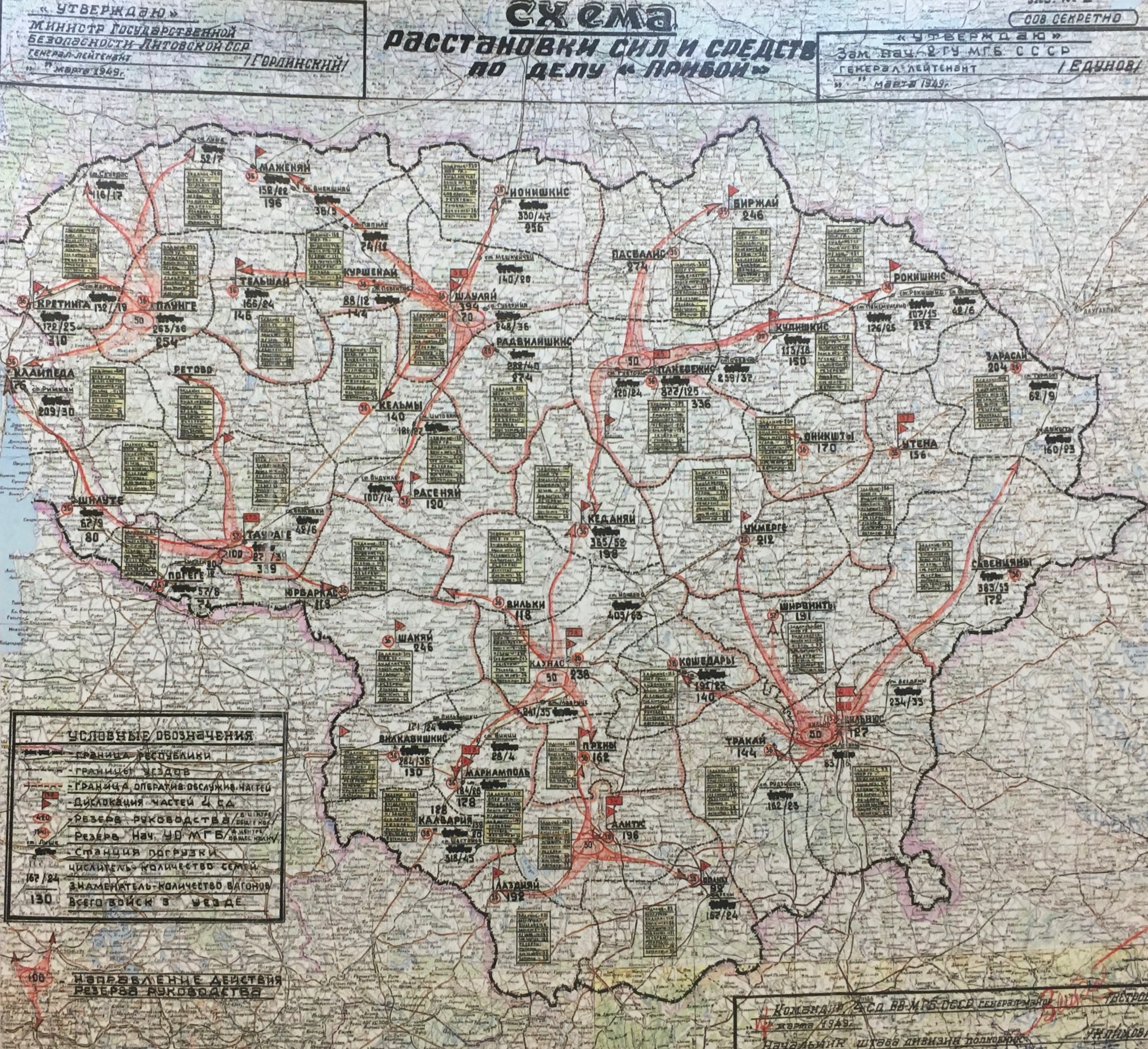
- Plan of deportations of the civilian population of Lithuania, created by the Soviet MGB
- Native name: Märtsiküüditamine (Estonian), Marta deportācijas (Latvian), Мартовская депортация (Russian)
- Date: 25–29 March 1949
- Also known as: March deportation
- Motive: Facilitate collectivization and defeat the Forest Brothers resistance
- Target: Balts (Lithuanians, Latvians); Estonians
- Perpetrator: Soviet Union
- Outcome: 90,000+ Baltic people of various ethnicities deported
- Deaths: 4,123
- Displaced: 90,000+

Operation Priboi (Russian: операция «Прибой» – Operation "Tidal Wave") was the code name for the biggest illegal Stalin-era Soviet mass deportation from the Baltic states on 25–28 March 1949. Also known as the March deportation (Estonian: märtsiküüditamine; Latvian: marta deportācijas; Russian: мартовская депортация). More than 90,000 Estonians, Latvians and Lithuanians, labeled as "enemies of the state", were deported to forced settlements in inhospitable Siberian areas of the Soviet Union. Over 70% of the deportees were either women, or children under the age of 16.

Portrayed as a "dekulakization" campaign, the illegal operation was intended to facilitate collectivisation and to eliminate the support base for the armed resistance of the Forest Brothers against the illegal Soviet occupation. The deportation fulfilled its purposes: by the end of 1949, 93% of farms in Latvia and 80% of the farms in Estonia were collectivized. In Lithuania, progress was slower and the Soviets organized another large deportation known as Operation Osen in late 1951. The deportations were for "eternity" with no way to return. During the de-Stalinization and Khrushchev Thaw, deportees were gradually released and some of them managed to return, though many of their descendants still live in Siberian towns and villages to this day.

As the general situation in the Soviet Union had improved since the end of the war, this mass deportation did not result in as many casualties as previous deportations, with a reported mortality rate of less than 15 percent. Due to the high death rate of deportees during the first few years of their Siberian exile, caused by the failure of Soviet authorities to provide suitable living conditions at the destinations, whether through neglect or premeditation, some sources consider these deportations an act of genocide. Based on the Martens Clause and the principles of the Nuremberg Charter, the European Court of Human Rights has held that the March deportation constituted a crime against humanity.

== Decision ==
Collectivisation in the Baltic states was introduced in early 1947, but the progress was slow. Despite new heavy taxes on farmers and intense propaganda, only about 3% of farms in Lithuania and Estonia joined kolkhozes by the end of 1948. Borrowing from the collectivisation experiences of the early 1930s, kulaks were named as the primary obstacle and became targets of repressions.

It is unclear when the idea of a mass deportation was advanced. On 18 January 1949, leaders of all three Baltic republics were called to report to Joseph Stalin. That day, during a session of the Politburo of the Communist Party of the Soviet Union, the decision was made to carry out the deportations. On 29 January, the top secret decision No. 390-138 ss (Note: Initials ss stand for top secret (совершенно секретно).) was adopted by the Council of Ministers of the Soviet Union, approving the deportation of kulaks, nationalists, bandits (i.e. Forest Brothers), their supporters and families from Lithuania, Latvia, and Estonia. (Note: Transcript of the order in original Russian was published in Werth, Nicolas; Mironenko, Sergei V., eds. (2004). История сталинского Гулага. Конец 1920–х- первая половина 1950–х годов. Собрание документов в 7 томах [The History of Stalin's Gulag. From the Late 1920s to the First Half of the 1950s. Collection of Documents in Seven Volumes] (PDF) (in Russian). Vol. 1. Moscow: Russian Political Encyclopedia (ROSSPEN). pp. 517–519. ISBN 5-8243-0605-2. Archived from the original (PDF) on 4 June 2016. English translation of the order was published in Rahi-Tamm & Kahar 2009, pp. 385–386.) The decision specified deportee quotas for each republic: 8,500 families or 25,500 people from Lithuania, 13,000 families or 39,000 people from Latvia, and 7,500 families or 22,500 people from Estonia. Lists of kulaks to be deported were to be compiled by each republic and approved by each republic's Council of Ministers. It also listed responsibilities of each Soviet ministry: the Ministry of State Security (MGB) was responsible for gathering the deportees and transporting them to the designated railway stations; the Ministry of Internal Affairs (MVD) was responsible for the transportation to the forced settlements, provision of employment at the destination, and continued surveillance and administration; Ministry of Finance was to allocate sufficient funds (5.60 rubles per person per day of travel); Ministry of Communications was to provide the railway stock cars; Ministries of Trade and Health were to provide food and health care en route to the destination. Given just two months for preparations, the various agencies began marshaling resources.

== Preparations ==
On 28 February 1949, Viktor Abakumov, the minister of MGB, signed the USSR MGB order No. 0068 for the preparation and execution of the mass deportations. Lieutenant General Pyotr Burmak commanded the MGB troops while Lieutenant General Sergei Ogoltsov, Deputy Minister of MGB, was in charge of the overall MGB role in the deportation. Burmak set up his headquarters in Riga. The success of the operation depended on its suddenness to prevent mass panic, escape attempts, or retaliations by the Forest Brothers. Therefore, secrecy was of paramount importance.

=== Compilation of deportee lists ===
Special MGB representatives were dispatched to various local offices of MGB to form operative staff that would select the deportees and compile a file on each family. The information was gathered from many different sources, including republican MGB files on "nationalists", local MGB files on "bandits" (i.e. Forest Brothers), local executive committee files and tax records on "kulaks", border guard and navy files on emigrants. Since there was not enough time to investigate people's attitudes or activities during the German occupation, there were many contradictory cases where Communist activists were deported but Nazi collaborators were not. This led to widespread confusion and uncertainty as to what offenses warranted deportation and what actions could guarantee safety. Deportees often blamed local informants of MGB who, they believed, acted out of petty revenge or greed, but Estonian researchers found that deportee lists were compiled with minimal local input.

List of kulaks were to be prepared by local executive committees and officially approved by the Council of Ministers, but due to the tight deadline and top secret nature of the task, local MGB offices compiled their own lists of kulaks. This caused much confusion during the operation. Local MGB offices would prepare summary certificates for each family and send them for approval to the republican MGB office. For example, by 14 March, Estonian MGB approved summary certificates for 9,407 families (3,824 kulaks and 5,583 nationalists and bandits) which created a reserve of 1,907 families above the quota. Overall, due to the lack of time, the files on deportees were often incomplete or incorrect. Therefore, from April to June, retrospective corrections were made – new files were added for people deported but not on deportee lists and files of those who escaped deportations were removed.

=== Deployment of additional troops ===
Additional internal troops units	To Estonia	To Latvia
1st Motorised Infantry Division (Moscow)	850	2,000
13th Motorised Infantry Division (Leningrad), one regiment	700	
7th Division (Minsk), one regiment	1,000	
4th Division (Lithuania), one regiment		1,000
Officers' Corps Training School (Sortavala, Karelia)	400	
Military Specialised Secondary School (Saratov)		1,000
Security Corps sergeants	1,400	500
Total	4,350	4,500

Due to the immense scale of the Operation Priboi, which spanned three Soviet republics, considerable resources were needed. MGB needed to assemble personnel, transport vehicles, and communication equipment all the while keeping the operation secret. MGB also needed to draw up plans for where the operative groups to be deployed and how the deportees to be transported to the railway stations. Local MGB officials, who numbered 634 in Estonia, were not sufficient and 1,193 MGB operatives from other parts of the Soviet Union were transferred to Estonia alone. In addition to the troops already stationed in Latvia and Estonia, an additional 8,850 soldiers were deployed to Estonia and Latvia from other parts of the Soviet Union to take part in the operation. They arrived to the republics between 10 and 15 March. They were not told of their actual mission until later and their arrival was explained as a military exercise.

An additional 5,025 submachine guns and 1,900 rifles were brought in to ensure that the operatives were sufficiently armed. Telecommunications was a vital component to ensure smooth running of the operation, thus the MGB commandeered all civilian telephone exchanges for the duration and brought in an extra 2,210 MGB communications personnel. 4,437 freight railway cars were delivered. A total of 8,422 trucks were organised. 5,010 civilian trucks were commandeered and the remaining vehicles were military origin, including 1,202 imported from the Leningrad Military District, 210 from the Byelorussian Military District and 700 from Internal Troops. These additional vehicles were stationed just outside the border of the Baltic Republics in advance so as not to raise suspicion and sent in at the start of the operation.

The preparation on the MVD side was slower. USSR MVD order No. 00225 instructing various branches of MVD to prepare for the deportation and to assist the MGB was issued only on 12 March. Six months later, an internal review commission criticized the delay. Special representatives of MVD arrived to local districts only on 18–22 March.

== Implementation ==
=== Assembly of operative teams ===
Personnel involved	Number	Proportion (%)
USSR MGB personnel	8,215	10.8
USSR Internal Troops	21,206	27.8
Republican Destruction Battalion troops	18,387	24.1
Communist Party activists	28,404	37.1
Total	76,212	100.0

The original order by the Council of Ministers of the Soviet Union scheduled the deportation between 20 and 25 March, but the start of the operation was delayed to the early morning of 25 March. Operatives were deployed to the countryside starting 21 March. A deportation of a family was carried out by a small nine–ten-man operative team, which included three USSR MGB agents ("troika"), two republican Destruction Battalion soldiers and four or five local Communist Party activists who were armed by the MGB. Since the operatives were assembled from other parts of the Soviet Union, they were not familiar with local geography and that became a frequent reason for the failure to deport the designated family. Care was taken to ensure that each operative team included at least one member of the Communist Party of the Soviet Union or Komsomol to act as an ideological supervisor of the team.

Recruitment of the local Communist Party activists by partorgs was the last step. Since they needed to assemble a large force in a very short time, they used various excuses (such as discussion of spring sowing or cinema viewing) to call meetings of the Party or Komsomol. The activists were taken to the deportations directly from these meetings; others not selected for the operation were detained to preserve secrecy until its completion. The activists stayed in the household taking inventory of the confiscated property while soldiers escorted the deportees to the train stations. The activists were also important in explaining who was deported and why. Since these were locals, they were often familiar to the deportees and these activists, not the unknown soldiers, became the face and name of the deportations creating social tensions.

=== Roundup of families ===
On average, each operative team was assigned three to four specific families they needed to deport. After locating the assigned farm, the team was to search the premises, identify all residents, and complete their files. The families were allowed to pack some of their personal belongings (clothes, dishes, agricultural tools, domestic utensils) and food. Official instructions allotted up to 1,500 kilograms (3,300 lb) per family, but many did not pack sufficient supplies as they were given little time, were disoriented by the situation, or did not have their items with them. Property left behind was transferred to kolkhozes or sold to cover state expenses. Where available, the ownership of real estate and land was restored to the deportees and their heirs after the dissolution of the Soviet Union. Unlike the June deportation in 1941, the families deported in 1949 were not separated. People were transported to the train stations by various means—horse carts, trucks, or cargo ships (from the Estonian islands of Saaremaa and Hiiumaa).

As the people had already experienced mass deportations, they knew the signs (such as arrival of fresh troops and vehicles) and attempted to hide. Therefore, the Soviets set up ambushes, tracked down and interrogated relatives, and carried out mass identity documents checks, among other measures. Against regulations, MGB operatives would deliver children without parents to the train stations hoping that the parents would voluntarily show up. Not all fugitives were caught by such measures and later, in Lithuania, smaller actions and deportations were organized to locate those that escaped the first Operation Priboi in March.

=== Railway transportation ===
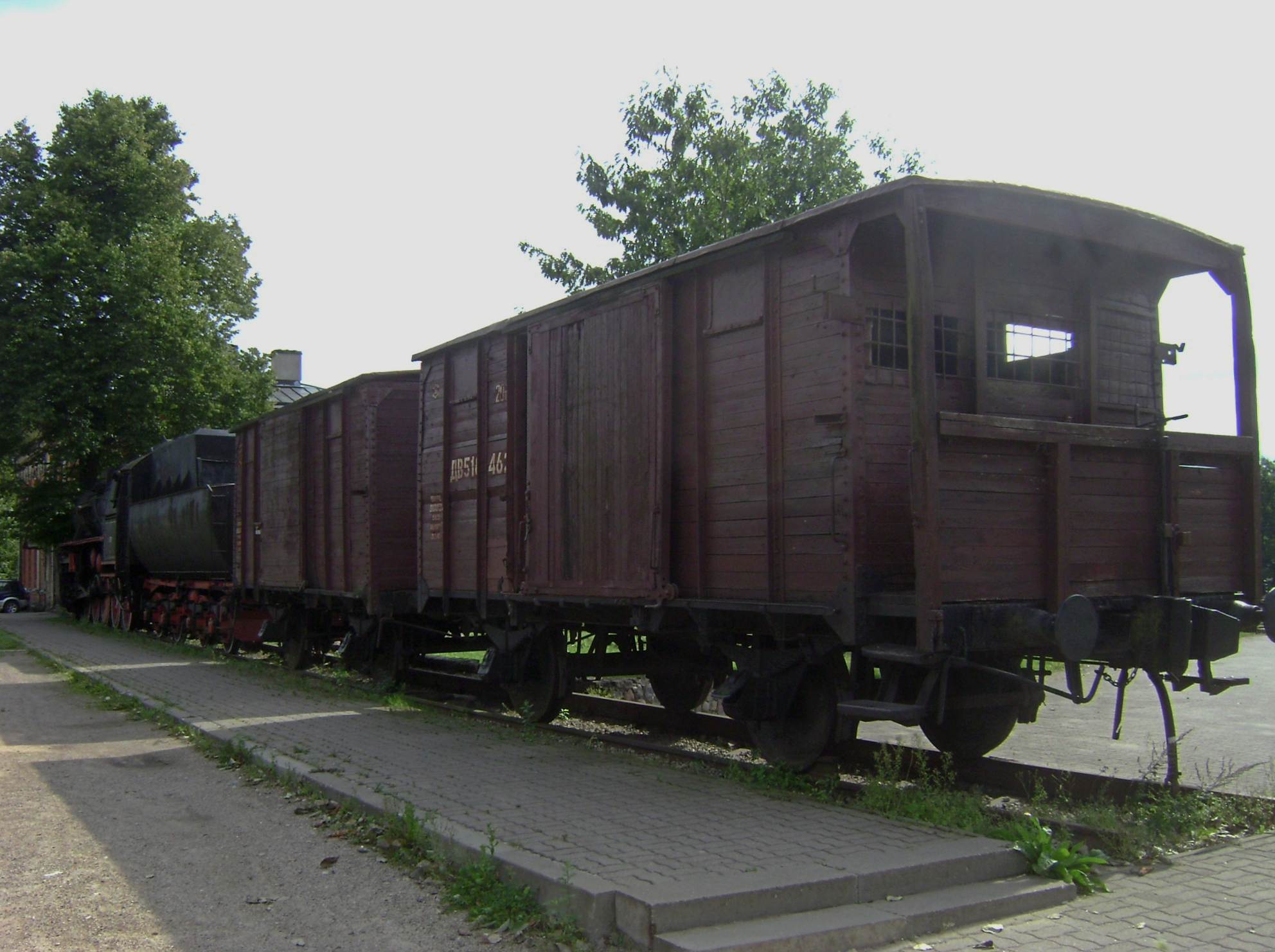
Freight train cars used to transport deportees (on display in Naujoji Vilnia)

Once loaded onto the trains, the deportees became the responsibility of the MVD. The loading stations needed special supervision and security to prevent escapes therefore they were, if possible, away from towns to prevent the gathering of deportee family members, friends, or onlookers. MVD also recruited informants from among the deportees and placed people categorized as flight risk under heavier guard. The train cars were mostly standard 20-ton freight cars (Russian: Нормальный товарный вагон) with no amenities. The cars, on average, fit 35 people and their baggage which means about 0.5 square metres (5.4 sq ft) of space per person. The last train left Lithuania in the evening of 30 March.

Not only the stations, but also the railways were patrolled. In Estonia, the patrols were attacked in three separate incidents. One of these incidents near Püssi resulted in the derailment of three railway cars on March 27. The patrols, among other things, picked up letters thrown out the train window by the deportees. The letters would usually inform about the deportation, send farewells to relatives and homeland, complain about conditions on the train, and express anti-Soviet feelings. On average, the train ride lasted about two weeks, but could take almost a month. For example, a train left Võru on March 29 and arrived to Makaryevo station in Svirsk on April 22. According to an MVD report from 30 May, from Estonian deportees, 45 people died en route and 62 were removed from the trains due to medical conditions.

== Results ==
Estonian deportees in Siberia – 28% of deportees were children under the age of 16

Some 72% of deportees were women and children under the age of 16. Kruglov, the Soviet Internal Affairs Minister, reported to Stalin on May 18 that 2,850 were "decrepit solitary old people", 1,785 children without parents to support them, and 146 disabled. About 15% of the deportees were over the age of 60. There were people of very old age; for example, a 95-year-old woman was deported from Švenčionys District, Lithuania.

Deportees by age, sex and nationality
Republic	Trains	Families	People	Men	Women	Children (under 16)
Estonia	19	7,471	20,480	4,566 or 22.3%	9,866 or 48.2%	6,048 or 29.5%
Latvia	33	14,173	41,708	11,135 or 26.7%	19,535 or 46.8%	11,038 or 26.5%
Lithuania	24	8,985	28,656	8,929 or 31.2%	11,287 or 39.4%	8,440 or 29.5%
Total	76	30,629	90,844	24,630 or 27.1%	40,688 or 44.8%	25,526 or 28.1%
Heinrihs Strods provides higher totals: 20,713 people from Estonia, 42,149 people from Latvia, 31,917 people from Lithuania for a total of 94,779

== Aftermath ==
Location of "special settlements" for deported Balts
Region of the Soviet Union	Families	People	Average family size	% of total deportees
Amur Oblast	2,028	5,451	2.7	5.8
Irkutsk Oblast	8,475	25,834	3.0	27.3
Krasnoyarsk Krai	3,671	13,823	3.8	14.6
Novosibirsk Oblast	3,152	10,064	3.2	10.6
Omsk Oblast	7,944	22,542	2.8	23.8
Tomsk Oblast	5,360	16,065	3.0	16.9
Total	30,630	93,779	3.1	99.0

The deportation was a shock to Estonian and Latvian societies. The rate of collectivisation jumped from 8% to 64% from 20 March to 20 April in Estonia and from 11% to more than 50% from 12 March to 9 April in Latvia. By the end of the year, 80% Estonian and 93% Latvian farms joined kolkhozes. In Lithuania, which had the stronger Forest Brother movement and already experienced a mass deportation in May 1948 (Operation Vesna), the impact was not as great and the collectivisation rate was 62% by the end of 1949. Therefore, the Soviets organized another large deportation from Lithuania in April 1949 specifically targeting those who had escaped the Operation Priboi (approx. 3,000 people) and another mass deportation known as Operation Osen in late 1951 (more than 20,000 people).

The additional troops brought for the operation left Latvia and Estonia on 3–8 April. By a decree of the Presidium of the Supreme Soviet, orders and medals for the successful completion of Operation Priboi were to be granted. 75 people were awarded the Order of the Red Banner, their names published in Pravda on 25 August 1949. On 26 August, Pravda published the names of 17 people awarded the Order of the Great Patriotic War, First Class for courage and heroism displayed during the operation.

The deportees were exiled "for eternity" and no right of return to their home, with the penalty of twenty years of hard labour for attempted escapes; 138 new commandantures were set up to monitor the deportees, censor their mail, and prevent escapes. Deportees were not permitted to leave their designated area and were required to report to the local MVD commandant once a month, failure of which was a punishable offense. The deportees were generally given jobs in kolkhozes and sovkhozes, with a small handful employed in forestry and manufacturing. Living conditions varied greatly by destination, but there was housing shortage almost everywhere. Deportees lived in barracks, farm sheds, mud huts, or became tenants of locals. The conditions were also very dependent on how many working-age people there were in a family as bread was allotted based on workdays, not headcount. Some relatives from home were able to send food packages that alleviated the worst hunger. By 31 December 1950, 4,123 or 4.5% of the deportees died, including 2,080 children. During this same period, 903 children were born into exile.

== See also ==
- Commemoration Day for the Victims of Communist Genocide
- Soviet deportations from Estonia
- Soviet deportations from Latvia
- Soviet deportations from Lithuania
- Swedish extradition of Baltic soldiers
- Varlaukis railway station

== Bibliography ==
- Rahi-Tamm, Aigi (2008). "Preparing for the 1949 Deportations, Operation Priboi in the Estonian S.S.R." (PDF). In Flikaitis, Artūras; Miliauskas, Vytas; Baranauskienė, Albina (eds.). Communism – to the International Tribunal. Biznio mašinų kompanija. pp. 290–305. OCLC 750518462. Archived from the original (PDF) on 18 April 2023.
- Rahi-Tamm, Aigi; Kahar, Andres (2009). "The Deportation Operation "Priboi" in 1949" (PDF). In Hiio, Toomas; Maripuu, Meelis; Paavle, Indrek (eds.). Estonia Since 1944: Report of the Estonian International Commission for the Investigation of Crimes Against Humanity. Tallinn: Estonian International Commission for the Investigation of Crimes Against Humanity. pp. 361–384. ISBN 978-9949183005. Archived from the original (PDF) on 4 June 2023.
