= Varlaukis railway station =

Former railway station in Lithuania

Coordinates: 55.3492°N 22.6676°E

Varlaukis railway station (Lithuania)

Varlaukis railway station is a former railway station located in Lybiškiai, Jurbarkas District Municipality, Lithuania. Situated on the Pagėgiai–Šilėnai Railway, the station was built in 1933 and closed in 2001. In March 1949, it was one of the sites from which local residents, including a 10-month-old child, were deported to Siberia in cattle wagons.

== History ==
In 1916, during World War I, occupying German forces built a railway from Lauksargiai to Radviliškis. Varlaukis station was built in 1933. It is located in Lybiškiai, while Lybiškiai railway station is located west of Lybiškiai. The railway building is a typical example of small stations and has modernist features. An apartment building for station workers was built nearby. Up to 1995, the railway was used for passenger transport. The station was used for loading and unloading freight, including coal, fertilizers, agricultural machinery. Local companies used the station to ship timber and electrical cables. Due to decreasing traffic, the station was closed in 2001.

== Museum ==
In March 1949, during the Operation Priboi, about 60 families with infants were forcibly deported to Siberia from this station. Since 1996, the deportations are commemorated at the station on 14 June (Day of Mourning and Hope). In 2020, Jurbarkas District Municipality approved a plan to convert the station into a museum commemorating the deportations, Lithuanian partisans in the Jurbarkas district, and the experiences of "wolf children" (German orphans). In 2023 and 2024, the former station hosted exhibitions dedicated to wolf children and deportations.
