= Visaginas Municipality =

Visaginas Municipality Visagino savivaldybė
- Municipality
- Flag Coat of arms

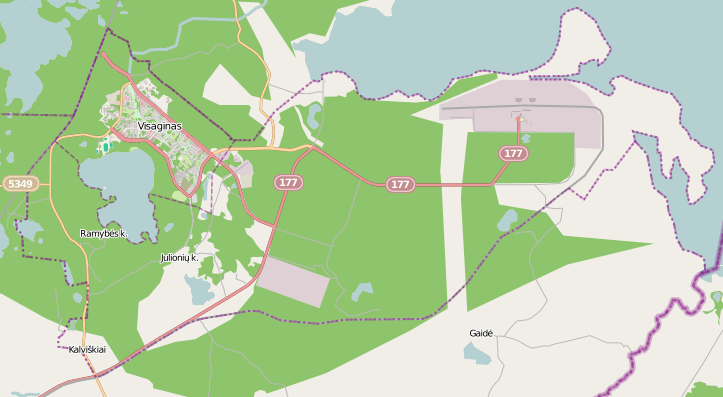
- A sketch of Visaginas Municipality

- Location within Lithuania Location within Europe
- Coordinates: 55.598°N 26.438°E
- Country: Lithuania
- Ethnographic region: Aukštaitija
- County: Utena County
- Established: 1994
- Administrative centre: Visaginas
- Settlements: 18

Area
  - Total: 58 km^{2} (22 sq mi)
  - Rank: 58th

Population (2021)
  - Total: 19,633
  - Rank: 43rd
  - Density: 340/km^{2} (880/sq mi)
  - Rank: 7th
- Telephone code: 386
- Major settlements: Visaginas (pop. 19,260)
- Website: www.visaginas.lt

The Visaginas Municipality (Lithuanian: Visagino savivaldybė) is a municipality of Lithuania, situated in the north-east of the country. It consists of the city of Visaginas (administrative centre of the municipality), 20 villages (kaimai) and one farmstead (viensėdis).

It has the most significant Russian minority population in Lithuania, with 47,36% of the population claiming Russian ethnicity as of 2025.

== Geography ==
Visaginas is known for the now-decommissioned Ignalina Nuclear Power Plant located here, by the Drūkšiai lake. Another major lake in the municipality is Visaginas.

Most of the villages of Visaginas are underpopulated. According to the 2021 Lithuanian census, only 7 villages had population at least 3: Ažukalviškė (5), Juliškė (25), Kalviškiai (7), Karlos (21), Lapušiškė (12), Magūnai (78), Tumelina(33).

== History ==
The municipality was formally established on 19 July 1994 as the Visaginas City Municipality (Visagino miesto savivaldybė) and came into actual existence following the local election on 25 March 1995. Initially the municipality was composed only of the city of Visaginas, but on 1 January 2003 its area was expanded by absorbing a part of the Ignalina District Municipality, and the Visaginas City Municipality was renamed to what it is known as now.
