= Urve Tamberg =

Estonian-Canadian author

- Born: Toronto, Ontario, Canada
- Occupations: Author; International Estonian Centre (KESKUS)
- Writing career
- Genres: Historical fiction; Young adult fiction
- Notable work: The Darkest Corner of the World

Urve Tamberg (/ˈɜːrvə/; born c. 1960s) is an Estonian-Canadian author of historical fiction known for her young adult debut novel The Darkest Corner of the World (2012). Her literary work explores the impact of the Soviet and Nazi occupations of Estonia during the 20th century. In addition to her work as a writer, Tamberg has a background in strategic planning and management and currently serves on the Board of Directors for Head Injury Rehabilitation Ontario (HIRO).

== Early life and education ==
Tamberg is an only child and was born to Estonian refugee parents. She was raised in the Estonian diaspora community in Toronto.

Raised in a bilingual environment, Tamberg is fluent in both Estonian and English and attended Estonian language night school from the age of six. She also was a Girl Guide in an Estonian Canadian guide group that was formed by Estonian refugees as a way to preserve the culture abroad. She has explained that she leverages her bilingualism, especially her fluency in Estonian when conducting primary source research as she believes it allows her to create historically authentic narratives.

She attended the University of Toronto, where she earned a Bachelor of Science in Physical Therapy and later a Master of Business Administration (MBA).

== Career ==
Tamberg writes historical fiction for young adults. Her writing primarily focuses on the experiences of Estonians during the Soviet and Nazi occupations of World War II. She has stated that her transition to focus on literature was motivated by her parents' stories. She was also motivated by the fact that there were so few stories about Estonians in English. Tamberg's debut novel, The Darkest Corner of the World, was published in September 2012.

Following her debut, Tamberg was awarded a Canada Council for the Arts grant for professional writers to develop two sequels to The Darkest Corner of the World. The sequel, titled Halfway to Freedom, is set during the 1944 Soviet re-occupation of Estonia and follows the protagonist, Madli, as she chooses between escaping to the West or remaining with her family. Tamberg publicly announced on her website a third novel in the series called, Seeking Home, that focuses on the Madli and her family's post-war displacement and a series of projects focusing on narrative non-fiction works concerning Estonian history including a picture book on the Singing Revolution, an alphabet book about Estonia, and a narrative account of The Baltic Chain.

Tamberg was the President of the Board of Directors of the Canadian Children's Book Centre (CCBC), a national non-profit organisation supporting the Canadian children's publishing industry. She is a member of the Canadian Society of Children's Authors, Illustrators and Performers (CANSCAIP), the Society of Children's Book Writers and Illustrators (SCBWI), and The Writers' Union of Canada (TWUC).

== Publications ==
Title	Publication date	Publisher
The Darkest Corner of the World	September 2012	Dancing Cat Books, Cormant Books, EisTam (2nd ed.)
Halfway to Freedom	Not yet released	—
Seeking Home	Not yet released	—

== Recognition ==
Title	Year	Awards and mentions	Status
The Darkest Corner of the World	September 2012	Resource Links Magazine, Best of 2012 list	Excellent (E)
The Darkest Corner of the World	December 2012	CM Magazine	3.4 of 4
The Darkest Corner of the World	Summer 2013	CCBC Book News, featured review	Featured

== Personal life ==
Tamberg is an active representative within the Estonian-Canadian community. Tamberg served as the Executive Manager for the $25 million International Estonian Centre (KESKUS) in Toronto. She is part of the steering committee overseeing government relations and funding for the project and is a part of the project's communications and capital campaign committees. She was on the Board of Directors for the Estonian House in Toronto.

She is also part of the Board of Directors for Head Injury Rehabilitation Ontario (HIRO).

Tamberg has three children.

== See also ==
- Estonian Canadians
- Forest Brothers
- German occupation of Estonia during World War II
- Mass flight of 1941
- Nazi occupations
- Singing Revolution
- Soviet occupation of the Baltic states (1944)
