= Operation Osen =

1951 mass deportation from Lithuania

Operation Osen (Russian: Операция «Осень», romanized: Operatsiya "Osen", lit. 'Operation Autumn/Fall"', Lithuanian: Operacija „Ruduo“) was a mass deportation carried out by the Ministry of State Security (MGB) in the territory of the Lithuanian SSR in the autumn of 1951. During the operation, more than 5,000 families (over 20,000 people) were transported to remote regions of the Soviet Union. It was the last large deportation in the series of Soviet deportations from Lithuania. The operation was a dekulakization campaign specifically targeting peasants who resisted collectivisation and refused to join the kolkhozes (collective farms).

== Preparations ==
After two large deportations in May 1948 (code name Vesna) and in March 1949 (code name Priboi), the progress of collectivisation in the Lithuanian SSR jumped from 3.9% in January 1949 to 60.5% in January 1950. However, the pace of collectivization in Lithuania was still not as rapid as in Latvia or Estonia, where 93% and 80% of the farms were collectivized by the end of 1949. Soviet authorities, striving to complete the forced collectivisation in Lithuania, initiated preparations for a mass deportation of peasants who refused to join newly established kolkhozes. On September 5, 1951, the Council of Ministers of the Soviet Union issued a decree number 3309-1568cc "On the deportation of kulaks and their families from the Lithuanian territory". The decree was signed by Joseph Stalin, Premier of the Soviet Union, and Mikhail Pomaznev, Administrator of Affairs of the Council of Ministers, and ordered "to eternally transfer 4000 anti-kolkhoz kulaks and their families to Krasnoyarsk Krai and Tomsk Oblast".

The briefing of the Ministry of State Security (MGB) of the Lithuanian SSR was held on September 6. Lists of the deportees were to be prepared by local administration and committees of the Communist Party of Lithuania. An aggregate list was prepared by MGB listed 4,215 families (14,950 people). A number of those had already joined kolkhozes and were labelled "kulak sympathizers". MGB further compiled primary and auxiliary lists of 4,007 and 998 families. The lists were approved by the Council of Ministers of the Lithuanian SSR. The lists included not only Lithuanians, but also members of the Polish minority in Lithuania. Though data is not complete, it is estimated that some 1,100 to 1,200 Poles were deported during the operation.

== Deportations ==
The deportation in the autumn of 1951 was carried in several separate events:

Date	People deported data by Anušauskas	People deported data by Tumavičius	Destination	Notes
September 20–21, 1951	3,807	2,987	Irkutsk Oblast	mainly relatives, supporters and messengers of partisans
October 2–3, 1951	16,150 + 335	15,537	Tomsk Oblast and Krasnoyarsk Krai	including 5,278 children, 39 of which died during the transfer
November 30, 1951	452		Biysky District of the Altai Krai	mostly peasants

The operation was led by Piotr Kapralov, Minister of State Security of the Lithuanian SSR, and Yakov Yedunov, head of the Third Chief Directorate of MGB. Every few hours they sent updates on the progress of the operation to Semyon Ignatyev, head of MGB. The operation required great manpower and employed 3,818 MGB officers, 11,270 MGB internal troops, soldiers of destruction battalions, and militias as well as some 8,000 activists of the Communist Party. These men were organised into more than 3,000 operational units, consisting of one MGB operative, two men from destruction battalions, two MGB soldiers and activists. A single unit was responsible for the deportation of one to three families: waking up the family (the deportations were carried at night), ensuring that no one escaped, listing the deportees and checking their data, supervising packing of family's personal belongings, and bringing them to the designated railway station. Party activists stayed in the households to register left property, which was to come under the possession of the kolkhoz. The deportees were loaded onto cattle cars with no amenities and spent about a month on their journey to Tomsk Oblast and Krasnoyarsk Krai.
