= Commemoration Day for the Victims of Communist Genocide =

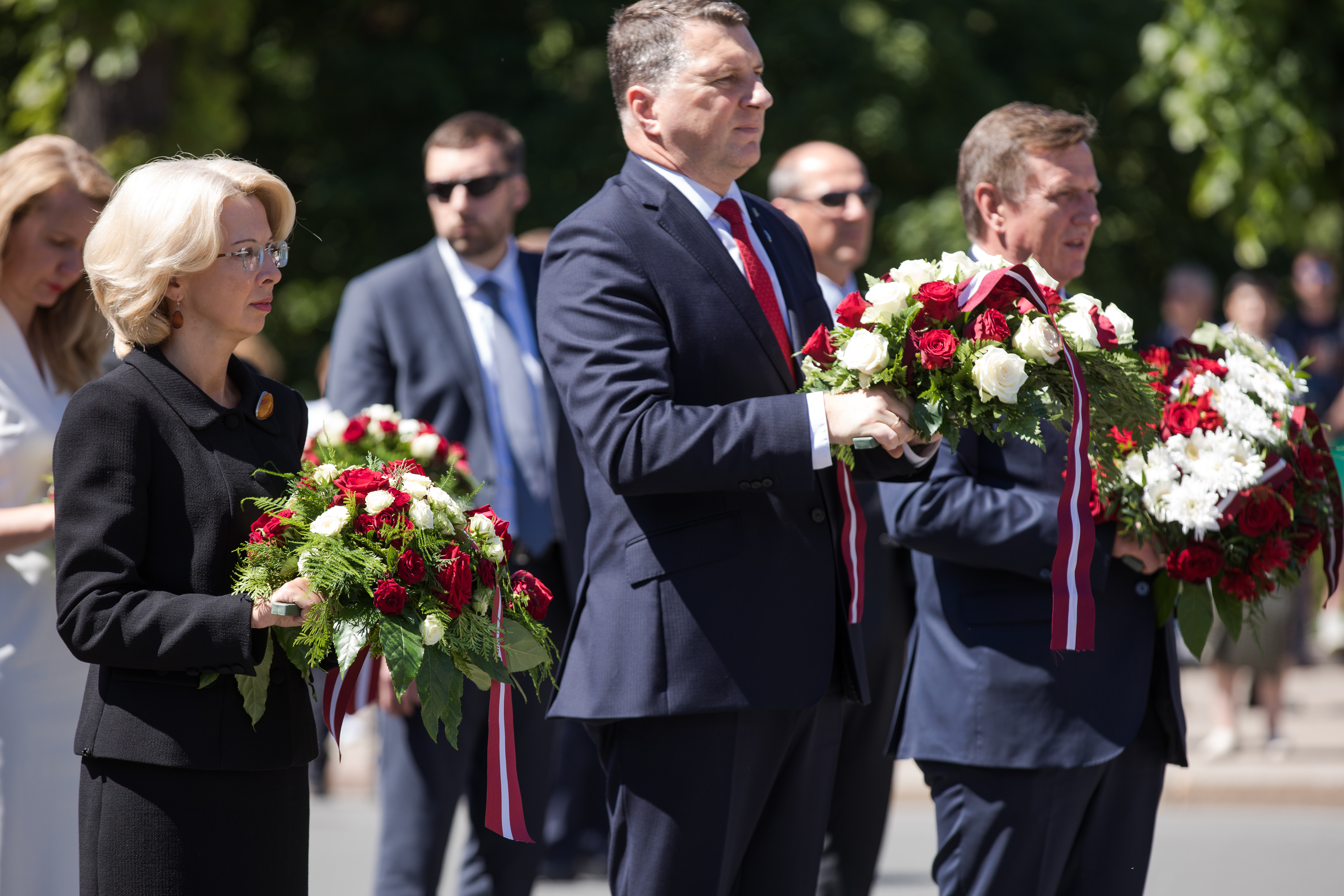
Speaker of the Saeima Ināra Mūrniece, President of Latvia Raimonds Vējonis and Prime Minister of Latvia Māris Kučinskis (left to right) during a 2018 Commemoration Day for the Victims of Communist Genocide flower laying ceremony at the Freedom Monument

Commemoration Day for the Victims of Communist Genocide (Latvian: Komunistiskā genocīda upuru piemiņas diena) commemorates the Soviet deportations from Latvia. It is observed on both 25 March and 14 June when the respective 1949 March deportation and the 1941 June deportation took place. Commemoration Day for the Victims of Communist Genocide is marked by a procession organized by the Latvian Association of Politically Repressed Persons from the Museum of the Occupation of Latvia to the Freedom Monument where flowers are laid and attended by the President of Latvia, Speaker of the Saeima and the Prime Minister of Latvia.

== See also ==
- Day of Remembrance of the Victims of Political Repressions
