= Russians in Lithuania =

Ethnic group in Lithuania

Total population
- 141,122 (census 2021); 141,500 (estimate 2026)

Regions with significant populations
- Vilnius, Visaginas, Klaipėda

Languages
- Russian, Lithuanian

Religion
- Eastern Orthodox Church (51.5%), Catholic Church (11.9%), Old Believers (11.8%).

Related ethnic groups
- Belarusians, Ukrainians

Russians in Lithuania (Russian: Русские в Литве, romanized: Russkiye v Litve, Lithuanian: Lietuvos rusai) number about 141,500 people, according to the Lithuanian estimates of 2026, or 4.9% of the total population of Lithuania.

== History ==
=== Imperial era ===
First early settlements of Ruthenians in Lithuania proper date back to late medieval ages when the first proto-Russian merchants and craftsmen began to permanently reside in several Lithuanian towns. In the late 17th century they were joined by many Russian Old Believers who settled in eastern Lithuania, escaping religious persecution in Russia.

The second, larger, influx of Russians followed the annexation of Lithuania by the Russian Empire during the Partitions of Poland in the late 18th century. Under Russian rule, power in the region remained primarily in the hands of the Lithuanian nobility, but some administrative jobs were gradually taken over by Russians, who also settled in cities such as Vilnius and Kaunas. Also after the uprising of 1863 in Poland some estates had been confiscated from the local nobility and given to Russian officials. Many of the Russians who migrated to Lithuania were soldiers, sailors, and merchants.

=== Soviet era ===
Most of the present-day Russians in Lithuania are migrants from the Soviet era and their descendants. Following the terms of the 1939 Molotov–Ribbentrop pact, the Soviet Union occupied and annexed Lithuania, Latvia, and Estonia in 1940. After Germany attacked the Soviet Union in 1941, the three countries quickly fell under German control. Many Russians, especially Communist party members who had arrived in the area with the initial annexation, retreated to Russia; those who fell into German hands were treated harshly, many were murdered.

As the war drew to a close, the Soviet Union resumed its occupation of the Baltic states in 1944–1945. Western democracies did not recognize the Soviet occupation.

Immediately after the war, Joseph Stalin carried out a major resettlement campaign in the three Baltic Soviet republics. The Russians, along with a smaller number of other Soviet ethnic groups, who migrated to the Baltic were mostly factory workers who settled in major urban areas, as well as military personnel stationed in the region in significant numbers due to the border location of the Baltic States within the Soviet Union. Many military retirees chose to stay in the region, which featured higher living standards compared to most of Russia.

After Stalin's death in 1953, the government of the Lithuanian SSR, led by the "communist nationalist" Antanas Sniečkus, objected to the resettlement policies and managed to slow down the influx of Russians by letting Lithuanians fill some of the higher party positions. The flow of immigrants did not stop entirely, and there were further waves of Russian workers who came to work on major construction projects, such as power plants.

At the last Soviet census in 1989, 9.4 percent of Lithuania's population were ethnic Russians, with a few more percent comprising other Soviet nationalities.

=== Modern era ===
Russians who reside in Lithuania live mainly in urban areas. In Vilnius they make up 13% of the population, and 28% in Klaipėda. Kaunas has just 4.4% ethnic Russians. The town of Visaginas was built for workers at the Ignalina Nuclear Power Plant and therefore has an ethnic Russian majority (56%).

== Statistics ==
As of 2011 according to census

Top 10 municipalities with Russian diaspora:

- Visaginas Municipality (51.91%)
- Klaipėda City Municipality (19.63%)
- Zarasai District Municipality (18.71%)
- Švenčionys District Municipality (13.28%)
- Vilnius City Municipality (11.94%)
- Ignalina District Municipality (8.31%)
- Trakai District Municipality (8.27%)
- Jonava District Municipality (8.22%)
- Vilnius District Municipality (8.01%)
- Elektrėnai Municipality (5.85%)

Top 10 cities with Russian diaspora:

- Visaginas (52.16%)
- Zarasai (23.07%)
- Klaipėda (19.63%)
- Pabradė (18.45%)
- Švenčionys (17.32%)
- Dūkštas (16.89%)
- Grigiškės (15.26%)
- Lentvaris (11.97%)
- Vilnius (11.88%)
- Baltoji Vokė (11.26%)

Top 10 cities by number of Russians:

- Vilnius: 62,304
- Klaipėda: 31,872
- Kaunas: 11,913
- Visaginas: 11,644
- Šiauliai: 4,512
- Jonava: 2,528
- Panevėžys: 2,434
- Grigiškės: 1,659
- Zarasai: 1,653
- Lentvaris: 1,330

== Notable Russians in Lithuania ==
Famous modern Lithuanian Russians include:

- Vladimir Romanov, businessman and former owner of Heart of Midlothian F.C. football club, citizen of Lithuania (Originally from Tver Oblast, Russia).
- Fedor Černych, Russian-born Lithuanian professional footballer who plays for the Lithuania national football team (Originally from Moscow, Russia).
- Viktor Uspaskich, former leader of the Lithuanian Labour Party, former Lithuanian minister of the economy, former member of the Lithuanian parliament, the Seimas, and the current member of the European Parliament elected from Lithuania (Originally from Arkhangelsk Oblast, Russia).
- Sasha Son, singer, represented Lithuania in the Eurovision Song Contest 2009.

== See also ==
- Lithuania–Russia relations
- Baltic Russians
- Ethnic Russians in post-Soviet states
- Lithuanians in Russia
