= The Darkest Corner of the World =

2012 novel by Urve Tamberg

- Second edition cover
- Author: Urve Tamberg
- Language: English
- Genre: young adult historical fiction
- Set in: Estonia
- Published in: Canada
- Publisher: Dancing Cat Books (1st ed.); Cormant Books (1st ed.); EisTam (2nd ed.)
- Publication date: 2012
- Media type: Print (paperback), e-book
- Pages: 256
- Awards: Canadian Children's Book News in the "Best Books for Kids & Teens"
- ISBN: 9781770862142
- Followed by: Halfway to Freedom; Seeking Home

The Darkest Corner of the World is a debut novel by Urve Tamberg, published in September 2012. The novel was launched at Tartu College in Toronto. The book was published under a second edition and made available as an e-book in addition to the print edition.

== Synopsis ==
The novel is set in 1941 in Estonia. The story follows fifteen-year-old Madli as she discovers her neighbors have been deported, and her subsequent decision to leave home in the city of Tallinn to seek refuge at her grandfather's farm on Hiiumaa island. As the Nazis and Soviet Union vie for control of Estonia, Madli's community and family are divided physically and politically. She is forced to navigate the collision of Soviet, Nazi, and partisan forces such as the Forest Brothers.

== Themes ==
The novel is historical fiction with a character-driven study of female agency under authoritarianism with its main character embodying a resilient female lead navigating difficult personal decisions admid political crisis

Tamberg's work shares themes from dystopian literature, with the book's depiction of Soviet-era repression mirroring the repressed societies typical of the genre.

== Critical reception ==
The book was praised for its emotive portrayal of the past, educational value and accessibility for struggling readers. and Tamberg was praised for her ability to centre teen issues through Madli's maturity as she fights for her survival while also grappling with feelings and issues relatable to adolescents.

== Awards and honours ==
In 2012, The Darkest Corner of the World was included in the Canadian Children's Book Centre's Canadian Children's Book News in the "Best Books for Kids & Teens" guide, for touching on political issues and personal themes. The Canadian Review of Materials (CM Magazine) awarded the book 3.5 out of 4 stars.

Title	Year	Awards and mentions	Status
The Darkest Corner of the World	September 2012	Resource Links Magazine, Best of 2012 list	Excellent (E)
The Darkest Corner of the World	December 2012	CM Magazine	3.4 of 4
The Darkest Corner of the World	Summer 2013	CCBC Book News, featured review	Featured
