= Soviet deportations from Latvia =

Deportations from Latvia in 1941 and 1945–1951

In 1941 and 1945–1951, the Soviet government deported around 60,000 people from Latvia to inhospitable remote areas of the Soviet Union, which had occupied the country in 1940 and again in 1944/1945. Similar deportations were organized by the Soviet regime in the fellow occupied Baltic states of Estonia and Lithuania at the same time.

Alongside smaller forced population removals, the main waves of deportation were:

- The June deportation of 14 June 1941 of around 14,000–15,500 people and their families, including young children under the age of 10. This wave of deportations was mostly directed at the local Latvian and minority intelligentsia and political-social-economic elite, labeled by the Soviet security services as "suspect and socially alien elements". Out of all the deportees, approximately 5,000 or around 34%-40% of the total number died in exile, on the journey or in executions;
- The second deportation under Operation Priboi of 25 March 1949, when 42,113–43,000 people were deported. This time, the victims were mostly individual farmers, together with their family members, who were refusing to join the newly established collective farms (kolkhoz) and were included in the "kulak lists" of 1947, as well as members and supporters of the armed anti-Soviet resistance. Of the total number of deportees, more than 5000 people died in exile.

The deportations of 1944 are also sometimes singled out among these.

People from Latvia were mostly resettled to Amur, Tomsk, and Omsk regions. Several smaller scale deportations took place during the Soviet occupation, especially of ethnic Germans, stateless persons from Riga, and Jehovah's Witnesses. After destalinization, internment in camps was a punishment reserved for people engaged in "anti-Soviet" behaviour.

== See also ==
- Commemoration Day for the Victims of Communist Genocide
- Forest Brothers
- Birch bark letters from Siberia
