= Soviet deportations from Lithuania =

Mass deportations in 1941 and 1945–52 of Lithuanians

In 1941 and 1945–1952, the Soviet government carried out 35 mass deportations from Lithuania, a country that was occupied as a constituent socialist republic of the Soviet Union. At least 130,000 people, 70% of them women and children, were forcibly transported to labor camps and other forced settlements in remote parts of the Soviet Union, particularly in the Irkutsk Oblast and Krasnoyarsk Krai. Among the deportees were about 4,500 Poles. The number of deportees does not include approximately 150,000 people who became political prisoners – they were arrested, tried in Soviet courts, and imprisoned in Gulag camps.

Deportations of the civilians served a double purpose: repressing resistance to Sovietization policies in Lithuania and providing free labor in sparsely inhabited areas of the Soviet Union. Approximately 28,000 of Lithuanian deportees died in exile due to poor living conditions. After Stalin's death in 1953, the deportees were slowly and gradually released. The last deportees were released only in 1963. Some 60,000 managed to return to Lithuania, while 30,000 were prohibited from settling back in their homeland. Similar deportations took place in Latvia, Estonia, and other parts of the Soviet Union (see population transfer in the Soviet Union). Lithuania observes the annual Mourning and Hope Day on 14 June in memory of those deported.

== Historical background ==
In August 1939, Nazi Germany and Soviet Union signed the Molotov–Ribbentrop Pact, whereby Eastern Europe was divided into spheres of influence. The Baltic states (Lithuania, Latvia and Estonia) became part of the Russian sphere. The Soviet Union began preparations for the occupation and incorporation of these territories. First, it imposed mutual assistance treaties by which the Baltic states agreed to allow military bases for Soviet soldiers within their territory. Further steps were delayed by Winter War with Finland. By spring 1940, the war was over and Soviet Union increased its rhetoric accusing the Baltics of anti-Soviet conspiracy. Lithuania received Soviet ultimatum on 14 June 1940. Almost identical ultimatums to Latvia and Estonia followed two days later. Soviet Union demanded to allow an unlimited number of Soviet troops to enter the state territory and to form a more pro-Soviet government. The Soviets followed semi-constitutional procedures while forcibly transforming the independent Baltic states into the soviet socialist republics. They formed pro-Soviet People's Governments and held show elections to People's Parliaments. The annexation of the Lithuanian SSR, Latvian SSR, and Estonian SSR was completed by 6 August 1940.

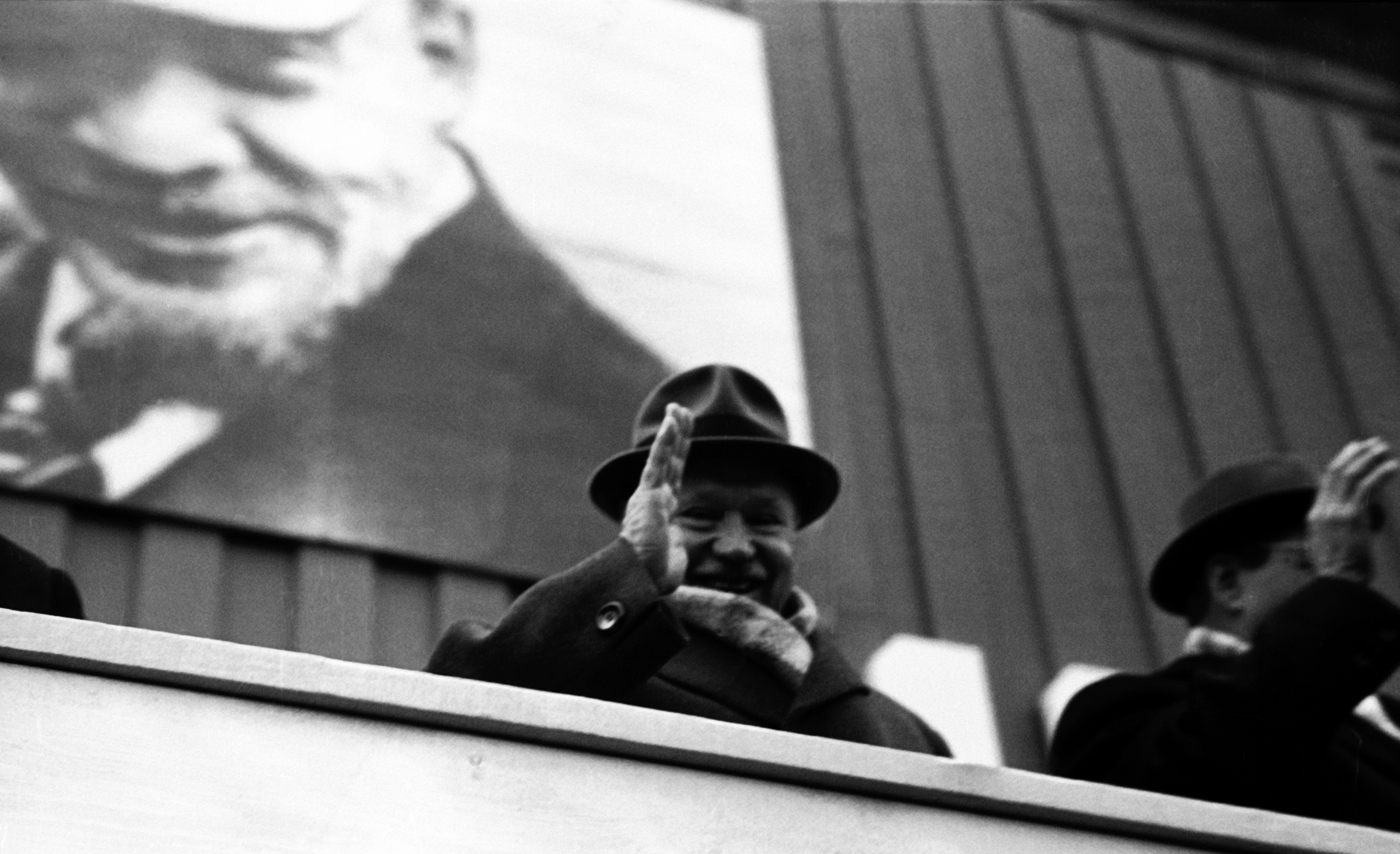
Antanas Sniečkus, the leader of the Communist Party of Lithuania from 1940 to 1974, supervised the mass deportations of Lithuanians.

The Soviets took control of political, economic, and cultural life in the three states. They rapidly implemented various sovietization policies: nationalization of private enterprises, land reform in preparation for collectivization, suppression of political, cultural, and religious organizations. Economic life was disrupted and standard of living decreased. Political activists and other people labeled as "enemy of the people" were arrested and imprisoned. In June 1941, some 17,000 Lithuanians were deported during the first deportation. Further repressions were prevented by Nazi invasion of the Soviet Union. Within a week Lithuania was under Nazi regime. At first the Germans were greeted as liberators from the oppressive Soviet rule. Even when the Lithuanians became disillusioned with the Nazi regime and organized resistance, notably the Supreme Committee for the Liberation of Lithuania, the Soviet Union remained "Public Enemy Number One".

In 1944, Nazi Germany was losing the war and Soviet Russia was making steady advances. In July 1944, Red Army reached the Lithuanian borders as part of the Operation Bagration. Most of the Lithuanian territory was taken during the Baltic Offensive. The last battle in Klaipėda ended in January 1945. Anticipating return of the Soviet terror, some 70,000 Lithuanians retreated into Germany ahead of the advancing Red Army. Generally those were political and cultural activists, artists and scientists, better educated and wealthier. Spending the first post-war years as displaced persons, they eventually settled in other countries, most often United States, forming culturally active Lithuanian diaspora. Those who remained in Lithuania were drafted into the army (some 80,000 soldiers). Men escaped the draft by joining the Lithuanian partisans, armed anti-Soviet resistance. Armed resistance inspired civil and political disobedience, to which the Soviets responded with persecutions: massacres, executions, arrests, deportations, etc.

== Deportation procedures ==
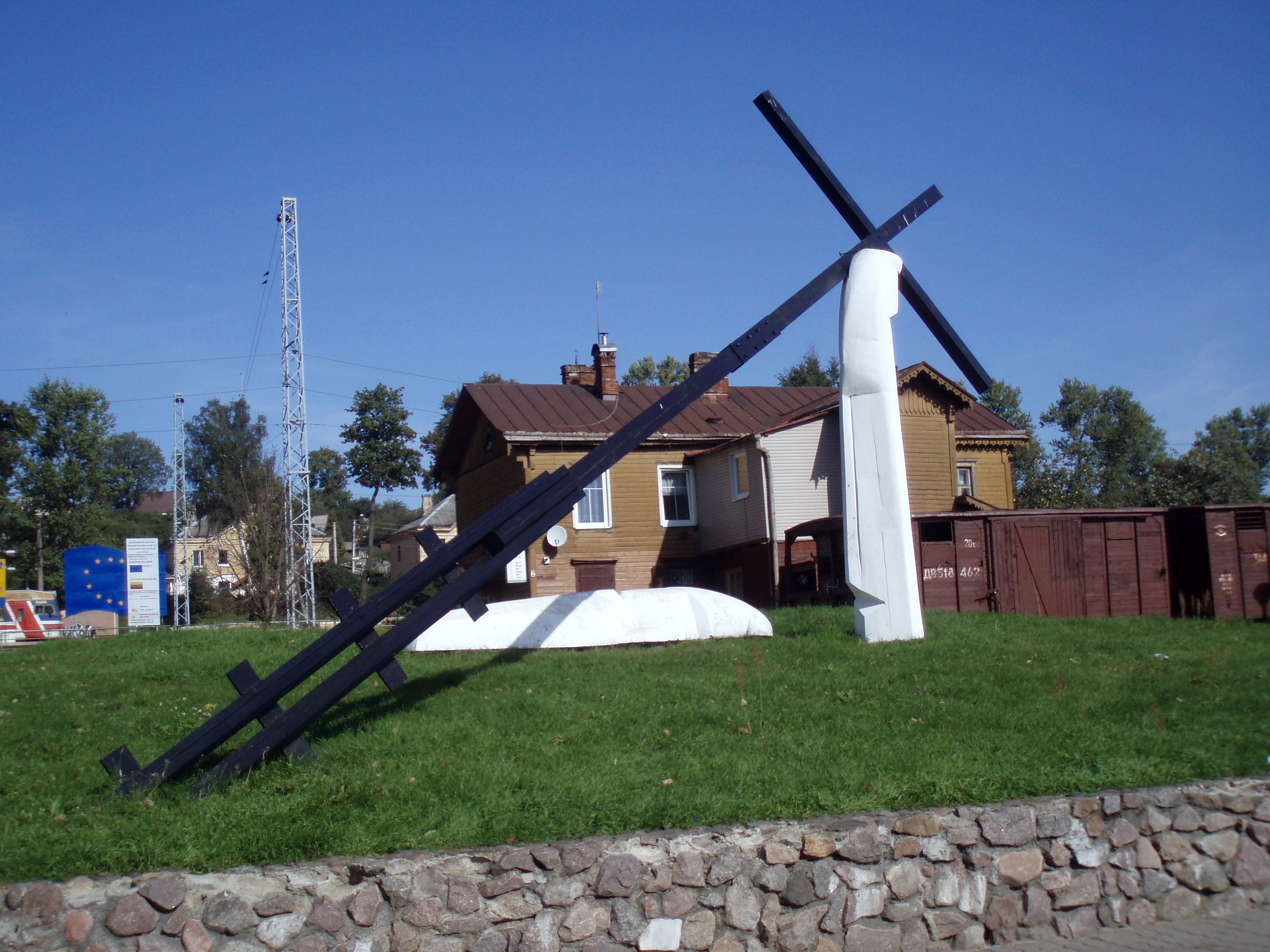
Monument to the deportees in Naujoji Vilnia – the last major train stop in Lithuania

Extra soldiers, equipment, and vehicles would be brought in to carry out the deportation. However, the deportations were kept strictly secret. There was a single public order by Juozas Bartašiūnas in February 1946. Armed groups of soldiers would surround a targeted house in the middle of the night. At night it was more likely to find everyone at home and easier to keep the operation quiet without alarming other residents. Everyone inside, including newborns and the elderly, would be ordered to pack food and other necessities (the exact list of what should or could be taken varied between deportations and depended on the generosity of the soldiers). If someone attempted to resist or run away, they would be shot or beaten. Often families would be separated and there were cases when parents, children, or spouses voluntarily reported to the train station to be deported with their captured relatives. The trains often used cattle cars with no amenities. The journey often lasted weeks if not months. The conditions were unsanitary, passengers often lacked food and water. Often trains would report deaths, especially among children and elderly, before reaching the destination. In one case, a train with deportees derailed killing 19 and injuring 57 people. While official instructions (for example Serov Instructions of 1941) often prescribed mild treatment of the deportees, in reality the captured people were subject to abuse and robbed of the few things that they were allowed to pack.

== Deportations ==
=== First deportation in 1941 ===
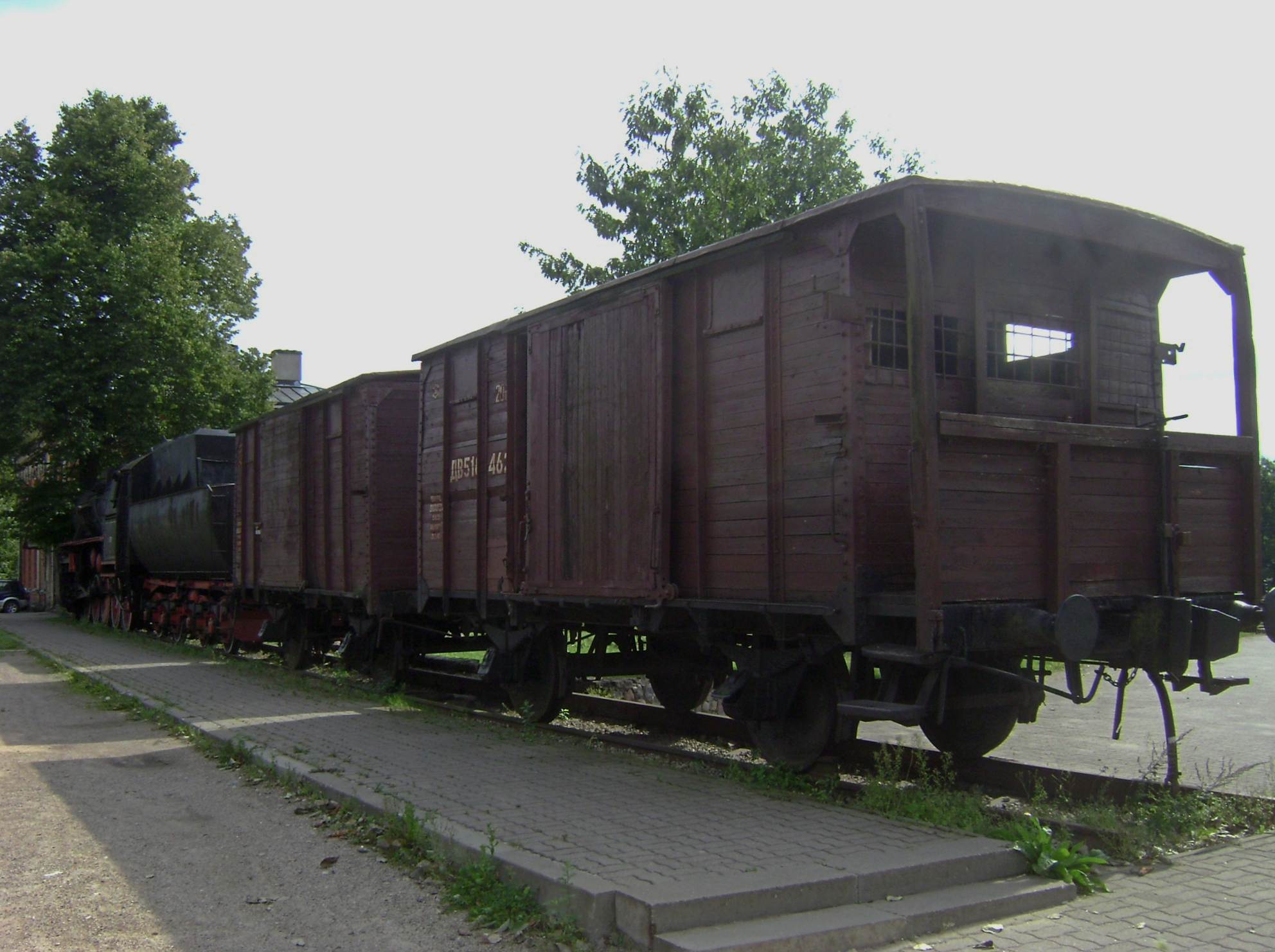
Train cars used to transport deportees (on display in Naujoji Vilnia)

The first mass deportation was carefully planned by the Soviets. Already in late summer 1940, high-ranking Soviet officials began hinting at planned mass arrests and deportations. NKVD began registering and tracking all "anti-Soviet elements", i.e. people who were judged to be harboring anti-Soviet attitudes solely based on their social standing, political affiliations, religious beliefs, etc. In particular, it targeted policemen, members of the Lithuanian Nationalist Union, Lithuanian Riflemen's Union, various Catholic organizations. In total, NKVD estimated that it needed to register 320,000 people or about 15% of the Lithuanian population, which with family members constituted about half of the population. In preparation for the deportation, NKVD drafted lists of people that would be deported during the first campaign, identified their incriminating background, traced their family members, and located their current residence. The list was fluid and kept changing. For example, a report dated 13 May 1941 identified 19,610 people that should be arrested and deported to prison camps and 2,954 people (mostly family members of those arrested) that should be deported to work camps. A month later, the numbers changed to 8,598 arrested and 13,654 deported family members clearly indicating a policy of eliminating entire anti-Soviet families.

The operation began during the Friday night of 13 June and was carried out by NKVD and NKGB troops from Russia, Ukraine, Belarus. Ivan Serov issued instructions, known as Serov Instructions, detailing how the deportees should be detained and transported to the trains. The instructions emphasized that the deportations should be carried out as stealthily as possible to minimize panic and resistance. Each four-member executive group was given the task of deporting two families. According to the official instructions, each family could take up to 100 kilograms (220 lb) of food, clothes, shoes, and other necessities but witnesses testified that these instructions were often not followed. Many families left unprepared for the journey or the life at the destination. According to the official instructions, signed by Mečislovas Gedvilas and Icikas Meskupas, property left by the deportees was to be divided into personal property (clothes, linens, furniture, tableware) and other (art, investments, trade inventory, real estate, farm animals, agricultural tools and machinery). Personal property was to be transferred to a representative of the deportee who would sell the property and would transfer the money to the original owners. Other property was to be confiscated and either sold or used by local Soviet officials. These instructions were not followed and people reported widespread looting of the left property.

The deportations continued, but on 16 June it was counted that the Soviets were still missing about 1,400 people from their list. Needing to meet their quotas, Soviet officials hurriedly arrested another 2,000 people on 16-18 June. The trains with deportees gathered in Naujoji Vilnia where men (using various excuses of needing additional inspection, questioning, or paperwork) were separated from their families and loaded onto trains heading towards prison camps. In total, there were 17 trains; they moved out on 19 June and reached their destinations between 30 June and 9 July. An official NKVD report, prepared on 19 June, accounted for 17,485 deportees, but the official statistics was incomplete and confused. The Genocide and Resistance Research Centre of Lithuania has traced and published the fate of 16,246 deportees.

=== First post-war deportations ===
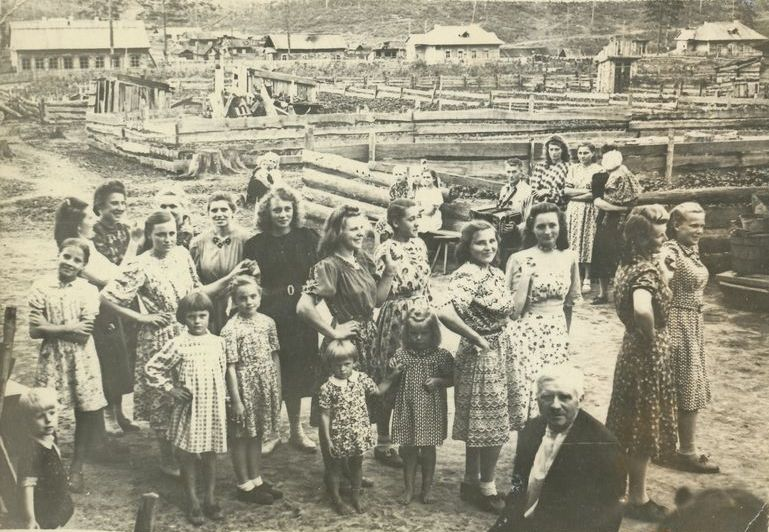
A group of Lithuanian deportees in Ziminsky District, Irkutsk Oblast

By 1944, Nazi Germany was retreating along the Eastern Front and Soviet forces reached the territory of Lithuania by mid-1944. In October 1944, Soviet officials, including Sergei Kruglov who had experience deporting the Chechen and Ingush people, began circulating ideas about deporting families of "bandits" – men who avoided conscription into the Red Army and joined the Lithuanian partisans. However, such measures were not practical at the time of war. Instead, preparations were made to deport any Lithuanian Germans, their families, and more distant relatives. The train with 1,000 people left Kaunas on 3 May and arrived at its destination only in June. The deportees provided free labor to cotton plantations in the valley of the Vakhsh River. Due to particularly poor living conditions, about 580 deportees died in the first two years.

After World War II ended, Mikhail Suslov, chairman of the Bureau for Lithuanian Affairs of the Central Committee of the Communist Party of the Soviet Union, approved a decision to deport 50–60 families from each county. Lavrentiy Beria approved the plan and sent Bogdan Kobulov and Arkady Apollonov to assist. The campaign targeted Lithuanian families of the "bandits" and was coordinated with a "legalization" offer to the partisans: if they surrendered, their families would be unharmed. However, such promises were not kept and lists of legalized partisans were used as basis for the deportee lists. Over 6,000 people were deported over the course of a month and a half. Most of those families had already their property confiscated, therefore official Soviet instructions that a family could take up to 1,500 kilograms (3,300 lb) of property were often useless. In addition to NKVD troops, destruction battalions were used for auxiliary duties.

From 1946 to early 1948, the civilian deportations were relatively small. The main method of oppression were individual arrests of "enemies of the people" and subsequent mass deportations of the prisoners. The deportations targeted Lithuanian partisans and their supported, but also included kulaks (Lithuanian: buožė) and bourgeoisie.

=== Operations Vesna and Priboi ===
Collectivization in Lithuania As of January
Year	Kolkhozy	Households	Progress	Wage (Note: Average payment of kilograms of grain for one workday.)
1948	20	300	0.08%	5.6
1949	614	15,200	3.9%	3.9
1950	6,032	229,300	60.5%	2.1
1951	4,471	326,100	89.1%	1.4
1952	2,938	342,600	94.1%	1.7
1953	2,628	359,600	98.8%	1.1

Two largest deportations were carried out in May 1948 (Operation Vesna, est. 40,000–50,000 deported from Lithuania) and in March 1949 (Operation Priboi, 28,656 deported from Lithuania). The deportations were ordered by the Council of Ministers of the Soviet Union. Operation Priboi was carried out simultaneously in the Lithuanian SSR, Latvian SSR, and Estonian SSR. Operation Vesna affected only Lithuania (possibly because resistance movement was the strongest in Lithuania). Officially, this new wave of political repression continued to target families and supporters of the resistance fighters. However, it was intended to break the resistance to collectivization, which required that peasants contribute their land, livestock, and farming equipment to a kolkhoz (collective farm). The farmer would then work for the collective farm and be paid a share of the farm's product and profit according to the number of workdays. Very few farmers joined the process voluntarily as it would mean abandoning private ownership for a system often compared to serfdom.

As people had witnessed previous deportations and knew the warning signs (e.g. the arrival of fresh troops and transport vehicles), many residents attempted to hide. In Lithuania, according to official Soviet records, some 13,700 avoided capture. Therefore, the authorities organized a follow-up deportation in April 1949. Some 3,000 people were found. They were labeled as especially dangerous, treated as prisoners, and sent to gold mines in Bodaybo.

=== Operation Osen and last deportations ===
It seemed that the 1947–1948 deportations achieved their goals: 1949 saw a flurry of collectivization and further weakening of the armed resistance. However, the pace of collectivization in Lithuania was still not as rapid as in Latvia or Estonia, where 93% and 80% of the farms were collectivized by the end of 1949. Therefore, an additional large-scale deportation took place in October 1951 (Operation Osen). It specifically targeted kulaks and those who did not join the collective farms.

== Life in exile ==
=== Living conditions ===
The living conditions varied greatly and depended on the geographic location of the forced settlement, local conditions, and type of work performed by the deportees. Even official reports acknowledged lack of suitable housing; for example, a report from Igarka described barracks with leaky roofs and without windows, beds, or bedding. Majority of the Lithuanian deportees were employed by the logging and timber industry. The deportees could not leave the location of their settlement or change work; their deportations had no expiration date and were for their lifetime. Those who attempted escape or "avoid work" were sent to prison camps. Between 1945 and 1948, 1722 Lithuanians attempted to escape; 1070 were caught by 1949. In 1948, stricter regulations adopted by the Supreme Soviet of the Soviet Union allotted 20 years in prison for those who escaped and 5 years for those aiding the fugitives. Children born in exile were classified as deportees and were subject to the same treatment as their parents, with some exceptions for mixed (deportee and non-deportee) families.

Due to poor living conditions, demanding physical labor, lack of food and medical care, the mortality rates were high, especially among the young and the elderly. Based on the incomplete and inaccurate records kept by MVD and MGB, Arvydas Anušauskas estimated that some 16,500 and 3,500 Lithuanians died in 1945–1952 and 1953–1958 respectively; this number does not include 8,000 deaths among the deportees of 1941. Thus total Lithuanian deaths could be around 28,000. Children accounted for about a quarter of the total casualties.

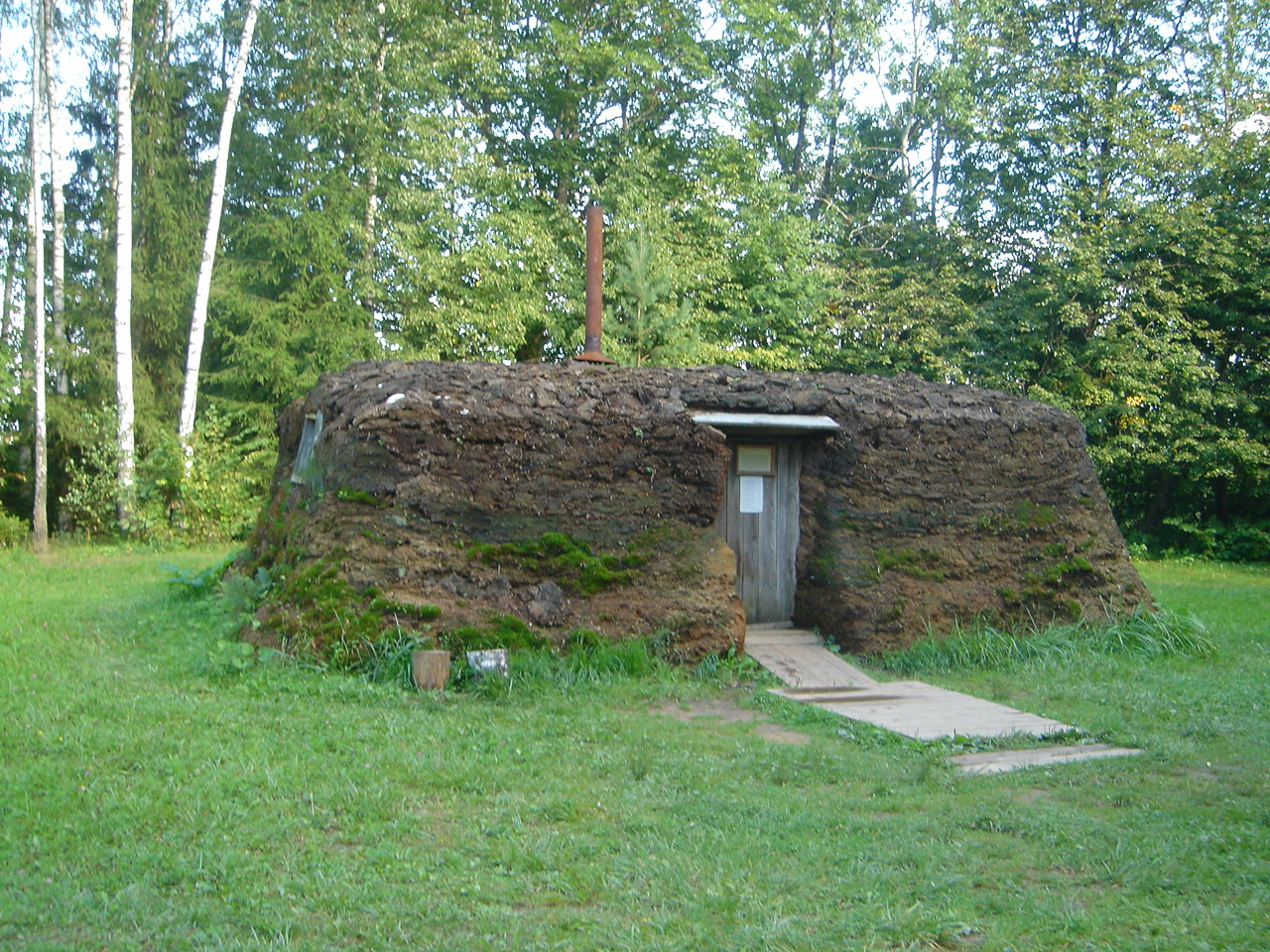
Example of deportee dwelling in arctic regions of Siberia.

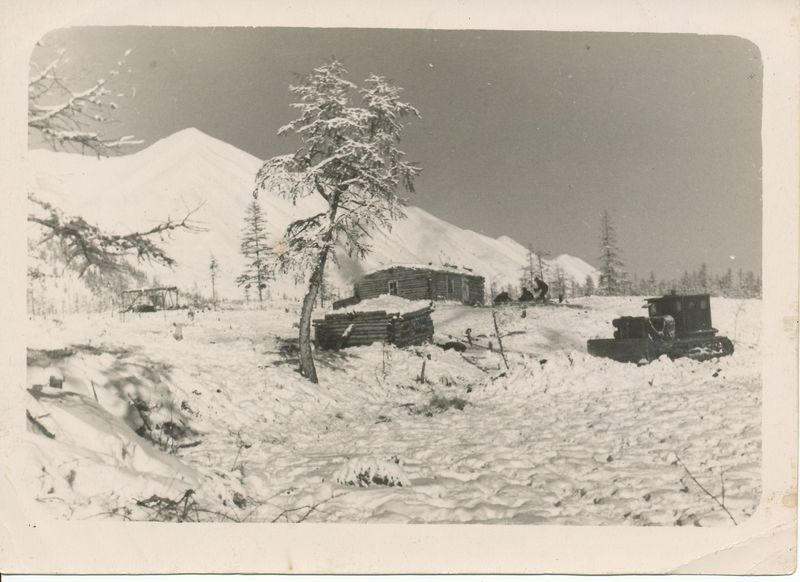
Lithuanian deportee house in Kolyma (1958).

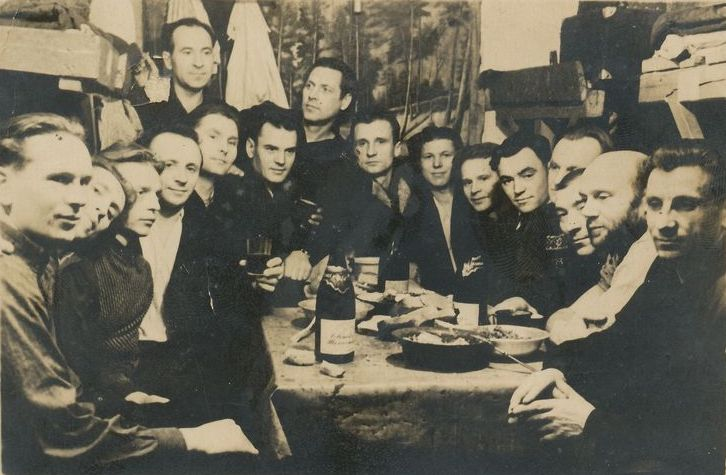
Lithuanian deportees celebrate Christmas in 1957.

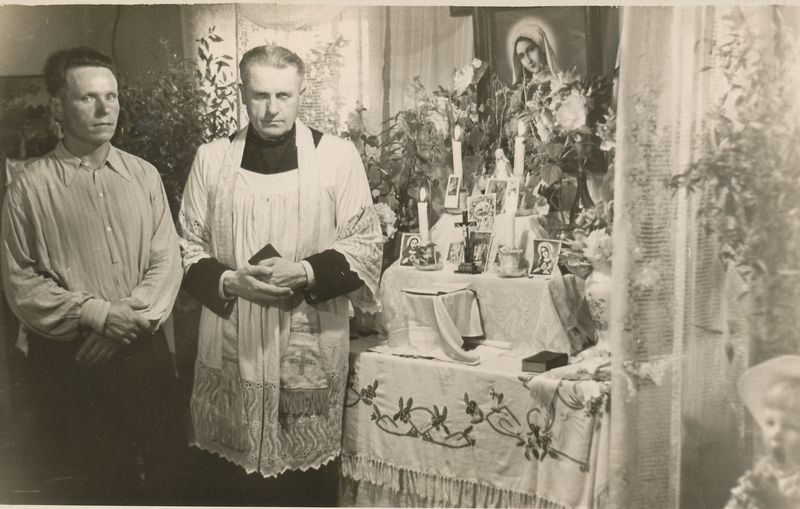
Home altar of Justinas Zaksas.

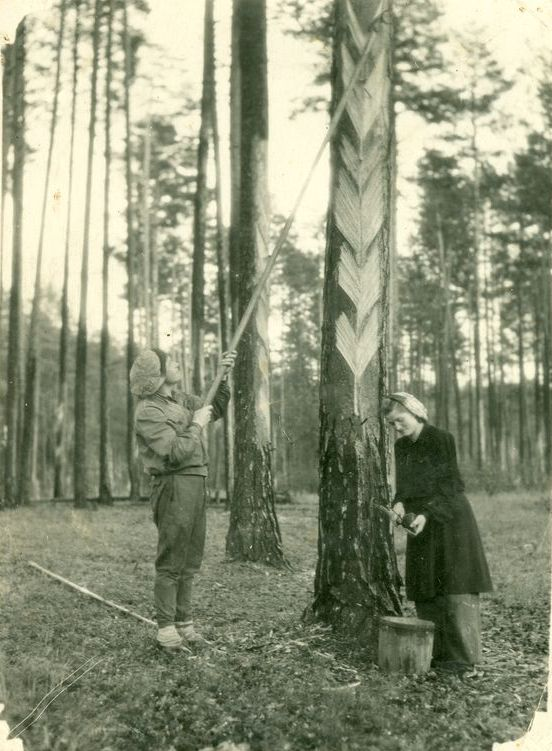
Lithuanian deportees extract resin near Irkutsk (1956).

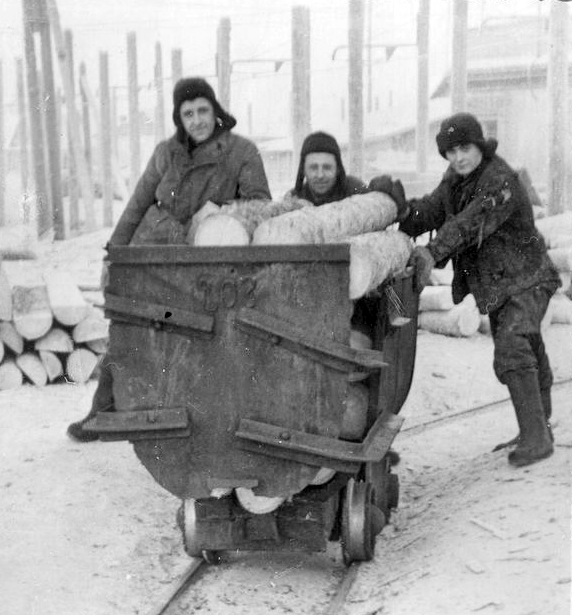
Lithuanian deportees in Inta push a cart of logs into the mine (1956).

=== Release and return ===
Remaining Lithuanian deportees Number of adults as of 1 Jan.
Year	Deported in 1944–1952	Deported in 1941
1955	75,185	?
1956	72,777	4,682
1957	59,663	3,127
1958	35,741	1,878
1959	4,907	279

Stalin's death in 1953 was followed by the Khrushchev Thaw and a de-Stalinization campaign, which included a gradual release of the deportees and prisoners. In July 1954, deportee children under 16 were removed from the deportee list and the sentence for escape was reduced from 20 to 3 years in prison. The release of the Lithuanians was slow. When in 1954 an amnesty was announced for people older than 55–60, disabled, or incurably ill, a special provision excluded the Lithuanians or members of the Organization of Ukrainian Nationalists due to matters of "public security". In Lithuania, the deportee files were slowly reviewed on a case-by-case basis by the Supreme Soviet of the Lithuanian SSR. Soviet apparatchiks regarded the deportees as a threat, especially when they wanted to claim their property confiscated at the time of the deportation. The Lithuanians approved releases only in limited circumstances if they found some irregularities or violations.

In 1956 and 1957, the Supreme Soviet of the Soviet Union approved releases of larger groups of the deportees, including the Lithuanians. Deportees started returning in large numbers creating difficulties for local communists – deportees would petition for return of their confiscated property, were generally considered unreliable and required special surveillance. Soviet Lithuanian officials, including Antanas Sniečkus, drafted local administrative measures prohibiting deportee return and petitioned Moscow to enact national policies to that effect. In May 1958, the Soviet Union revised its policy regarding the remaining deportees: all those who were not involved with the Lithuanian partisans were released, but without the right to return to Lithuania. The last Lithuanians—the partisan relatives and the partisans—were released only in 1960 and 1963 respectively. Majority of the deportees released in May 1958 and later never returned to Lithuania.

About 60,000 deportees returned to Lithuania. However, they faced further difficulties: their property was long looted and divided up by strangers, they faced discrimination for jobs and social guarantees, their children were denied higher education. Former deportees, resistance members, and their children were not allowed to integrate into the society. That created a permanent group of people that opposed the regime and continued non-violent resistance.

== Impact and evaluations ==
Deportations of civilian population without warning, trial, or apparent cause were one of the most serious grievances against the Soviet regime. When, during Gorbachev-introduced glastnost, Lithuanians were allowed a greater freedom of speech, honoring the memory of the deportees was one of their first demands. Such demands were raised during the first public anti-Soviet rally organized by the Lithuanian Liberty League on 23 August 1987.

Some Lithuanians believe that the deportees should be paid a compensation for their slave labor in a similar fashion as Germany paid compensation to forced laborers in Nazi Germany.

== Summary table ==
Summary of mass deportations carried out in the Lithuanian SSR
Year	Date	Number of people (Note: The number is presented according to official MVD and MGB reports immediately after the deportation. Subsequent reports lowered the number of the deportees. The actual number was higher as Soviet officials had little incentive to prepare accurate statistical reports.)	Destination
1941	14–19 June (June deportation)	17,485	Altai Krai, Komi ASSR, Tomsk Oblast
1945	20 April – 3 May (Lithuanian Germans)	1,048	Tajikistan SSR (region of Stalinabad)
1945	17 July – 3 September	6,320	Komi ASSR, Sverdlovsk Oblast, Molotov Oblast
1946	18–21 February	2,082	Sverdlovsk Oblast
1947	December	2,782	Tomsk Oblast, Tyumen Oblast, Komi ASSR
1948	January–February	1,156	Tomsk Oblast, Krasnoyarsk Krai
1948	22–27 May (Operation Vesna)	40,002	Krasnoyarsk Krai, Irkutsk Oblast, Buryat–Mongol ASSR
1949	25–28 March (Operation Priboi)	29,180	Irkutsk Oblast, Krasnoyarsk Krai
1949	10–20 April	3,090	Irkutsk Oblast
1949	6 June	500 (approx)	Irkutsk Oblast
1949	7 July	279	Irkutsk Oblast
1950	14 April, 1–2 September, 20 September	1,355	Altai Krai, Khabarovsk Krai
1951	31 March – 1 April (Operation North)	433	Irkutsk Oblast, Tomsk Oblast
1951	20–21 September	3,087	Irkutsk Oblast
1951	2–3 October (Operation Osen)	16,150	Krasnoyarsk Krai
1951	3 October	335	Krasnoyarsk Krai
1951	30 November	452	Altai Krai
1952	23 January	2,195	Krasnoyarsk Krai
1952	6–7 July	465	Unknown
1952	5–6 August	359	Krasnoyarsk Krai
Total		129,475	

== See also ==
- Soviet deportations from Estonia
- Soviet deportations from Latvia
- Between Shades of Gray – best-selling novel about a deported Lithuanian family
- Birch bark letters from Siberia

== Bibliography ==
- Anušauskas, Arvydas (1996). Lietuvių tautos sovietinis naikinimas 1940–1958 metais (PDF) (in Lithuanian). Vilnius: Mintis. ISBN 5-417-00713-7. Archived from the original (PDF) on 21 April 2014.
- Anušauskas, Arvydas (2002). Deportations of the population in 1944–1953 (PDF). The International Commission for the Evaluation of the Crimes of the Nazi and Soviet Occupation Regimes in Lithuania. Archived from the original (PDF) on 22 July 2011.
- Anušauskas, Arvydas; et al., eds. (2005). Lietuva, 1940–1990 (in Lithuanian). Vilnius: Lietuvos gyventojų genocido ir rezistencijos tyrimo centras. ISBN 9986-757-65-7.
- Bugaĭ, Nikolaĭ Fedorovich (1996). The Deportation of Peoples in the Soviet Union. Nova Publishers. ISBN 9781560723714.
- Fitzpatrick, Sheila (1996). Stalin's peasants: resistance and survival in the Russian village after collectivization. Oxford University Press. ISBN 9780195104592.
- Kasparas, Kęstutis (1998). "Okupantų veiksmai siekiant demoralizuoti ir dezorganizuoti pasipriešinimą 1945 m. vasarą". Genocidas Ir Resistencija (in Lithuanian). 3. ISSN 1392-3463.
- Misiunas, Romuald; Taagepera, Rein (1993). The Baltic States: Years of Dependence 1940–1990 (revised ed.). University of California Press. ISBN 0-520-08228-1.
- Pohl, J. Otto (1999). Ethnic cleansing in the USSR, 1937-1949. Contributions to the study of world history. Greenwood Publishing Group. ISBN 9780313309212.
- Tininis, Vytautas (2003). The Crimes of the Communist Regime in Lithuania 1944–1953 (PDF). Vol. 2. General Jonas Žemaitis Military Academy of Lithuania. ISBN 9955-423-18-8. Archived from the original (PDF) on 21 April 2014.
- Vardys, Vytas Stanley; Sedaitis, Judith B. (1997). Lithuania: The Rebel Nation. Westview Series on the Post-Soviet Republics. WestviewPress. ISBN 0-8133-1839-4.
- Stravinskienė, Vitalija (2012). "Lietuvos lenkų trėmimai: 1941–1952 m." Istorija. Mokslo darbai (in Lithuanian). 87. ISSN 2029-7181.
