= Visaginas =

- City
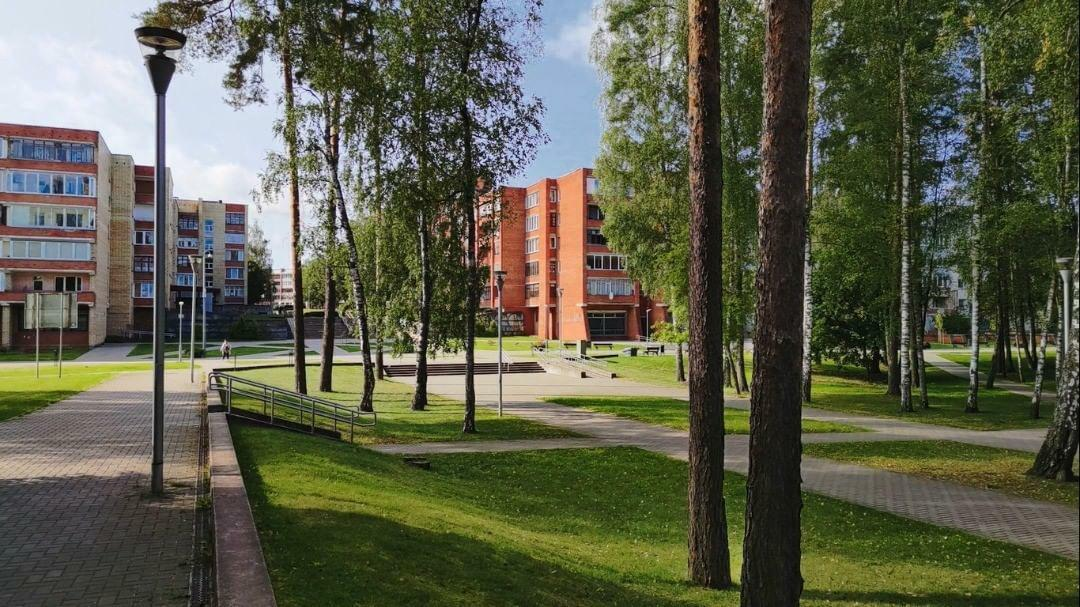
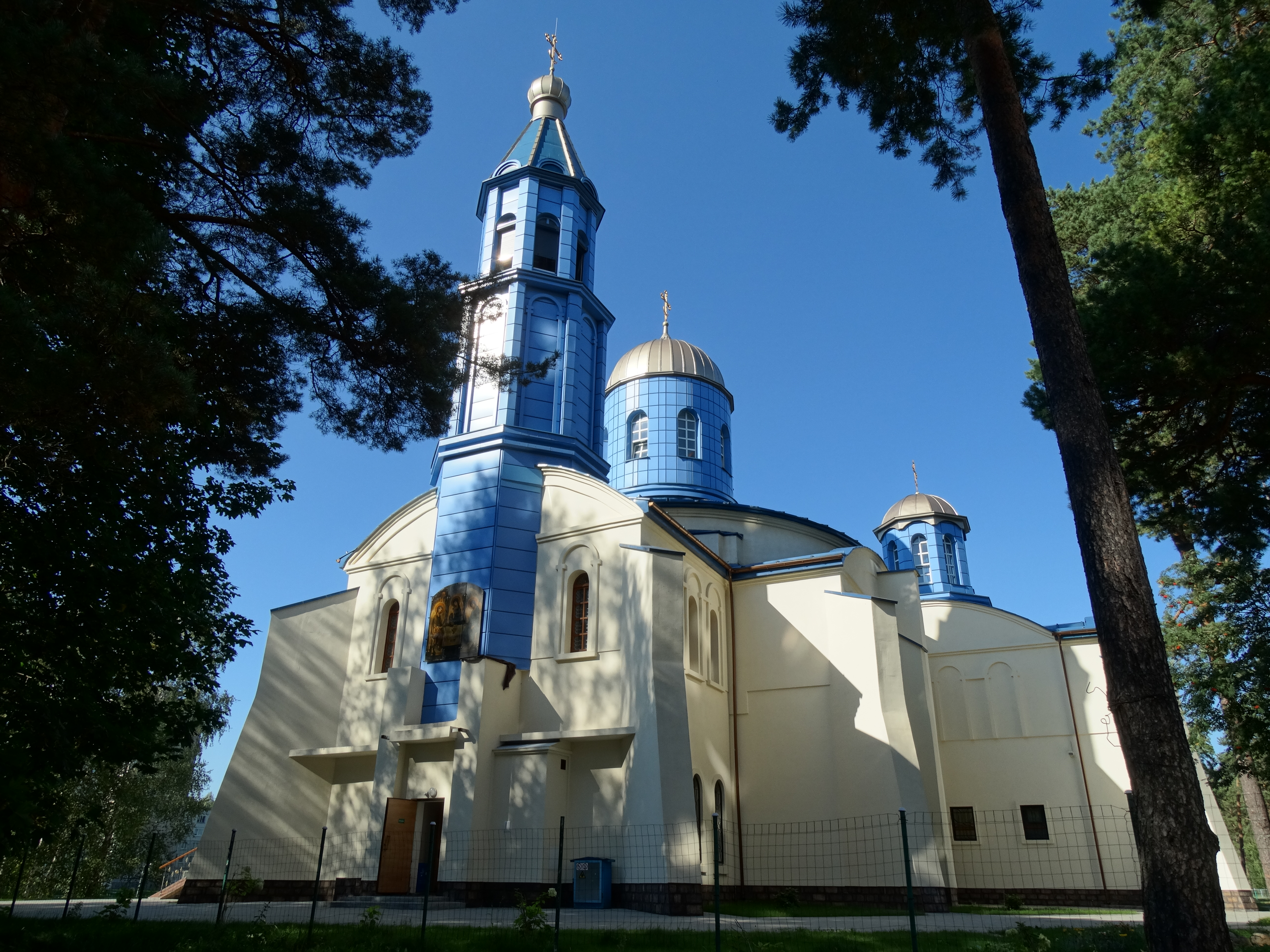
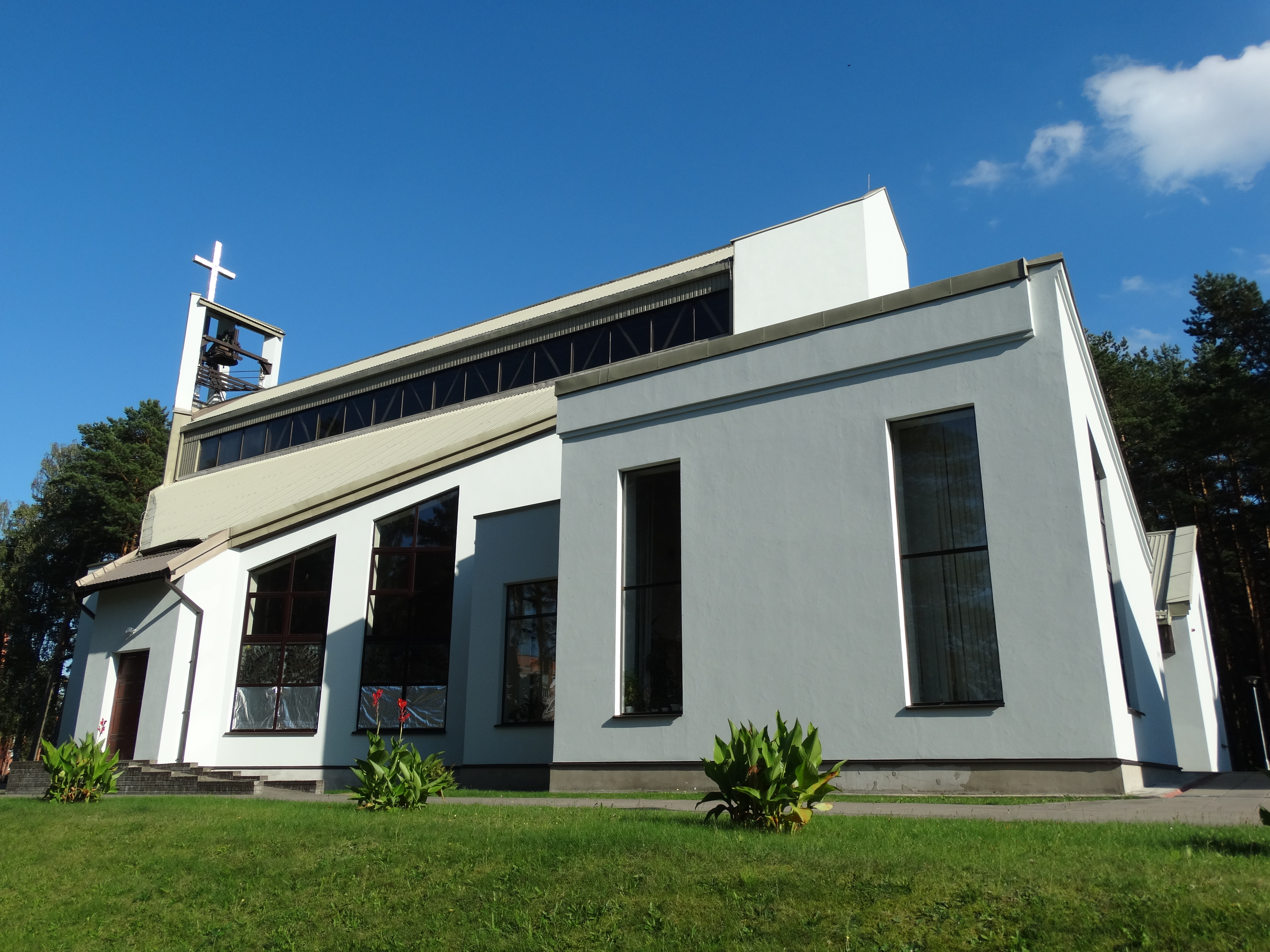
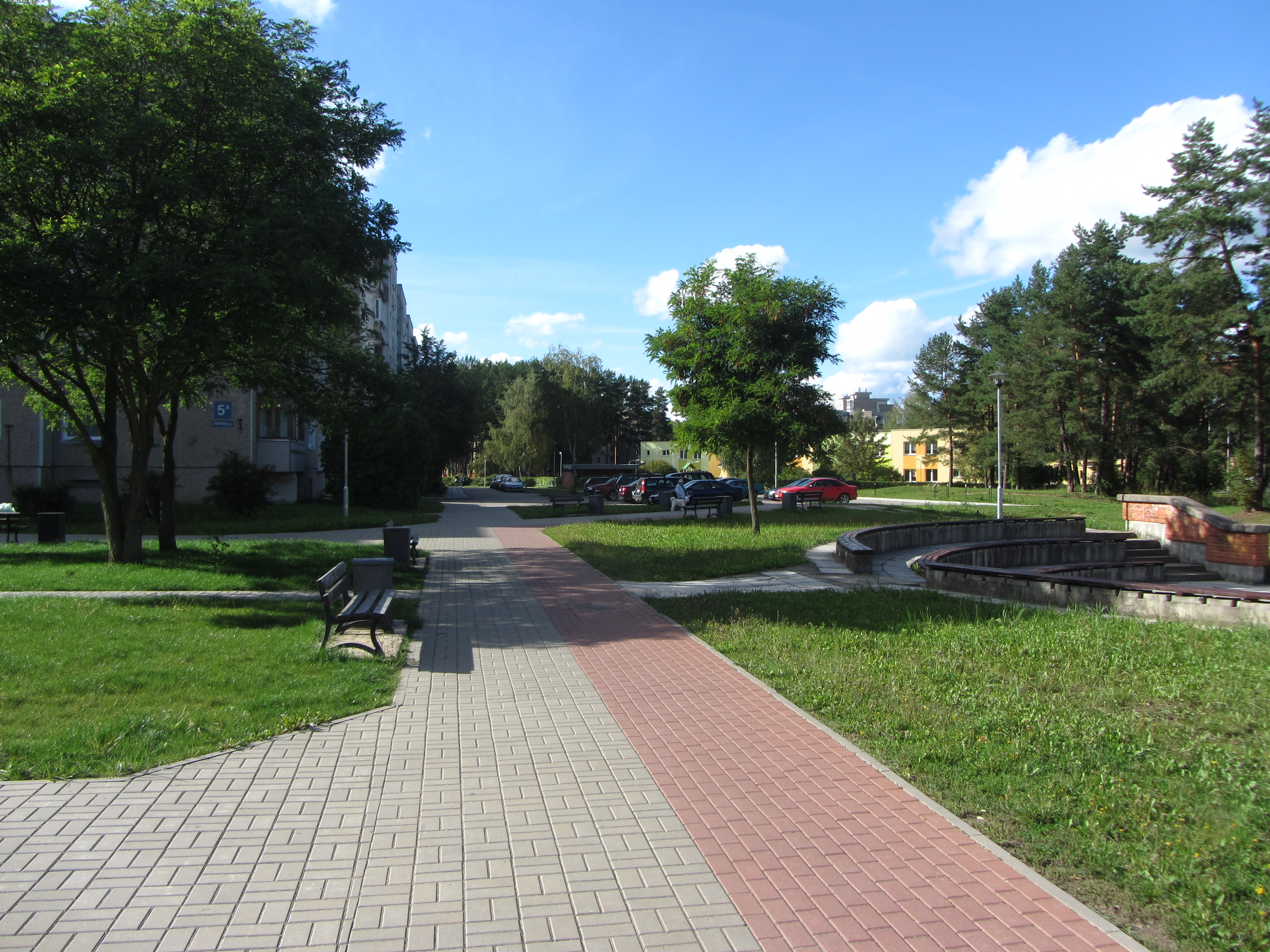
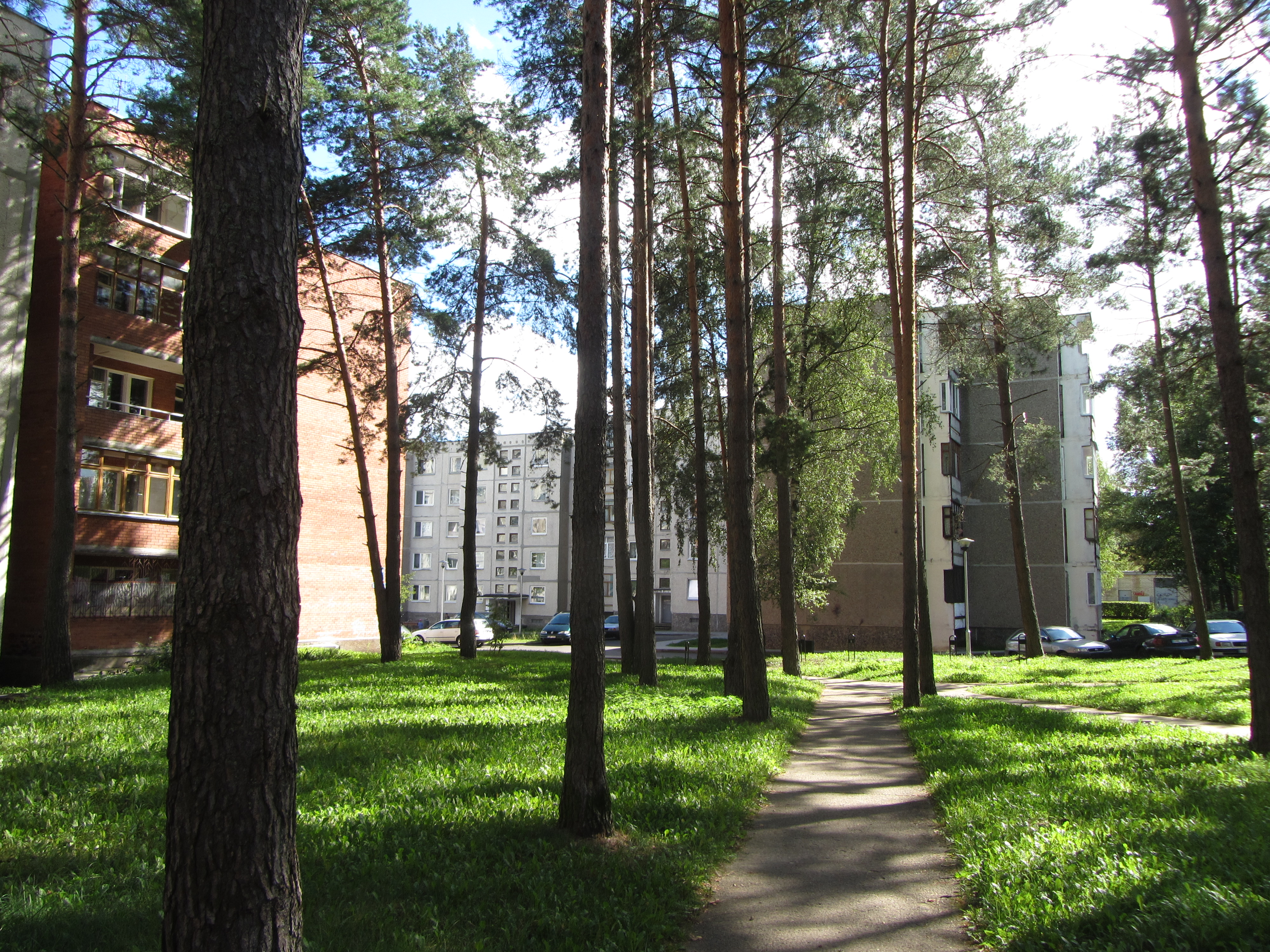

- Flag Coat of arms
- Map of Visaginas Municipality
- Location of Visaginas Visaginas (Europe)
- Coordinates: 55.598°N 26.438°E
- Country: Lithuania
- Ethnographic region: Aukštaitija
- County: Utena County
- Municipality: Visaginas municipality
- Capital of: Visaginas municipality
- Established: 1975
- Granted city rights: 1995

Area
  - Total: 13.8 km^{2} (5.3 sq mi)
- Elevation: 164 m (538 ft)

Population (2020-01-21)
  - Total: 18,024
  - Density: 1,310/km^{2} (3,380/sq mi)
- Demonym(s): Visaginian/Visaginians (English) visaginietis/visaginiečiai (Lithuanian)
- Time zone: UTC+2 (EET)
  - Summer (DST): UTC+3 (EEST)
- Website: visaginas.lt

Visaginas is a city in northeastern Lithuania. It is the centre of Lithuania's youngest municipality, located on the north-eastern edge of the country. It was built as a town for workers engaged in the construction of the now decommissioned Ignalina Nuclear Power Plant. Visaginas is the only city in Lithuania where the majority of the population speaks Russian as their first language. Originally the aerial view of Visaginas was designed to resemble a butterfly. However, after work on the nuclear power plant was cancelled, so was further construction of the town. Currently Visaginas consists of three residential regions that locals refer to as the 1st, 2nd and 3rd Microdistricts. Visaginas has 14 streets. The city grew up in a pine forest by Lake Visaginas. Tourism is currently an area of great potential, as is the possibility of a new nuclear power plant.

The administrative centre of Visaginas municipality is situated near the country's biggest lake, Drūkšiai(This lake crosses the international border). Its administrative boundaries are in the process of being defined. The Vilnius–Daugavpils (Latvia) railway runs alongside the city, providing convenient communication with those cities.

== History ==
Memorial stone in the city centre with a commemorative plaque from August 1975.

Before World War II, from 1922 to 1939, the area of modern Visaginas lay within the boundaries of the Gmina Smołwy in the Brasław County of the Wilno Voivodeship in Poland.

In 1975 on the shores of Lake Visaginas a satellite settlement was founded for workers of the Ignalina Nuclear Power Plant, in place of four villages that were demolished, the largest of which was named Visaginas. The new settlement was named Sniečkus after Antanas Sniečkus, a former first secretary of the Lithuanian Communist Party. In 1977 it was granted the status of urban-type settlement. Following the restoration of independence, the settlement was renamed to Visaginas in 1992 and received municipal rights in 1995. It is governed by a city council, which elects the mayor. In 1996, the city's coat of arms was confirmed by a decree of the President of Lithuania.

The settlement was developed in complexes, with construction designed to create an infrastructure for the cultural and everyday life of the residents. Efforts were made to preserve the natural surroundings as much as possible.

== Population ==
In 1996, the population was 33,100, of which 55.68% were Russians, 15.88% Lithuanians, 10.29% Belarusians, 9.13% Poles, 5.69% Ukrainians and 0.95% Tatars. Orthodox Christians made up 40.42% of the total population, Roman Catholics 27.29%, the Non-affiliated 27.29%, Old Believers 2.89% and Muslims 0.46%. In 2001, the population was 52.43% Russian, 14.96% Lithuanian and 32.61% other. In 2011, the population was 22,361. Russians accounted for 52.16% (11,664) of the inhabitants, Lithuanians – 18.27% (4,086), Belarusians – 9.89% (2,211), Poles – 9.32% (2,084), and Ukrainians – 5.16% (1,154). In 2021, the population was 19,633. Russians accounted for 47.36% (9,299) of the inhabitants, Lithuanians – 20.13% (3,953), Belarusians – 9.60% (1,884), Poles – 10.23% (2,009), and Ukrainians – 5.23% (1,027).

Historical population

| Year | Pop. | ±% p.a. |
|---|---|---|
| 1931 | 30 | — |
| 1979 | 6,212 | +11.75% |
| 1989 | 32,438 | +17.97% |

| Year | Pop. | ±% p.a. |
|---|---|---|
| 2001 | 29,554 | −0.77% |
| 2011 | 22,361 | −2.75% |
| 2021 | 19,446 | −1.39% |

Source: 1902, 1923, 1959 & 1970, 1979, 1989, 2001, 2011

== Industry ==
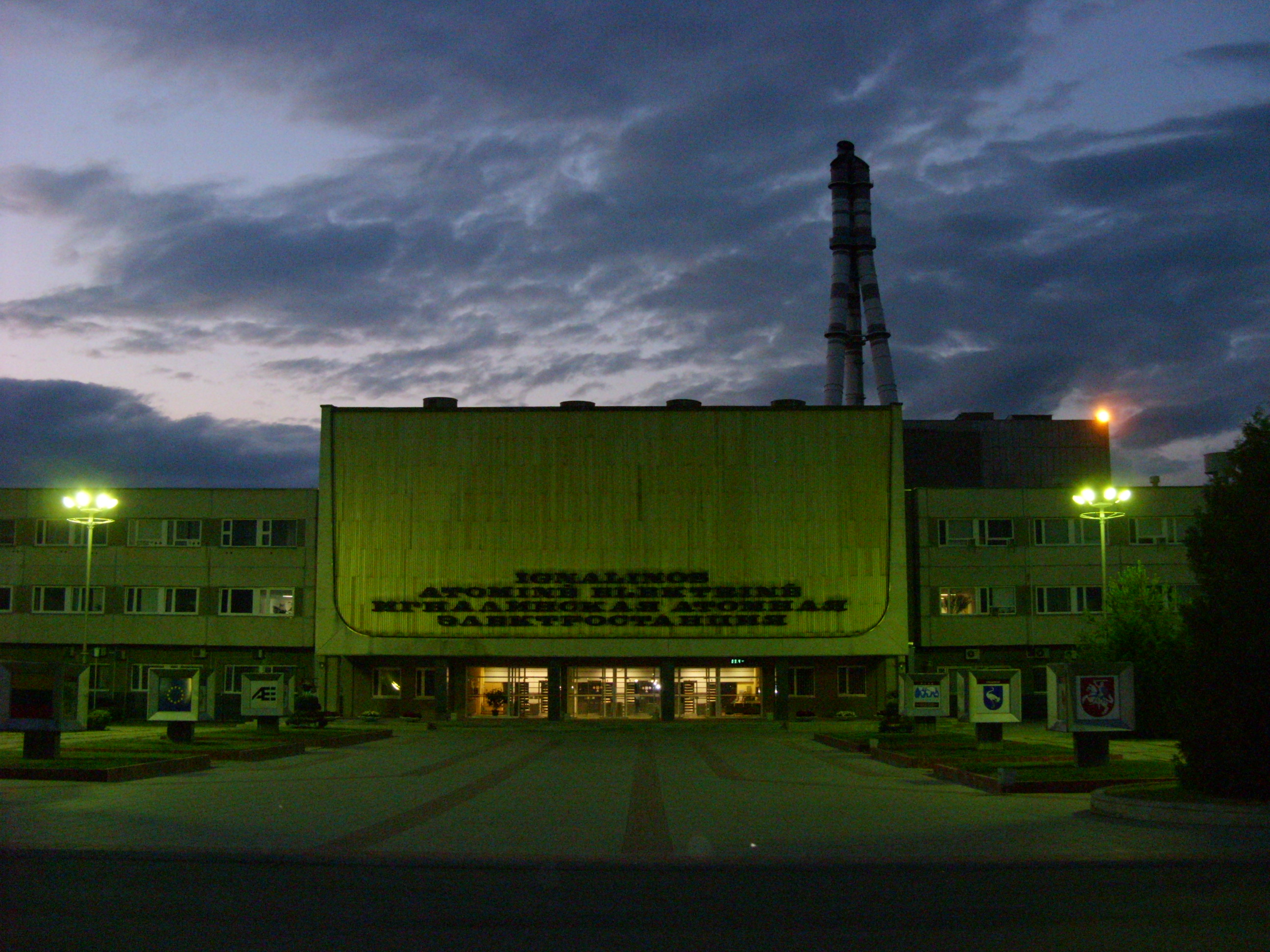
Ignalina Nuclear Power Plant

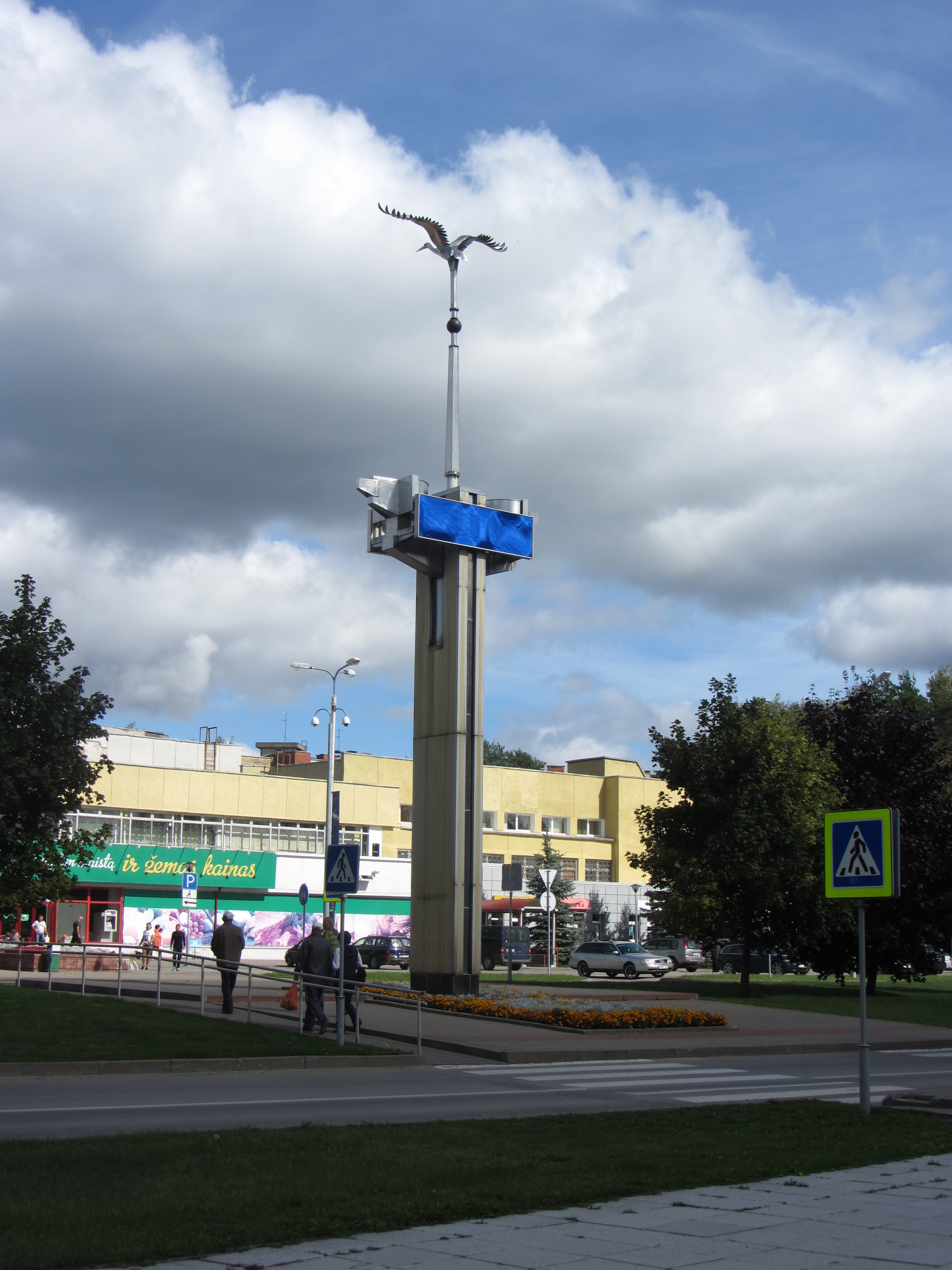
Column with a sculpture and a Geiger counter

Power was the main branch of industry: the country's only nuclear power plant, one of the world's most powerful, is situated near Visaginas. It ceased operations in December 2009 over safety concerns and is currently being decommissioned. Over 5,000 people were employed in the plant. There are opportunities to developing the construction industry in order to utilize the existing industrial potential (concrete, ferroconcrete, and wood), and also the electronics industry, polish and paint, and clothing. There are over 1,500 companies in the city active in light industry, trade and services.

== Transportation ==
Visaginas railway station in 2006

Visaginas is served by Visaginas railway station, situated to the northwest of the centre of the city in the village of Pasmalvės. The station is located on the Vilnius–Daugavpils railway line, providing convenient communication with those cities.

== Education, culture, and sports ==
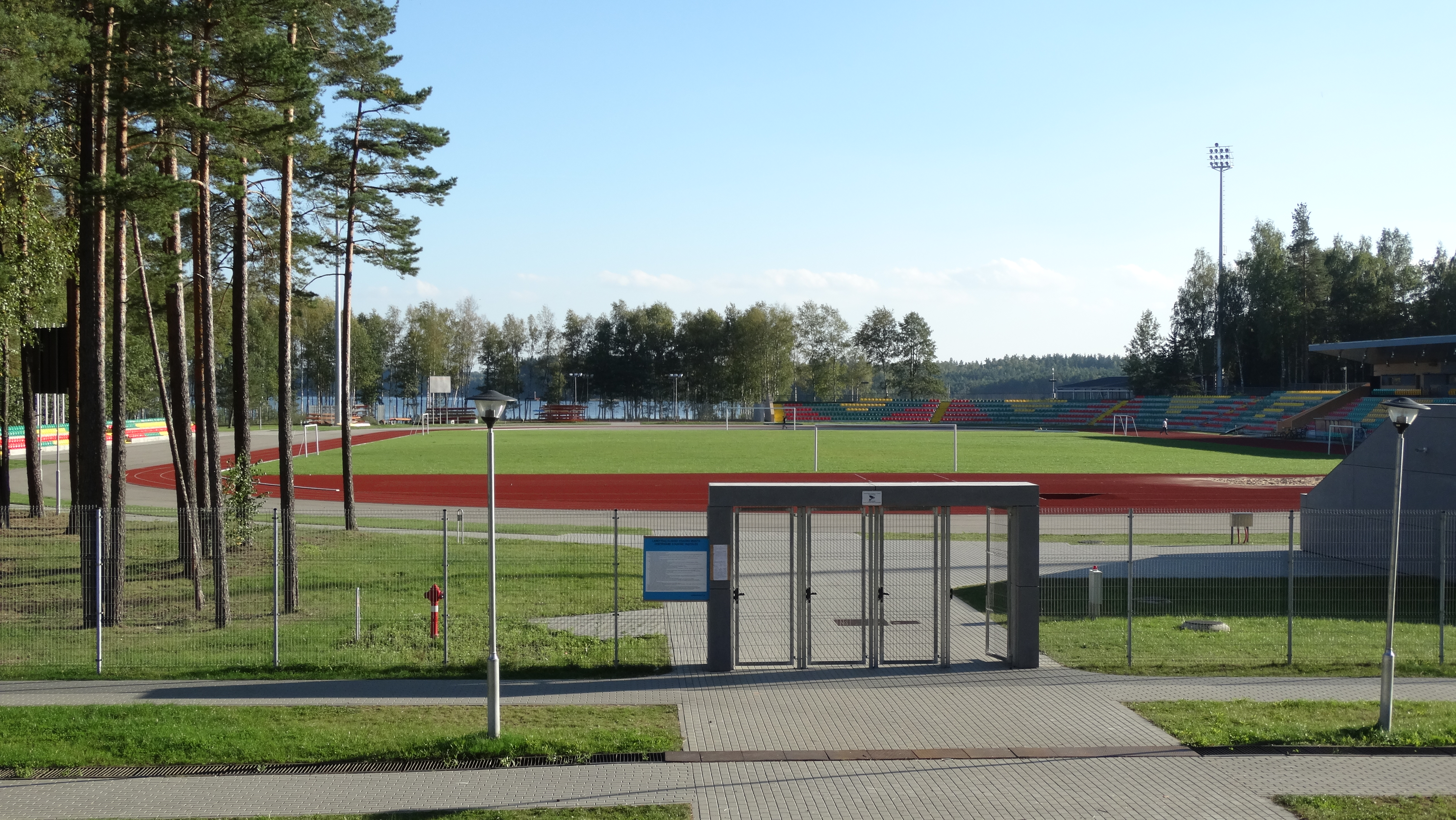
Central Stadium

The city has a polytechnic school, six secondary schools, an elementary school, eight nursery schools, music and acrobatics colleges, a sports centre and other institutions engaged in organizing educational and leisure activities, including 11 sports clubs with more than 1,600 members. Professional training is available in soccer, Greco-Roman wrestling, and skiing. An annual country music festival "Visaginas Country" is held in the city .

== Twin city – sister cities ==
Visaginas is twinned with:

- Dagda, Latvia
- Daugavpils, Latvia
- Lidzbark Warmiński, Poland
- Slavutych, Ukraine
- Zambrów, Poland
