= June deportation =

1941 deportation of people from Soviet-occupied territories

The June deportation of 1941 (Estonian: juuniküüditamine, Latvian: jūnija deportācijas, Lithuanian: birželio trėmimai) was a mass deportation of tens of thousands of people during World War II from Estonia, Latvia, Lithuania, present-day western Belarus and western Ukraine, and present-day Moldova – territories which had been occupied by the Soviet Union in 1939–1940 – into the interior of the Soviet Union.

The June deportation was ordered by the Soviet dictator Stalin, and organized following formal guidelines set by the NKVD with the Soviet Interior People's Commissar Lavrentiy Beria as the senior executor. The official title of the top secret document was “Resolution On the Eviction of the Socially Foreign Elements from the Baltic Republics, Western Ukraine, Western Belarus and Moldova”. The NKVD and Red Army units carried out the arrests, often in collaboration with the Soviet police and local Communist Party members.

== Background ==
The June deportations were part of a much larger history of depopulation. The "Stalin deportations" from 1928-1953 targeted 13 different nationalities. The June Deportation marked the first industrialized deportations, using rail.

Estonia, Latvia, and Lithuania were invaded and occupied, and thereafter annexed, by the Soviet Union in June 1940, less than a year after Poland and the Baltic countries had been divided into "spheres of influence" between the Soviet Union and Nazi Germany in the 23 August 1939 Molotov–Ribbentrop Pact. In June 1940, the three independent Baltic countries were occupied by the Soviet Red army and new pro-Soviet puppet governments were installed. Mass deportation campaigns began almost immediately and included Estonia, Latvia, Lithuania, Ukraine, Belarus, and Moldova.

== Deportations ==
Planning for mass deportations began as far back as 1939. The deportation took place from 22 May to 20 June 1941, just before the invasion of the Soviet Union by Nazi Germany. The operations began 22 May in Ukraine and Poland, 12-13 June in Moldova, 14 June in Latvia, Estonia, and Lithuania, and 19-20 June in Belarus.

The goal of the deportations was to remove political opponents of the Soviet government, not to strengthen security in preparation for the German attack. The NKVD framed the deportees as anti-Soviet, counter-revolutionaries, and criminal elements. The fourth wave of mass deportations in occupied Poland and deportations in Ukraine were both intended to combat the "counter-revolutionary" Organization of Ukrainian Nationalists. The deportation program served three Soviet goals: to remove dissidents, to change composition of population through Russian migration, and to have cheap slave labor in Gulag camps.

The June deportation campaigns resulted in genocidal levels of depopulation. The goal of depopulation was often reflected by NKVD officials carrying out deportations. For example, in Lithuania, the Lutherans, wealthy, academics, and Nationalists were targeted. Lithuanian affairs commissioner Mikhail Suslov declared "There will be Lithuania – but without Lithuanians."

The procedure for the deportations was approved by Ivan Serov in the Serov Instructions. People were deported without trials in whole families, which were then split. Men were generally imprisoned and most of them died in Siberia in Gulag camps. Women and children were resettled in forced settlements in Omsk and Novosibirsk Oblasts, Krasnoyarsk, Tajikistan, Altai Krais, and Kazakhstan. Thousands of people were stuffed into cattle cars, usually 30–40 under unsanitary conditions, leading to casualties, especially among the elderly and children. Due to poor living conditions at the destination, the mortality rate was very high. For example, the mortality rate among the Estonian deportees was estimated at 60%.

Following Stalin's death in 1953, Khrushchev began a program of limited return. In Lithuania, for example, 17,000 people returned by 1956 and 80,000 returned by 1970. Many people deemed nationalist or of non-white ethnic descent were not allowed to return until the 1980s. When survivors did return, they faced discrimination and loss of property.

== Number of deportees ==
The number of deported people include:

Pre-war country	Number of deportees		
Pre-war country	To forced settlements (from official NKVD reports)	To prison camps and forced settlements	Overstated estimates
Estonia	5,978	10,000 to 11,000	
Latvia	9,546	15,000	
Lithuania	10,187	17,500	
Poland	11,329 (Western Ukraine); 22,353 (Western Belarus)	24,412 (Western Belarus)	200,000 to 300,000
Romania^{a}	24,360		300,000
^{a} Moldavia as well as Chernivtsi Oblast and Izmail Oblast of Ukraine

== Remembrance ==
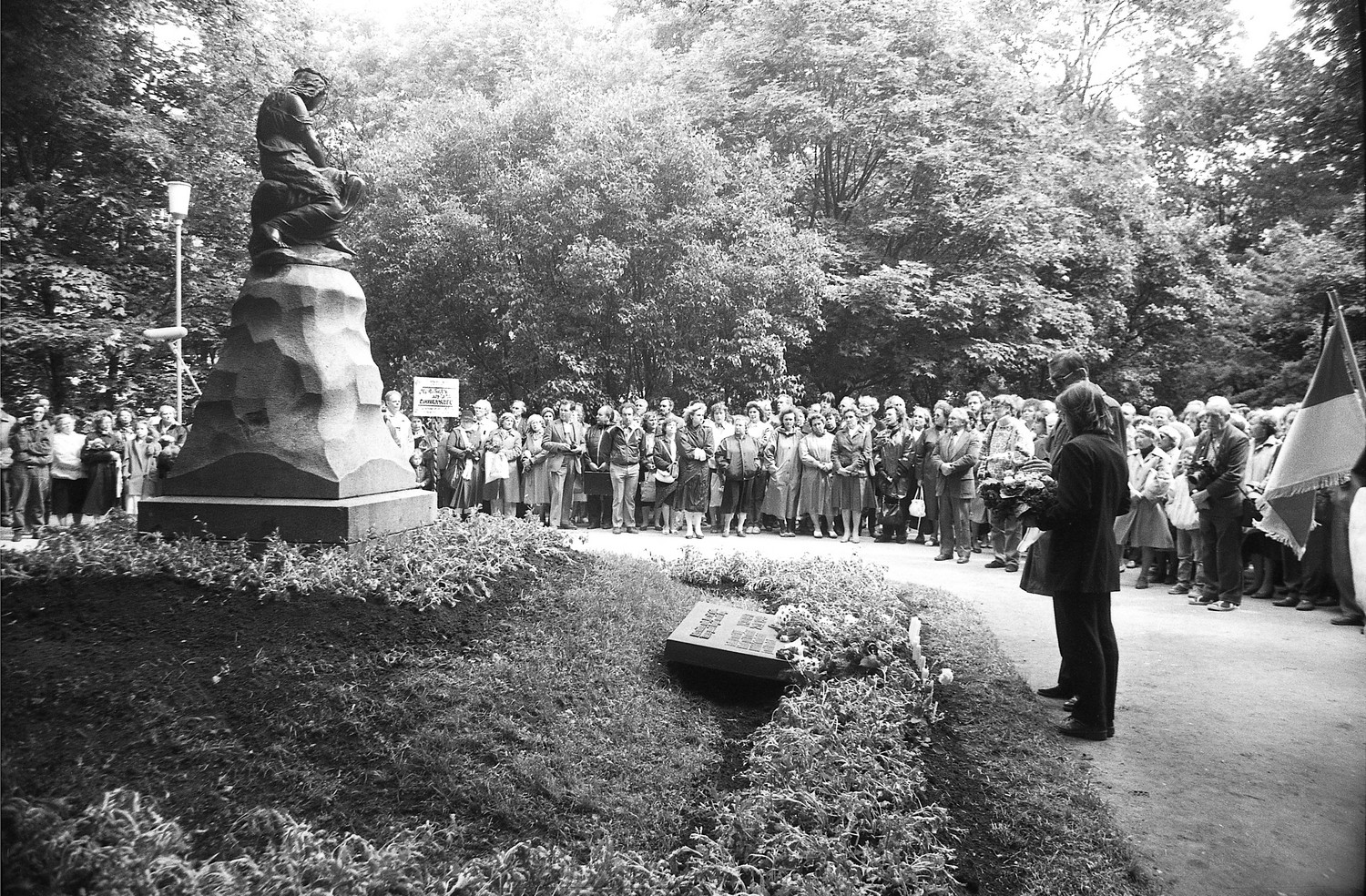
Memorial event in Tallinn in 1989

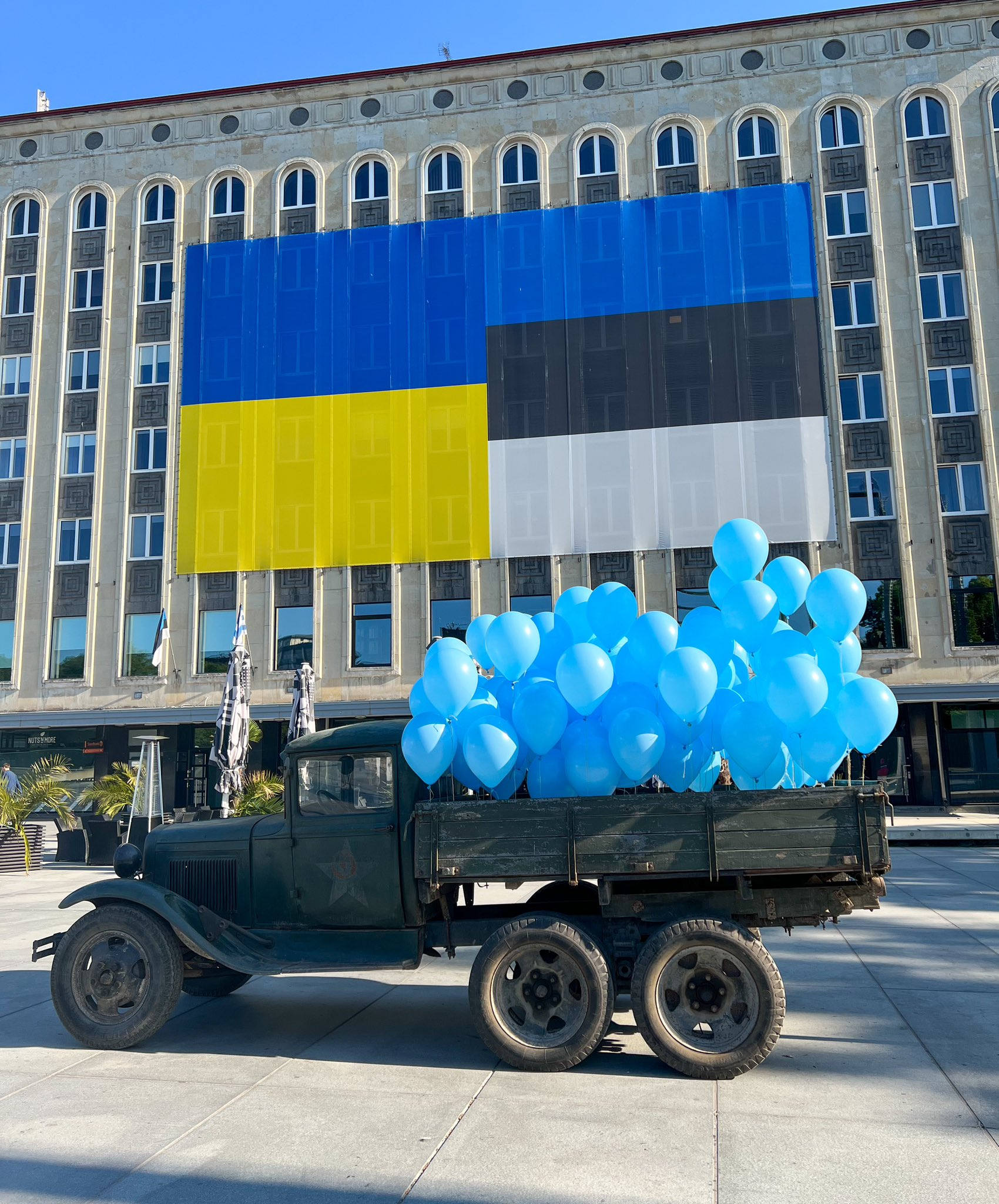
2023 June Deportation Remembrance Day in Estonia

Baltic States hold a day of remembrance on 14 June. In Latvia, this is the Commemoration Day for the Victims of Communist Genocide.

The Day of Remembrance began following the National Awakening movement in the 1980s. On 14 June 1987, the human rights group Helsinki-86 organized a flower laying ceremony at the Freedom Monument to commemorate the victims of the 1941 deportations. In 1993, the Museum of the Occupation of Latvia (LOM) was founded, which organized efforts around Remembrance Days. In Estonia, the Estonian Institute of Historical Memory leads vigils on 14 June and 25 March.

== In media ==
The June deportation has been the subject of several Baltic films from the 2010s. The 2013 Lithuanian film The Excursionist dramatised the events through the depiction of a 10-year-old girl who escapes from her camp. Estonia's 2014 In the Crosswind is an essay film based on the memoirs of a woman who was deported to Siberia, and is told through staged tableaux vivants filmed in black-and-white. Estonia's Ülo Pikkov also addressed the events in the animated short film Body Memory (Kehamälu) from 2012. Latvia's The Chronicles of Melanie was released in 2016 and is, just like In the Crosswind, based on the memoirs of a woman who experienced the deportation, but is told in a more conventional dramatic way.

A number of historical fiction and non-fictional books also explore the 1941 deportations and their impact. Urve Tamberg's work of historical fiction, the young adult novel The Darkest Corner of the World (2012), is a composite of her family's and her community's stories told through the eyes of a young woman in Estonia who flees from Tallinn to the island of Hiiumaa to try to escape the deportations. Additionally, Ann Lehtmets co-authored the memoir Sentence: Siberia (1994) with Douglas Hoile, a first hand account of her survival in the Gulags following the 1941 deportations. Other notable works include Ruta Sepetys' novel Between Shades of Gray (2011), which follows a Lithuanian family's experience of the 1941 deportations, which was adapted into the film Ashes in the Snow.

== See also ==
- Soviet deportations from Estonia
- Soviet deportations from Latvia
- Soviet deportations from Lithuania
- Commemoration Day for the Victims of Communist Genocide
- Birch bark letters from Siberia
- Occupation of Estonia by Nazi Germany
