= Visaginas (lake) =

Lake in Lithuania

Lake Visaginas
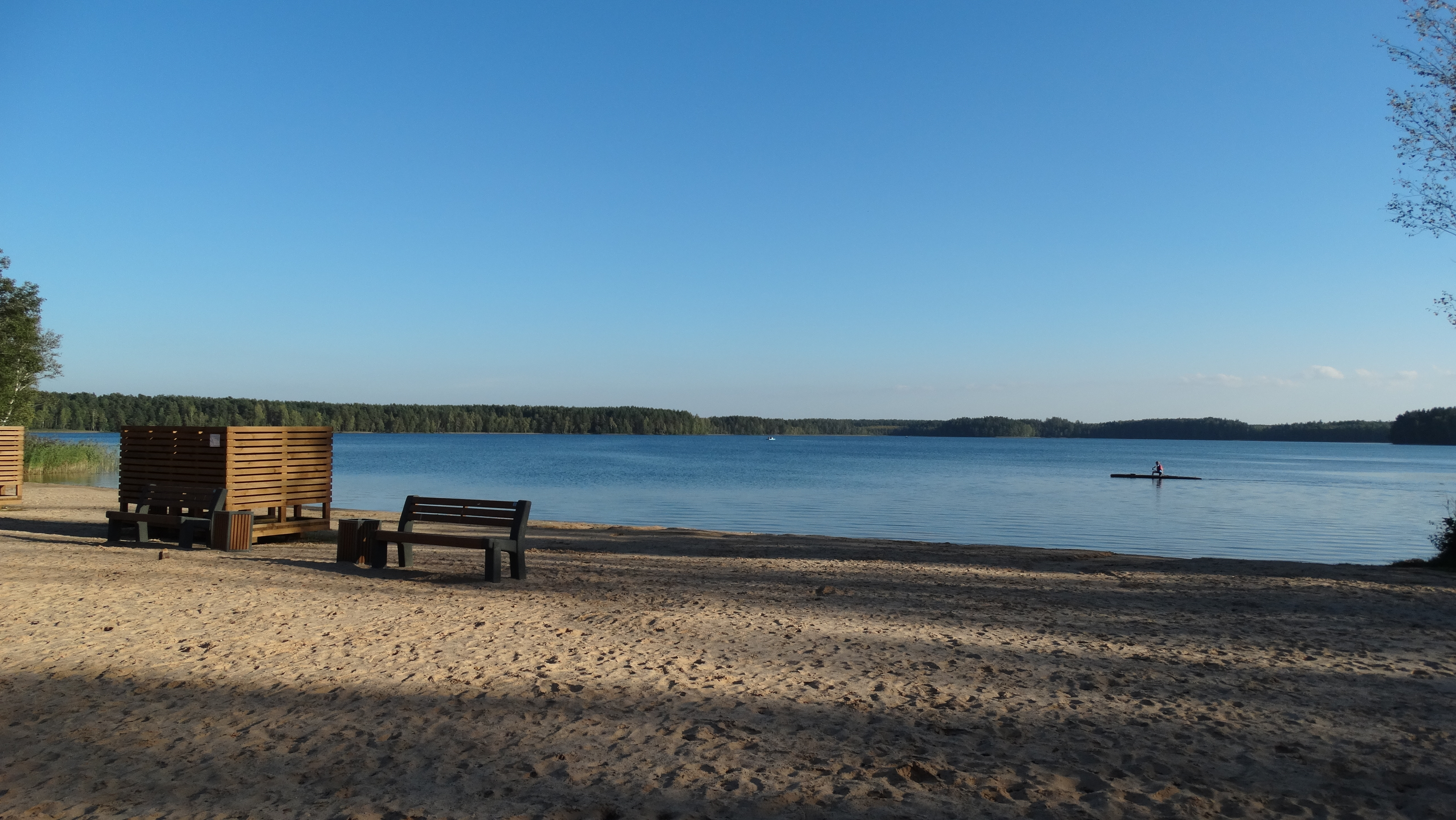

- Location within Lithuania
- Location: Visaginas, Lithuania
- Coordinates: 55°35′16″N 26°25′29″E
- Basin countries: Lithuania
- Surface area: 2.2 km^{2} (0.85 sq mi)
- Average depth: 2.9 m (9 ft 6 in)
- Settlements: Visaginas

Lake Visaginas is located south of the town of Visaginas in eastern Lithuania.
