= Operation Vesna =

Soviet deportation from Lithuania

Operation Vesna (Russian: Опера́ция «Весна́», romanized: Operatsiya Vesna, lit. 'Operation Spring') was a mass deportation of the armed opposition to Soviet rule in occupied Lithuania carried out by the Ministry of State Security (MGB) on May 22–24, 1948.

According to the February 21, 1948 decree № 417—160сс of the USSR Council of Ministers, deportations were to target the "forest brothers" (Lithuanian: miško broliai), members of their families, and "various helpers of anti-Soviet partisans, including kulaks." The official tally of the deported was 49,331 (other sources give the number 39,766 and 47,534). In addition to ethnic Lithuanians, Poles and Belarusians were deported as well. The exact numbers by ethnicity are unknown. Their official status was "special settlers" (severely restricted in movement, but otherwise officially not deprived of other citizen's rights). It was the largest Soviet deportation from Lithuania.

== Life in exile ==
The majority of deportations were to Krasnoyarsk Krai (23,467), Irkutsk Oblast (11,495) and Buryat-Mongolian ASSR (4,038). About 25,000 worked in forest industry, and the rest in coal mines and kolkhozes. About 11,000 children were deported with their parents.

About 6,000 to 10,000 of the deportees were brought to Igarka. Later more Lithuanians were moved from other places of Krasnoyarsk Krai to Igarka. In the first years, about 1,000 to 3,000 Lithuanians died in Igarka, mostly children and the elderly. There are three Lithuanian cemeteries in Igarka, one of them has 1,000 burials. Many "settlers" were arrested an put to Gulag labor camps for various violations: trying to escape, singing Lithuanian "nationalist" songs, etc. During 1956–1961 most Lithuanians returned from Igarka to Lithuania. As of 1989 about 270 Lithuanians stayed in Igarka. The Lithuanian Union of Igarka was established in 1992.
