= Kunduz massacre =

War crime perpetrated by the Soviet Army

- Part of Atrocity crimes in the Soviet–Afghan War
- Map of Afghanistan with Kunduz Province highlighted
- Location: Kunduz Province, Afghanistan
- Date: 22 December 1984
- Target: Afghan civilians and anti-communists
- Attack type: mass murder, massacre
- Deaths: ~250
- Perpetrator: USSR
- Motive: reprisals against civilians for anti-communist resistance members

The Kunduz massacre was a war crime perpetrated by the Soviet Army on 22 December 1984 in the village of Haji Rahmatullah in the Kunduz Province, during the Soviet–Afghan War. Around 250 civilians were reportedly killed in what was described as Soviet reprisals against civilians for anti-communist resistance members and their military actions aimed against the Red Army.

According to a Helsinki Watch report based on eyerwitness testimony, the Soviet troops entered several villages of Issa Khel in the Char Dara District, Kunduz, on 14 December 1984 in their pursuit of Mujahideen fighters. The Soviet soldiers perpetrated several crimes there, including looting, wanton destruction, rape and murder. In one instance, they threw grenades into a house, killing the inhabitants. On their way back to Kunduz city, the Soviet column was ambushed by Mujahideen. In retaliation, on 22 December the Soviet Army and their collaborators from the Army of the Democratic Republic of Afghanistan surrounded the Haji Rahmatullah village, and then proceeded to systematically summary execute people in every house they would enter, including children and women. They would shoot them in the head. Three pregnant women were allegedly mutilated with bayonets. The village was set on fire and burned for five days. People offered the Soviets money, hoping they would bribe them to spare their lives, but were executed anyway. Anyone trying to escape the village was shot. Numerous villagers were locked in houses and killed when the Soviets set fire by throwing grenades inside.

In the aftermath, corpses were found burned. Some women were found lying and holding on to their dead babies. Green flags were placed to pay respect for the deceased buried under rubble. The survivors and the Mujahideen loaded the corpses onto waggons and transported them to Kunduz city, to protest against such acts. Along every village they passed through to Kunduz, they were received by people with tears. At the outskirts of Kunduz, the Governor and the KHAD officers there told them they could not do anything about it, causing outrage among the crowd. When the bodies were returned to Haji Rahmatullah, it was shelled, and thus the burials had to be rushed. One speculation is that the Soviets targeted the area because it was the home province of one of the Mujahideen leaders Gulbuddin Hekmatyar.

== See also ==
- Kulchabat, Bala Karz and Mushkizi massacre
- Rauzdi massacre
- Soviet war crimes

== Bibliography ==
- Bellamy, Alex J. (2012). Massacres and Morality: Mass Atrocities in an Age of Civilian Immunity. OUP Oxford. ISBN 9780199288427.
- Laber, Jeri; Rubin, Barnett R. (1988). "A nation is dying": Afghanistan under the Soviets, 1979-87. Evanston, Illinois: Northwestern University Press. ISBN 9780810107717. OCLC 1030585463.
- Sands, Chris; Qazizai, Fazelminallah (2019). Night Letters: Gulbuddin Hekmatyar and the Afghan Islamists Who Changed the World. Oxford University Press. ISBN 9781787383616.
- Helsinki Watch (1985). "To Die in Afghanistan" (PDF). New York City. OCLC 767650694.
