= Zabrak =

- Village
- Location in Afghanistan
- Coordinates: 35°24′3″N 66°16′50″E
- Country: Afghanistan
- Province: Sar-e Pol Province
- District: Balkhab District
- Time zone: + 4.30

Zabrak is a village in Balkhab District, Sar-e Pol Province, in northern Afghanistan. It lies north of Gawanak, south of Alar, and west of Jawak and Chiras. The nearest major towns are Mazar-i-Sharif to the northeast and Meymaneh to the northwest.

== See also ==
- Sar-e Pol Province
