= Chiras, Afghanistan =

Chiras
- Village
- Location in Afghanistan
- Coordinates: 35°25′N 65°59′E
- Country: Afghanistan
- Province: Sar-e Pol
- Elevation: 2,691 m (8,829 ft)
- Time zone: + 4.30

Chiras is a major village and valley in Sar-e Pol Province, in northern Afghanistan. It was formerly in Jowzjan Province. The village lies north of Jawak, west of Zabrak and southeast of Khami Deh. The people of Chiras are said to be Murghabi Tajiks. The main occupation is agriculture, with most of the fertile lands lying to the west of the village and a narrow strip to the south.

In December 1883, Chiras was the subject of a confrontation between Maimana troops and Dilawar Khan. Khan was forced to abandon Chiras.

== Climate ==
Chiras has a subarctic climate (Köppen: Dsc) with mild, dry summers and cold, snowy winters. The warmest month, on average, is July with an average temperature of 15.1 °C (59.2 °F). The coolest month on average is January, with an average temperature of −9.1 °C (15.6 °F).

Climate data for Chiras, Sar-e Pul Province
Month	Jan	Feb	Mar	Apr	May	Jun	Jul	Aug	Sep	Oct	Nov	Dec	Year
Mean daily maximum °C (°F)	−3.3 (26.1)	−2.2 (28.0)	3.2 (37.8)	10.2 (50.4)	15.2 (59.4)	20.5 (68.9)	23.5 (74.3)	22.6 (72.7)	18.1 (64.6)	11.7 (53.1)	5.4 (41.7)	0.5 (32.9)	10.5 (50.8)
Daily mean °C (°F)	−9.1 (15.6)	−7.5 (18.5)	−2.2 (28.0)	4.2 (39.6)	8.1 (46.6)	12.4 (54.3)	15.1 (59.2)	13.8 (56.8)	9.0 (48.2)	3.7 (38.7)	−1.5 (29.3)	−5.2 (22.6)	3.4 (38.1)
Mean daily minimum °C (°F)	−14.9 (5.2)	−12.9 (8.8)	−7.6 (18.3)	−1.8 (28.8)	1.1 (34.0)	4.3 (39.7)	6.8 (44.2)	5.1 (41.2)	−0.1 (31.8)	−4.3 (24.3)	−8.4 (16.9)	−10.9 (12.4)	−3.6 (25.5)
Average precipitation mm (inches)	52 (2.0)	66 (2.6)	90 (3.5)	82 (3.2)	58 (2.3)	17 (0.7)	5 (0.2)	5 (0.2)	2 (0.1)	12 (0.5)	29 (1.1)	46 (1.8)	464 (18.2)
Source: weather2visit.com

== See also ==
- Sar-e Pol Province
