= Padkhwab-e Shana massacre =

War crime committed by the Red Army

- Part of Atrocity crimes in the Soviet–Afghan War
- Map of Afghanistan with Logar Province highlighted
- Location: 33°56'23.0"N 68°56'34.9"E; Logar Province, Afghanistan
- Date: 13 September 1982
- Target: Afghan civilians and anti-communists
- Attack type: mass murder, massacre
- Deaths: 180
- Perpetrator: USSR
- Motive: reprisals against civilians for anti-communist resistance members

The Padkhwab-e Shana massacre or Pad Khwab-e Shanah massacre was a war crime perpetrated by the Soviet Army on 13 September 1982 in the village of Padkhwab-e Shana in the Logar Province, Afghanistan, during the Soviet–Afghan War. The people were murdered in what was described as Soviet reprisals against civilians for anti-communist resistance members and their military actions aimed against the Red Army. When a Red Army unit entered the town with a population of about 10,000 to search for resistance members, several villagers and armed combatants hid in a qanat, an underground irrigation canal. The Russian commander told the elders to bring out all the people in the tunnel, but the elders said there is nobody there. When one man emerged from the stairway, contradicting the elders, the Russian commander ordered that all the people under ground come out. When the people below refused, the Russian officials poured a flammable liquid through three vertical well shafts that lead to the qanat, presumed to be a mix of gasoline, pentrite and trinitrotoluene, to rout them out. A military vehicle added a bag of white powder to the mix; men wearing suits and masks with goggles went down the stairs at the entrance of the canal and dispersed the white powder into the water. The Soviet Army then fired with machine guns at the entrances, causing massive explosions of the canals. The people inside the canal were killed by being burned alive. They were either hiding to avoid military drafting or were afraid of Soviet attacks. The Soviet soldiers laughed and cheered after the explosions. According to the reports, 11 villagers were forced to look at the murders by the Red Army.

105 people were killed in the crime, including children, old people and combatants. 61 of the victims were villagers. Hundreds of Red Army soldiers stayed in the village, to look if any combatants would intervene to defend the village. Six helicopters and two jet fighters provided air support to the Red Army unit. They left the following day. It took seven days for the villagers to remove all the corpses from the canal, since the chemicals in the water would burn the feet of the people who tried to descend down the canal. 2,500 armed guerrillas showed up later in the village, to prevent the Soviet Army to return to it. The Afghan embassy rejected the witness accounts of the massacre, claiming that the tunnels are too small for people to hide in them, though investigators contradicted them, claiming that the said tunnels are over four feet in height. A witness described the aftermath:

The first day the population pulled out four bodies; the second day 30; the third, 68. Seven days later the last three. When we touched the bodies, pieces would stay in our hands. The first day, when we wanted to pull out the victims, the unbearable stench made us feel sick.

Three eyewitnesses described the crime at a news conference at Freedom House, New York City, on 28 January 1983.

== See also ==
- Soviet war crimes
- Kulchabat, Bala Karz and Mushkizi massacre

== Bibliography ==
- Bellamy, Alex J. (2012). Massacres and Morality: Mass Atrocities in an Age of Civilian Immunity. OUP Oxford. ISBN 9780199288427.
- Human Rights Watch (1984). "Tears, Blood and Cries. Human Rights in Afghanistan Since the Invasion 1979 - 1984" (PDF). New York City. OCLC 1030792539.
- United Nations Commission on Human Rights (1985). "Report on the situation of human rights in Afghanistan / prepared by the Special Rapporteur, Felix Ermacora, in accordance with Commission on Human Rights resolution 1984/55".
