= Soviet war crimes in the Soviet–Afghan War =

1979–1989 killings in Afghanistan

Atrocities of the Soviet Union and its allies in Afghanistan
- Part of Soviet–Afghan War
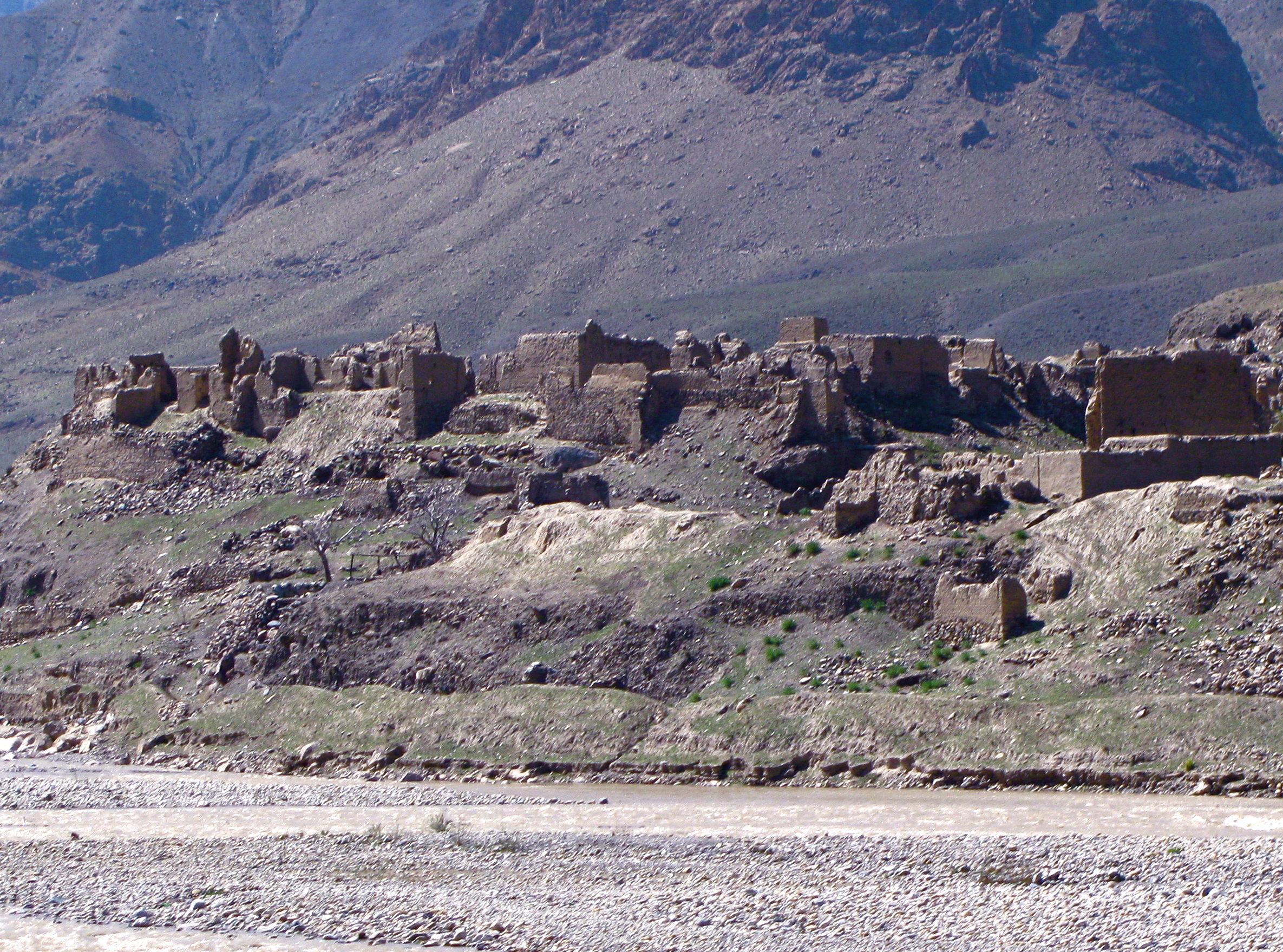
- An Afghan village left in ruins after being destroyed by Soviet forces
- Location: Afghanistan
- Date: 1979–1989
- Target: Afghan citizens, Afghan mujahideen
- Attack type: Genocide (alleged), forced displacement, carpet bombing, sexual violence, massacre, crimes against humanity, democide
- Deaths: 562,000 to 2,000,000
- Injuries: 3,000,000
- Victims: 5,000,000 externally displaced 2,000,000 internally displaced
- Perpetrators: Soviet Armed Forces; Afghan Armed Forces
- Motive: Counterinsurgency, Sovietization, Islamophobia

Atrocity crimes in the Soviet–Afghan War were systematically perpetrated on a large scale by the Soviet Union and its allies from 1979 to 1989, with several scholars and academics concluding that the Soviet military forces carried out a campaign of genocide against Afghans. The war resulted in the deaths of between 1,000,000 and 3,000,000 Afghans. Estimates of Afghan civilian deaths vary from 562,000 to 2,000,000. Human Rights Watch concluded that the Soviet Red Army and the Afghan Army perpetrated war crimes and crimes against humanity in Afghanistan, intentionally targeting civilians and civilian areas for attack, and killing and torturing prisoners.

== Pre-invasion repression ==
Afghan president Mohammed Daoud Khan was deposed and murdered in 1978's Saur Revolution by the Khalqist faction of People's Democratic Party of Afghanistan (PDPA), who subsequently established their own government, the Democratic Republic of Afghanistan. Political scientist Barnett Rubin wrote, "Khalq used mass arrests, torture, and secret executions on a scale Afghanistan had not seen since the time of Abdur Rahman Khan, and probably not even then". After gaining power, the Khalqists unleashed a campaign of "red terror", killing more than 27,000 people in the Pul-e-Charkhi prison, prior to the Soviet invasion of Afghanistan in December 1979. Political scientist Olivier Roy estimated between 50,000 and 100,000 people disappeared during the Taraki–Amin period.

== Crimes ==
After Soviet Union invaded Afghanistan, deposing and killing Hafizullah Amin in Operation Storm-333 and installing Babrak Karmal as General Secretary, the brutality of communists intensified. The army of the Soviet Union killed large numbers of Afghans, attempting to suppress resistance from the Afghan mujahideen. Numerous mass murders were perpetrated by the Soviet Army during the summer of 1980. Soviet forces also launched chemical attacks against civilian populations. During the 1980s, the communist PDPA regime also killed and tortured thousands of individuals in the Pul-e-Charkhi prison.

=== Murder, willful killings, massacres ===
Several massacres were reported by the Soviet Army. In the September 1982 Padkhwab-e Shana massacre, the Soviet Army threw a mix of gasoline, pentrite and trinitrotoluene inside a qanat where locals were hiding, and then ignited an explosion, killing them. 105 people were killed in the crime, including children, old people and combatants. In the October 1983 Kulchabat, Bala Karz and Mushkizi massacre, up to 360 people were gathered at the three village squares and shot, including 20 girls and over a dozen older people. In March 1984, a hundred civilians were massacred in two villages in the Kohistanat District; Dash-e-Bolokhan and Dash-e-Sulukhan; while 40 civilians were killed in Zirvq village, Urgun District, in November 1984. In the December 1984 Kunduz massacre, in the village of Haji Rahmatullah in the Kunduz Province, around 250 civilians were reportedly killed in what was described as Soviet reprisals against civilians for anti-communist resistance members and their military actions aimed against the Soviet Army. In April 1985, in the Laghman massacre in the villages of Kas-Aziz-Khan, Charbagh, Bala Bagh, Sabzabad, Mamdrawer, Haider Khan and Pul-i-Joghi in the Laghman Province, between 500 and 1,000 civilians were murdered in what was described as Soviet reprisals against civilians for anti-communist resistance members and their military actions aimed against the Soviet Army.

We were ordered by our officers that when we attack a village, not one person must be left alive to tell the tale. If we refuse to carry out these orders, we get it in the neck ourselves.

— Soviet Private Oleg Khlan, 1984

The army of the Soviet Union killed large numbers of Afghans to suppress their resistance. In one notable incident the Soviet Army committed mass killing of civilians in the summer of 1980. To separate the Mujahideen from the local populations and eliminate their support, the Soviet army killed many civilians, drove many more Afghans from their homes, and used scorched-earth tactics to prevent their return. They used booby traps, mines, and chemical substances throughout the country. The Soviet army indiscriminately killed combatants and non-combatants to terrorize local populations into submission. The provinces of Nangarhar, Ghazni, Laghman, Kunar, Zabul, Kandahar, Badakhshan, Logar, Paktia and Paktika witnessed extensive depopulation programmes by the Soviet forces.

Overall, between 6.5 and 11.5% of Afghanistan's population is estimated to have perished in the war. Anti-government forces were also responsible for some casualties. Rocket attacks on Kabul's residential areas caused more than 4,000 civilian deaths in 1987 according to the UN's Ermacora. Scholar Antonio Giustozzi estimates 150,000 to 180,000 mujahedeen casualties, of which half of them died. He also puts the fatalities of the communist-allied Democratic Republic of Afghanistan at over 58,000 by 1989.

=== Rape ===
The Soviet forces abducted Afghan women in helicopters while flying in the country in search of Mujahideen. In November 1980 a number of such incidents had taken place in various parts of the country, including Laghman and Kama. Soviet soldiers as well as KhAD agents kidnapped young women from the city of Kabul and the areas of Darul Aman and Khair Khana, near the Soviet garrisons, to rape them. Women who were taken and raped by Soviet soldiers were considered 'dishonoured' by their families if they returned home. Deserters from the Soviet Army in 1984 also reported the atrocities by Soviet troops on Afghan women and children, including rape.

=== Indiscriminate attacks and bombardments ===
46% of all Afghan fatalities were killed by Soviet bombardments of cities and villages, amounting to 400,000 civilian deaths, meaning that, on average, 26 civilians were killed per each killed Soviet soldier. In one case in October 1984, 300 families fleeing to Pakistan were bombed by Soviet forces in Chaghcharan, Ghor Province. Hospitals were bombed in 1981 in Ostoma, and again in 1982 and 1984. Some of the hospitals removed their insignia of the Red Cross to avoid being the target of the Soviet Air Force.

=== Scorched-earth tactics and wanton destruction ===
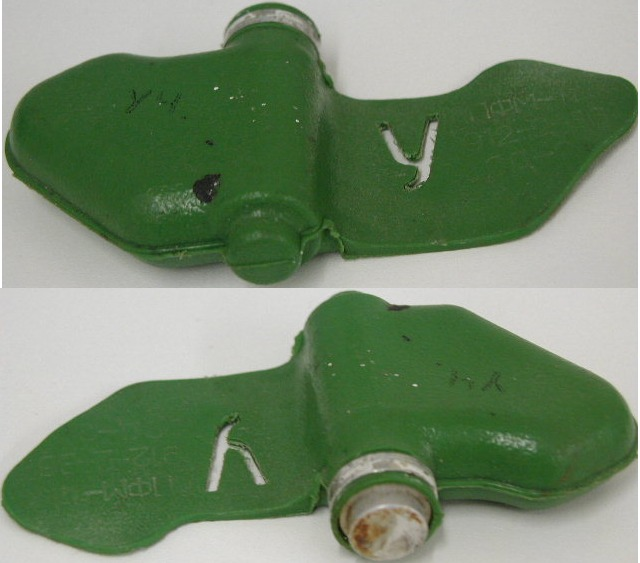
A PFM-1 mine, often mistaken for a toy by children. The mine's shape was dictated by aerodynamics.

Irrigation systems, crucial to agriculture in Afghanistan's arid climate, were destroyed by aerial bombing and strafing by Soviet or government forces. In the worst year of the war, 1985, well over half of all the farmers who remained in Afghanistan had their fields bombed, and over one quarter had their irrigation systems destroyed and their livestock shot by Soviet or government troops, according to a survey conducted by Swedish relief experts.

The scorched-earth strategy implemented by the Soviet Air Force consisted of carpet bombing of cities and indiscriminate bombings that destroyed entire villages. Millions of land-mines were planted by Soviet military across Afghanistan. Around 90% of Kandahar's inhabitants were de-populated, as a result of Soviet atrocities during the war.

Everything was the target in the country, from cities, villages, up to schools, hospitals, roads, bridges, factories and orchards. Soviet tactics included targeting areas which showed support for the Mujahideen, and forcing the populace to flee the rural territories the communists were unable to control. Half of Afghanistan's 24,000 villages were destroyed by the end of the war. Rosanne Klass compared the extermination campaigns of the Soviet military to the carnage unleashed during the Mongol invasion of Afghanistan in the 13th century.

The population of Afghanistan's second largest city, Kandahar, was reduced from 200,000 before the war to no more than 25,000 inhabitants, following a months-long campaign of carpet bombing and bulldozing by the Soviets and Afghan communist soldiers in 1987. Land mines had killed 25,000 Afghans during the war and another 10–15 million land mines, most planted by Soviet and government forces, were left scattered throughout the countryside. The International Committee of the Red Cross estimated in 1994 that it would take 4,300 years to remove all the Soviet land mines in Afghanistan, which continued to kill hundreds of people on yearly basis.

A great deal of damage was done to the civilian children population by land mines. A 2005 report estimated 3–4% of the Afghan population were disabled due to Soviet and government land mines. In the city of Quetta, a survey of refugee women and children taken shortly after the Soviet withdrawal found child mortality at 31%, and over 80% of the children refugees to be unregistered. Of children who survived, 67% were severely malnourished, with malnutrition increasing with age.

=== Forced displacement ===
5 million Afghans fled to Pakistan and Iran, 1/3 of the prewar population of the country, and another 2 million were displaced within the country, making it one of the largest refugee crises in history. In the 1980s, half of all refugees in the world were Afghan. In his report, Felix Ermacora, the UN Special Rapporteur to Afghanistan, enumerated 32,755 killed civilians, 1,834 houses and 74 villages destroyed, and 3,308 animals killed in the first nine months of 1985. Data cited by the World Bank shows that Afghanistan's population declined from 13.4 million (1979) to 11.8 million (1989) during the decade of Soviet occupation.

=== Maiming and mutilation ===
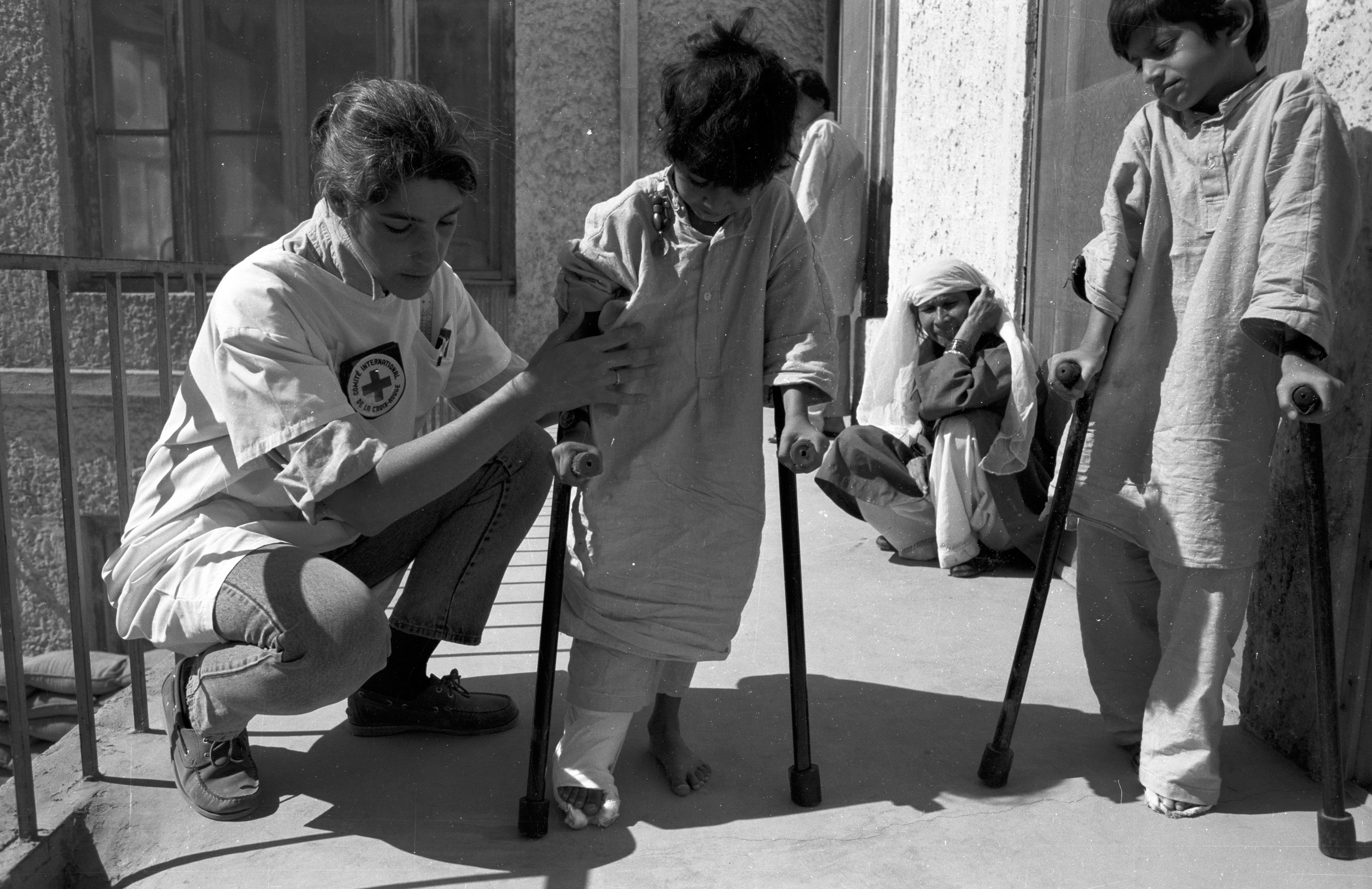
A member of the International Committee of the Red Cross helping a wounded Afghan child walk in 1986

In addition to fatalities, 1.2 million Afghans were disabled (Mujahideen, government soldiers and noncombatants) and 3 million maimed or wounded (primarily noncombatants).

=== Use of chemical weapons ===
There have also been numerous reports of illegal chemical weapons, including mycotoxins, being used by Soviet forces in Afghanistan, often indiscriminately against civilians. Instances include pouring poisonous chemicals into an underground irrigation channel in Padkhwab-e-Shana in 1982; bombs with poisonous gas killing cattle in Qargha and Uzbin; bombs whose explosion shatters chemicals over people's skin, burning it.

=== Torture ===
Amnesty International concluded that the communist-controlled Afghan government used widespread torture against inmates (officials, teachers, businessmen and students suspected of having ties to the rebels) in interrogation centers in Kabul, run by the KhAD, who were beaten, subjected to electric shocks, burned with cigarettes and that some of their hair was pulled out. Some died from these harsh conditions. Women of the prisoners were forced to watch or were locked up in the cells with the corpses. The Soviets were accused of supervising these tortures.

=== Looting ===
The Soviet soldiers were looting from the dead in Afghanistan, including stealing money, jewelry and clothes. During the Red Army withdrawal in February 1989, 30 to 40 military trucks crammed with Afghan historical treasures crossed into the Soviet Union, under orders from General Boris Gromov. He cut an antique Tekke carpet stolen from Darul Aman Palace into several pieces and gave it to his acquaintances.

== Analysis as genocide ==
Numerous scholars, researchers and academics have concluded that the Soviet military perpetrated a genocide of Afghans during the Soviet–Afghan War. These include American professor Samuel Totten, Australian professor Paul R. Bartrop, scholars from Yale Law School including W. Michael Reisman and Charles Norchi, writer and human rights advocate Rosanne Klass, political scientist Adam Jones, Professor of Russian History at Tel Aviv University Yaacov Ro'i, and scholar Mohammed Kakar. Louis Dupree stated that Afghans were victims of "migratory genocide" implemented by Soviet military. Average life expectancy in Afghanistan fell to 33 years in 1984. Sociologist Helen Fein wrote in an article published in 1993:

"Afghans became victims regardless of whether they fled or surrendered. This is particularly reflected in the indiscriminate Soviet bombing of refugee caravans and villages. Similarly, the victims of massacres were not protected by their surrender to Soviet troops. Thus, the destruction of Afghans was not incidental to military objectives but was a strategic objective in and of itself. ... The intent to destroy the Afghan people, without distinction between combatants and non-combatants, was demonstrated by the persistent pattern of mass killing and maiming of people in Afghanistan and the destruction of the environment and food producing areas by the Soviet Union and the DRA."

=== Cultural genocide ===
Afghan-American economist Nake M. Kamrany described the actions of the Soviet and government forces as "massive terrorism and cultural genocide". Critics describe the effect of the war on Afghan culture as working in three stages: first, the center of customary Afghan culture, Islam, was pushed aside; second, Soviet patterns of life, especially amongst the young, were imported; third, shared Afghan cultural characteristics were destroyed by the emphasis on the so-called Soviet nationalities system, with the outcome that the country was split into different ethnic groups, with no language, religion, or culture in common.

== Total casualties ==
The war resulted in the deaths of between 1,000,000 and 3,000,000 Afghans. Civilian death and destruction from the war was massive and detrimental. Estimates of Afghan civilian deaths vary from 562,000 to 2,000,000. By one estimate, at least 800,000 Afghans were killed during the Soviet occupation.

Rudolph Rummel, an analyst of political killings, estimated that between 1979 and 1987, Soviet forces were responsible for 250,000 democidal killings during the war and that the Soviet-backed PDPA government was responsible for 228,000 democidal killings. He also assumed that overall a million people died during the war. Noor Ahmed Khalidi calculated that 876,825 Afghans were killed up until 1987. Historian John W. Dower somewhat agrees with this estimate, citing 850,000 civilian fatalities, while the military fatalities "certainly totaled over 100,000". Marek Sliwinski estimated the number of war deaths to be much higher, at a median of 1.25 million, or 9% of the entire pre-war Afghan population. Scholars John Braithwaite and Ali Wardak accept this in their estimate of 1.2 million dead Afghans. However, Siddieq Noorzoy presents an even higher figure of 1.71 million deaths during the Soviet-Afghan war. Human Rights Watch organization concluded that the Soviet Red Army and its communist-allied Afghan Army perpetrated war crimes and crimes against humanity in Afghanistan, intentionally targeting civilians and civilian areas for attack, and killing and torturing prisoners.

== See also ==
- Hazara genocide
- 1998 Mazar-i-Sharif massacre
- Russell Tribunal
- Soviet war crimes
