= Kulchabat, Bala Karz and Mushkizi massacre =

War crime perpetrated by the Soviet Army

- Part of Atrocity crimes in the Soviet–Afghan War
- Map of Afghanistan with Kandahar highlighted
- Location: Kandahar Province, Afghanistan
- Date: 12 October 1983
- Target: Afghan civilians and anti-communists
- Attack type: mass murder, massacre
- Deaths: ~260–360
- Perpetrator: USSR
- Motive: reprisals against civilians for anti-communist resistance members

The Kulchabat, Bala Karz and Mushkizi massacre was a war crime perpetrated by the Soviet Army on 12 October 1983 in the villages of Kulchabat, Bala Karz and Mushkizi in the Kandahar Province, Afghanistan, during the Soviet–Afghan War. Reports indicate that up to 360 people were gathered at the three village squares and shot, including 20 girls and over a dozen older people.

According to a Human Rights Watch report, based on eyewitness testimonies, the said three villages were situated along a road between Kandahar and the Soviet military base at Mandisar airport. On 10 and 11 October, the Jamiat-e Islami resistance members attacked and destroyed several Soviet military vehicles in a convoy. Allegedly, seven tanks were destroyed. They were setting up military outposts around Kandahar. As a revenge, the Soviet Army and an Afghan collaborator who served as their interpreter went to Kulchabat, Bala Karz and Mushkizi villages, suspected of sheltering the guerilla fighters, and went from house to house, shooting people living there. In one house, they locked women and children inside a room and killed them by throwing grenades through the window, bayonetting any survivors. Their estimate is around 100 fatalities in Mushkizi and Bala Karz, as well as 160 to 170 fatalities in Kulchabat. A witness testified:

Everyone was dead. Ahadat, his wife, and his baby were lying on the floor covered with blood. His 9-year old daughter was hanging over the window, half in the house, half out. It looked like she was shot as she tried to run away. The young son of 13 years old lay crumpled in another corner with his head shot away. I threw up.

== See also ==
- Laghman massacre
- Rauzdi massacre
- Soviet war crimes
