= Kohistanat District =

Kohistanat کوهستانات
- District
- Location in Afghanistan
- Coordinates: 36°13′17″N 65°55′40″E
- Country: Afghanistan
- Province: Sar-e Pol
- Elevation: 2,600 m (8,500 ft)

Population
  - Religions: Islam
- Time zone: UTC+4:30

Kohistanat District (Pashto: کوهستانات Dari: کوهستانات) is a district of Sar-e Pol Province, Afghanistan.

== War in Afghanistan ==
In June, 2019, Afghan security forces launched clearance operations to remove insurgents from the district, killing 16 militants.

== Villages ==
- Aruj, Afghanistan
- Gawanak
- Jarghan
- Jawak
- Negala
