= Laghman massacre =

War crime perpetrated by the Soviet Army

- Part of Atrocity crimes in the Soviet–Afghan War
- Map of Afghanistan with Laghman highlighted
- Location: 34.66°N 70.20°E; Laghman Province, Afghanistan
- Date: April 1985
- Target: Afghan Mujahedin and anti-communists
- Attack type: mass murder, massacre
- Deaths: ~500 to ~1,000
- Perpetrator: USSR
- Motive: reprisals against civilians for anti-communist resistance members

The Laghman massacre was a war crime perpetrated by the Soviet Army in April 1985 in the villages of Kas-Aziz-Khan, Charbagh, Bala Bagh, Sabzabad, Mamdrawer, Haider Khan and Pul-i-Joghi in the Laghman Province, during the Soviet–Afghan War. Between 500 and 1,000 civilians were murdered in what was described as Soviet reprisals against civilians for anti-communist resistance members and their military actions aimed against the Soviet Army. The Soviet troops arrived with 200 tanks and armored personnel carriers on 11 March 1985 in the said villages in search for the Mujahideen, rejecting an offer from the Democratic Republic of Afghanistan to send their own troops to reduce the number of fatalities. According to the reports from Laghman, children were disfigured by the soldiers, while a hung baby was stabbed by a bayonet on a tree, and later its parents were killed.

The Soviet troops also destroyed crops, killed the livestock, plundered houses and then withdrew. A witness described that the Soviet troops broke into the houses by throwing grenades at the doors, and then claimed that they were searching for weapons and ammunition, but quickly resorted to stealing the civilians' belongings. At one point they started massively shooting people in a village. When the Mujahideen arrived to fight the Soviet troops, a clash erupted. 14 Soviet MiGs arrived and dropped 39 napalm bombs on the village, destroying houses and shops, causing fires which engulfed orchards and trees, and killed additional animals and people in the area. In another incident, 20 people were hiding inside a house. The Soviets set the house on fire and threw grenades inside, burning them alive.

It is one of the largest massacres perpetrated during the Soviet-Afghan War.

== See also ==
- Rauzdi massacre
- Soviet war crimes

== Bibliography ==
- Bellamy, Alex J. (2012). Massacres and Morality: Mass Atrocities in an Age of Civilian Immunity. OUP Oxford. ISBN 9780199288427.
- Goodwin, Jan (1987). Caught in the Crossfire: A Woman Journalist's Breathtaking Experiences in War-torn Afghanistan. Macdonald. ISBN 9780356144047.
- Helsinki Watch (1985). "To Die in Afghanistan" (PDF).
