= Rauzdi massacre =

1983 war crime perpetrated by the Red Army

Rauzdi massacre Rauza massacre
- Part of Soviet war crimes in the Soviet–Afghan War
- Map of Afghanistan with Ghazni highlighted
- Location: Ghazni Province, Afghanistan
- Date: 30 June 1983; 43 years ago
- Target: Afghan civilians and anti-communists
- Attack type: summary execution, massacre
- Deaths: 24
- Perpetrator: USSR
- Motive: reprisals against civilians for anti-communist resistance members

The Rauzdi massacre or Rauza massacre was a war crime perpetrated by the Soviet Army on 30 June 1983 in the village of Rauzdi, in the Ghazni Province, Afghanistan, during the Soviet–Afghan War. According to an Amnesty International report, 24 people were killed.

According to the Human Rights Watch report, based on eyewitness testimony, 23 of the fatalities were civilians, while one was an armed combatant. The Soviet Army surrounded the village at 2:00 am.

The Russian soldiers went from house to house, searching for anti-communist resistance members. They found one, the 18-year old Gholam Hazrat, who hid himself in the well of his garden. Gholam opened fire from the bottom of the well, killing a Russian officer, and wounding a soldier. As a reprisal, the Russian soldiers killed him, and then began shooting everyone in his house, including his father, cousin and two uncles. Afterwards, the Soviet soldiers rounded up several men from the village. The arrested men were beaten, looted, and in the end summarily executed on the streets.

== See also ==
- Laghman massacre
- Soviet war crimes

== Bibliography ==
- Amnesty International (1984). "1984 Amnesty International Report" (PDF). Archived from the original (PDF) on 14 June 2014.
- Human Rights Watch (1984). "Tears, Blood and Cries. Human Rights in Afghanistan Since the Invasion 1979 - 1984" (PDF). New York City. OCLC 1030792539.
- Bellamy, Alex J. (2012). Massacres and Morality: Mass Atrocities in an Age of Civilian Immunity. OUP Oxford. ISBN 9780199288427.
