= Soviet war crimes =

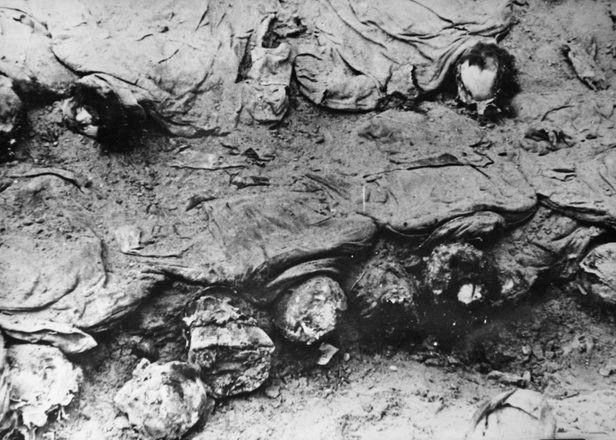
- Katyn massacre 1943 exhumation
- Location: Soviet Union member states, satellite nations and occupied territories: Soviet Union: Russia, Ukraine, Belarus and Transcaucasia (Georgia, Armenia and Azerbaijan (Note: Bolshevik repression of local revolts, such as those in Georgia, Armenia and Ganja (Azerbaijan))); Eastern Europe: Poland (Kresy), Finland and Karelia (Eastern Finland), Baltics (Latvia, Estonia and Lithuania), Romania (Bessarabia), Hungary, (Note: Especially during the Siege of Budapest and the Hungarian Revolution of 1956) Czechoslovakia, (Note: Especially during the Liberation of Czechoslovakia and the Warsaw Pact invasion in 1968) East Germany and Yugoslavia (Note: Mainly during the Belgrade offensive and subsequent Liberation of Northeast Yugoslavia between 1944–1945); East Asia: Xinjiang, (Note: During the Soviet invasion of Xinjiang and the Uyghur and Ili revolts in 1934, 1937 and 1944–46 respectively) Northeast China, (Note: During the invasion and subsequent occupation of Manchuria in 1945-46) North Korea and Japan (South Sakhalin and Kuril Islands); Afghanistan (Note: During the Soviet–Afghan War between 1979–1989)
- Date: 1917–1991
- Target: Polish, Ukrainian, Estonian, Latvian, Lithuanian, Belarusian and Romanian civilians, especially intelligentsia; Polish and Finnish POWs; Hungarian POWs and civilians; Japanese POWs and civilians; German POWs and civilians; Political dissidents; others
- Attack type: War crimes, crimes against humanity, mass murder, genocide, ethnic cleansing, collective punishment, deportation, starvation, forced labour, mass rape, looting and crimes against peace
- Perpetrator: Soviet Union (especially under the leadership of Joseph Stalin)
- Motive: Expansionism; Internal colonialism; Soviet Nationalism and Sovietization; State atheism; Cult of personality (especially under Stalin); Soviet Imperialism and Neocolonialism (especially during the Cold War); Russian nationalism and Russification (Note: Mostly during the Stalin era, especially from the late 1930s up until Khruschev's De-Stalinization); Racism and Antisemitism (Note: Stalin-era government propaganda and discourse promoting discriminatory, stereotypical and prejudiced views against Jews, Poles, Romanians, Ukrainians, Balts and Germans has sometimes been used as an example of state-sanctioned racism and antisemitism in the Soviet Union, though it is still debated if this actually affected Soviet internal policy in practice)

From 1917 to 1991, a multitude of war crimes and crimes against humanity were carried out by the Soviet Union or its constituent Soviet republics, including the Russian Soviet Federative Socialist Republic and its armed forces. They include acts which were committed by the Red Army (later called the Soviet Army) as well as acts which were committed by the country's secret police, NKVD, including its Internal Troops. In many cases, these acts were committed upon the direct orders of Soviet leaders Vladimir Lenin and Joseph Stalin in pursuance of the early Soviet policy of Red Terror as a means to justify executions and political repression. In other instances they were committed without orders by Soviet troops against prisoners of war or civilians of countries that had been in armed conflict with the Soviet Union, or they were committed during partisan warfare.

A significant number of these incidents occurred in Northern, Central, and Eastern Europe before, during, and in the aftermath of World War II, involving summary executions and the mass murder of prisoners of war (POWs), such as in the Katyn massacre and mass rape by troops of the Red Army in territories they occupied.

In the 1990s and 2000s, war crimes trials held in the Baltic states led to the prosecution of some Russians, mostly in absentia, for crimes against humanity committed during or shortly after World War II, including killings or deportations of civilians. Today, the Russian government engages in historical negationism. Russian media refers to the Soviet crimes against humanity and war crimes as a "Western myth". In Russian history textbooks, the atrocities are either altered to portray the Soviets positively or omitted entirely. In 2017, Russian president Vladimir Putin while acknowledging the "horrors of Stalinism", criticized the "excessive demonization of Stalin" by "Russia's enemies".

== Background ==
The Soviet Union did not recognize Imperial Russia's signing of the Hague Conventions of 1899 and 1907 as binding, and as a result, it refused to recognize them until 1955. This created a situation in which war crimes by the Soviet armed forces could be justified, and also gave Nazi Germany a legal cover for the atrocities it committed against Soviet prisoners of war.

== Russian Civil War ==
=== Blagoveshchensk massacre ===
In March 1918, over a thousand Blagoveshchensk residents were massacred by Red Guards who seized the city. Chekist I. P. Pavlunovsky reported that miners stormed the city, systematically killing those suspected of rebellion, including city administration staff and mining specialists. A 1919 press report corroborated the atrocities, stating over 1,000 locals were shot, with many students later joining the army. Far Eastern Socialist-Revolutionary-Maximalist I. I. Zhukovsky-Zhuk noted that ruthless, no-compromise methods, including summary executions, were common. He cited Amur authorities like Matveev and Dimitriev, both Communists, who shot dozens without trial, a practice known and tolerated by most, except for Blagoveshchensk anarchists.

=== Massacre of Kyiv ===
After the Battle of Kruty, which successfully delayed the Bolshevik advance on Kyiv and gave time for those who wanted to evacuate, the Red Guards approached the outskirts of Kyiv on February 4, 1918, where Mikhail Muravyov gave the order to begin the assault. During the capture of the capital, poison gas was used and massive shelling was carried out, which did not stop for several days (up to 15 thousand shells), as a result of which, among other things, the house of Mykhailo Hrushevsky was destroyed.

On Duma Square (today Maidan Nezalezhnosti), Muravyov was met by a delegation of the city council led by then-mayor Yevhen Ryabtsov. Andriy Polupanov was appointed Soviet commander in Kyiv. Entering the city, Soviet troops killed about 5,000 civilians, declared enemies. Among the dead were only two politicians: Secretary for Territorial Affairs of UPR Oleksandr Zarudny and Central Rada deputy Isak Puhach.

=== Vladivostok massacre ===
In early April 1920, former Kolchak government head P. V. Volgodsky met two officers in Shanghai who had fled Red Terror in Vladivostok. They reported that despite the socialist coalition government, Bolsheviks were actively arresting and killing Whites, often after torture. They stated, "In Vladivostok, there are systematic murders of White Guard officers. They are arrested and shot on their way to prison under the pretext of stopping escape attempts, etc."

=== Chita massacre and the elimination of the so-called "Semyonov jam" ===
Nestor Kalandarishvili's Red Army partisan detachment, known for its brutal attacks on the pro-White Buryat population, participated in capturing Chita and eliminating the "Semyonov jam." For example, in Fall 1920, the Khamnigan-Buryat Khoshun was devastated; three of its somons were completely deserted, and two others retained less than 200 of 6,000 inhabitants. Many who fled to Mongolia were killed, their bodies left unburied in March 1921, with over 70 corpses, including monks, women, and children, found near Byrtsin datsan. Beyond robbery, Kalandarishvili's unit also raped Buryat women and girls in late 1920. Despite the 5th Army command's accusations that Kalandarishvili's unit undermined Soviet power due to its criminal behavior, he faced no military sanctions, largely because his position had been strengthened by Lenin.

=== Amur River massacre ===
Yakov Ivanovich Tryapitsyn and Nina Lebedeva-Kiyashko's movement of two thousand troops down the Amur River involved the near-total extermination of rural intellectuals for "revolutionary passivity" and anyone resembling an urban "bourgeois." Priests were either drowned in ice-holes or taken prisoner, and even volunteers joining the partisans were shot.

One of Tryapitsyn's aides, Ivan Lapta, formed a Red Army detachment that "raided villages and camps, robbed and killed people," targeting those who withheld gold at the Limursk mines and looting Amgun gold mines and surrounding villages. Before occupying the regional center, Lapta's detachments, along with other Tryapitsyn associates, killed hundreds of Lower Amurians.

Tryapitsyn's unit included about 200 Chinese and 200 Koreans from taiga gold mines, led by Ilya Pak. Tryapitsyn provided them generous cash advances, promising gold and many Russian women. Partisan chiefs, appointed for their ruthless determination, maintained control by allowing their units to plunder and kill.

=== Nikolaevsk-on-Amur massacre ===
In 1920, Soviet Russia and Japan discussed a Far Eastern buffer state. Japan agreed to allow the Red Army into Vladivostok after Kolchak's government collapsed, forcing Bolsheviks to accept a socialist zemstvo due to the significant foreign troop presence. Meanwhile, Tryapitsyn's forces besieged and captured Nikolaevsk-on-Amur in late February after an artillery bombardment. The city, isolated and with limited defenders, was promised no atrocities by the entering Red Army, who even signed a pact with the Imperial Japanese Army garrison on February 28. However, the Red Army immediately began looting and killing.

The Red guerrillas violated their peace agreement with the Japanese garrison upon entering Nikolaevsk, killing residents and executing civilians sympathetic to the White Movement, including wealthy individuals. They then provoked the Japanese garrison, issuing an ultimatum to disarm, which Major Ishikawa, the Japanese commander, refused. On March 13, Ishikawa launched a preemptive strike, wounding Tryapitsyn. Despite this, Tryapitsyn organized resistance, overwhelming the Japanese garrison. The consul and all staff died in the consulate, which the guerrillas set ablaze. Tryapitsyn's unit also carried out brutal purges, exterminating Jewish women and children—children were killed with their mothers, and women were raped before execution. Jewish community members were drowned in the Amur River. These executions were systematically performed by dedicated squads of Russian, Korean, and Chinese partisans loyal to Tryapitsyn, who killed a set number of victims from a list nightly.

Tryapitsyn's unit retreated only after destroying the entire city, burning wooden buildings and blowing up stone structures. In late May and early June 1920, on orders from Tryapitsyn's headquarters, Nikolaevsk-on-Amur was annihilated, surrounding fishing grounds burned, and inhabitants murdered based on "trustworthiness" and social affiliation. Remaining Japanese prisoners and dissenting Red Army partisans were also killed. The forced evacuation of some residents into the taiga resulted in nearly all children under five dying. The remaining population was forcibly taken by the Red Army through the taiga to a "red island" in the middle Amur, leaving Nikolaevsk as desolate ashes. Thousands of Russians were massacred by the Red Army.

=== The Red Terror in Crimea ===
In late 1920 and early 1921, the Red Army carried out a mass extermination of Wrangel's army officers and soldiers, and civilians in Crimea. After seizing Crimea on November 21, 1920, Chekists formed the Crimean Strike Group under E. G. Evdokimov. These Chekists often bypassed investigations, relying on arrests and questionnaires to "judge" victims via troikas, leading to mass executions and incarcerations in concentration camps. Many arrestees, including women and teenagers, were immediately shot.

It's believed Yefim Yevdokimov's "expedition" of special agents killed at least 12,000 people. This figure, recorded in his commendation for the Order of the Red Banner, noted executions included "up to 30 governors, more than 150 generals, more than 300 colonels, several hundred counter-intelligence spies." Territorial Chekists also actively participated in the killings. M.M. Vikhman, a former head of the Crimean Cheka, later boasted of personally killing "an ennite number of thousands of White Guards." Additionally, Red partisans exterminated at least 3,000 Crimeans.

However, this terror sparked armed resistance and widespread indignation among local communists, who complained to central authorities. Consequently, in June 1921, a Plenipotentiary Commission began work in Crimea. M.H. Sultan-Galiev, a commission member, reported that Crimean workers estimated 20,000 to 25,000 Wrangel officers were shot across Crimea, with up to 12,000 in Simferopol alone.

== Before World War II ==
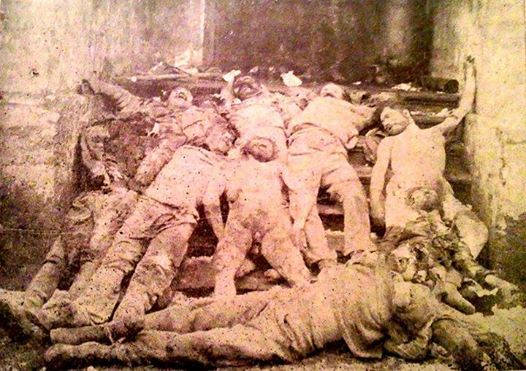
Victims of a Soviet-perpetrated massacre in Yerevan, Armenia during the suppression of the February Uprising of 1921

The Soviets reportedly deployed mustard gas bombs during the 1934 Soviet invasion of Xinjiang, many civilians were also killed by conventional bombs dropped by Soviet and aligned forces during the invasion.

=== Red Army and pogroms ===
The early Soviet leaders publicly denounced antisemitism, efforts were made by Soviet authorities to contain anti-Jewish bigotry notably during the Russian Civil War, and soldiers were punished whenever the Red Army units perpetrated pogroms, as well as during the Soviet invasion of Poland in 1919–1920 at Baranovichi. Only a small number of pogroms were attributed to the Red Army, with the majority of the 'collectively violent' acts in the period having been committed by anti-communist and nationalist forces.

The pogroms were condemned by the Red Army high command and guilty units were disarmed, while individual pogromists were court-martialed and faced execution. Although pogroms by Ukrainian units of the Red Army still occurred even after this, Jews regarded the Red Army as the only force which was willing to protect them. It is estimated that 3,450 Jews or 2.3 percent of the Jewish victims killed during the Russian Civil War were murdered by the Bolshevik forces. In comparison, according to the Morgenthau Report, a total of about 300 Jews died in all incidents involving Polish responsibility. However, as William Korey wrote: "Anti-Jewish discrimination had become an integral part of Soviet state policy ever since the late thirties...", as the new Stalin government moved to fight against perceived "Jewish infiltration" in the country, as well as growing conspiracies of "Jewish collaboration with the west and the Bourgeoisie".

== The Red Army and the NKVD ==
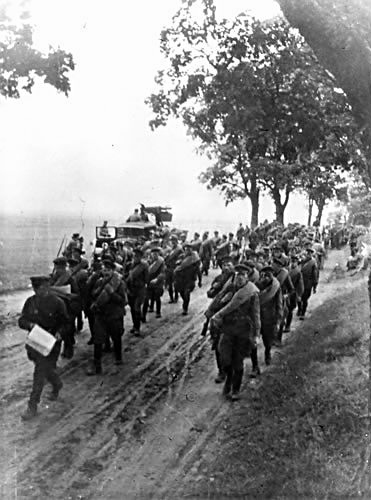
Soviet invasion of Poland, 1939. Advance of the Red Army troops.

On 6 February 1922, the Cheka (All-Russian Extraordinary Commission) secret police was replaced by the State Political Administration or OGPU, a section of the NKVD. The declared function of the NKVD was to protect the state security of the Soviet Union, which was accomplished by the large scale political persecution of "class enemies". The Red Army often gave support to the NKVD in the implementation of political repressions. As an internal security force and a prison guard contingent of the Gulag, the Internal Troops repressed political dissidents and engaged in war crimes during periods of military hostilities throughout Soviet history. They were specifically responsible for maintaining the political regime in the Gulag and conducting mass deportations and forced resettlement. The latter targeted a number of ethnic groups that the Soviet authorities presumed to be hostile to its policies and likely to collaborate with the enemy, including Chechens, Crimean Tatars, and Koreans.

== World War II ==
"... Whenever I mentioned the heartlessness of our highest-ranking bureaucrats, the cruelty of our executioners, I remember myself in my Captain's shoulder boards and the forward march of my battery through East Prussia, enshrouded in fire, and I say: 'So were we any better?'"

— Aleksandr Solzhenitsyn, The Gulag Archipelago

War crimes by Soviet armed forces against civilians and prisoners of war in the territories occupied by the USSR between 1939 and 1941 in regions including Eastern Poland, the Baltic states, Finland and Bessarabia, along with other war crimes in 1944–1945, have been ongoing issues within these countries. Since the dissolution of the Soviet Union, a more systematic, locally controlled discussion of these events has taken place.

Targets of Soviet atrocities included not only Axis collaborators (after 1941), but also members of anti-communist resistance movements in Eastern Europe, such as the Ukrainian Insurgent Army (UPA) in Ukraine, the Forest Brothers in the Baltic States, the Armia Krajowa in Poland and the Goryani in Bulgaria (as well as several Romanian and Chechen partisan groups). The NKVD also conducted the Katyn massacre, summarily executing over 20,000 Polish prisoners (which included both military, gendarme and police officers, but also many civilians, such as government officials, landowners, and intelligentsia) between April and May 1940.

=== Poland ===
==== 1939–1941 ====
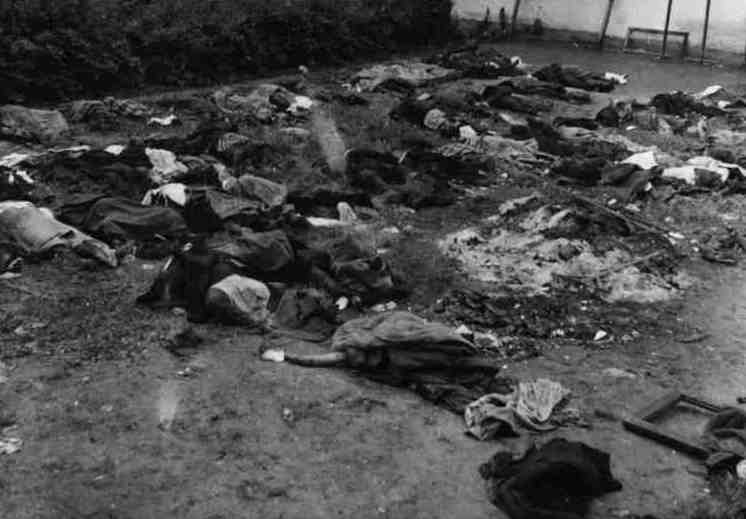
Victims of a NKVD prisoner massacre in Lwów in occupied Poland in June 1941

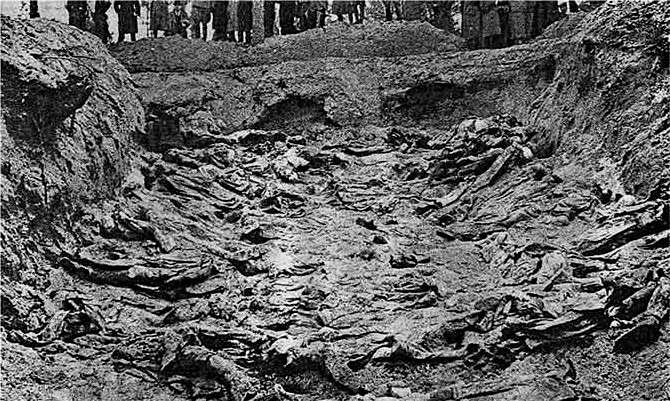
One of the mass graves at Katyn where the NKVD massacred thousands of Polish Officers, policemen, intellectuals and civilian prisoners of war.

In September 1939, the Red Army invaded eastern Poland and occupied it in accordance with the secret protocols of the Molotov–Ribbentrop Pact. The Soviets later forcefully occupied the Baltic States and parts of Romania, including Bessarabia and Northern Bukovina.

German historian Thomas Urban writes that the Soviet policy towards the people who fell under their control in occupied areas was harsh, showing strong elements of ethnic cleansing. The NKVD task forces followed the Red Army to remove 'hostile elements' from the conquered territories in what was known as the 'revolution by hanging'. Polish historian, Prof. Tomasz Strzembosz, has noted parallels between the Nazi Einsatzgruppen and these Soviet units. Many civilians tried to escape from the Soviet NKVD round-ups; those who failed were taken into custody and afterwards they were deported to Siberia and vanished in the Gulags.

Torture was used on a wide scale in various prisons, especially in those prisons that were located in small towns. Prisoners were scalded with boiling water in Bobrka; in Przemyślany, people's noses, ears, and fingers were cut off and their eyes were also cut out; in Czortków, the breasts of female inmates were cut off; and in Drohobycz, victims were bound together with barbed wire. Similar atrocities occurred in Sambor, Stanisławów, Stryj, and Złoczów. According to historian, Prof. Jan T. Gross:

We cannot escape the conclusion: Soviet state security organs tortured their prisoners not only to extract confessions but also to put them to death. Not that the NKVD had sadists in its ranks who had run amok; rather, this was a wide and systematic procedure.

— Jan T. Gross

According to sociologist, Prof. Tadeusz Piotrowski, during the years from 1939 to 1941, nearly 1.5 million persons (including both local inhabitants and refugees from German-occupied Poland) were deported from the Soviet-controlled areas of former eastern Poland deep into the Soviet Union, of whom 58.0% were Poles, 19.4% Jews and the remainder other ethnic nationalities. Only a small number of these deportees returned to their homes after the war, when their homelands were annexed by the Soviet Union. According to American professor Carroll Quigley, at least one third of the 320,000 Polish prisoners of war captured by the Red Army in 1939 were murdered.

It's estimated that between 10,000-35,000 prisoners were killed either in prisons or on prison trails to the Soviet Union in the few days after the 22 June 1941 German attack on the Soviets (prisons: Brygidki, Złoczów, Dubno, Drohobycz, and so on), with many more having already been killed before 1941 (such as in Grodno, Husynne and Mokrany).

==== 1944–1945 ====
In Poland, German Nazi atrocities ended by 1945, but they were replaced by Soviet oppression with the advance of Red Army forces. Soviet soldiers often engaged in plunder, rape and other crimes against the Poles, causing the population to fear and hate the regime.

Soldiers of the Polish Home Army (Armia Krajowa) were persecuted and imprisoned by Soviet forces as a matter of course. In 1945 alone, the number of members of the Polish Underground State who were deported to Siberia and various labor camps in the Soviet Union reached 50,000. Units of the Red Army carried out campaigns against Polish partisans and civilians. During the Augustów chase in 1945, more than 2,000 Poles were captured and about 600 of them are presumed to have died in Soviet custody. It was a common Soviet practice to accuse their victims of being fascists in order to justify their death sentences. The perversion of this Soviet tactic lay in the fact that practically all of the accused had in reality been fighting against the forces of Nazi Germany since September 1939. At that time the Soviets were still collaborating with Nazi Germany for more than 20 months before Operation Barbarossa started. Precisely therefore these kinds of Poles were judged capable of resisting the Soviets, in the same way that they had resisted the Nazis. After the War, a more elaborate appearance of justice was given under the jurisdiction of the Polish People's Republic orchestrated by the Soviets in the form of mock trials. These were organized after victims had been arrested under false charges by the NKVD or other Soviet controlled security organisations such as the Ministry of Public Security. At least 6,000 political death sentences were issued, and the majority of them were carried out. It is estimated that over 20,000 people died in Soviet prisons. Famous examples include Witold Pilecki or Emil August Fieldorf.

The attitude of Soviet servicemen towards ethnic Poles was better than their attitude towards the Germans, but it was not entirely better. The scale of rape of Polish women in 1945 led to a pandemic of sexually transmitted diseases. Although the total number of victims remains a matter of guessing, the Polish state archives and statistics of the Ministry of Health indicate that it might have exceeded 100,000. In Kraków, the Soviet entry into the city was accompanied by mass rapes of Polish women and girls, as well as the plunder of private property by Red Army soldiers. This behavior reached such a scale that even Polish Communists installed by the Soviet Union composed a letter of protest to Joseph Stalin himself, while church Masses were held in expectation of a Soviet withdrawal.

The Red Army was also involved in mass-scale looting in liberated territories.

=== Finland and Ingria ===
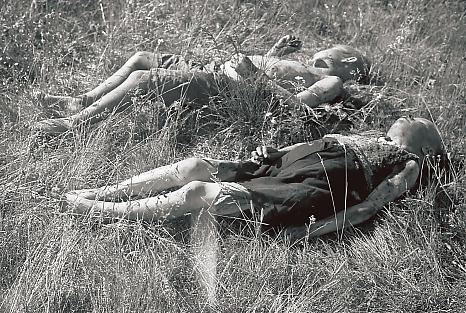
Finnish children killed by Soviet partisans at Seitajärvi in Finnish Lapland, 1942

Between 1941 and 1944, Soviet partisan units conducted raids deep inside Finnish territory, attacking villages and other civilian targets. In November 2006, photographs showing Soviet atrocities were declassified by the Finnish authorities. These include images of slain women and children. The partisans usually executed their military and civilian prisoners after a minor interrogation.

Around 3,500 Finnish prisoners of war, of whom five were women, were captured by the Red Army. Their mortality rate is estimated to have been about 40 percent. The most common causes of death were hunger, cold and oppressive transportation.

==== Deportation of the Ingrian Finns ====
By 1939, the Ingrian Finnish population had decreased to about 50,000, which was about 43% of 1928 population figures, and the Ingrian Finn national district was abolished. Following the German invasion of the Soviet Union and the beginning of the Leningrad Blockade, in early 1942 all 20,000 Ingrian Finns remaining in Soviet-controlled territory were deported to Siberia. Most of the Ingrian Finns together with Votes and Izhorians living in German-occupied territory were evacuated to Finland in 1943–1944. Finland was forced to return the evacuees per the Moscow Armistice. Soviet authorities did not allow the 55,733 people who had been handed over to settle back in Ingria, and instead deported them to central regions of Russia. The main regions of Ingrian Finns forced settlement were the interior areas of Siberia, Central Russia, and Tajikistan.

=== Baltic states ===
==== 1940–1941 ====
On 23 August 1939, the Soviet Union and Nazi Germany signed the Molotov–Ribbentrop Pact, in which, among the clauses, included the division of Eastern Europe, with the Baltic States being given to the Soviet sphere of influence. On 15 June 1940, Lithuania was invaded by the Red Army, with Latvia and Estonia being invaded and occupied between 16–17 June. The invasions occurred in only a matter of days, as around 500,000 Soviet troops entered the Baltic states virtually unopposed (except for a few incidents in Tallinn and one border skirmish in which Soviet troops exchanged fire with Latvian guards near the village of Maslenki), the occupations also coincided with a series of communist coup d'états in each country, supported by Soviet troops and the NKVD.

Soon after, the governments of Latvia, Lithuania and Estonia were removed (with some politicians like Kārlis Ulmanis even being imprisoned and later deported to Siberia), as communist-majority governments took power with Soviet backing. A series of show elections were held on the Baltics between June and July 1940, where only the Soviet-approved Communist parties (such as the Latvian Working People's Bloc) were allowed to participate, electing rubber stamp "People's Parliaments" which soon drafted resolutions to join the Soviet Union. The local standing armies were also broken up and replaced with "People's Self Defense" paramilitaries, as most of the officers were imprisoned, executed or deported. The ministries of foreign relations of all three countries were also closed, effectively isolating them from the rest of the world.

Lithuania, Latvia and Estonia were soon annexed by the Soviet Union between 3 and 6 August 1940, each of them being renamed as "Soviet Socialist Republics" (Estonian SSR, Lithuanian SSR, Latvian SSR), and by 25 August all citizens of these states had already been declared citizens of the Soviet Union.

===== Estonia =====
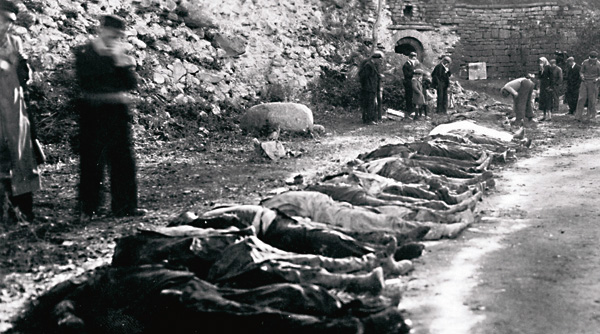
People killed by Soviet authorities in Kuressaare, Estonia, 1941.

In 1941, some 34,000 Estonians were drafted into the Red Army, of whom less than 30% survived the war. No more than half of those men were used for military service. The rest were sent to labour battalions where around 12,000 died, mainly in the early months of the war. After it became clear that the German invasion of Estonia would be successful, political prisoners who could not be evacuated were executed by the NKVD, so that they would not be able to make contact with the Nazi government. More than 300,000 citizens of Estonia, almost a third of the population at the time, were affected by deportations, arrests, execution and other acts of repression. As a result of the Soviet occupation, Estonia lost at least 200,000 people or 20% of its population to repression, exodus and war.

Soviet political repressions in Estonia were met by an armed resistance by the Forest Brothers, composed of former conscripts into the German military, Omakaitse militia and volunteers in the Finnish Infantry Regiment 200 who fought a guerrilla war, which was not completely suppressed until the late 1950s. In addition to the expected human and material losses suffered due to the fighting, over time this conflict led to the deportation of tens of thousands of people, along with hundreds of political prisoners and thousands of civilians died.

====== Mass deportations ======
On 14 June 1941, and the following two days, 9,254 to 10,861 people, mostly urban residents, of them over 5,000 women and over 2,500 children under 16, 439 Jews (more than 10% of the Estonian Jewish population) were deported, mostly to Kirov Oblast, Novosibirsk Oblast or prisons. Deportations were predominantly to Siberia and Kazakhstan by means of railroad cattle cars, without prior announcement, while the deported were given a few night hours at best to pack their belongings and separated from their families, usually also sent to the east. The procedure was established by the Serov Instructions. Estonians in Leningrad Oblast had already been subject to deportation since 1935.

====== Destruction battalions ======
In 1941, to implement Stalin's scorched earth policy, destruction battalions were formed in the western regions of the Soviet Union. In Estonia, they killed thousands of people including many women and children, and burned down dozens of villages, schools and public buildings. Many atrocities were committed by these forces, such as the case of a school boy named Tullio Lindsaar, who had all of the bones in his hands broken for hoisting the flag of Estonia before being bayoneted to death, or Mauricius Parts, son of Estonian War of Independence veteran Karl Parts, who was killed after being doused in acid, just six weeks after the imprisonment of his father by Soviet occupation forces (who would later also be executed by Soviet forces while in prison). In August 1941, all residents of the village of Viru-Kabala were killed including a two-year-old child and a six-day-old infant, the battalions also occasionally burned people alive, according to survivors of the massacres. A partisan war broke out in response to the atrocities of the destruction battalions, with tens of thousands of men forming the Forest Brothers to protect the local population from these battalions; in general, the destruction battalions murdered ~1,850 people in Estonia, almost all of them partisans or unarmed civilians.

Another example of the destruction battalions' actions is the Kautla massacre, where twenty civilians were murdered and tens of farms and houses looted, burned down or destroyed, with many of the people killed after being tortured and beaten by Soviet troops. The low toll of human deaths in comparison with the number of burned farms is due to the Erna long-range reconnaissance group breaking the Red Army blockade on the area, allowing many civilians to escape.

===== Latvia =====
In the 1941 June deportation, tens of thousands of Latvians, including whole families with women, children and old people, were taken from their homes, loaded onto freight trains and taken to Gulag correctional labour camps or forced settlements in Siberia by the Soviet occupation regime on the orders of high authorities in Moscow. Prior to the deportation, the People's Commissariat established operational groups who performed arrests, and search and seizure of property. Arrests took place in all parts in Latvia including rural areas.

===== Lithuania =====
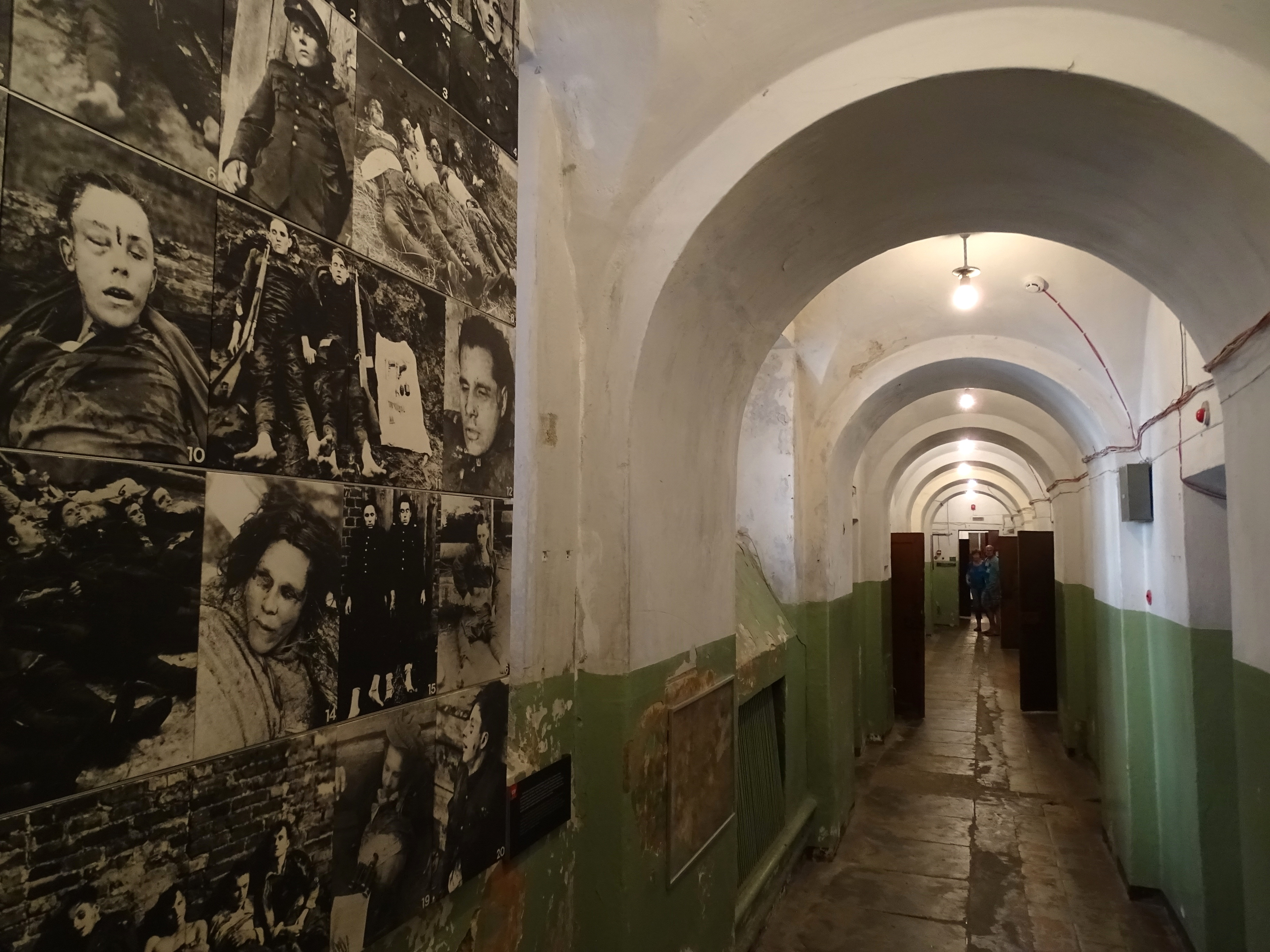
Corridor in the Museum of Occupations and Freedom Fights with display of the Lithuanian partisans killed by the Soviet forces in Lithuania

Between 1940 and 1941, thousands of Lithuanians were arrested and hundreds of political prisoners were arbitrarily executed. More than 17,000 people were deported to Siberia in June 1941. After the German invasion of the Soviet Union, the Soviet political apparatus was either destroyed or retreated east. Lithuania was then occupied by Nazi Germany for a little over three years. In 1944, the Soviet Union reoccupied Lithuania. Following World War II and the subsequent suppression of the Lithuanian Forest Brothers, the Soviet authorities executed thousands of resistance fighters and civilians, whom they accused of helping them. Some 300,000 Lithuanians were deported or sentenced to terms in prison camps on political grounds. Lithuania lost an estimated nearly 780,000 citizens in the Soviet occupation. Of these, around 440,000 were war refugees.

The estimated death toll in Soviet prisons and camps between 1944 and 1953 was at least 14,000. The estimated death toll among deportees between 1945 and 1958 was 20,000, including 5,000 children.

=== Romania ===
The Soviet Union also committed war crimes in Romania or against Romanians from the beginning of the occupation of Bessarabia and Northern Bukovina in 1940 all the way to the German invasion in 1941, and later from the expulsion of the Germans in the region until 1958.

==== Massacres ====
One infamous example of a Soviet massacre against Romanian civilians was the Fântâna Albă massacre, in which between 1-3 thousand civilians were killed by the NKVD and Soviet Border Troops while attempting to escape to Romania. Such event has been referred to as the "Romanian Katyn".

Another massacre committed by Soviet troops was the Lunca massacre, where Soviet border troops opened fire against several Romanian civilians attempting to escape into Romania, killing 600 of them, only 57 managed to escape, with another 44 being arrested and tried as "members of a counter-revolutionary organization". 12 of them were sentenced to death, with the rest being sentenced to 10 years forced labour and 5 years loss of civil rights, the family members of those arrested and shot would later also be arrested and sent to Siberia and Central Asia.

==== Religious persecution and deportations ====
During the occupation, the Soviet government and army deported thousands of Romanian civilians from the occupied regions into "special settlements". According to a secret Soviet Ministry of Interior report dated December 1965, 46,000 people were deported from the Moldavian Soviet Socialist Republic for the period 1940−1953. On June 12–13 alone, around 29,839 members of families of "counter-revolutionaries and nationalists" from the Moldavian SSR (as well as the Chernivtsi and Izmail oblasts of the Ukrainian SSR) were deported to Kazakhstan, Komi, Krasnoyarsk, Omsk Oblast and Novosibirsk.

Between 1940 and 1941, around 53,356 people from Bessarabia and Northern Bukovina were mobilized for labour across the territory of the Soviet Union; though the mobilization was presented as "voluntary", refusal to work could result in penal punishment, while living and working conditions were also generally poor.

Thousands of Transylvanian Saxons would later be deported from 1944 to 1949 under Soviet occupation, with hundreds or even thousands dying on their way to camps in Siberia and Central Asia before being able to come back to their home country.

Religious persecution was also widespread, the Soviet government sought to exterminate all forms of organized religion in its occupied territories, often persecuting the Catholic, Protestant, Orthodox, Muslim and Jewish communities present, the Soviet political police arrested numerous priests, with others being arrested and interrogated by the Soviet NKVD itself, then deported to the interior of the USSR, and sometimes even killed.

=== Soviet Union ===
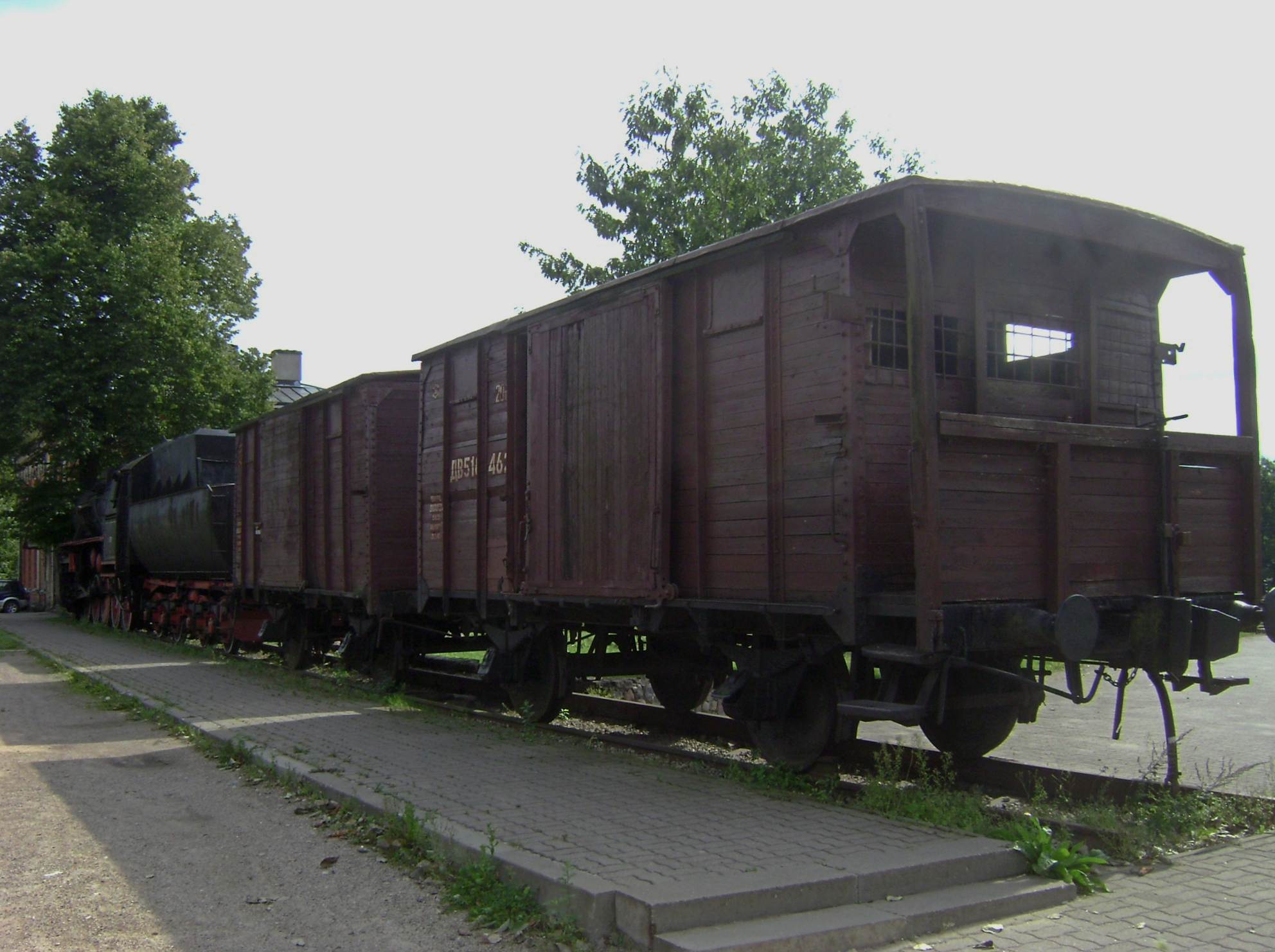
Freight train cars used to transport deportees (on display in Naujoji Vilnia)

==== NKVD prisoner massacres ====
Deportations, summary executions of political prisoners and the burning of foodstocks and villages took place when the Red Army retreated before the advancing Axis forces in 1941. In the Baltic States, Belarus, Ukraine, and Bessarabia, the NKVD and attached units of the Red Army massacred prisoners and political opponents before fleeing from the advancing Axis forces.

==== Crimea ====
===== Deportation of the Pontic Greeks =====
The prosecution of Greeks in the USSR was gradual: at first the authorities shut down the Greek schools, cultural centres, and publishing houses. Then, in 1942, 1944 and 1949, the NKVD indiscriminately arrested all Greek men 16 years old or older. All Greeks who were wealthy or self-employed professionals were sought for prosecution first. This affected mostly Pontic Greeks and other Minorities in the Krasnodar Krai and along the Black Sea coast. By one estimate, around 50,000 Greeks were deported.

On 25 September 1956, MVD Order N 0402 was adopted and defined the removal of restrictions towards the deported peoples in the special settlements. Afterward, many Soviet Greeks started returning to their homes, or emigrating towards Greece.

===== Deportation of the Crimean Tatars =====
After the retreat of the Wehrmacht from Crimea, the NKVD deported around 200,000 Crimean Tatars from the peninsula on 18 May 1944. 109,956 of them died, which represented 46% of the entire Crimean Tatar population.

==== Volga ====
===== Deportation of the Kalmyks =====
During the Kalmyk deportations of 1943, codenamed Operation Ulussy (Операция "Улусы"), the deportation of most people of the Kalmyk nationality (as well as Russian women married to Kalmyks, but not Kalmyk women married to people of other nationalities) in the Soviet Union (USSR), around half of all (97–98,000) Kalmyk people deported to Siberia died before being allowed to return home in 1957.

==== Northern Caucasus ====
Between 1943 and 1944, the Soviet government accused several ethnic groups in the North Caucasus of Axis collaboration. As "punishment", entire ethnic groups were deported, mostly to Central Asia and Siberia into labor camps.

===== Chechnya-Ingushetia =====
Map of the Chechen and Ingush regions of the Caucasus prior to the deportation

On 23 February 1944, Lavrentiy Beria, the head of the NKVD, ordered the deportation of the entire Chechen and Ingush population of the Checheno-Ingush ASSR by freight trains to remote areas of the Soviet Union (such as Siberia, the Urals and Central Asia). The operation was called "Chechevitsa" (Operation Lentil), (its first two syllables pointing at its intended targets), and is often referred to by Chechens as the "Aardakh" (the Exodus). The operation was started following complaints by the NKVD of "low level of discipline, prevalence of banditry and terrorism, disloyalty of the Chechens to the Communist party" and alleged "collaboration with the occupying German forces", citing an alleged confession of a German agent where he supposedly claimed that the German forces had "major support among the Ingush". The Chechen-Ingush Republic was never occupied by the German army, but the repressions were officially justified by "an armed resistance to Soviet power", although the charges of local collaboration with the Nazis were never subsequently proven in any Soviet court.

NKVD troops went systematically from house to house to collect individuals, the inhabitants were rounded up and imprisoned in Studebaker US6 trucks, before being packed into unheated and uninsulated freight cars, with the locals being given only about 15 to 30 minutes to pack for the surprise transfer. According to a correspondence dated 3 March 1944, at least 19,000 officers and 100,000 NKVD soldiers from all over the USSR were sent to implement this operation. The plan envisaged that 300,000 people were to be deported from the lowland in the first three days, while the remaining 150,000 people living in the mountain regions would be deported by the next days; some 500 people were also deported by mistake, even though they were not Chechens or Ingush. Through the initial deportations, ~478,479 people were forcibly resettled in the Aardakh: 387,229 Chechens and 91,250 Ingush; in May 1944, Beria issued a directive ordering the NKVD to browse the entire USSR in search for any remaining members of these ethnic groups, as a result, an additional 4,146 Chechens and Ingush were found in Dagestan, Azerbaijan, Georgia, Krasnodar, Rostov and Astrakhan, with the total number of deportees being reported by the NKVD as around 493,269 by May and ~496,460 by July. They were loaded onto 180 special trains, about 40 to 45 persons into each freight car, each family was allowed to carry up to 500 kg of personal belongings on the trip, Some 40% to 50% of the deportees were children; 333,739 people were evicted, of which 176,950 were sent to trains already on the first day of the operation, with Beriya reporting that there were only about six "cases of resistance", while 842 were "subject to isolation" and another 94,741 were removed from their homes by 11 PM. Much of the livestock owned by locals was later sent to kolkhozes in Ukrainian SSR, Stavropol Krai, Voronezh and Orel Oblasts, many of these animals perished from exhaustion during the following months.

The people were transported in cattle trains that were not appropriate for human transfer, lacking electricity, heating or running water. The exiles inside endured many epidemics (such as typhus), which lead to deaths from infections or hunger, survivors recall that the wagons were so full of people that there was barely any space to move inside them, and that the deportees were given food only sporadically during the transit and were not told where they would be taken to. The wagons did not even stop for bathroom breaks, with the passengers being forced to make holes in the floor to relieve themselves. The transit to Central Asia lasted for almost a month, with the special trains traveling almost 2,000 miles to reach their destinations. 239,768 Chechens and 78,479 Ingush were sent to the Kazakh SSR, whereas 70,089 Chechens and 2,278 Ingush arrived in Kirgiz SSR. Smaller numbers of the remaining deportees were sent to Uzbek SSR, Russian SFSR and Tajik SSR, the deportees arrived at the regions without shelter or food, and were in many occasions taken to special settlements, where all prisoners aged 16–45 would be forced to work in mines, farms, factories or construction in return for food stamps (with the threat of severe punishment if non-compliant), as well as report monthly to the NKVD office at the camp. Those that attempted to escape would be sent to gulags, and the children of the prisoners would inherit their "exile" status. Malnutrition (caused by the negligence of the authorities to provide food for the prisoners), alongside exhaustion (from overworking) and mistreatment from Soviet forces led to high death rates among the local population. Many deported children were beaten by the local guards for "disobedience", and many families were left without proper housing: only 5,000 out of the 31,000 families in Kirgiz SSR were provided with housing, with one district having prepared only 18 apartments for over 900 families, the Chechen and Ingush children also had to attend school in the local language, not their own.

On many occasions, resistance was met with slaughter, and in one such instance, in the aul of Khaibakh, about 700 people were locked in a barn and burned to death by NKVD General Mikheil Gveshiani, who was praised for this and promised a medal by Beria. Many people from remote villages were executed per Beria's verbal order that any Chechen or Ingush deemed 'untransportable should be liquidated' on the spot. This meant that those deemed too old or weak were to either be shot or left to starve in their beds alone. The soldiers would also sometimes rob from the empty homes. Those who resisted, protested or "walked too slow" were shot on the spot; in one incident, NKVD soldiers climbed up the Moysty mountain and found 60 villagers there, even though their commander ordered the soldiers to shoot the villagers, many soldiers instead fired in the air, the commander then ordered many of these soldiers to join the villagers while another platoon fired at all of them.

===== Kabardino-Balkaria =====
Lavrentiy Beria arrived in Nalchik on 2 March 1944, and on the early morning of 8 March 1944 (two days earlier than planned), Balkar's population was ordered to get ready to leave their homes. The entire operation lasted about two hours, with the entire Balkar population of the region being evicted. Around 17,000 NKVD troops and 4,000 local agents participated in the operation, which also saw many Balkar soldiers of the red army discharged (and, in some cases, even deported themselves) on charges of collaboration with the occupiers. By 9 March, 37,713 Balkars were deported in 14 train convoys, they arrived at their destinations in the Kazakh and Kyrgiz socialist republics by 23 March.

Official Soviet documents reveal that 562 people died during the deportation. Many more died during the harsh years in exile and in labor camps: in total, it is estimated that between 7,600 and 11,000 Balkars died as a consequence of the deportation, amounting to at least 19.82 percent of their entire ethnic group (though it could be as high as 20 or 25 percent).

=== Hungary ===
According to researcher and author Krisztián Ungváry, some 38,000 civilians were killed during the Siege of Budapest: about 13,000 from military action and 25,000 from starvation, disease and other causes. Included in the latter figure are about 15,000 Jews, largely victims of executions by Nazi SS and Arrow Cross Party death squads. Ungváry writes that when the Soviets finally claimed victory, they initiated an orgy of violence, including the wholesale theft of anything they could lay their hands on, random executions and mass rape. Estimates of the number of rape victims vary from 5,000 to 200,000. According to Norman Naimark, Hungarian girls were kidnapped and taken to Red Army quarters, where they were imprisoned, repeatedly raped and sometimes murdered.

Even embassy staff from neutral countries were captured and raped, as was documented when Soviet soldiers attacked the Swedish legation in Germany.

A report by the Swiss legation in Budapest describes the Red Army's entry into the city:

During the siege of Budapest and also during the following weeks, Russian troops looted the city freely. They entered practically every habitation, the very poorest as well as the richest. They took away everything they wanted, especially food, clothing and valuables... every apartment, shop, bank, etc. was looted several times. Furniture and larger objects of art, etc. that could not be taken away were frequently simply destroyed. In many cases, after looting, the homes were also put on fire, causing a vast total loss... Bank safes were emptied without exception—even the British and American safes—and whatever was found was taken.

According to historian James Mark, memories and opinions of the Red Army in Hungary are mixed.

=== Germany ===
According to historian Norman Naimark, statements in Soviet military newspapers and the orders of the Soviet high command were jointly responsible for the excesses of the Red Army. Propaganda proclaimed that the Red Army had entered Germany as an avenger to punish all Germans.

Some historians dispute this, referring to an order issued on 19 January 1945, which required the prevention of mistreatment of civilians. An order of the military council of the 1st Belorussian Front, signed by Marshal Rokossovsky, ordered the shooting of looters and rapists at the scene of the crime. An order issued by Stavka on 20 April 1945 said that there was a need to maintain good relations with German civilians in order to decrease resistance and bring a quicker end to hostilities.

==== Murders of civilians ====
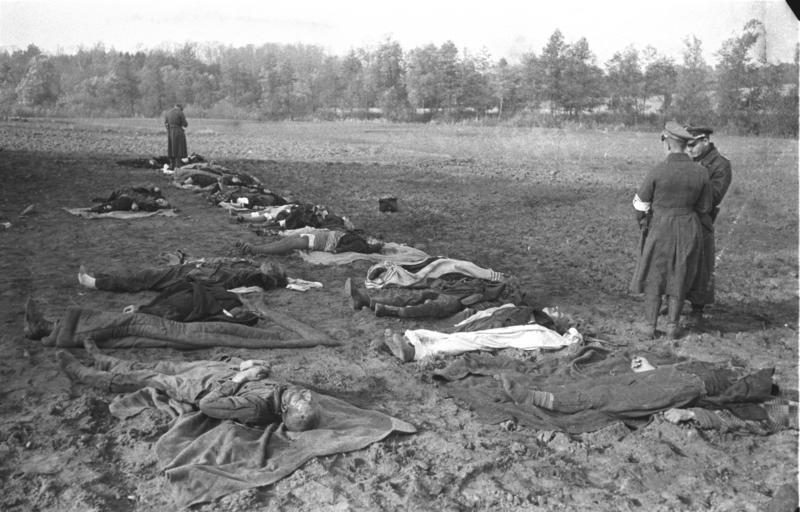
German civilians killed by Soviet soldiers in the Nemmersdorf massacre

On several occasions during World War II, Soviet soldiers set fire to buildings, villages, or parts of cities, and they used deadly force against locals who attempted to put out the fires. Most Red Army atrocities took place only in what was regarded as hostile territory, however, there were several massacres committed in Poland, e.g. the Przyszowice massacre. Soldiers of the Red Army, together with members of the NKVD, frequently looted German transport trains in Poland in 1944 and 1945. Upon reaching Germany proper, the Soviet Army engaged in the killing of both German civilians and POWs. Examples include the Metgethen massacre and the Nemmersdorf massacre.

For the Germans, the organized evacuation of civilians before the advancing Red Army was delayed by the Nazi government, so as not to demoralize the troops, who were by now fighting in their own country. Nazi propaganda—originally meant to stiffen civil resistance by describing in gory and embellished detail Red Army atrocities such as the Nemmersdorf massacre—often backfired and created panic. Whenever possible, as soon as the Wehrmacht retreated, local civilians began to flee westward on their own initiative.

Fleeing before the advancing Red Army, large numbers of the inhabitants of the German provinces of East Prussia, Silesia, and Pomerania died during the evacuations, some from cold and starvation, some during combat operations. A significant percentage of this death toll, however, occurred when evacuation columns encountered units of the Red Army. Civilians were run over by tanks, shot, or otherwise murdered. Women and young girls were raped and left to die. Women were raped regardless of their ideology, age or ethnicity, including women in their 80s and female German communists.

In addition, fighter bombers of the Soviet air force flew bombing and strafing missions that targeted columns of refugees.

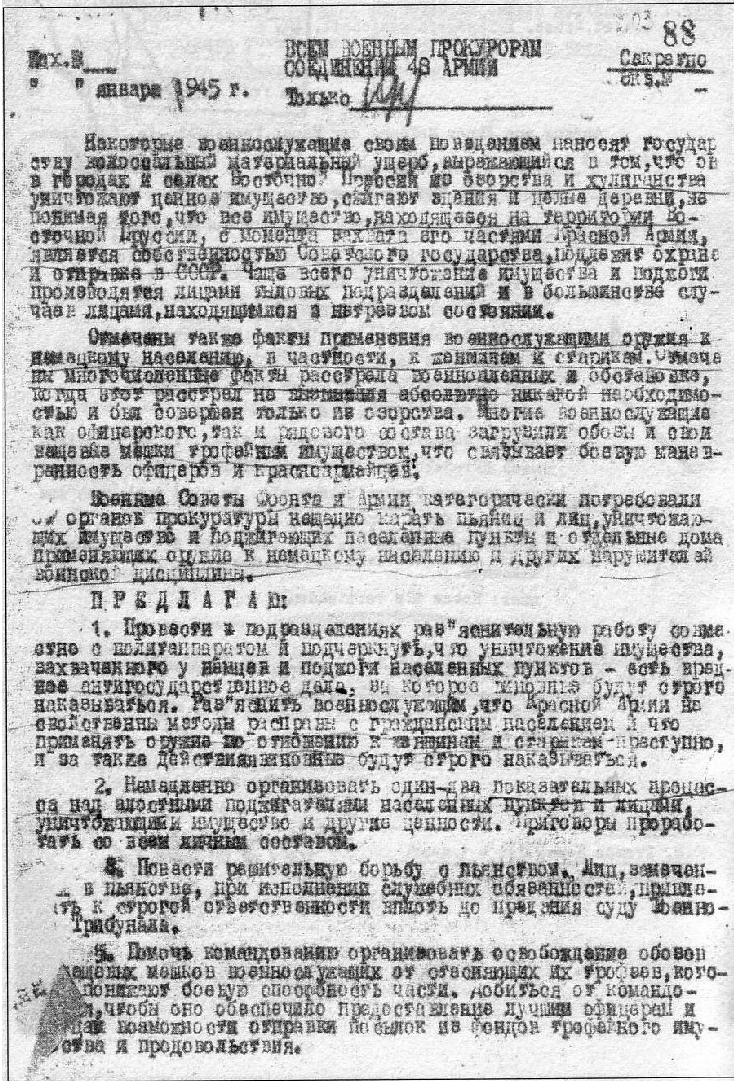
January, 1945: Soviet executive order to military prosecutors of the 48th Army for taking legal measures against rampant looting, burning of houses, and killing of civilians by the Red Army soldiers. Transcript available at the image description.

Although mass executions of civilians by the Red Army were seldom publicly reported, one such case occurred in Treuenbrietzen. During the first occupation of the town by the Red Army, on 21 or 22 April, a Soviet officer was shot. After the second occupation of the town following a retreat by the Wehrmacht, Red Army soldiers rounded up the civilians and shot the adult men in a nearby forest. The official estimate is between 30 and 166 civilian victims. Some German sources claimed about 1,000 victims, but this was rejected based on the actual number of town residents.

The first mayor of the Charlottenburg district of Berlin, Walter Kilian, appointed by the Soviets after the war ended, reported extensive looting by Red Army soldiers in the area: "Individuals, department stores, shops, apartments ... all were robbed blind."

In the Soviet occupation zone, members of the SED reported to Joseph Stalin that looting and rape by Soviet soldiers could result in a negative reaction by the German population towards the Soviet Union and the future of socialism in East Germany. Stalin is said to have angrily reacted: "I shall not tolerate anybody dragging the honour of the Red Army through the mud."

Accordingly, all evidence—such as reports, photos and other documents of looting, rape, the burning down of farms and villages by the Red Army—was deleted from all archives in the future GDR.

A study published by the German government in 1974 estimated the number of German civilian victims of crimes during expulsion of Germans after World War II between 1945 and 1948 to be over 600,000, with about 400,000 deaths in the areas east of Oder and Neisse (ca. 120,000 in acts of direct violence, mostly by Soviet troops but also by Poles, 60,000 in Polish and 40,000 in Soviet concentration camps or prisons mostly from hunger and disease, and 200,000 deaths among civilian deportees to forced labor of Germans in the Soviet Union), 130,000 in Czechoslovakia (thereof 100,000 in camps) and 80,000 in Yugoslavia (thereof 15,000 to 20,000 from violence outside of and in camps and 59,000 deaths from hunger and disease in camps). These figures do not include up to 125,000 civilian deaths in the Battle of Berlin. About 22,000 civilians are estimated to have been killed during the fighting in Berlin only.

==== Mass rapes ====
As Allied troops entered and occupied German territory during the later stages of World War II, mass rapes of women took place both in connection with combat operations and during the subsequent occupation of Germany. Scholars agree that the majority of the rapes were committed by Soviet occupation troops. Western estimates of the traceable number of rape victims range from tens of thousands to two million. Following the Winter Offensive of 1945, mass rape by Soviet males occurred in all major cities taken by the Red Army. Women were gang raped by as many as several dozen soldiers during the occupation of Poland. In some cases victims who did not hide in the basements all day were raped up to 15 times. According to historian Antony Beevor, following the Red Army's capture of Berlin in 1945, Soviet troops raped German women and girls as young as eight years old.

The explanation of "revenge" is disputed by Beevor, at least with regard to the mass rapes. Beevor has written that Red Army soldiers also raped Soviet and Polish women liberated from concentration camps, and he contends that this undermines the revenge explanation, they were often committed by rear echelon units.

According to Norman Naimark, after the summer of 1945, Soviet soldiers caught raping civilians usually received punishments ranging from arrest to execution. However, Naimark contends that the rapes continued until the winter of 1947–48, when Soviet occupation authorities finally confined troops to strictly guarded posts and camps. Naimark concluded that "The social psychology of women and men in the Soviet zone of occupation was marked by the crime of rape from the first days of occupation, through the founding of the GDR in the fall of 1949, until, one could argue, the present."

According to Richard Overy, the Russians refused to acknowledge Soviet war crimes, partly "because they felt that much of it was justified vengeance against an enemy who committed much worse, and partly it was because they were writing the victors' history."

=== Yugoslavia ===
According to Yugoslav politician Milovan Djilas, at least 121 cases of rape were documented, 111 of which also involved murder. A total of 1,204 cases of looting with assault were also documented. Djilas described these figures as, "hardly insignificant if it is borne in mind that the Red Army crossed only the northeastern corner of Yugoslavia". This caused concern to the Yugoslav communist partisans, who feared that stories of crimes committed by their Soviet allies would weaken their standing among the population.

Djilas writes that in response, Yugoslav partisan leader Joseph Broz Tito summoned the chief of the Soviet military mission, General Korneev, and formally protested. Despite having been invited "as a comrade", Korneev exploded at them for offering "such insinuations" against the Red Army. Djilas, who was present at the meeting, spoke up and explained the British Army had never engaged in "such excesses" while liberating the other regions of Yugoslavia. General Korneev responded by screaming, "I protest most sharply at this insult given to the Red Army by comparing it with the armies of capitalist countries."

The meeting with Korneev not only "ended without results", it also caused Stalin to personally attack Djilas during his next visit to the Kremlin. In tears, Stalin denounced "the Yugoslav Army and how it was administered." He then "spoke agitatedly about the sufferings of the Red Army and the horrors that it was forced to endure while it was fighting through thousands of kilometers of devastated country." Stalin climaxed with the words, "And such an Army was insulted by no one else but Djilas! Djilas, of whom I could least have expected such a thing, a man whom I received so well! And an Army which did not spare its blood for you! Does Djilas, who is himself a writer, not know what human suffering and the human heart are? Can't he understand it if a soldier who has crossed thousands of kilometers through blood and fire and death has fun with a woman or takes some trifle?"

According to Djilas, the Soviet refusal to address protests against Red Army war crimes in Yugoslavia enraged Tito's government and it was a contributing factor in Yugoslavia's subsequent exit from the Soviet Bloc.

=== Czechoslovakia ===
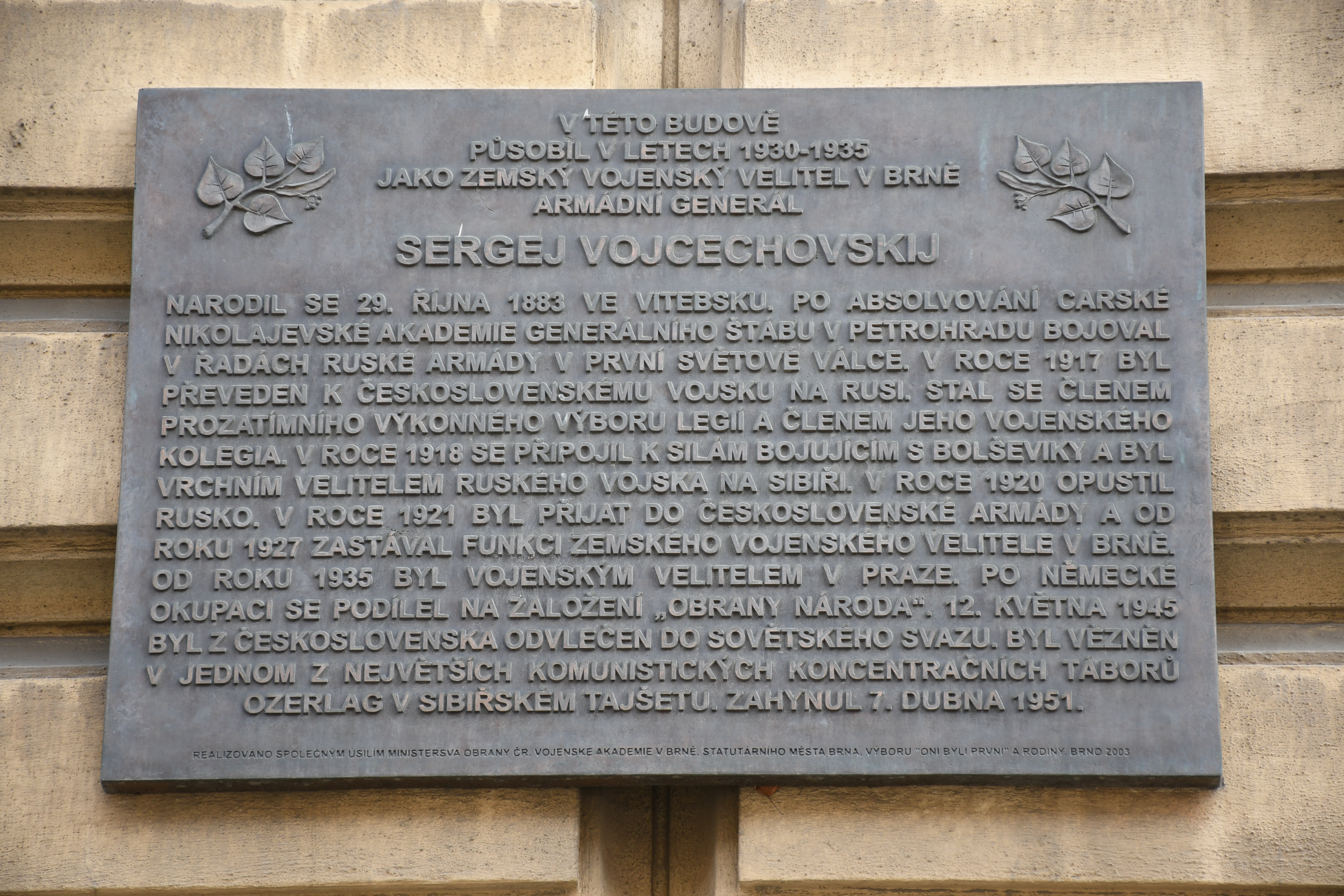
Memorial plaque commemorating General Sergei Vojcechovsky

Slovak communist leader Vlado Clementis complained to Marshal Ivan Konev about the behavior of Soviet troops in Czechoslovakia. Konev's response was to claim it was done mainly by Red Army deserters.

Alongside the liberation, purges carried out by the NKVD and SMERSH also took place, during which persons deemed undesirable by the Soviet Union—free citizens of the liberated states—were sought out and abducted to the Soviet Union. These abductions continued until approximately 1955. One of the most well-known cases is that of the First Czechoslovak Republic legionnaire Sergei Nikolayevich Vojcechovsky, who was arrested by an NKVD unit in Prague on 12 May 1945 and deported to the Soviet Gulag, where he died in 1951. A similar fate befell approximately 500 people from the Czech lands (of whom about 300 perished), and around 6,000 people were abducted from Slovakia. In total, it is estimated that between 60,000 and 120,000 people were abducted from Slovakia. A similar fate also befell persons considered undesirable by the Soviet Union—mostly individuals of Russian origin or children of Russian émigrés—in other states liberated by the Red Army, including German prisoners of war.

=== China ===
During the invasion of Manchuria, Soviet and Mongolian soldiers attacked and raped Japanese civilians, often encouraged by the local Chinese population who were resentful of Japanese rule. The local Chinese population sometimes even joined in these attacks against the Japanese population with the Soviet soldiers. In one famous example, during the Gegenmiao massacre, Soviet soldiers, encouraged by the local Chinese population, raped and massacred over one thousand Japanese women and children. Property of the Japanese were also looted by the Soviet soldiers and Chinese. Many Japanese women married themselves to local Manchurian men to protect themselves from persecution by Soviet soldiers. These Japanese women mostly married Chinese men and became known as "stranded war wives" (zanryu fujin).

Following the invasion of the Japanese puppet state of Manchukuo (Manchuria), the Soviets laid claim to valuable Japanese materials and industrial equipment in the region. A foreigner witnessed Soviet troops, formerly stationed in Berlin, who were allowed by the Soviet military to go at the city "for three days of rape and pillage." Most of Mukden was gone. Convict soldiers were then used to replace them; it was testified that they "stole everything in sight, broke up bathtubs and toilets with hammers, pulled electric-light wiring out of the plaster, built fires on the floor and either burned down the house or at least a big hole in the floor, and in general behaved completely like savages."

According to some British and American sources, the Soviets made it a policy to loot and rape civilians in Manchuria. In Harbin, the Chinese posted slogans such as "Down with Red Imperialism!" Soviet forces faced some protests by Chinese communist party leaders against the looting and rapes committed by troops in Manchuria. There were several instances where Chinese police forces in Manchuria arrested or even killed Soviet troops for various crimes, leading to some conflicts between the Soviet and Chinese authorities in Manchuria.

Japanese women in Manchukuo were repeatedly raped by Russian soldiers every day including underage girls from the families of Japanese who worked for the military and the Manchukuo rail at Beian airport and Japanese military nurses. The Russians seized Japanese civilian girls at Beian airport where there were a total of 1000 Japanese civilians, repeatedly raping 10 girls each day as recalled by Yoshida Reiko and repeatedly raped 75 Japanese nurses at the Sunwu military hospital in Manchukuo during the occupation. The Russians rejected all the pleading by the Japanese officers to stop the rapes. The Japanese were told by the Russians that they had to give their women for rape as war spoils.

Soviet soldiers raped Japanese women from a group of Japanese families that were with Yamada Tami that attempted to flee their settlements on 14 August and go to Mudanjiang. Another group of Japanese women that were with Ikeda Hiroko that on 15 August tried to flee to Harbin but returned to their settlements were raped by Soviet soldiers.

=== Japan ===
On 20 August 1945, Soviet forces carried out fierce naval bombardment and artillery strikes against Japanese defences in Maoka. Nearly 1,000 civilians awaiting evacuation were killed by the invading forces.

During the evacuation of the Kuriles and Karafuto, civilian convoys were attacked by Soviet submarines in the Aniva Gulf. Soviet Leninets-class submarine L-12 and L-19 sank two Japanese refugee transport ships Ogasawara Maru and Taito Maru while also damaging No.2 Shinko Maru on 22 August, 7 days after Hirohito had announced Japan's unconditional surrender. Over 2,400 civilians were killed.

=== Korea ===
During the Soviet occupation of North Korea, it was reported that Soviet soldiers committed rape against both Japanese and Korean women alike in the northern half of the Korean peninsula. Soviet soldiers also looted the property of both Japanese and Koreans living in northern Korea. The Soviets laid claim to Japanese enterprises in Manchuria and northern Korea and took valuable materials and industrial equipment.

North Korean residents initially held high hopes for the Red Army, which had entered their territory as a liberation force, bringing an end to Japanese colonial rule. However, these expectations were quickly shattered. According to eyewitness accounts from the time, Soviet troops engaged in widespread misconduct upon their arrival, looting residents' belongings and committing acts of rape against local women, terrorizing the population. The full extent of the misconduct was revealed to Soviet experts sent to assess North Korea's economic situation in late 1945. The situation was so severe that they reported it directly to the Primorsky Military District.

A report from the Soviet military command at the end of 1945 on the political attitudes of North Korean residents highlited the widespread issue of Soviet soldiers committing rape against local women. According to the report, in September 1945, less than a month after the Soviet army entered Pyongyang, an elderly Korean resident approached the Soviet military command and made the following plea:

Take all of our property, but please do not violate our women. We awaited the Red Army as something sacred, yet among you, there are those who violate our dignity and insult our customs.

It was reported that the Soviet military tolerated the rape of Japanese women residing in North Korea more than that of Korean women. At the time of the Soviet army's entry, approximately 215,000 Japanese civilians were residing in North Korea. As residents of an "occupied territory," Japanese women were openly subjected to mass rape by Soviet soldiers in broad daylight, while assaults on Korean women, considered residents of a "liberated area", were committed more discreetly, often in concealed locations or at night. This phenomenon was seen as similar to Norman Naimark's claim that, in Eastern Europe, Slavic women, such as Polish, Bulgarian, Czech, Slovak, and Serbian women, who were considered "liberated" were relatively spared from rape by Soviet troops compared to non-Slavic women, such as German and Hungarian women, who were considered "occupied."

By October 1945, the frequency and severity of misconduct by Soviet soldiers had significantly decreased, likely due to a direct order issued by Stalin on September 20, 1945, to the authorities of the Soviet 25th Army stationed in North Korea, including the commander of the Far Eastern Front. Issued about a month after the Soviet Army's entry into North Korea, the order's sixth provision stated: "The military in North Korea must strictly observe discipline, avoid harming residents, and behave courteously." As a result, stricter enforcement by the Soviet military command led to a noticeable decline in misconduct by Soviet soldiers in the following month.

Crackdowns on misconduct by Soviet soldiers reportedly intensified from early 1946, and measures taken by the Soviet military command contributed to a reduction in such incidents. Jeong Ryul, a Koryoin Soviet officer and interpreter for Ivan Chistyakov, testified that in January 1946, Stalin issued a secret directive to the Soviet Civil Administration ordering the immediate execution of soldiers who harmed the North Korean population. He stated that in Wonsan, ten Soviet soldiers charged with robbery and rape were shot, and a similar number were also executed in Hamhung. According to Bruce Cumings, a report from the United States Army Military Government in Korea stated that "by January 1946, the Soviet Union had introduced military police to enforce strict control over its soldiers." However, looting and violence by Soviet soldiers were only relatively reduced, not completely eradicated. According to a Japanese resident in Namsi, North Pyongan Province, rapes by Soviet soldiers began occurring in late October, with sexual violence against Japanese women becoming particularly severe. In response, some North Korean security forces reportedly evacuated Japanese women to the mountains or local Korean homes for protection. Soviet soldiers who had exhausted their military currency freely engaged in looting.

Officers also committed offenses and were arrested as a result. For example, between May 13 and May 25, 1946, a total of 229 Soviet soldiers were arrested in Haeju, Hwanghae Province, including six officers. Despite several official measures and arbitrary attempts to enforce discipline, misconduct, including assault, harassment, looting, and murder, by both Soviet soldiers and officers continued until the end of 1946.

=== Treatment of prisoners of war ===
Although the Soviet Union had not formally signed the Hague Convention, it declared itself bound by the convention's provisions as well as by its own "Regulations for the Treatment of PoWs". However, in practice, it often ignored the convention as well as its own rules. George Sanford wrote that Soviet public declarations and laws on the humane treatment of PoWs were "part of the Soviet 'big lie' for propaganda". One of the Soviet Union's earliest war crimes were those against Polish prisoners of war in the aftermath of the Soviet invasion of Poland in the 1939; it is estimated that during that conflict, approximately 2,500 Polish soldiers were murdered in various executions and reprisals for offering resistance by Soviets and Ukrainian nationalists. The most infamous of these was the Katyn massacre, a series of mass executions of nearly 22,000 Polish military officers and intelligentsia carried out by the Soviet Union, specifically the NKVD in April and May 1940. Though the killings took place at several places, the massacre is named after the Katyn Forest, where some of the mass graves were first discovered.

Throughout the Second World War, the Wehrmacht War Crimes Bureau collected and investigated reports of crimes against the Axis POWs. According to Cuban-American writer Alfred de Zayas, "For the entire duration of the Russian campaign, reports of torture and murder of German prisoners did not cease. The War Crimes Bureau had five major sources of information: (1) captured enemy papers, especially orders, reports of operations, and propaganda leaflets; (2) intercepted radio and wireless messages; (3) testimony of Soviet prisoners of war; (4) testimony of captured Germans who had escaped; and (5) testimony of Germans who saw the corpses or mutilated bodies of executed prisoners of war. From 1941 to 1945 the Bureau compiled several thousand depositions, reports, and captured papers which, if nothing else, indicate that the killing of German prisoners of war upon capture or shortly after their interrogation was not an isolated occurrence. Documents relating to the war in France, Italy, and North Africa contain some reports on the deliberate killing of German prisoners of war, but there can be no comparison with the events on the Eastern Front."

In a November 1941 report, the Wehrmacht War Crimes Bureau accused the Red Army of employing "a terror policy... against defenseless German soldiers that have fallen into its hands and against members of the German medical corps. At the same time... it has made use of the following means of camouflage: in a Red Army order that bears the approval of the Council of People's Commissars, dated 1 July 1941, the norms of international law are made public, which the Red Army in the spirit of the Hague Regulations on Land Warfare are supposed to follow... This... Russian order probably had very little distribution, and surely it has not been followed at all. Otherwise the unspeakable crimes would not have occurred."

According to the depositions, Soviet massacres of German, Italian, Spanish, and other Axis POWs were often incited by unit Commissars, who claimed to be acting under orders from Stalin and the Politburo. Other evidence cemented the War Crimes Bureau's belief that Stalin had given secret orders about the massacre of POWs.

During the winter of 1941–42, the Red Army captured approximately 10,000 German soldiers each month, but the death rate became so high that the absolute number of prisoners decreased (or was bureaucratically reduced).

Soviet sources list the deaths of 474,967 of the 2,652,672 German Armed Forces taken prisoner in the war. Dr. Rüdiger Overmans believes that it seems entirely plausible, while not provable, that additional German military personnel listed as missing actually died in Soviet custody as POWs, putting the estimates of the actual death toll of German POW in the USSR at about 1.0 million.

==== Massacre of Feodosia ====
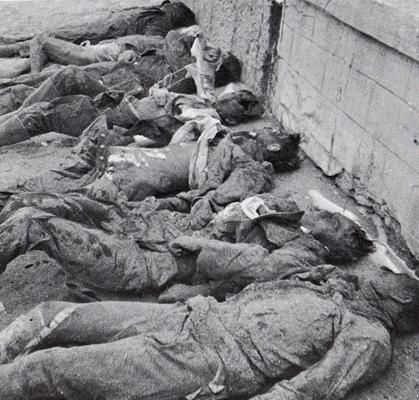
Corpses from the Massacre of Feodosia in front of the main hospital on the coast

Soviet soldiers rarely bothered to treat wounded German POWs. A particularly infamous example took place after the Crimean city of Feodosia was briefly recaptured by Soviet forces on 29 December 1942. 160 wounded soldiers had been left in military hospitals by the retreating Wehrmacht. After the Germans retook Feodosia, it was learned that every wounded soldier had been massacred by Red Army, Navy, and NKVD personnel. Some had been shot in their hospital beds, others repeatedly bludgeoned to death, still others were found to have been thrown from hospital windows before being repeatedly drenched with freezing water until they died of hypothermia.

==== Massacre of Grishchino ====
The Massacre of Grischino was committed by an armoured division of the Red Army in February 1943 in the eastern Ukrainian towns of Krasnoarmeyskoye, Postyschevo and Grischino. The Wehrmacht Untersuchungsstelle also known as WuSt (Wehrmacht criminal investigating authority), announced that among the victims were 406 soldiers of the Wehrmacht, 58 members of the Organisation Todt (including two Danish nationals), 89 Italian soldiers, 9 Romanian soldiers, 4 Hungarian soldiers, 15 German civil officials, 7 German civilian workers and 8 Ukrainian volunteers.

The places were overrun by the Soviet 4th Guards Tank Corps on the night of 10 and 11 February 1943. After the reconquest by the 5th SS Panzer Division Wiking with the support of 333 Infantry Division and the 7th Panzer Division on 18 February 1943 the Wehrmacht soldiers discovered numerous deaths. Many of the bodies were horribly mutilated, ears and noses cut off and genital organs amputated and stuffed into their mouths. Breasts of some of the nurses were cut off, the women being brutally raped. A German military judge who was at the scene stated in an interview during the 1970s that he saw a female body with her legs spread-eagled and a broomstick rammed into her genitals. In the cellar of the main train station around 120 Germans were herded into a large storage room and then mowed down with machine guns.

==== Postwar ====
Some German prisoners were released soon after the war. Many others, however, remained in the GULAG long after the surrender of Nazi Germany. Among the most famous German POWs to die in Soviet captivity was Captain Wilm Hosenfeld, who died of injuries, sustained possibly under torture, in a concentration camp near Stalingrad in 1952. In 2009, Captain Hosenfeld was posthumously honored by the State of Israel for his role in saving Jewish lives during The Holocaust. Similar was the fate of Swedish diplomat and OSS operative Raoul Wallenberg.

== After World War II ==
=== Hungarian Revolution (1956) ===
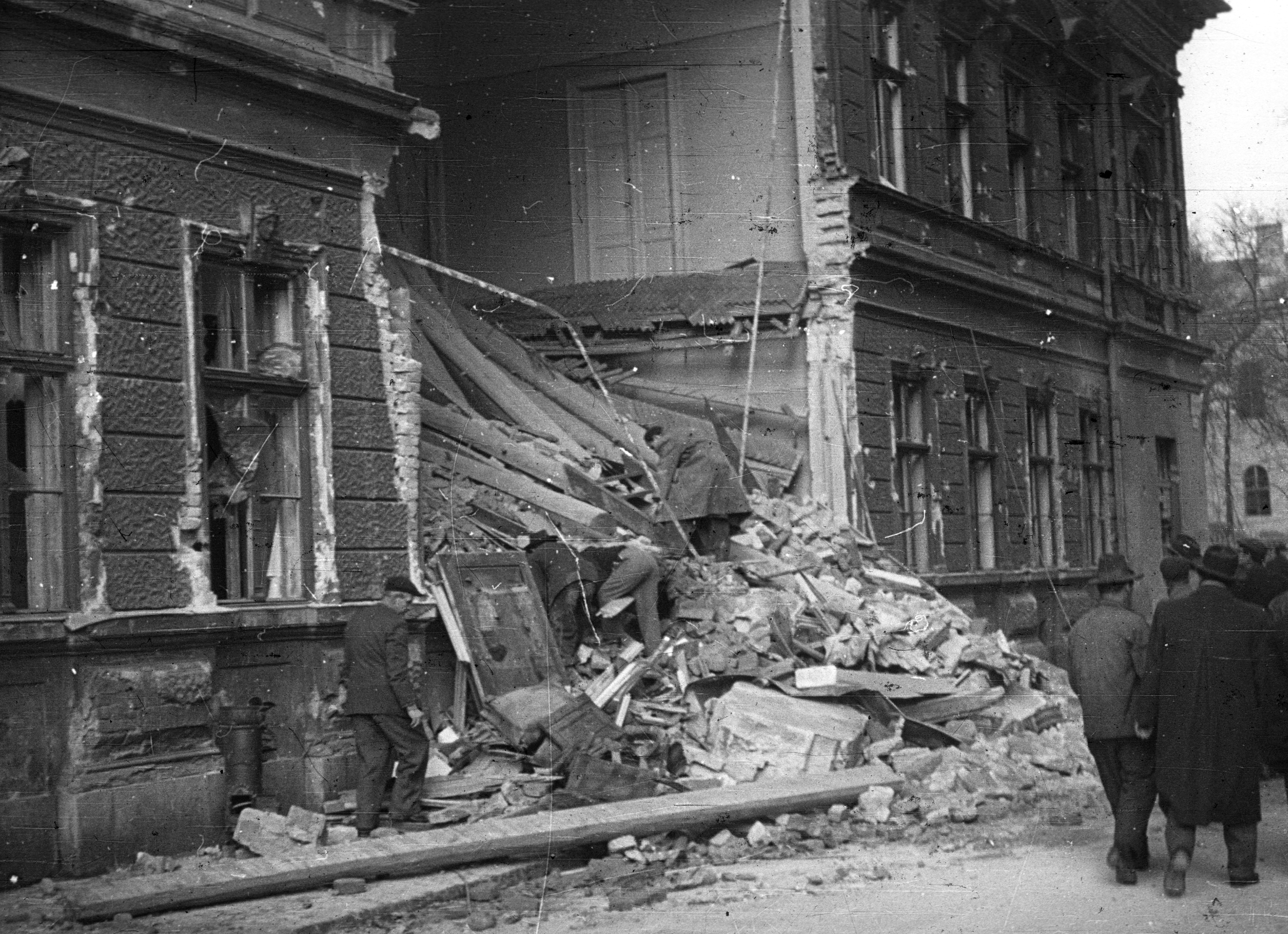
An apartment destroyed in Budapest during the Soviet invasion in 1956

According to the United Nations Report of the Special Committee on the problem of Hungary (1957): "Soviet tanks fired indiscriminately at every building from which they believed themselves to be under fire." The UN commission received numerous reports of Soviet mortar and artillery fire into inhabited quarters in the Buda section of the city, despite no return fire, and of "haphazard shooting at defenseless passers-by."

=== Afghanistan (1979–1989) ===
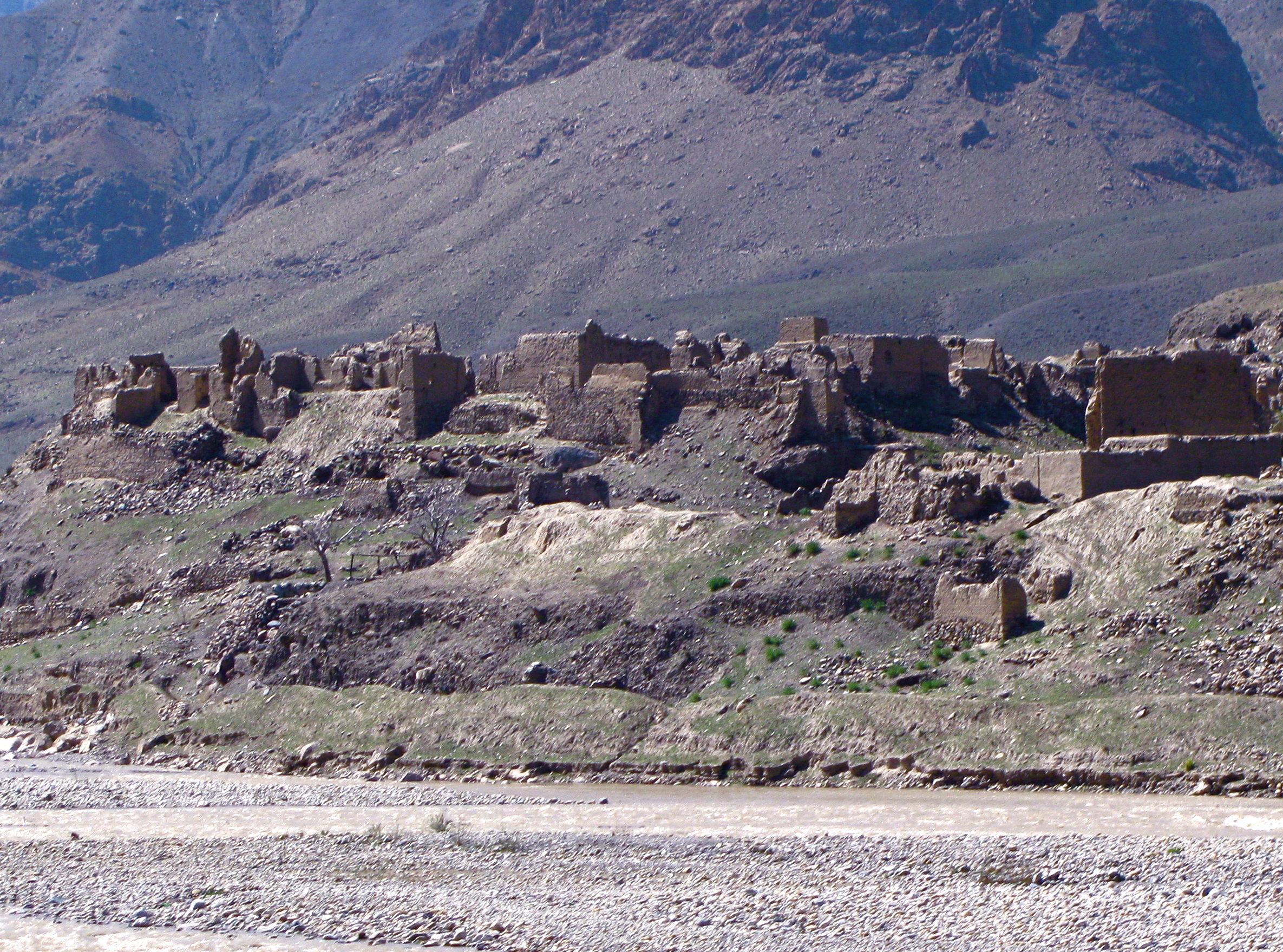
An Afghan village destroyed by the Soviets in the 1980s

Scholars Mohammad Kakar, W. Michael Reisman and Charles Norchi believe that the Soviet Union was guilty of committing a genocide in Afghanistan. The army of the Soviet Union killed large numbers of Afghans to suppress their resistance. Up to 2 million Afghans were killed during the war, many of them by Soviet forces and their Afghan allies. In one notable incident the Soviet Army committed mass killing of civilians in the summer of 1980. One notable war crime was the Laghman massacre in April 1985 in the villages of Kas-Aziz-Khan, Charbagh, Bala Bagh, Sabzabad, Mamdrawer, Haider Khan and Pul-i-Joghi in the Laghman Province. At least 500 civilians were killed. In the Kulchabat, Bala Karz and Mushkizi massacre on 12 October 1983, the Red Army gathered 360 people at the village square and shot them, including 20 girls and over a dozen older people. The Rauzdi massacre and Padkhwab-e Shana massacre were also documented.

In order to separate the mujahideen from the local populations and eliminate their support, the Soviet army killed and drove off civilians, and used scorched earth tactics to prevent their return. They used booby traps, mines, and chemical substances throughout the country. The Soviet army indiscriminately killed combatants and noncombatants to ensure submission by the local populations. The provinces of Nangarhar, Ghazni, Lagham, Kunar, Zabul, Qandahar, Badakhshan, Lowgar, Paktia and Paktika witnessed extensive depopulation programmes by the Soviet forces. The Soviet forces abducted Afghan women in helicopters while flying in the country in search of mujahideen. In November 1980, a number of such incidents had taken place in various parts of the country, including Laghman and Kama. Soviet soldiers as well as KhAD agents kidnapped young women from the city of Kabul and the areas of Darul Aman and Khair Khana, near the Soviet garrisons, to rape them. Women who were taken and raped by soldiers were considered 'dishonoured' by their families if they returned home. Deserters from the Soviet Army in 1984 claimed that they had heard of Afghan women being raped. The rape of Afghan women by Soviet troops was common and 11.8 percent of the Soviet war criminals in Afghanistan were convicted for the offence of rape. There was an outcry against the press in the Soviet Union for depicting the Soviet "war heroes" as "murderers", "aggressors", "rapists" and "junkies".

=== Pressure in Azerbaijan (1988–1991) ===
Black January (Azerbaijani: Qara Yanvar), also known as Black Saturday or the January Massacre, was a violent crackdown in Baku on 19–20 January 1990, pursuant to a state of emergency during the dissolution of the Soviet Union.

In a resolution of 22 January 1990, the Supreme Soviet of Azerbaijan SSR declared that the decree of the Presidium of the Supreme Soviet of the USSR of 19 January, used to impose emergency rule in Baku and military deployment, constituted an act of aggression. Black January is associated with the rebirth of the Azerbaijan Republic. It was one of the occasions during the glasnost and perestroika era in which the USSR used force against dissidents.

According to official estimates of Azerbaijan, 147 civilians were killed, 800 people were injured, and five people went missing.

== War crimes trials and legal prosecution ==
In 1995, Latvian courts sentenced former KGB officer Alfons Noviks to life in prison for genocide due to forced deportations in the 1940s.

In 2003, August Kolk (born 1924), an Estonian national, and Petr Kislyiy (born 1921), a Russian national, were convicted of crimes against humanity by Estonian courts and each sentenced to eight years in prison. They were found guilty of deportations of Estonians in 1949. Kolk and Kislyiy lodged a complaint at the European Court of Human Rights, alleging that the Criminal Code of 1946 of the Russian Soviet Federative Socialist Republic (RSFSR) was valid at the time, applicable also in Estonia, and that the said Code had not provided for punishment of crimes against humanity. Their appeal was rejected since the court found that Resolution 95 of the United Nations General Assembly, adopted on 11 December 1946, confirmed deportations of civilians as a crime against humanity under international law.

In 2004, Vassili Kononov, a Soviet partisan during World War II, was convicted by Supreme Court of Latvia as a war criminal for killing three women, one of whom was pregnant. He is the only former Soviet partisan convicted of crimes against humanity. The sentence was condemned by various high-ranking Russian officials.

On 27 March 2019, Lithuania convicted 67 former Soviet military and KGB officials who were given sentences of between four and 14 years for the crackdown against Lithuanian civilians in January 1991. Only two were present—Yuriy Mel, a former Soviet tank officer, and Gennady Ivanov, a former Soviet munitions officer—while the others were sentenced in absentia as they were living in Russia.

== In popular culture ==
=== Film ===
- Äratus (1989), depicts Operation Priboi, the mass deportation of Estonians, Lithuanians and Latvians.
- Ashes in the Snow (2018) depicts a coming-of-age story set amongst the backdrop of the 1941 Soviet deportations from Lithuania, based on the novel Between Shades of Gray by Ruta Sepetys, which in turn was based on the real life story of Irena Spakauskiene, a 13-year-old Lithuanian girl deported to Siberia.
- A Woman in Berlin (2008) depicts the mass sexual assaults committed by Soviet soldiers in the Soviet zone of occupied Germany. It is based on the diary of Marta Hillers.
- Admiral (2008), a film set during the Russian Civil War, depicts Red soldiers and sailors committing numerous massacres of former members of the Imperial Russian Navy's officer corps.
- The Beast (1988), a film set during the Soviet–Afghan War, depicts Soviet Army war crimes against civilian noncombatants and a Pashtun clan's quest for revenge.
- Charlie Wilson's War (2007), set during the Soviet–Afghan War, accuses the Soviet state of systematic genocide against Afghan civilians. It is mentioned that Soviet forces are leaving no one alive and are even slaughtering livestock in order to starve the Afghan people into submission.
- The Chronicles of Melanie (2016), about the Soviet occupation of Latvia in 1940 and subsequent deportations, based on the real life of deported writer Melānija Vanaga.
- In the Crosswind (2014), depicting an Estonian family deported to Siberia, based on a real story.
- Haytarma (2013), depicting the life of Crimean Tatar flying ace Amet-khan Sultan during the background of the 1944 deportation of the Crimean Tatars.
- The Innocents (2016), depicting the sexual assault of Polish nuns in the post World War II period.
- Katyń (2007), depicts the Katyn massacre through the eyes of its victims and the decades long battle by their families to learn the truth.
- Ordered to Forget (2014), depicts the 1944 Khaibakh massacre of Chechens, as well as the deportations of the Chechens and Ingush. The film was released to mark the 70th anniversary of the deportations, and was banned by Russia for being a "historical falsification".
- Red Scorpion (1988), a film with Dolph Lundgren, set in Africa, depicts Soviet war criminals killing civilians with flamethrowers.

=== Literature ===
- Prussian Nights (1974) a war poem by Aleksandr Solzhenitsyn. The narrator, a Red Army officer, approves of the troops' crimes as revenge for Nazi atrocities in Russia, and hopes to take part in the plundering himself. The poem describes the gang-rape of a Polish woman whom the Red Army soldiers had mistaken for a German. According to a review for The New York Times, Solzhenitsyn wrote the poem in trochaic tetrameter, "in imitation of, and argument with the most famous Russian war poem, Aleksandr Tvardovsky's Vasili Tyorkin."
- Apricot Jam and Other Stories (2010) by Aleksandr Solzhenitsyn. In a short story about Marshal Georgii Zhukov's futile attempts at writing his memoirs, the retired Marshal reminisces about serving against the peasant uprising in Tambov Province. He recalls Mikhail Tukhachevsky's arrival to take command of the campaign and his first address to his men. He announced that total war and scorched earth tactics are to be used against civilians who assist or even sympathize with the peasant rebels. Zhukov proudly recalls how Tukhachevsky's tactics were adopted and succeeded in breaking the uprising. In the process, however, they virtually depopulated the surrounding countryside.
- A Man Without Breath (2013) by Philip Kerr. A 1993 Bernie Gunther thriller which delves into the Wehrmacht War Crimes Bureau's investigations of Soviet war crimes. Kerr noted in his Afterward that the Wehrmacht War Crimes Bureau continued to exist until 1945. It has been written about in the book of the same name by Alfred M. de Zayas, published by the University of Nebraska Press in 1989.

=== Art ===
- On 12 October 2013 a then 26-year-old Polish art student, Jerzy Bohdan Szumczyk, erected a movable statue next to the Soviet World War II memorial in the Polish city of Gdańsk. The statue depicted a Soviet soldier attempting to rape a pregnant woman; pulling her hair with one hand whilst pushing a pistol into her mouth. Authorities removed the artwork because it had been erected without an official permit, but there was widespread interest in many online publications. The act promoted an angry reaction from the Russian ambassador in Poland.

== See also ==
- Allied war crimes during World War II
- Anti-communist mass killings
- Antisemitism in the Soviet Union
- Destruction battalions
- Evacuation of East Prussia
- Excess mortality in the Soviet Union under Joseph Stalin
- Forced labor of Germans in the Soviet Union
- German war crimes
- Human rights in the Soviet Union
- Italian war crimes
- Japanese POWs in the Soviet Union
- Japanese war crimes
- List of massacres in the Soviet Union
- List of Soviet Union perpetrated war crimes
- Mass graves in the Soviet Union
- Mass operations of the NKVD
- Military history of the Soviet Union
- Military occupations by the Soviet Union
- Nemmersdorf massacre
- NKVD prisoner massacres
- Operation Frühlingserwachen
- Population transfer in the Soviet Union
- Racism in the Soviet Union
- Red Terror
- Russian war crimes
- Soviet plunder
- United States war crimes
- War crimes and atrocities of the Waffen-SS
- War crimes of the Wehrmacht

== Sources ==
- Beevor, Antony, Berlin: The Downfall 1945, Penguin Books, 2002, ISBN 0-670-88695-5
- Bergstrom, Christer (2007). Barbarossa – The Air Battle: July–December 1941. London: Chevron/Ian Allan. ISBN 978-1-85780-270-2.
- Brauer, Birgit (2010). "Chechens and the survival of their cultural identity in exile". Journal of Genocide Research. 4 (3): 387–400. doi:10.1080/14623520220151970. S2CID 72355205.
- Buckley, Cynthia J.; Ruble, Blair A.; Hofmann, Erin Trouth (2008). Migration, Homeland, and Belonging in Eurasia. Woodrow Wilson Center Press. p. 207. ISBN 978-0-8018-9075-8. LCCN 2008-015571.
- Bugay, Nikolay (1996). The Deportation of Peoples in the Soviet Union. New York City: Nova Publishers. ISBN 978-1-56072-371-4. OCLC 36402865.
- Burds, Jeffrey (2007). "The Soviet War against 'Fifth Columnists': The Case of Chechnya, 1942–4". Journal of Contemporary History. 42 (2): 267–314. doi:10.1177/0022009407075545. S2CID 159523593.
- de Zayas, Alfred-Maurice, The Wehrmacht War Crimes Bureau, 1939–1945 (in Wikipedia). Preface by Professor Howard Levie. Lincoln: University of Nebraska Press, 1989. ISBN 0-8032-9908-7. New revised edition with Picton Press, Rockland, Maine, ISBN 0-89725-421-X.
- de Zayas, Alfred-Maurice, A Terrible Revenge. The Ethnic Cleansing of the East European Germans, 1944–1950, St. Martin's Press, New York, 1994, ISBN 0-312-12159-8
- Dunlop, John B. (1998). Russia Confronts Chechnya: Roots of a Separatist Conflict. Cambridge: Cambridge University Press. ISBN 978-0-521-63619-3. LCCN 97051840.
- Dushnyck, Walter (1975). "Discrimination and Abuse of Power in the USSR". In Veenhoven, Willem Adriaan (ed.). Case Studies on Human Rights and Fundamental Freedoms Volume Two: A World Survey. Martinus Nijhoff Publishers. p. 503. ISBN 9789024717811. LCCN 76352642.
- Fowkes, Ben, ed. (1998). Russia and Chechnia: The Permanent Crisis: Essays on Russo-Chechen Relations. Palgrave Macmillan UK. ISBN 978-1-349-26351-6. LCCN 97037269.
- Hall, Steve and Lionel Quinlan (2000). KG55: Greif Geshwader. Walton on Thames: Red Kite. ISBN 0-9538061-0-3
- Gammer, Moshe (2006). The Lone Wolf and the Bear: Three Centuries of Chechen Defiance of Russian Rule. C. Hurst & Co. Publishers. ISBN 978-1-85065-748-4.
- Gessen, Masha (2015). The Brothers: The Road to an American Tragedy. Penguin. p. 18. ISBN 978-1-59463-264-8. LCCN 2015295427.
- Hasting, Max, Armageddon: The Battle for Germany, 1944–1945, Chapter 10: Blood and Ice: East Prussia ISBN 0-375-41433-9
- Hillers, Marta, A Woman in Berlin: Six Weeks in the Conquered City Translated by Anthes Bell, ISBN 0-8050-7540-2
- Fisch, Bernhard, Nemmersdorf, Oktober 1944. Was in Ostpreußen tatsächlich geschah. Berlin: 1997. ISBN 3-932180-26-7.
- Lee, Philip; Thomas, Pradip, eds. (2012). Public Memory, Public Media and the Politics of Justice. Springer. p. 185. ISBN 978-1-137-26517-3. LCCN 2012023556.
- Marshall, Alex (2010). The Caucasus Under Soviet Rule. Routledge. ISBN 978-1-136-93825-2. LCCN 2010003007.
- Mawdsley, Evan (1998). The Stalin Years: The Soviet Union, 1929–1953. Manchester University Press. ISBN 978-0-7190-4600-1. LCCN 2003046365.
- Merridale, Catherine, Ivan's War, the Red Army 1939–1945, London: Faber and Faber, 2005, ISBN 0-571-21808-3
- Naimark, Norman M., The Russians in Germany: A History of the Soviet Zone of Occupation, 1945–1949. Harvard University Press, 1995. ISBN 0-674-78405-7
- Pokalova, Elena (2015). Chechnya's Terrorist Network: The Evolution of Terrorism in Russia's North Caucasus. ABC-CLIO. p. 16. ISBN 978-1-4408-3155-3. LCCN 2014038634.
- Richmond, Walter (2008). The Northwest Caucasus: Past, Present, Future. Routledge. p. 117. ISBN 978-0-415-77615-8. LCCN 2008001048.
- Tishkov, Valery (2004). Chechnya: Life in a War-Torn Society. Vol. 6. Berkeley: University of California Press. p. 33. ISBN 978-0-520-93020-9. LCCN 2003017330.
- Toland, John, The Last 100 Days, Chapter Two: Five Minutes before Midnight ISBN 0-8129-6859-X
- Voutira, Eftihia (2011). The 'Right to Return' and the Meaning of 'Home': A Post-Soviet Greek Diaspora Becoming European?. Zürich: LIT Verlag Münster. ISBN 978-3-643-90107-1. OCLC 777781352.
- Walter, Elizabeth B., Barefoot in the Rubble 1997, ISBN 0-9657793-0-0
- Werth, Nicholas (2008). "The Crimes of the Stalin Regime: Outline for an Inventory and Classification". In Stone, Dan (ed.). The Historiography of Genocide (repeated ed.). Basingstoke: Palgrave Macmillan. p. 412. ISBN 978-0-230-29778-4. LCCN 2007048561.
- Wood, Tony (2007). Chechnya: The Case for Independence. New York, London: Verso Books. ISBN 978-1-84467-114-4. LCCN 2007273825.
