= Jawak =

- Village
- Location in Afghanistan
- Coordinates: 35°18′39″N 66°1′32″E
- Country: Afghanistan
- Province: Sar-e Pol Province
- District: Kohistanat District
- Time zone: + 4.30

Jawak is a village in Kohistanat District in Sar-e Pol Province, in northern Afghanistan. It was formerly in Jowzjan Province.

== See also ==
- Sar-e Pol Province
