= Erna =

Erna may refer to:

== People ==
- Erna (given name), a list of people with the name
- Jeff Erna, American drummer
- Sully Erna (born 1968), American musician and member of Godsmack
- pen name of Anna van Gogh-Kaulbach (1869-1960), Dutch writer
- Érna, or Iverni, a people of medieval Ireland

== Other uses ==
- Erna (mythology), a figure in Norse mythology
- Erna (moth), genus of moths in the family Erebidae
- Little Erna, the butt of Little Erna jokes popular in Hamburg
- Erna (planet), a fictional world in C. S. Friedman's Coldfire Trilogy
- Erna long-range reconnaissance group, a Finnish Army unit of Estonian volunteers which operated behind Red Army lines in World War II
- Erna Raid, a former military exercise held annually in Estonia
- Erna, Texas, United States, an unincorporated community
- 406 Erna, a main belt asteroid
- Enhancer RNAs
- Environmental RNA
- SS Erna, a German coaster in service 1922-46

== See also ==
- Urna (disambiguation)
