= Summer War =

1941 battle of World War II during the Operation Barbarossa

- Part of Eastern Front (World War II) and Occupation of the Baltic States
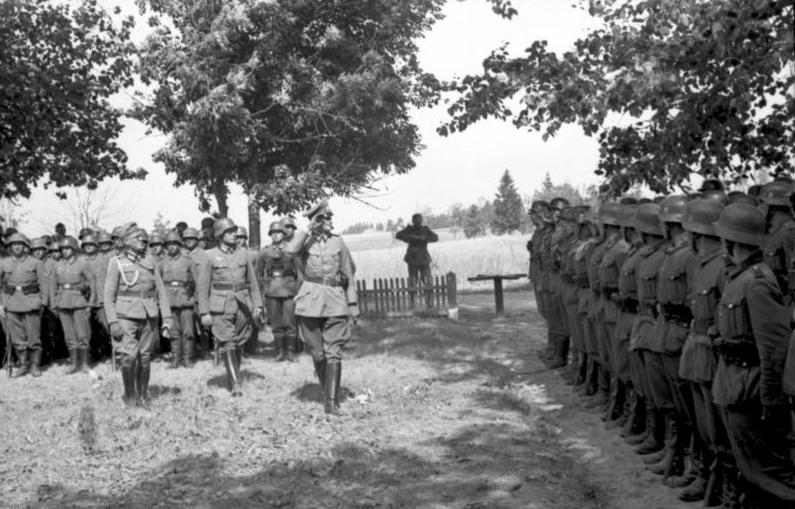
- German soldiers lined up in Estonia in August, 1941
Date	3 July – 21 October 1941 (3 months, 2 weeks and 4 days)
Location	Estonia
Result	Estonian-German victory
Territorial changes	Occupation of Estonia by Nazi Germany

Belligerents
(Estonia) Estonian Forest Brothers (Estonia) Omakaitse; Germany; Finland	Soviet Union

Commanders and leaders
(Nazi Germany) Georg von Küchler (Estonia) Friedrich Kurg	(Soviet Union) Kliment Voroshilov (Soviet Union) Vladimir Tributs

The Summer War (Estonian: Suvesõda) was the occupation of Estonia during the Second World War. It was fought between the Forest Brothers (Metsavennad), the Omakaitse, and the German 18th Army against the forces of the Soviet 8th Army and the NKVD.

== Background ==
On June 17, 1940, the USSR occupied Estonia and on August 6, Estonia became a Soviet Socialist Republic. Estonian civilians and potential Soviet opponents were repressed and sent to prison camps and settlements in the Soviet Union during the June deportation of 1941. Over 10,000 men, women, and children were deported to the Soviet Union, including 400 Estonian Jews.

== Invasion ==
When Nazi Germany launched Operation Barbarossa and invaded the Soviet Union on June 22, 1941, some Estonians hoped that the Germans would liberate the Baltics from Soviet rule. The Army Group North, led by Field Marshal Wilhelm Ritter von Leeb, invaded Estonia in July of 1941. Northern Estonia was the last to be occupied by the German forces. Around 12,000 partisans of the Estonian Forest Brothers attacked the NKVD forces and the Soviet 8th Army. After the German 18th Army crossed the Estonian southern border on July 7–9, the Forest Brothers organized bigger units. They took on the Soviet 8th Army units and destruction battalions at Antsla on 5 July 1941.

=== Liberation of territory ===
On July 6, 1941, a larger offensive happened in Vastseliina where the Forest Brothers prevented Soviet destruction of the town and trapped the extermination battalion chiefs and local communist administrators. On July 7, the Forest Brothers were able to hoist the Estonian flag in Vasteliina. Võru was subsequently liberated and the Forest Brothers reorganised into the Omakaitse militia.

The battle of Tartu lasted for two weeks and destroyed a large part of the city. Under the leadership of Friedrich Kurg, the Forest Brothers drove the Soviets out, behind the Pärnu River – Emajõgi River line and secured southern Estonia by July 10. The NKVD murdered 193 people in a Tartu Prison on their retreat on July 8.

The 18th Army resumed their advance in Estonia by collaborating with the Forest Brothers. The joint Estonian-German forces took Narva on 17 August.

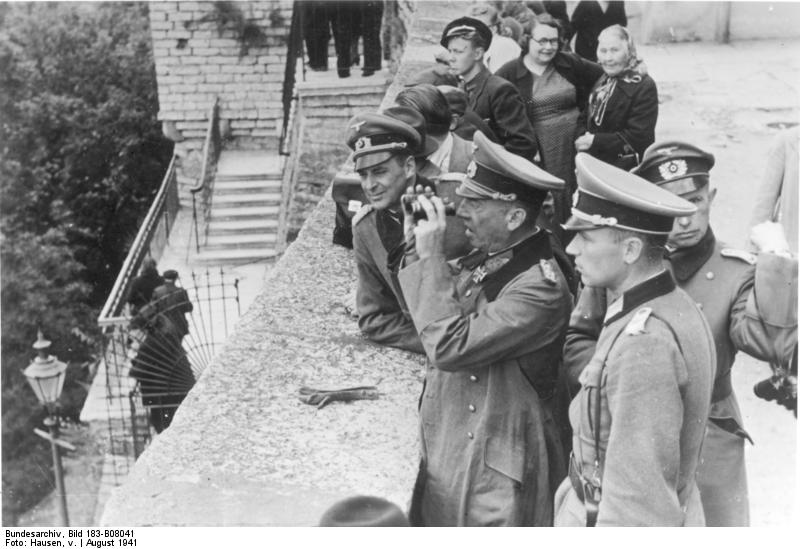
Georg von Küchler in Tallinn in August 1941

=== Kautla Massacre ===
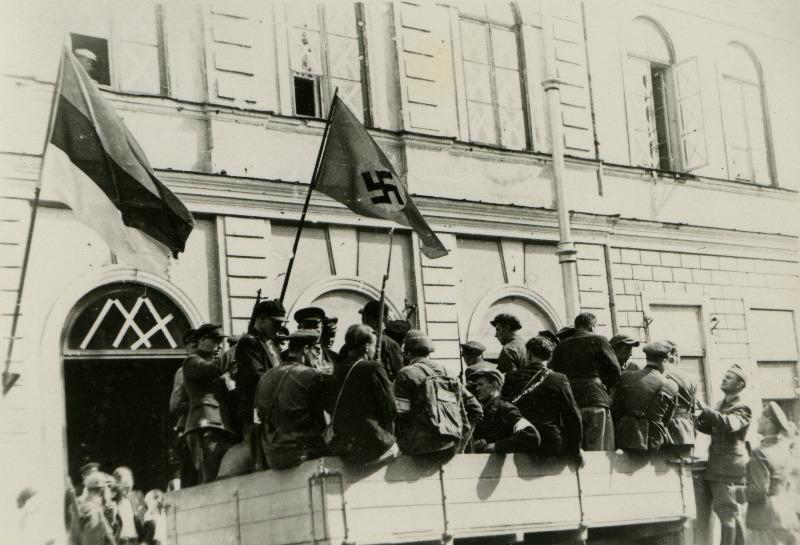
Omakaitse in Pärnu, 8 July 1941

During the Battle of Kautla of 24 July, 1941, twenty civilians were murdered by destruction battalion troops and many were tortured before they were killed. The proportion of destroyed properties to murdered civilians was because the Finnish volunteer group commanded by Henn-Ants Kurg named the Erna long-range reconnaissance broke the Red Army's blockade and evacuated civilians.

=== Mass killings by Einsatzgruppe A ===
Sonderkommando 1a, commanded by Martin Sandberger, entered Estonia soon after the start of the German invasion and began to exterminate Jews, Estonian Roma, and other Estonian civilians. This was done in collaboration with the Omakaitse and Estonian police and began in July of 1941. Following the entry of German troops into Estonia, about 75% of Estonian Jews had fled to the USSR by August of 1941. Nearly all of the 950 to 1000 Jews who did not flee were murdered by the end of 1941, with less than a dozen confirmed to have survived the war.

=== Capture of Tallinn ===
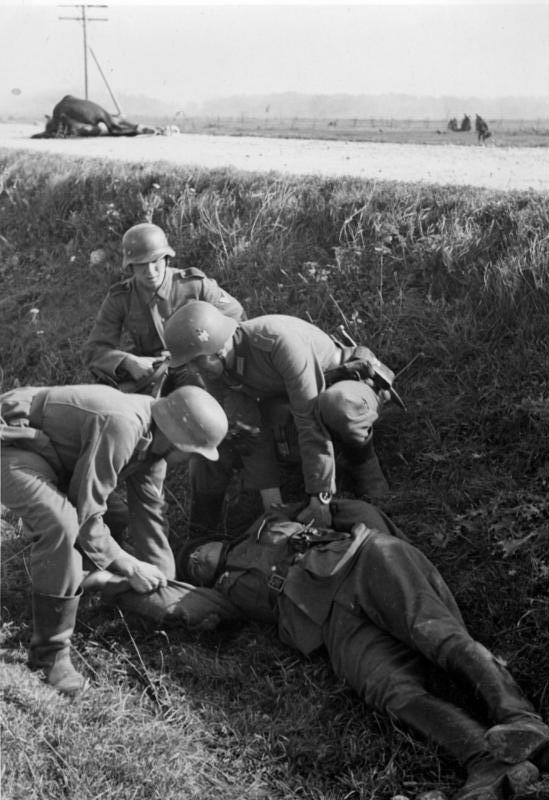
German soldiers in the battle of Saaremaa

By the end of August, Tallinn was surrounded, while in the harbor was the majority of USSR's Baltic Fleet. On August 19, the final German assault on Tallinn began. The joint Estonian-German forces took the city on August 28. The Soviet evacuation of Tallinn suffered heavy losses. On that day, the Soviet flag was taken down on Pikk Hermann and was replaced with the flag of Estonia. After the Soviet troops were driven out from Estonia, German troops disarmed the Forest Brother groups. The Estonian flag was replaced shortly with the flag of Germany.

=== Operation Beowulf ===
On September 8, German and Estonian units launched Operation Beowulf to clear Soviet forces from the West Estonian archipelago. They launched a series of diversionary attacks to confuse and distract the Soviet defenders. By October 21, the islands were captured.

== Costs of the war ==
=== Civilian casualties ===
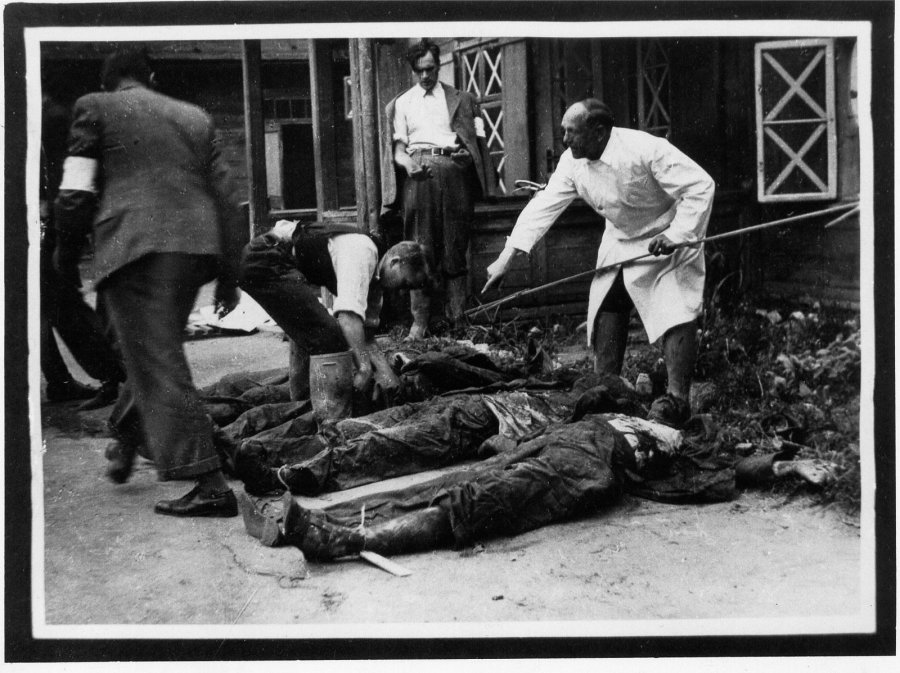
Victims of Soviet NKVD in Tartu, Estonia, 1941

Alongside the battle against the partisan group and the Soviet forces and the reintroduction of the scorched earth policy, the NKVD committed acts of terror against the civilian population, burning buildings, because their occupants were seen as co-conspirators. Thousands of other civilians were killed, while many towns, schools, services, and other buildings were torched. In August 1941, the whole population of Viru-Kabala were killed, including a six-day-old infant and a two-year-old child. The Soviet destruction battalions also occasionally burned people alive. Overall, the battalions killed 1,850 partisans or unarmed civilians.

German troops and their Estonian collaborators also perpetrated the murder of Estonian civilians, including Jews, Roma, ethnic Estonians accused of having communist communist sympathies, and their families.

=== Physical damage ===
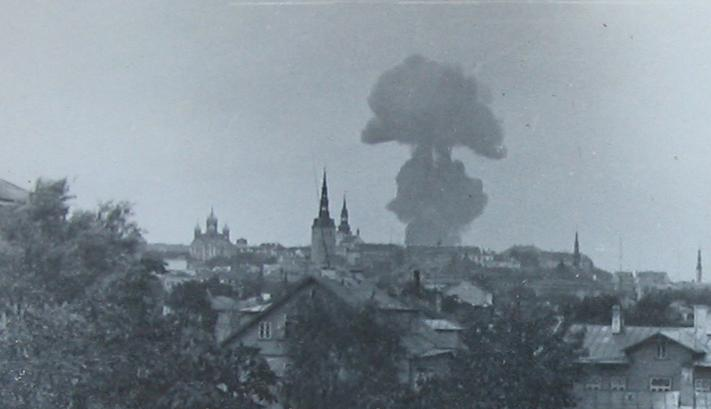
Mushroom cloud seen from Tallinn, 1941

During the fires of July 12-13, the headquarters of the Estonian Defence League, the campus of the Faculty of Veterinary and Agriculture of the University of Tartu and other university buildings were burnt down. Several libraries of the university and 135 major private libraries were destroyed, totalling 465,000 books, many archive materials and 2,500 pieces of art. Among them were the libraries of Aino and Gustav Suits and Aurora and Johannes Semper. In total, 3,237 farms and 13,500 buildings were destroyed. By 1942, the population of various farm animals decreased from numbers in 1939: horses by 14%, dairy cattle by 34%, pigs by 50%, sheep by 46%, and fowl by 27.5%.

Many supplies were looted for use in the Soviet Union.

== Result ==
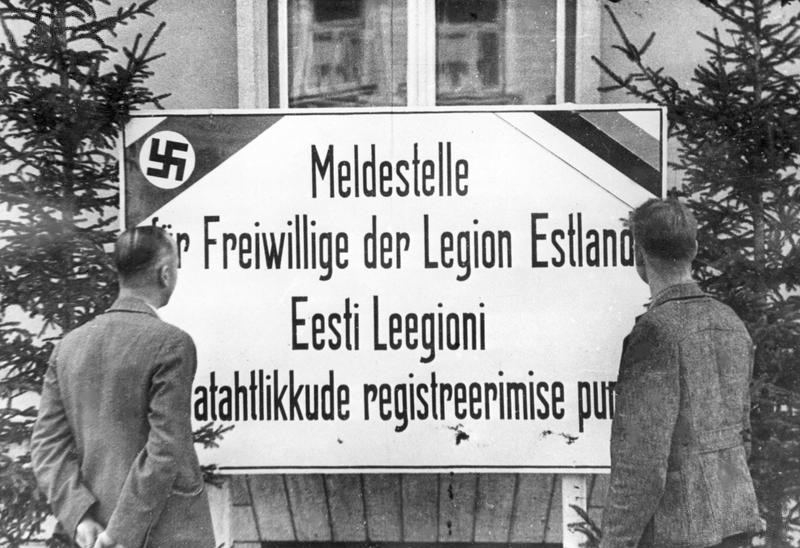
Estonian Legion recruiting point

After the Summer War, the Wehrmacht troops entered the Soviet Union via the Baltics and began recruiting local residents into security units for service in the Army Group North Rear Area starting in summer of 1941. Later in the war, Baltic nationals were conscripted into the 20th Waffen Grenadier Division of the SS, the 15th Waffen Grenadier Division of the SS, and the 19th Waffen Grenadier Division of the SS.

== See also ==
- Estonian War of Independence
- Guerrilla war in the Baltic states
