= RVL (disambiguation) =

RVL may stand for:

== Organizations ==
- Racing Victoria Limited, the organisation which administers horse racing in Victoria, Australia
- Rajavartiolaitos, Finnish Border Guard
- Regio-Verkehrsverbund Lörrach, a German transport association in Baden-Württemberg
- RusVelo Russian cycling team, now Gazprom–RusVelo
- Relvastatud Võitluse Liit, an Estonian underground organization of the Forest Brothers active between 1945-1949

== Transport ==
- Mifflin County Airport, FAA LID code RVL
- Raritan Valley Line, an American commuter rail service operated by New Jersey Transit
- Roseville railway station, Sydney, Australia
- Royal Viking Line, a defunct cruise line
- RVL Aviation, a British airline, part of RVL Group
- Villingen (Schwarzwald), a train station in Germany

== Other uses ==
- Regional Water Polo League (Regionalna vaterpolo liga), former regional water polo league in Southeast Europe
- RVL, prefix for the numbering scheme of the Wii video game console, and its parts and accessories
- "RVL 6768" (September 27, 2016), the pilot episode of the post-apocalyptic SyFy TV series, Aftermath, starring Anne Heche
- Regional Water Polo League (Regionalna vaterpolo liga), former regional water polo league in Southeast Europe
