= Ants Kaljurand =

Estonian military personnel (1917–1951)

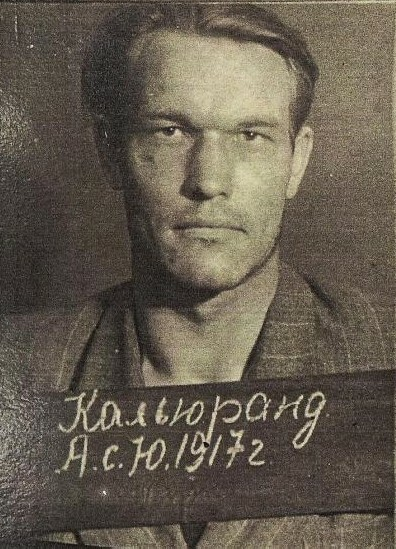
- Mugshot of Kaljurand in mid-1900s
- Born: 20 October 1917; Revel, Autonomous Governorate of Estonia, Russian Republic
- Died: 13 March 1951 (aged 33); Tallinn, then part of Estonian SSR, Soviet Union
- Military career
- Allegiance: Estonia (1938–1940); Nazi Germany (1942–1944)
- Branch: Estonian Defense Forces; Estonian Defense League; Omakaitse; Waffen-SS; Armed Combat Union
- Nickname: Terrifying Ants
- Known for: Being a Forest Brother
- Conflicts: Summer War; World War II; Guerrilla war in the Baltic states

Ants Kaljurand (20 October 1917 – 13 March 1951), popularly known as Terrifying Ants (Estonian: Hirmus Ants), was an Estonian anti-communist and Forest Brother during and after World War II.

== Early life ==
Ants Kaljurand was born on 20 October 1917 in Tallinn. His mother Juula was born in 1887. There is no information about his father. Kaljurand grew up in the village of Teesu near Pidula Bay on the island of Saaremaa. He graduated from Pidula Primary School.

In 1935, he went to Koonga Parish (now Lääneranna Parish) in Pärnu County to work as a farm laborer on Sepa Farm. In 1938, he served in the Estonian Defense Forces and then continued on as a laborer on Sepa Farm.

== Partisan life ==
Kaljurand joined the Forest Brothers and in the summer of 1941, participated in attacks on Soviet forces in Lääne and Pärnu counties. Between 1942 and 1944, during the occupation of Estonia by Nazi Germany, he served in the paramilitary Omakaitse and later on the eastern front as part of the Estonian Legion. When the German army retreated from Estonia in 1944, he deserted, was arrested by Soviet forces and sent to a prison camp in Tallinn. He escaped in December of the same year and continued his activities as a Forest Brother.

During the Soviet occupation of Estonia, Kaljurand was recruited into the Armed Combat Union (Estonian: Relvastatud Võitluse Liit), founded under the leadership of Endel Redlich, and appointed leader of the Soontaga region, although Kaljurand later claimed he was never an active member.

== Capture and execution ==
It was not until midsummer 1949 that the NKVD arrested him.

On 24 June 1949 Ants Kaljurand and two members of his squad were discovered sleeping in the woods near the village of Võitra. Forest Brother Aleksander Valter and Arved Pill were seriously wounded in an exchange of fire. Ants tried to escape, but was wounded with a bayonet and captured.

Kaljurand, Pill and Juhan Metsaäär were sentenced to death, others to from ten to twenty-five years in a prison camp. They were executed on 13 March 1951.

== Memorial ==
On 10 July 2011 a memorial stone commemorating Ants Kaljurand was unveiled at the Mihkli Church in Koonga Parish, Pärnu County, at the initiative of the Estonian Defense League.

== See also ==
- Estonian partisans
- Summer War
