= Estonian partisans =

Anti-Soviet partisans in Estonia active in 1940s and 1950s

Guerrilla war in Estonia
- Part of guerrilla war in the Baltic states and Occupation of the Baltic States
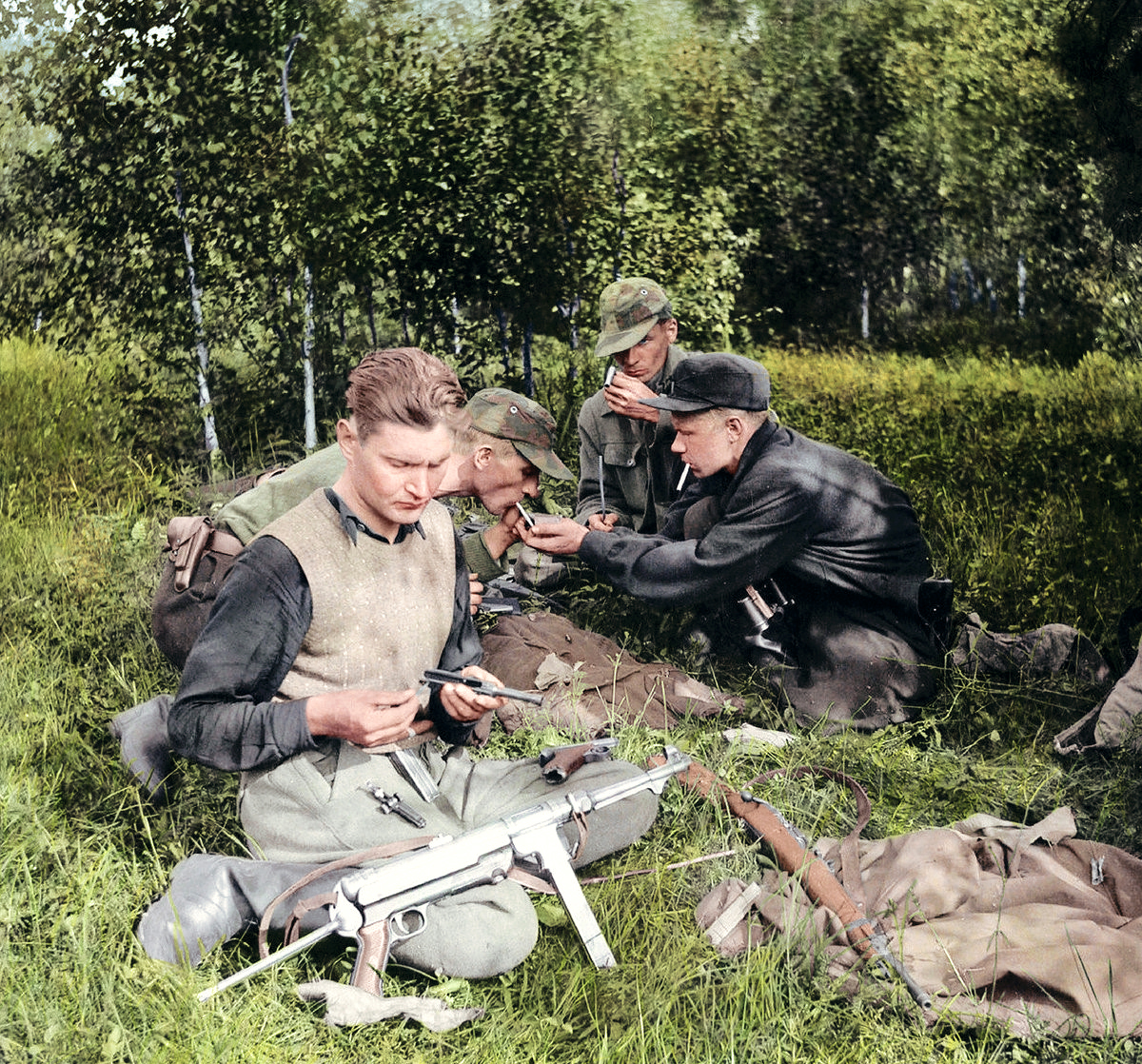
- Estonian fighters, Järva county in 1953, relaxing after a shooting exercise
Date	August 6, 1940 – June 22, 1941; July 1, 1944 – March 29, 1953
Location	Estonian SSR
Result	Soviet victory: Insurgency suppressed

Belligerents
(Estonia) Estonian Partisans	Soviet Union: Estonian Soviet Socialist Republic; (Soviet Union) Soviet Armed Forces; (Soviet Union) MGB; (Soviet Union) NKVD (until 1946)

Commanders and leaders
Endel Redlich †; Ants Kaljurand (executed)	Boris Kumm

Strength
30,000 (total throughout 1944–1953)	Unknown

Casualties and losses
>2,200	891 (Soviet estimate)

Estonian partisans, also called the Forest Brothers (Estonian: Metsavennad) were partisans who engaged in guerrilla warfare against Soviet forces in Estonia from 1940 to 1941 and 1944 to 1978.

When the USSR occupied and annexed Estonia in 1940, former civilians, soldiers, and real and perceived opponents to the Kremlin were threatened with arrest and repression. People sought refuge in the forest after the mass deportation on June 14, 1941.

The largest organization of the Forest Brothers was the Armed Combat Union (RVL), which operated from 1946 to 1949. The most important RVL leaders were killed in the summer of 1949. Large battles between the Forest Brothers and KGB units ended in Estonia in 1953, although minor conflicts continued until 1957.

The last Forest Brothers to be arrested were Hugo and Aksel Mõttus, who were captured in Võru County in the summer of 1967. August Sabbe remained at large until 1978, when he was either killed in Võru County by the KGB or drowned attempting to escape them.

== History ==
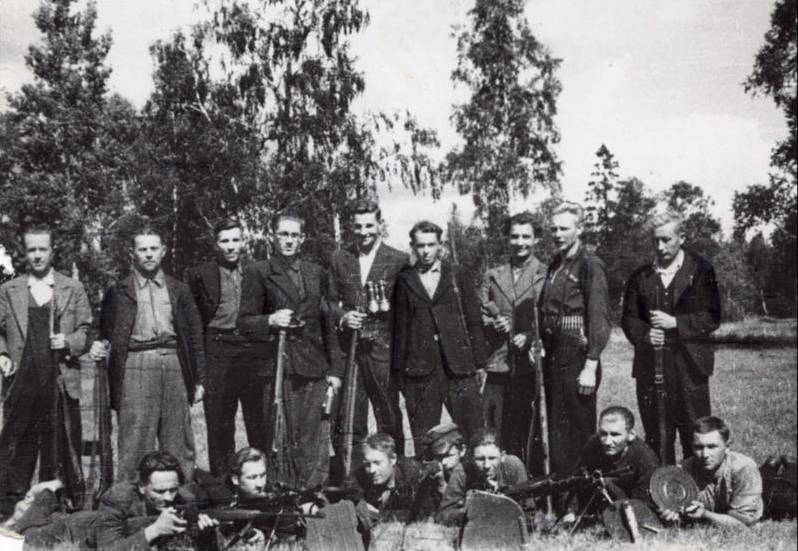
A group of Forest Brothers in northern Estonia, 1941

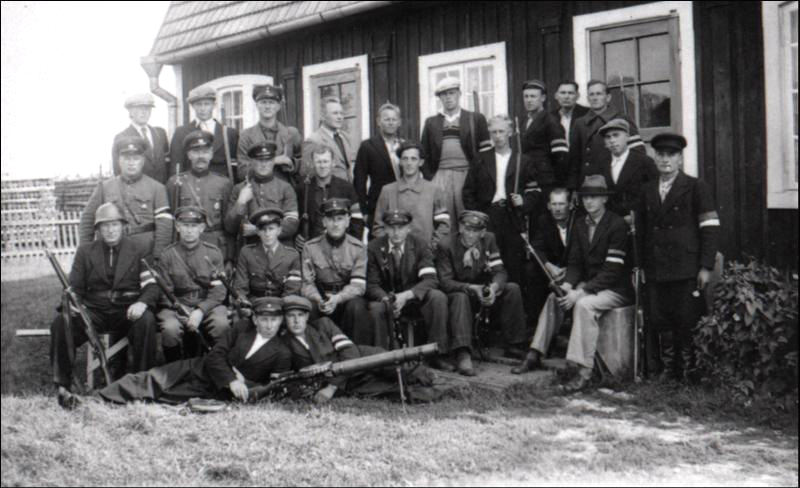
Mõniste Parish's "Home Guard" detachment on the day of its formation, August 1, 1941

The Soviet Union occupied and annexed Estonia, Latvia, and Lithuania in 1940. From then on, former statesmen and soldiers hid in the forests, as they would otherwise have been executed or deported by the new regime. Many went into hiding after the mass deportation in June 1941.

=== The Summer War ===
When war broke out between Germany and the Soviet Union on June 22, 1941, many Estonians escaped into forests to aid the liberation of Estonia from Soviet occupation. During the Summer War, the Forest Brothers liberated various cities and towns in Estonia. The largest battles took place around Timmkanal, as well as Tartu, where the Forest Brothers repelled the Soviet forces on July 10, 1941.

=== After 1944 ===
By November 25, 1944, the territory of Estonia was completely occupied by the Red Army. By the autumn of that year, thousands of Estonian soldiers, former Wehrmacht officers, and members of the Omakaitse had taken refuge in the forest. Former employees of the Soviet administration and people evading conscription into the Red Army hid alongside them.

Their uniforms combined elements of the uniforms of the former Estonian army, the Wehrmacht, and civilian clothing. They were armed mainly with infantry weapons that the Germans left behind when they were pushed back. Groups of Forest Brothers consisted of five to ten people, with whom several dozen accomplices in the local population were associated.

The Soviet command and the government of the Estonian SSR created forces to fight underground resistance movements. The 5th Infantry Division of the Internal Troops of the NKVD, stationed in Latvia under the command of Major General Pyotr Leontiev, extended its operations to Estonia. Estonian destruction battalions (comprising 5,300 men) were also formed.

Arnold Veimer received a petition from the chairman of the Council of People's Commissars of the Estonian SSR to evict the families of "traitors to the Motherland, traitors, and other hostile elements". In August 1945, 407 civilians, most of them of German descent, were transferred from Estonia to Perm Oblast. An additional 18 families (51 persons) were transferred to Tyumen Oblast in October, 37 families (87 persons) in November, and 37 families (91 persons) in December.

In 1945, NKVD troops and destruction battalions killed 432 Estonian freedom fighters and arrested 584 people, including 449 supporters of the partisans. At the same time, 56 policemen, soldiers, and officers of the NKVD troops; 86 fighter squad members; and 141 pro-Soviet activists were killed. The anti-Soviet partisan war in Estonia continued until 1953. Up to 30,000 people joined the Forest Brothers.

=== Ants Kaljurand ===
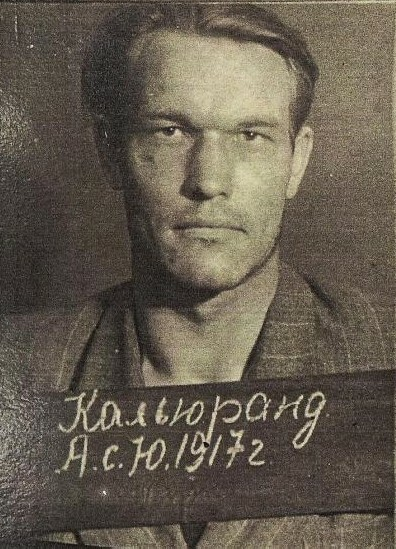
Mugshot of Ants Kaljurand

Forest Brother Ants "The Terrible" Kaljurand served as the local leader of the RVL, a partisan organization founded by Endel Redlich. Kaljurand was arrested in 1949 and executed in March 1951.

=== Forest Brothers of Võrumaa ===
The Forest Brothers of Võrumaa were sent to destroy large Soviet KGB units, leading to several battles between the KGB forces and the Forest Brothers. Although losses were borne by both sides, most battles resulted in greater losses for the Soviet forces.

== Substantial battles ==
=== Battle of Osula ===
The Battle of Osula (Estonian: Osula lahing), or Battle of Määritsa, took place in the village of Osula in Sõmerpalu Parish from March 31 to April 1, 1946. The battle between the Forest Brothers and the Soviet KGB forces on Hendrik Farm was one of the largest in the county. Seven Forest Brothers, five men and two women, took part in the engagement. The exact number of KGB soldiers involved was unknown, but up to 300 participated. The battle lasted seven hours; near the end, the partisans ran out of ammunition and the house caught fire. Two Forest Brothers were killed during the battle and the rest died in the house fire.

A letter was found in the flue of the house's furnace. It read:

"Estonian People! Today, on 1 April 1946, we, the Estonian partisans, fought against the traitors of the Estonian people. We resisted about ~ 8 hours. Estonian people, fight just as firmly for the freedom and independence of the Estonian people. Long live free Estonia and the Estonian people!"

=== Battle of Saika Bunker ===
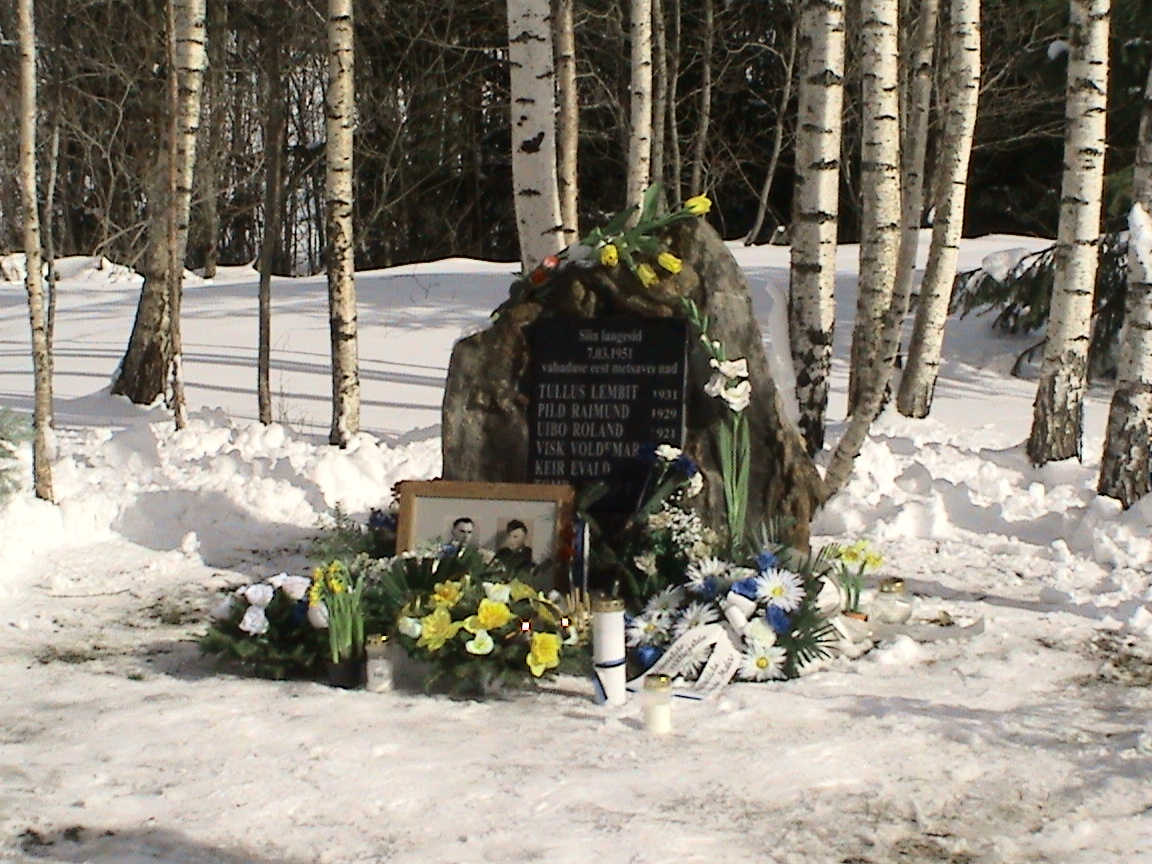
Memorial for the Forest Brothers killed during the Battle of Saika

The Battle of Saika Bunker (Estonian: Saika punkrilahing) occurred in the village's forest on March 7, 1951.

Eight Forest Brothers and an unknown number of KGB guards took part in the battle. It was the first major conflict between the Forest Brothers and MGB forces in the Vastseliina region. MGB soldiers came to capture the bunker from two sides: from the village of Mauri towards Saika and from the village of Rebäse towards Saika.

Around 10 am, gunshots broke out and could be heard from the forest in the nearby villages. The battle lasted around four hours. Five MGB soldiers were killed in the engagement along with six Forest Brothers. August Kuus and Richard Vähi, the two surviving partisans, later died in a 1953 battle in Puutli.

A memorial stone was opened in 2007 to honor the six Forest Brothers who died in the engagement.

=== Battle of Puutlipalu ===
The Battle of Puutlipalu Bunker (Estonian: Puutlipalu lahing) took place in Puutli, Võru County on March 29, 1953, when KGB officers raided a bunker occupied by Forest Brothers at 9 am. The siege lasted almost three hours. When the Forest Brothers were wounded, they set off their grenades to prevent them from being used by KGB forces. Eight Forest Brothers, Richard Vähi, Karl Kaur, August Kuus, August Kurra, Leida Grünthal, Endel Leimann, Lehte-Kai Ojamäe, and Ilse Vähi, were killed in the battle.

After the battle, the bunker was burned by security. The bodies of the dead partisans were taken for identification and buried at the edge of the Ristimäe forest.

== Aftermath ==
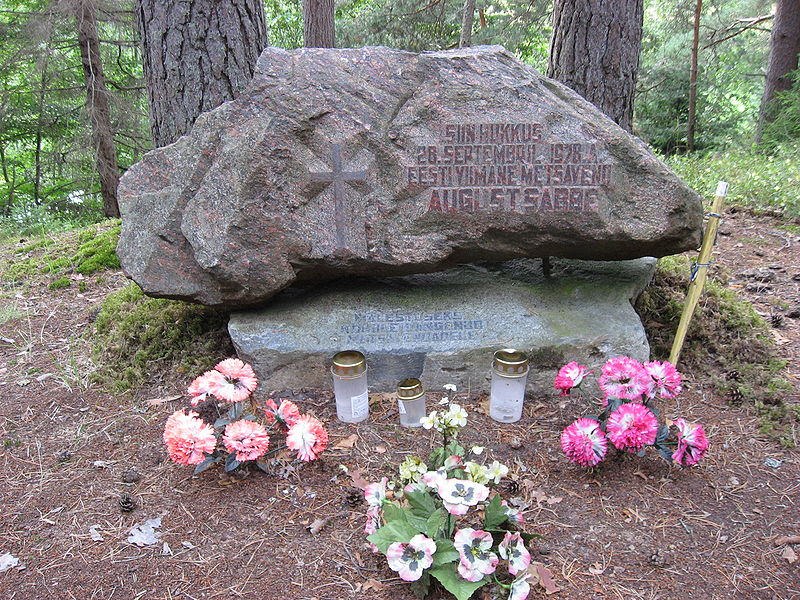
August Sabbe's death place monument, near the Võhandu river in, Paidra, Estonia, 2008. Estonian inscription: Here on 28 September 1978, drowned the last Estonian soldier of the Forest Brothers, August Sabbe

Eerik-Niiles Kross compiled a list of Forest Brothers who have died since 1944. It contains 1,700 names, including those who died in captivity. Historian Mart Laar claims, based on Kross, that there were more than 2,200 known fatalities.

The last Estonian partisan, August Sabbe, died on September 27, 1978, reportedly drowning in a river after being found by KGB officers while he was fishing. Sabbe's body was found lodged under a log.

Since 1998, the Estonian Defence League has organized the Põrgupõhja expedition, an annual military sports event in the forests of Vana-Vigala and Eidapere, in honor of the partisans.

In 2019, a job was created in the Estonian War Museum to study the Forest Brothers.

== In popular culture ==
- The Canadian film Legendi loojad (Creators of the Legend) about the Estonian Forest Brothers was released in 1963. The film was funded by donations from exiled Estonians.
- The 1997 documentary film We Lived for Estonia tells the story of the Estonian Forest Brothers from the viewpoint of one of its participants.
- The 2007 Estonian film Sons of One Forest (Estonian: Ühe metsa pojad) follows the story of two Forest Brothers in southern Estonia who fight with an Estonian from the Waffen-SS against the Soviets.
- The 2013 novel Forest Brothers by Geraint Roberts follows a British Navy officer who returns to Estonia during the ongoing conflict between Germany and the Soviet Union. Many characters who have aided him in the past hide in the forest.

== Estimates ==
According to historians who studied the partisans, there were between 14,000 and 15,000 Forest Brothers in Estonia following the Second World War, along with people simply hiding in the woods. According to a report submitted by Soviet officer Oskar Borelli in June 1953, 1,495 members of the Forest Brothers and other resistance organizations had been killed by KGB forces between 1944 and June 1, 1953, and another 9,870 were arrested (5,471 members of the Forest Brothers and 1,114 members of the secret organization, 1212 citizens).

According to Soviet sources, 891 people died between 1946 and 1956 as a result of the Forest Brothers, including 447 Soviet activists; 295 members of extermination battalions; 52 members of the NKVD, NKGB, and MGB; and 47 military personnel.

== See also ==
- Anti-Soviet partisans
- Forest Guerrillas
- Guerrilla war in the Baltic states
- Latvian partisans
- Lithuanian partisans
- Omakaitse
