= Kurg =

Family name

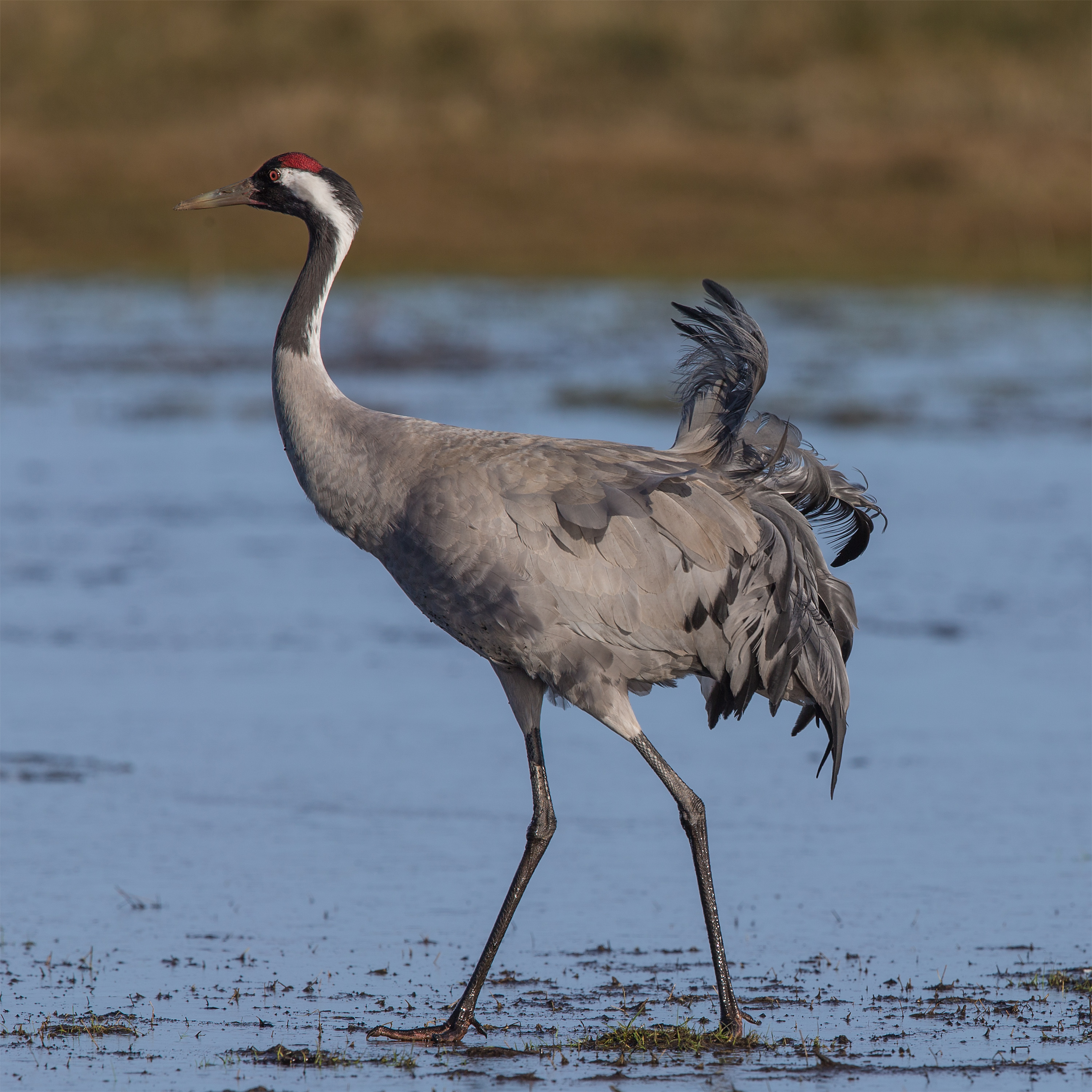

Origin
- Language: Estonian
- Meaning: crane (genus Grus)

Kurg is an Estonian surname meaning "crane" (genus Grus). As of 1 January 2022, there were 649 people with the surname in Estonia: 311 men and 338 women. Kurg is ranked as the 139th most common surname for men in Estonian and 139th for women. The surname Kurg is most common in Põlva County, where 18.40 per 10,000 inhabitants of the county bear the name.

People bearing the surname Kurg include:

- Ants Kurg (born 1962), biochemist (:et)
- Friedrich Kurg (1898–1945), military major and partisan
- Henn-Ants Kurg (1898–1943), military colonel and diplomat
- Ilmar Kurg (1922–2003), Baptist clergyman and soldier
- Ingmar Kurg (born 1955), Baptist clergyman, theologian, and publisher
- Kalev Kurg (1961–2005), motocross racer and motorsport activist
- Kalle Kurg (born 1942), poet, writer, critic, translator and editor
- Kustav Kurg (1902–1992), politician
- Rain Kurg (born 1980), rugby player and sportsman
- Regina-Nino Kurg (born 1979), artist
- Õnne Kurg (born 1973), cross-country skier
- Vambola Kurg (1898–1981), actor
