= Battle of Tartu (1941) =

- Part of the Eastern Front (World War II) and Occupation of the Baltic States
- The burning of the city of Tartu in the summer of 1941, with St. Mary's Church in the background
Date	9–25 July 1941
Location	Tartu, Estonia 58.3800°N 26.7225°E
Result	Estonian partisan victory
Territorial changes	Occupation of Estonia by Nazi Germany

Belligerents
(Estonia) Estonian Forest Brothers (Nazi Germany) German Wehrmacht	(Soviet Union) Red Army (Soviet Union) NKVD

Commanders and leaders
(Estonia) Friedrich Kurg	(Soviet Union) Ivan Lyubovtsev

Strength
Unknown	Unknown

Casualties and losses
Unknown	Unknown

The Battle of Tartu was a military engagement fought in and around Tartu, Estonia, in July 1941, during the German invasion of the Soviet Union in the Second World War. The battle formed part of the Summer War, a period of fighting in Estonia between Soviet forces and Estonian anti-Soviet resistance groups following the launch of Operation Barbarossa.

The fighting began on 9 July, when Estonian Forest Brothers, led by Major Freidrich Krug, moved to seize key positions in Tartu. German reconnaissance units and armored vehicles provided support to the Estonian partisans, and German reinforcements subsequently joined the fighting against soviet forces. The battle involved street fighting and artillery bombardment, which caused extensive damage to the city. Soviet forces were driven from Tartu as German and Estonian forces advanced through southern Estonia

== Background ==
=== Soviet occupation and resistance ===
In June 1940, the Soviet Union occupied Estonia following a Soviet ultimatum and the entry of Soviet troops into the country. Estonia was subsequently incorporated into the Soviet Union as the Estonian Soviet Socialist Republic. The Soviet authorities dismantled Estonia's pre-war political and military institutions, including the Estonian Defense League (kaitseliit), whose members had previously participated in the countries national defense. The Soviet occupation also brought political repression, arrest, and deportations. On 14 June 1941, Soviet authorities carried out a mass deportation operation in Estonia, removing approximately 10,000 people from the country. These measures contributed to the growing opposition to Soviet rule and led some Estonians to seek refuge in forest and rural areas to avoid arrest and deportation.

On 22 June 1941, Germany invaded the Soviet Union in Operation Barbarossa. The invasion created an opportunity for Estonian anti-soviet resistance groups to expand they're activities. These groups, commonly referred to as the Forest Brothers, included former soldiers, members of the disbanded Defense League, and civilians who have gone into hiding. They attacked soviet security personnel and military units, disrupted communications and sought to take control of local centers before the arrival of German forces. In southern Estonia, the resistance developed into an armed uprising before the first half of July 1941. The insurgents established control over several localities and organized into larger formations as German troops advanced into the region.
