= Osula =

Osula may refer to:

- Osula, Estonia, a village
- William Osula, a football player
