= Battle of Tartu =

Battle of Tartu can refer to one of the following campaigns in the city of Tartu and along the Suur Emajõgi river:

- Siege of Tartu (1224) during the Livonian Crusade
- Battle of Tartu (1919) in the Estonian War of Independence, 13-14 January 1919
- Battle of Tartu (1941) in the Summer War, 9–25 July 1941
- Tartu Offensive, 10 August – 6 September 1944
