= Urna (disambiguation) =

Urna URNA may refer to:

- Urna, a Buddhist symbol
- Urna (singer) (born 1969), Mongolian singer
- Urna (Antarctica), a mountain in Queen Maud Land
- Útvar rychlého nasazení, a special weapons and tactics unit of the Czech Police
- U-RNA, a type of RNA

== See also ==
- Urn (disambiguation)
- Erna (disambiguation)
