= Admiral Pitka Recon Challenge =

Recurring military exercise and competition in Estonia

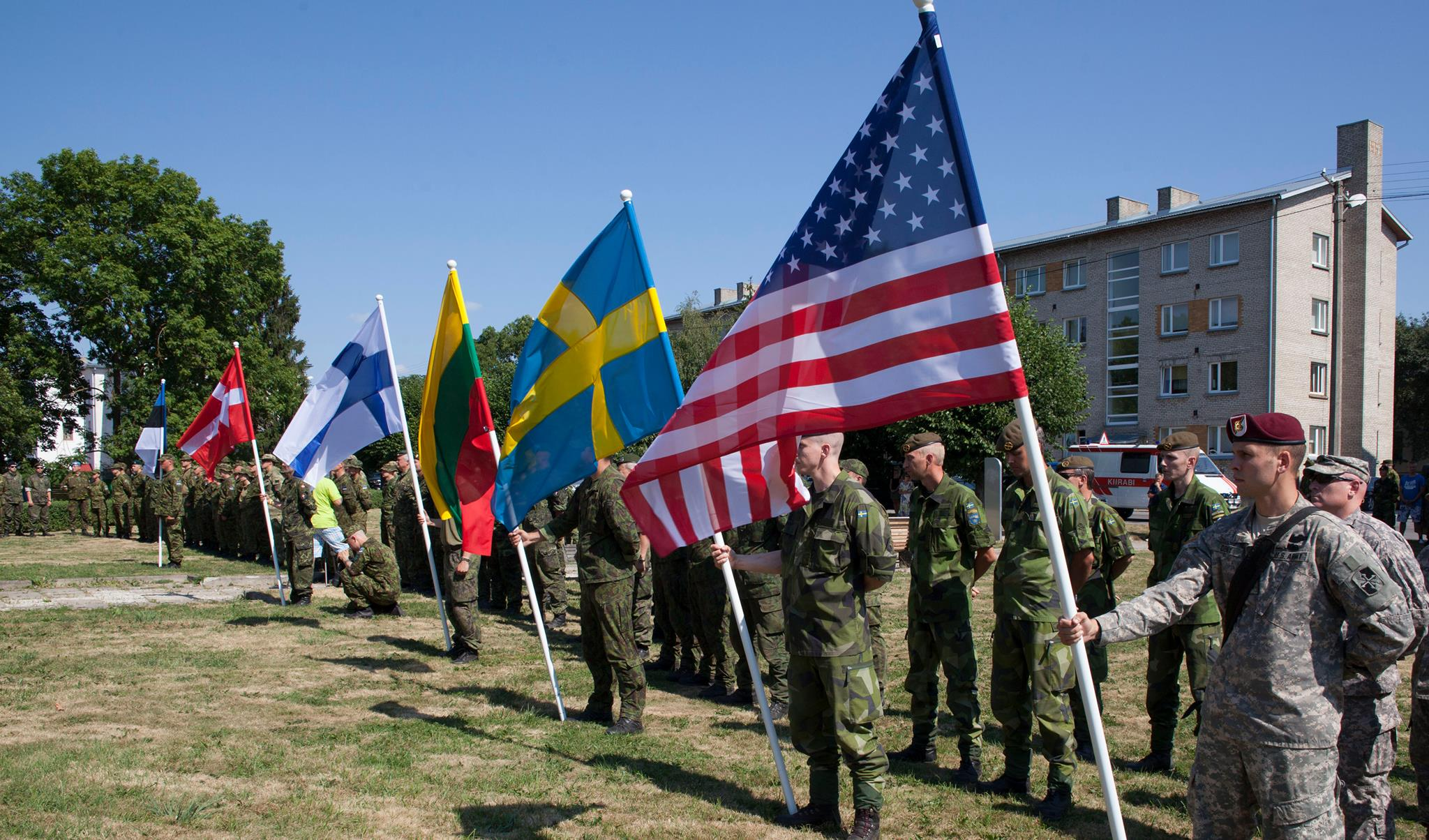
Soldiers from Estonia, Denmark, Finland, Lithuania, Sweden and the United States at Estonia's annual Admiral Pitka Recon Challenge.

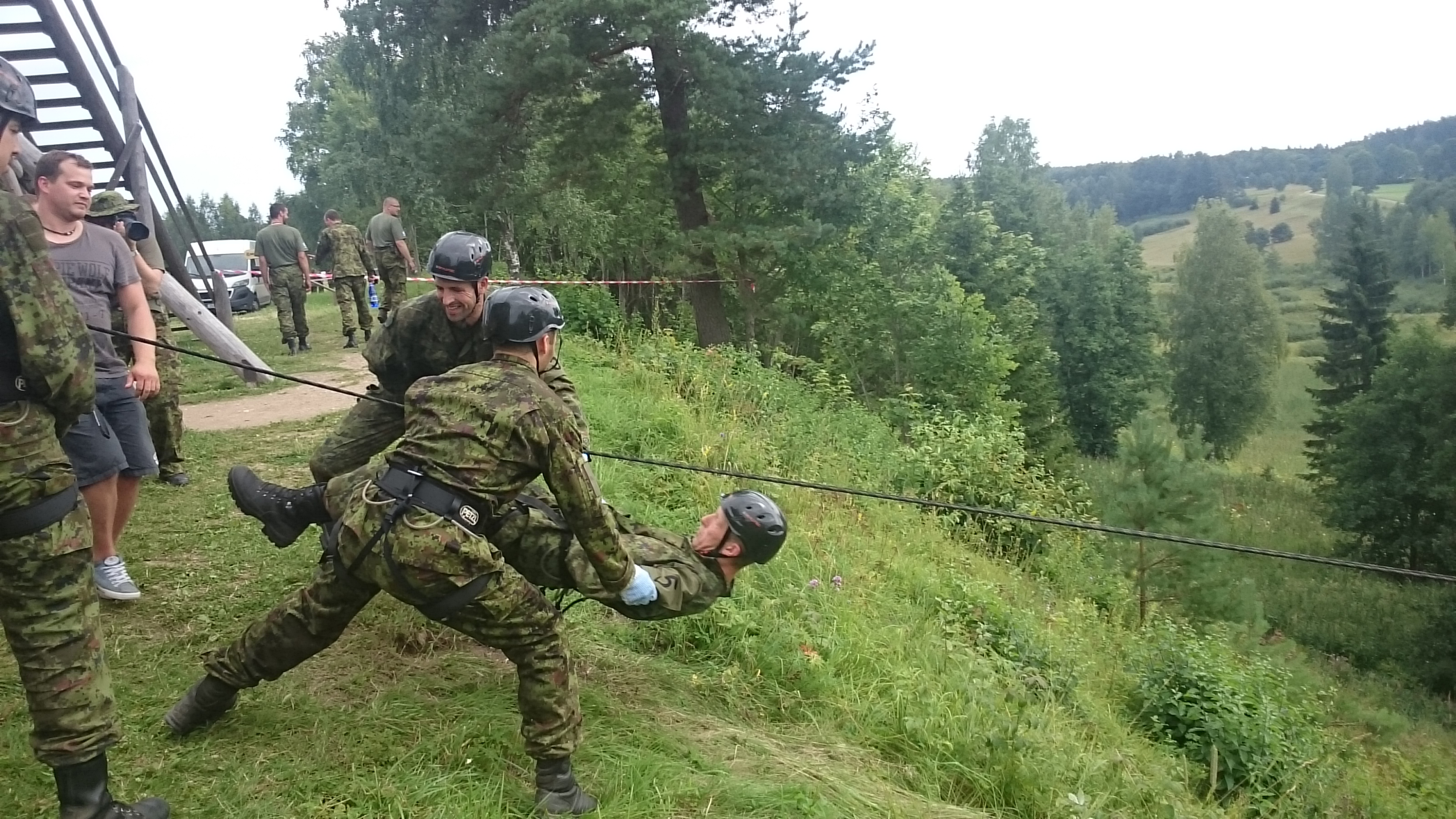
Admiral Pitka Recon Challenge in 2015

The Admiral Pitka Recon Challenge is an annual international military exercise and competition, one of the longest and most difficult in the world, held every August since 2013 in Estonia (canceled in 2020 due to COVID-19 restrictions). It is named after the Estonian War of Independence hero Johan Pitka, and is now held in different locations throughout Estonia each year. It replaced the Erna Raid (Estonian: Erna retk) held from 1995 to 2011.
