= Friedrich Kurg =

Estonian military officer

- Born: 10 January 1898 Sangaste Parish, Governorate of Estonia, Russian Empire
- Died: 31 July 1945 (aged 47) Valga County, Estonia
- Allegiance: Estonia; Nazi Germany
- Rank: Major; General Commander
- Awards: See Awards

Friedrich Kurg (10 January 1898 – 31 July 1945) was an Estonian military major and Forest Brother partisan.

== Personal life ==
Friedrich Kurg was born in Sangaste Parish, on 10 January 1898. Kurg studied at the St. Petersburg Secondary School of Science. On 29 October 1917, he completed the flagship course as an ensign under an accelerated program at the Vladimir School.

On 21 May 1923, Kurg married Marta Inn. They had two daughters, Juta Sepper and Viia Kurg. Viia was killed during a raid in 1945 on Saviküla farm in Soontaga, aged 20.

== Military career ==
On 30 November 1918, Kurg enlisted in the Estonian Army as a volunteer and served in the 2nd Squadron of the 1st Riding Regiment. In the Battle of Munamägi in the War of Independence, he stood out for his personal courage, for which he was awarded the 3rd degree of the Cross of Liberty, and after the war he was given 25 hectares of farmland near Hummuli.

=== Military Career in the Estonian Defense League ===
In February 1919, Kurg was sent to a military school. A year later, he joined the 2nd Infantry Regiment. Half a year later, he was sent back to the 7th Infantry Regiment and then assigned to the Junior Army Group as a junior officer. He became a flying student, Later, he was sent back to the Cavalry Regiment. On 30 August 1923, Kurg continued his studies at the military school with in-service training courses for officers. After completing his courses, he was sent back to the cavalry regiment and promoted to junior lieutenant, later to lieutenant and in 1933 he was promoted to captain.

Kurg participated in the activities of the Central Council of Officers and was active in the construction of the War of Independence memorials. The Defense League evaluated his merits and awarded him the White Cross of the Estonian Defence League, 3rd Class. On 24 February 1940, Kurg was promoted to major.

=== Participation in World War II ===
Following the Soviet occupation of Estonia in 1940 and the mass deportations on 14 June 1941, Kurg managed to hide and formed a large army in the forests of Kurelaane, who actively participated in the capture of Tartu. In July 1941, during the Summer War, the leadership of the German army appointed him as commander of the partisans of the Estonian territories. In July 1941, Kurg was the commander of Tartu. As the city's commander, he ordered the establishment of a concentration camp, where those who had opposed the Germans and those who had supported the Soviet authorities during the Soviet occupation, as well Red Army and NKVD destruction battalions were detained. In November, he became commander of the 41st Defense Reserve Battalion, which consisted of Estonian volunteers.

In 1942, Kurg was the battalion commander of the 37th Defense Battalion and worked to ensure the security of the German forces in the Pskov region. Friedrich Kurg commanded the 37th Estonian Police Battalion and the German army awarded him the 1st and 2nd class Iron Cross and Infantry Assault Badge.

In July 1944, Kurg was appointed commander of the 2nd Battalion of the 46th Regiment of the 20th Waffen Grenadier Division of the SS.

=== After the War ===
During the general withdrawal of the Germans on 22 September 1944, Kurg remained in Estonia and became a partisan, hiding under the name of Jüri Raudkivi in Valga County. Kurg died during an NKVD attack on 31 July 1945, led by Major Uno Laht, an employee of the Ministry of National Security of the Estonian SSR. His grave location is unknown.

== Memorial ==
A memorial stone to Kurg is located in the garden of Laatre Lutheran Church in Tõlliste municipality.

== Awards ==
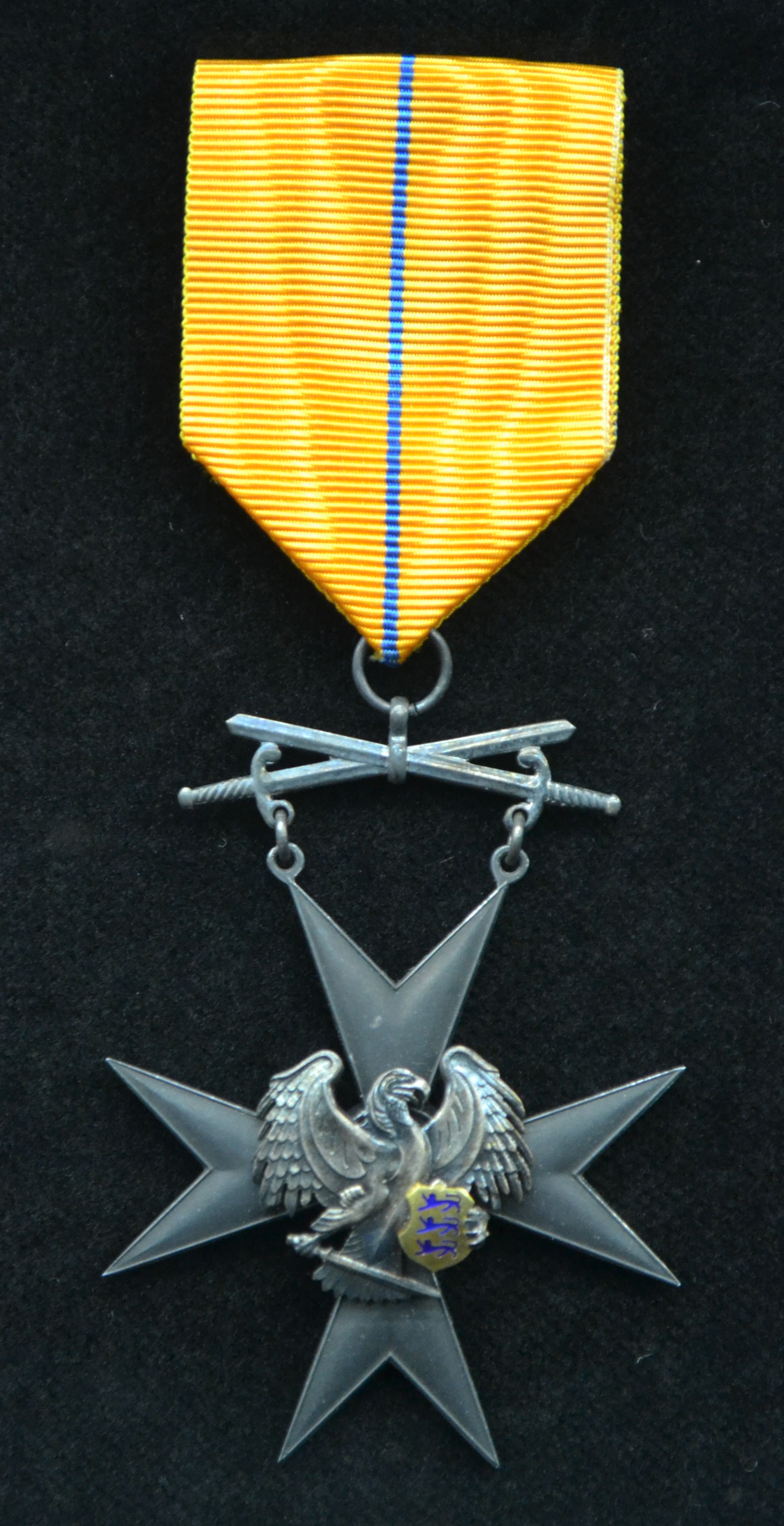
Order of the Cross of the Eagle, one of the 5 awards Kurg was awarded

=== Estonian ===
- Cross of Liberty, VR II/3 (11 June 1920)
- Military Order of Cross of the Eagle, 5th Class (20 February 1939)
- White Cross of the Defense League, 3rd Class

=== German ===
- Iron Cross Class I and II (1942 and 1943)
- Infantry Assault Badge (1942)
