= Erna Raid =

International military exercise and competition in Estonia

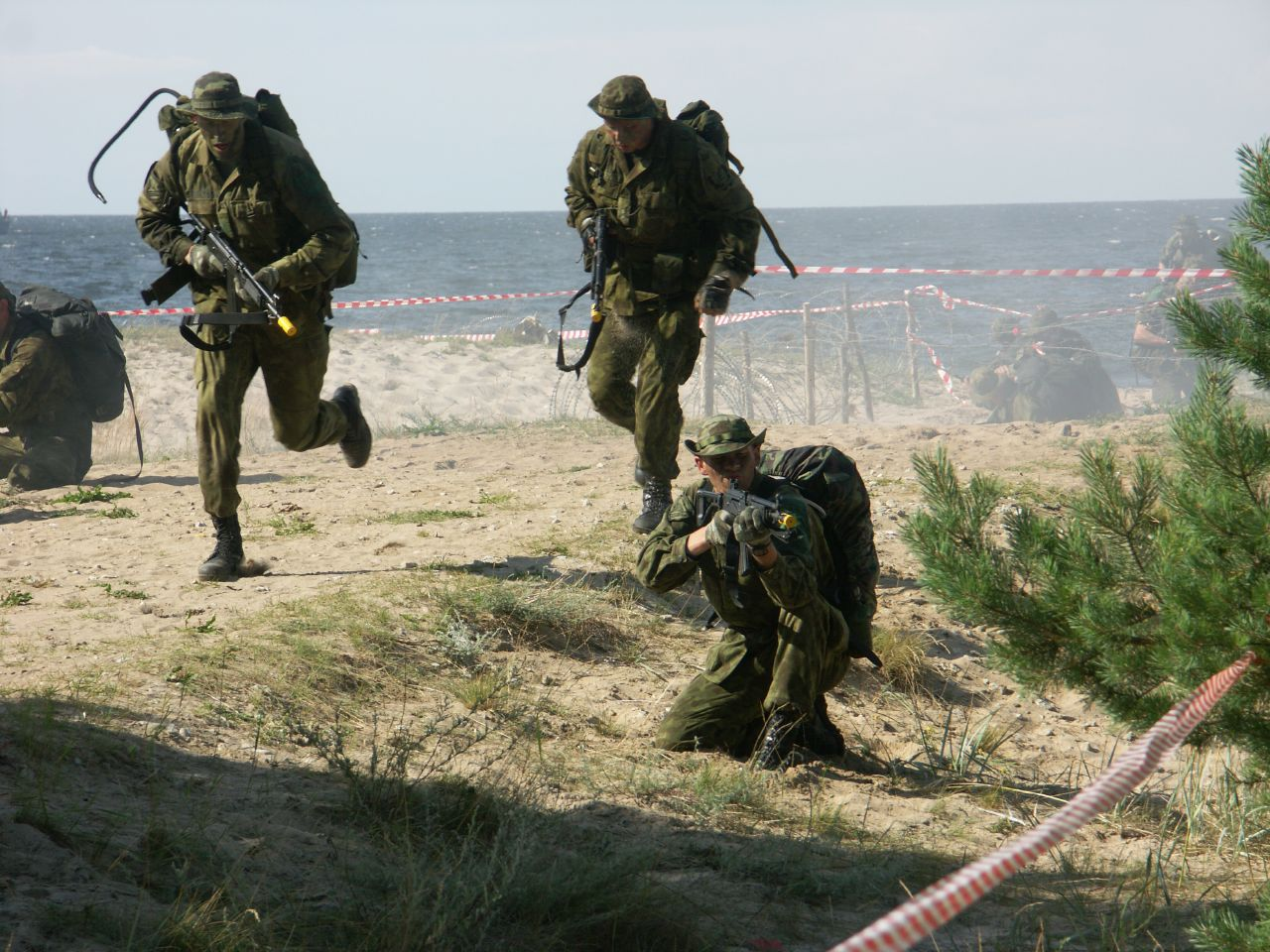
Competitors conducting a beach landing exercise

Erna Raid (Estonian: Erna retk) was an annual international military exercise and competition, one of the longest and most difficult in the world, held every August from 1995 to 2011 in Estonia. It was organized by the Erna Society and commemorates the actions of the long-range reconnaissance group 'Erna' in the summer of 1941.

== Background ==
The competition is named after the Erna long-range reconnaissance group (Estonian: Erna luuregrupp) and themed after its activities in the summer of 1941. In 1993, a group of enthusiasts followed the historical route of the Erna group of 1941 and came up with the idea of organizing a commemorative competition. A first try with only Estonian participants was held in 1994. In the autumn of 1994, the Erna society was founded, and in 1995, the first annual international competition was held.

== Competition ==
The traditional parts of the competition were:

- landing, in rubber boats, onto a "hostile" shore;
- cross-country tactical movement and navigation, without night camp down, over a distance of around 150 kilometers while avoiding and escaping from "hostile" security forces;
- various (and varying over the years) minigames during the competition. These may involve grenade throwing, combat first aid, and other military skills.

Foreign teams were always welcome to partake in the competition. In 2007, 28 teams from nine countries participated: Estonia (18 teams), the Czech Republic (one), Denmark (one), Finland (two), Germany (one), Norway (two), Portugal (one), Sweden (one), and the United States (one), of which Portugal and the Czech Republic are newcomers. Teams from the United Kingdom participated in earlier years (most recently, a British Territorial Army team in 2006), but only observed in 2007. A team from Cyprus also observed. Teams from the People's Republic of China were traditionally successful in the competition and took 1st and 2nd place in 2002. Other successful teams came from Finland and Norway.

Due to the home advantage attributed to the intimate knowledge of the terrain by the local teams, changes to the competition were discussed in 2011.

In 2013, the competition was renamed the Admiral Pitka Recon Challenge after the Estonian War of Independence hero Johan Pitka and is now held in different locations throughout Estonia each year.

== Past results ==
The table below records the final results for the year's competition. It does not include retired and disqualified teams. DL is the acronym for the Defense League.

Position	2011	2010	2009	2008	2007	2006	2005	2004	2003	2002	2001	2000	1999
1st	(Estonia) Scouts Battalion	(Estonia) DL Põlva	(Estonia) DL Tartu 1	(Estonia) DL Tartu 2	(Estonia) Reserve Officers	(Estonia) Reserve Officers	(Estonia) Scouts Bat. 1	(Estonia) Scouts Bat. 2	Finland 2	China 2	(Estonia) DL Järva	(Estonia) Border Guard	(Estonia) Border Guard
2nd	(Estonia) Kirde KRK	(Estonia) Scouts Battalion	(Estonia) DL Tartu 2	(Estonia) Reserve Officers / DL Tallinn	(Estonia) DL Tartu	(Estonia) Scouts Bat. 1	(Estonia) Recce Bat.	(Estonia) Reserve Officers	(Estonia) Scouts Bat.	China 1	Finland 2	Norway	(Estonia) Kalev Inf. Bat.
3rd	(Estonia) DL Harju 1	(Estonia) DL Tartu 2	(Estonia) Military Academy 2	(Estonia) Kuperjanovi Single Infantry Bn	Finland 2	(Estonia) Military Academy	(Estonia) Military Academy	(Estonia) Scouts Bat. 1	(Estonia) DL Järva	(Estonia) DL Harju	(Estonia) Border Guard	(Estonia) DL Harju	(Estonia) DL Pärnu
4th	(Estonia) Military Academy	(Estonia) Military Academy 1	(Estonia) Kuperjanovi Single Inf Bn	(Estonia) Border Guard	(Estonia) Police	(Estonia) DL Järva	Finland 1	(Estonia) Military School	(Estonia) Recce Bat.	(Estonia) Security Police	(Estonia) Logistics Bat.	(Estonia) AA Battery	China 2
5th	(Estonia) Border Guard	(Estonia) DL Järva 1	(Estonia) DL Tallinn 2	(Estonia) DL Tallinn 1	(Estonia) DL Järva	(Estonia) Scouts Bat. 2	China 2	(Estonia) DL Pärnu	China 2	(Estonia) Military Academy	China 2	(Estonia) Logistics Bat.	Finland 1
6th	(Estonia) DL Järva 2	(Estonia) DL Järva 2	(Estonia) DL Järva 1	(Estonia) Military Academy	(Estonia) Border Guard	(Estonia) DL Tartu	China 1	(Estonia) DL Järva	(Estonia) Military Academy	(Estonia) DL Järva	(Estonia) Reserve Officers	Finland 1	(Estonia) Guard Bat.
7th	(Estonia) DL Põlva	(Estonia) Border Guard	(Estonia) Military Academy 1	(Estonia) EDF Logistics Centre	(Estonia) Viru Bat.	(Estonia) Police	(Estonia) Air Defence Div.	Denmark 1	(Estonia) Border Guard	(Estonia) DL Tallinn	(Estonia) AA Battery	(Estonia) Reserve Officers	(Estonia) DL Võru
8th	(Estonia) DL Pärnu 2	(Estonia) DL Tartu 1	(Estonia) DL Põlva	(Estonia) DL Tartu 1	(Estonia) DL Tallinn / Reserve Officers	(Estonia) DL Tallinn	Sweden	Finland 2	China 1	Lithuania	China 1	(Estonia) Kalev Inf. Bat.	Denmark
9th	Finland 3	(Estonia) NE Territorial Defence District	(Estonia) DL Harju	(Estonia) DL Valga	(Estonia) Pärnu Bat.	Germany	Germany	Lithuania	Denmark	(Estonia) Reserve Officers	(Estonia) Guard Bat.	(Estonia) EDF HQ	(Estonia) DL Järva
10th	(Estonia) DL Pärnu 1	(Estonia) Kuperjanovi Inf Bn	Finland 2	Germany	Finland 1	(Estonia) Border Guard	(Estonia) Reserve Officers	(Estonia) Recce Bat.	(Estonia) DL Harju 2	(Estonia) Scout Bat.	(Estonia) Security Police	(Estonia) Security Police	Norway 1
11th	(Estonia) Nth. Guard Bat.	(Estonia) DL Tallinn Nõmme	(Estonia) DL Järva 2	(Estonia) DL Järva	Germany	(Estonia) EDF HQ	(Estonia) DL Järva	(Estonia) Logistic Bat.	(Estonia) DL Tallinn 2	(Estonia) Border Guard	(Estonia) Rescue Service	Finland 2	(Estonia) Military Academy
12th	Finland 2	(Estonia) DL Harju 1	(Estonia) EDF Log Centre CS Training Centre	(Estonia) Viru Single Infantry Bn	(Estonia) DL Harju	Canada	(Estonia) Guard Bat.	China 2	(Estonia) DL Tallinn 1	Finland	(Estonia) DL Tallinn	(Estonia) Military Academy	(Estonia) Reserve Officers
13th	Denmark 2	(Estonia) DL Tallinn 2	Finland 1	(Estonia) Reserve Officers 2	(Estonia) Scouts Bat.	(Estonia) Guard Bat.	(Estonia) DL Tartu	(Estonia) Air Defence Bat.	(Estonia) DL Võrumaa	(Estonia) Military School	Norway 1	Sweden	(Estonia) DL Põlva
14th	(Estonia) DL Tartu	(Estonia) DL Harju 2	(Estonia) Border Guard	(Estonia) DL Pärnu	(Estonia) Guard Bat.	Finland 1	Denmark 2	(Estonia) Military Academy	(Estonia) DL Pärnumaa	(Estonia) DL Võrumaa	Norway 2	Norway 2	China 1
15th	(Estonia) DL Tallinn 2	Lithuania	(Estonia) DL Women’s Corps Saaremaa	Lithuania	(United States) USA	(Estonia) Viru Bat.	(Estonia) DL Tallinn	Denmark 2	(Estonia) DL Harju 1	Norway 1	(Estonia) Signal Bat.	(Estonia) DL Võru	Sweden
16th	(Estonia) DL Järva	Belgium	(Estonia) DL Võru	(Estonia) DL Alutaguse Women’s Team	Denmark	Finland 2	Finland 2	China 1	(Estonia) Reserve Officers	Norway 2	(Estonia) Military Academy	Germany	United Kingdom
17th	(Estonia) DL Tallinn Nõmme	(Estonia) DL Pärnu	Denmark 1	Denmark 1	(Estonia) Military Academy	(Estonia) DL Valgamaa	(Estonia) Scouts Bat.	(Estonia) DL Võru	Austria	Romania	(Estonia) DL Põlva	(Estonia) DL Tallinn	Norway 2
18th	(Estonia) DL Pärnu 3	(Estonia) Military Academy 2	Denmark 2	(Estonia) DL Tallinn 2 (Toompea subunit)	Norway 1	(United States) USA	(Estonia) DL Võru	Finland 1	(Estonia) Engineering School	(Estonia) AA Battalion	Finland 1	Denmark 1	Italy 2
19th	Lithuania	Sweden 1	(Estonia) DL Tallinn 1	Denmark 3	Sweden	Denmark 1	Denmark 1	Sweden	(Estonia) Military School	Denmark 1	Sweden	China 1	(Estonia) Women's DL
20th	(Estonia) DL Harju Männiku	(Estonia) DL Harju 3	(Estonia) DL Women’s Corps Võru	(Estonia) Single Guard Bn	(Estonia) Women's DL	(United Kingdom) Great Britain	(Estonia) Pärnu Bat.	Germany	Finland 1	Finland 2	(Estonia) DL Harju	(Estonia) DL Järva	(United Kingdom) UK
21st	(Estonia) DL Tallinn Kalevi	(Estonia) DL Alutaguse Women's Team	(Estonia) DL Tallinn 3	Denmark 2	(Estonia) DL Võru	Belgium	(United States) USA	(Estonia) Guard Bat.	Lithuania	Sweden	(Estonia) EDF HQ	China 2	
22nd	(Estonia) DL Harju 2	Sweden 2		(United States) USA	Norway 2	(Estonia) Artillery Group	(Estonia) DL Pärnu	Belgium	(Estonia) Police	(Estonia) text	Denmark	(Estonia) Rescue Service	
23rd	Belgium	Finland 2		Belgium	Portugal	(Estonia) Women's DL Võru	Belgium	(Estonia) DL Tallinn	(Estonia) Rescue Service	Italy	(United States) USA Maryland	Italy 1	
24th	Finland 4	Denmark		(Estonia) DL Women’s Corps Rapla		Denmark 3	(Estonia) Women's DL Võru	Romania	Sweden	(Estonia) EDF HQ	United Kingdom	United Kingdom	
25th	Denmark 1			Norway 1		Latvia	Italy	Turkey	(Estonia) Guard Bat.	(Estonia) Rescue Service	(Estonia) Women's DL	(Estonia) Women's DL	
26th	(Estonia) Prison Service					Denmark 2		(Estonia) Women's DL	United Kingdom	(Estonia) Women's DL	Lithuania	Italy 1	
27th	Finland 1							(United States) USA	Poland	United Kingdom	(Estonia) Recce Battalion		
28th	(Estonia) 1.Infantry Bde Logistics Bat							United Kingdom		United Kingdom			
29th	(Georgia (country)) Georgia												

== Russian accusations of glorifying Nazism ==
Since the competition's initiation, sectors of the Russian media have claimed the competition's namesake was an attempt to glorify collaboration with Nazi Germany. [1] [2] [3] In 2007, high-ranking government officials sharply criticized the competition, calling it "the glamorization of Nazism" and expressing outrage over NATO members participating in the competition. Estonian officials attribute this recent development to the ongoing campaign for the 2008 Russian presidential election. Russian officials claim that the commemoration of the Erna group today is part of alleged efforts by the Estonian authorities to glorify the Nazi past (other parts of it being the relocation of a memorial to Red Army invaders and an official greeting from the Minister of Defense to veterans of a unit of Estonians conscripted into a division organized within the Waffen SS to defend Estonia).

An analyst of the US-based think tank Jamestown Foundation believes this view follows Soviet and post-Soviet Russia's official logic on two counts: first, that resistance to the Red Army was inherently illegitimate and conflatable with "fascism" in an occupied country or one targeted for occupation; second, that Estonia should be criticized for remembering an act of national resistance and its casualties.

Estonia's Minister of Defense, Jaak Aaviksoo, called the accusations "regrettable" and recalled that the Erna group saved the lives of many civilians from the vengeful Soviet paramilitary units, and specifically pointed out cases of burning farmers alive along with their farms in Kutla.
