= 7th Infantry Regiment (Estonia) =

Estonian military unit

7. Jalaväerügement; 7th Infantry Regiment
- Active: 1918-1940
- Country: Estonia
- Branch: Estonian Army
- Type: Infantry
- Role: Initial Reaction Force
- Garrison/HQ: Võru, Petseri
- Anniversaries: 18 December
- Engagements: Estonian War of Independence

The 7th Infantry Regiment (Estonian: 7. Jalaväerügement), was one of the two fast deployment border-covering Estonian regiments created during the Estonian War of Independence, which lasted till the Soviet occupation of Estonia. The main task of these regiments was to delay the invading forces on the borders in order to win more time for the mobilization to be carried out.

== History ==
The 7th Infantry Regiment staff was based in Võru and Petseri. The unit was made up by mainly active duty soldiers and officers.

=== Order of battle ===
The 7th Infantry Regiment peacetime strength was a total 1714 soldiers and 80 horses. The unit order of battle in 1939:

- Staff of the Regiment
  - Signal Company
  - Engineering Company
  - Ski-Bicycle Company
  - Cavalry Company
  - Building Company
  - Ambulance
- 1st Infantry Battalion
- 2nd Infantry Battalion
- 3rd Infantry Battalion
