= Battle of Määritsa =

1946 conflict in Estonia between Forest Brothers and Soviet powers

- Part of low-intensity conflict between the Soviet Union and Estonian Forest Brother partisans
| Date | 31 March – 1 April 1946 |
| Location | Osula, Estonia |
| Result | Soviet victory |

Belligerents
| Soviet Union | Estonian partisans |

Strength
| About 300 | 7 |

Casualties and losses
| None | 7 dead |
- Farmhouse destroyed

The Battle of Määritsa (Estonian: Määritsa lahing), or the Battle of Osula (Estonian: Osula lahing), took place in Osula village, at that time in Võru County, Estonia. It began on the night of 31 March 1946, involving members of the Forest Brothers and Soviet occupation forces. Seven Estonian fighters based at the Hindrik farmhouse were besieged by up to 300 Soviet soldiers. The battle lasted about seven hours before the farmhouse caught fire and the Soviets demanded that the rebels surrender. Only two fighters managed to escape alive from the farmhouse, but were subsequently killed in battle with the besiegers.
