= 406 Erna =

Main-belt asteroid

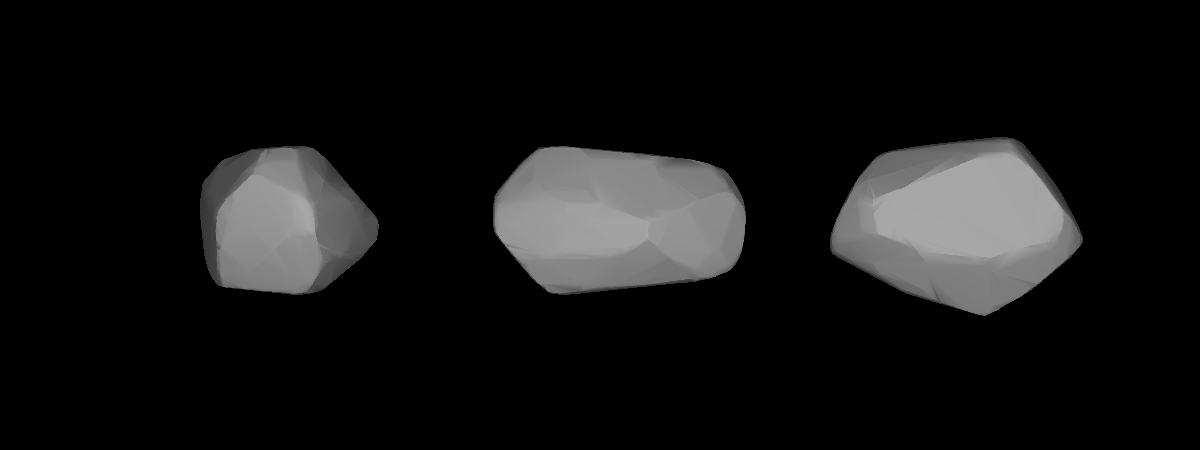
- A three-dimensional model of 406 Erna that was computed using light curve inversion techniques

Discovery
- Discovered by: A. Charlois
- Discovery site: Nice Obs.
- Discovery date: 22 August 1895

Designations
- Pronunciation: German: [ˈɛʁnaː]
- Named after: Erna Bidschof (grand-daughter of J. Palisa)
- Alternative designations: 1895 CB · 1949 KD_{1} A903 DA · A905 OB
- Minor planet category: main-belt · (outer) background

Orbital characteristics
- Epoch 4 September 2017 (JD 2458000.5)
- Uncertainty parameter 0
- Observation arc: 114.37 yr (41,772 days)
- Aphelion: 3.4439 AU
- Perihelion: 2.3861 AU
- Semi-major axis: 2.9150 AU
- Eccentricity: 0.1814
- Orbital period (sidereal): 4.98 yr (1,818 days)
- Mean anomaly: 168.93°
- Mean motion: 0° 11^{m} 52.8^{s} / day
- Inclination: 4.1920°
- Longitude of ascending node: 315.76°
- Argument of perihelion: 37.224°

Physical characteristics
- Dimensions: 41.52±10.79 km 46.145±0.732 km 46.02±0.73 km 46.266±0.310 km 47.70±0.51 km 49.19±1.7 km
- Synodic rotation period: 8.7893±0.0002 h 8.790±0.0021 h 8.79079
- Geometric albedo: 0.0524±0.004; 0.056±0.010; 0.0595±0.0047; 0.060±0.007; 0.061±0.002; 0.08±0.03
- Spectral type: Tholen = P · P B–V = 0.738; U–B = 0.273
- Absolute magnitude (H): 9.81±0.44; 10.134±0.001 (R); 10.36; 10.38

406 Erna, provisional designation 1895 CB, is a dark asteroid of the background population in the outer regions of the asteroid belt, approximately 46 kilometers in diameter. It was discovered by French astronomer Auguste Charlois at Nice Observatory on 22 August 1895. The asteroid was presumably named after Erna Bidschof, the granddaughter of Johann Palisa.

== Orbit and classification ==
Erna is a non-family asteroid from the main belt's background population. It orbits the Sun in the outer asteroid belt at a distance of 2.4–3.4 AU once every 4 years and 12 months (1,818 days). Its orbit has an eccentricity of 0.18 and an inclination of 4° with respect to the ecliptic. The body's observation arc begins at the United States Naval Observatory in September 1905, more than 10 years after its official discovery observation at Nice.

== Physical characteristics ==
In the Tholen classification, Erna is a dark and primitive P-type asteroid. It has also been characterized as such by polarimetric observations.

=== Rotation period ===
In October 2005, a rotational lightcurve of Erna was obtained from photometric observations by French and Italian astronomers Raymond Poncy (177), Roberto Crippa (A12), Federico Manzini and Silvano Casulli. Lightcurve analysis gave a well-defined rotation period of 8.7893 hours with a brightness variation of 0.35 magnitude (U=3). Another lightcurve from the Palomar Transient Factory in November 2010 gave a similar period of 8.790 hours with an amplitude of 0.35 magnitude (U=2).

=== Spin axis ===
In 2013, an international study modeled a lightcurve from various data sources including the Uppsala Asteroid Photometric Catalogue and the Palomar Transient Factory survey. The modeling gave a concurring period of 8.79079 hours and determined two spin axis in ecliptic coordinates (λ, β) of: (357.0°, −49.0°) and (161.0°, −60.0°).

=== Diameter and albedo ===
According to the surveys carried out by the Infrared Astronomical Satellite IRAS, the Japanese Akari satellite, and NASA's Wide-field Infrared Survey Explorer with its subsequent NEOWISE mission, Erna measures between 41.52 and 49.19 kilometers in diameter and its surface has an albedo between 0.0524 and 0.060.

The Collaborative Asteroid Lightcurve Link adopts the results obtained by IRAS, that is, an albedo of 0.0524 and a diameter of 49.19 kilometers based on an absolute magnitude of 10.36.

== Naming ==
This minor planet was likely named after Erna Bidschof, the granddaughter of Austrian astronomer Johann Palisa, who was one of the most prolific discoverer of minor planets at the time. Erna is the daughter of the astronomer Friedrich Bidschof (1864–1915) and his wife Helene (née Palisa).
