= Battle of Kautla =

1941 military conflict in Estonia during WW II

- Part of Operation Barbarossa during World War II
Date	24 July 1941
Location	Kautla, Estonian SSR, Soviet Union (modern day Kõrvenurga, Estonia) 59°07′38″N 25°26′42″E
Result	Soviet victory

Belligerents
Soviet Union	Estonia Forest Brothers
	Finland Estonian volunteers

Units involved
Destruction battalions	Erna long-range reconnaissance group

Strength
	59

Casualties and losses
Unknown	32 soldiers KIA or MIA
- 30 civilians murdered by the Soviets; Around 2,000 civilians fled with help of Erna force

The Battle of Kautla (Estonian: Kautla lahing, Kautla veresaun or Kautla veretöö) took place between Soviet destruction battalions and Estonian Forest Brothers in Kautla, Estonia in July 1941. It included series of murders of civilians committed by destruction battalions, known as Kautla massacre.

On 24 July 1941, an extermination battalion murdered Gustav and Rosalie Viljamaa of Simisalu farm and set the farm on fire. In the coming days, the extermination battalion undertook the systematic murder of all civilians in the region and burning their farms. The Kautla farm was burned down by the Red Army with the family and staff inside, murdering Johannes Lindemann, Oskar Mallene, Ida Hallorava, Arnold Kivipõld, Alfred Kukk and Johannes Ummus. In total, more than twenty people, all civilians, were murdered—many of them after torture—and dozens of farms destroyed. The low toll of human deaths in comparison with the number of burned farms is due to the Erna long-range reconnaissance group breaking the Red Army blockade on the area, allowing many civilians to escape.

On the night of 10 July the Erna platoon had made a landing on the northern coast of Estonia with 42 men arriving onshore and hiding in the Kautla Marshes 60 km south east of Tallinn. Another 17 team members were parachuted in on 28 July. The group's task was to perform reconnaissance deep behind Red Army lines for the Finnish Army but it turned to saving around 2,000 civilians hiding in the Kautla woods by allowing them to escape while the outnumbered Erna force engaged Soviet destruction battalions in a fierce battle on 31 July to 1 August 1941. On 4 August, the platoon was ordered to cross the frontline and terminate their activities. A total of 32 men were lost, either killed or missing in action.

== See also ==
- Soviet war crimes
