= Urn (disambiguation) =

An urn is a vase-like container.

Urn may refer to:

- Urn problem of probability theory
- Urn (album), an album by Ne Obliviscaris

The acronym URN may refer to:

- Uganda Radio Network, a Ugandan news agency
- Uniform Resource Name, an Internet identifier
- Unique Reference Number, an identifier of UK schools
- University Radio Nottingham, England
