= Boris Kumm =

Estonian politician (1897–1958)

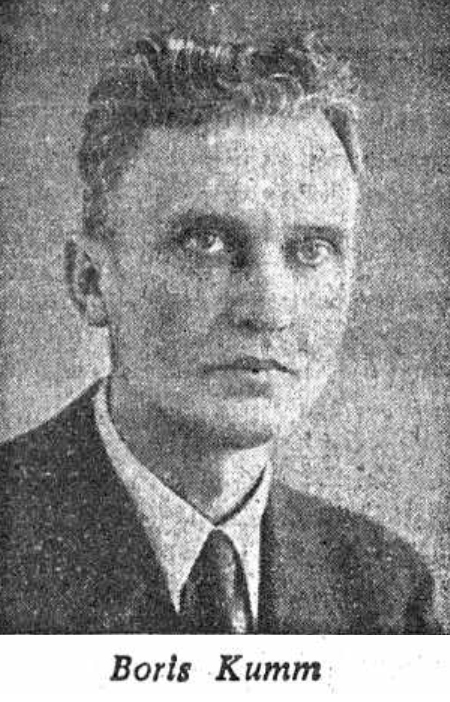
Boris Kumm.

Boris Kumm (1 September [O.S. 20 August] 1897 – 21 November 1958) was an Estonian communist politician.

== Biography ==
Kumm was born in Pärnu. From 1919 until 1920, he participated in the Estonian War of Independence. In 1923, he joined the Communist Party of Estonia (EKP), and was elected to the Riigikogu, the Estonian parliament.

After the EKP was banned in 1924, Kumm was arrested and sentenced to 15 years' hard labour. He was released in 1938. In 1938–1940 he organized the local EKP in Pärnu.

In 1940, Estonia was occupied by the Soviet Union. Kumm served as People's Commissar for Internal Affairs of the Estonian SSR in 1940–1941 and People's Commissar for State Security of the Estonian SSR in 1941.

When Nazi Germany occupied Estonia in 1941, Kumm fled to Moscow, where he continued working for the People's Commissariat for State Security. He returned to Estonia after the Red Army liberated it from German occupation in 1944. In 1945, Kumm was appointed major general of the Red Army.

Kumm again served as People's Commissar for State Security of the Estonian SSR in 1944–1950 (after 1946 as Minister for State Security). He was also a member of the Central Committee of the Communist Party of Estonia 1940–1951 and a member of the Supreme Soviet of the Soviet Union 1941–1950.

Kumm was awarded the Order of the Red Star in 1943, Order of the Red Banner in 1945 and 1949 and the Order of the Patriotic War (1st class) in 1946. He died in Tallinn.

== Sources ==
- Biography (in Russian)
