= Anna van Gogh-Kaulbach =

Dutch writer and translator

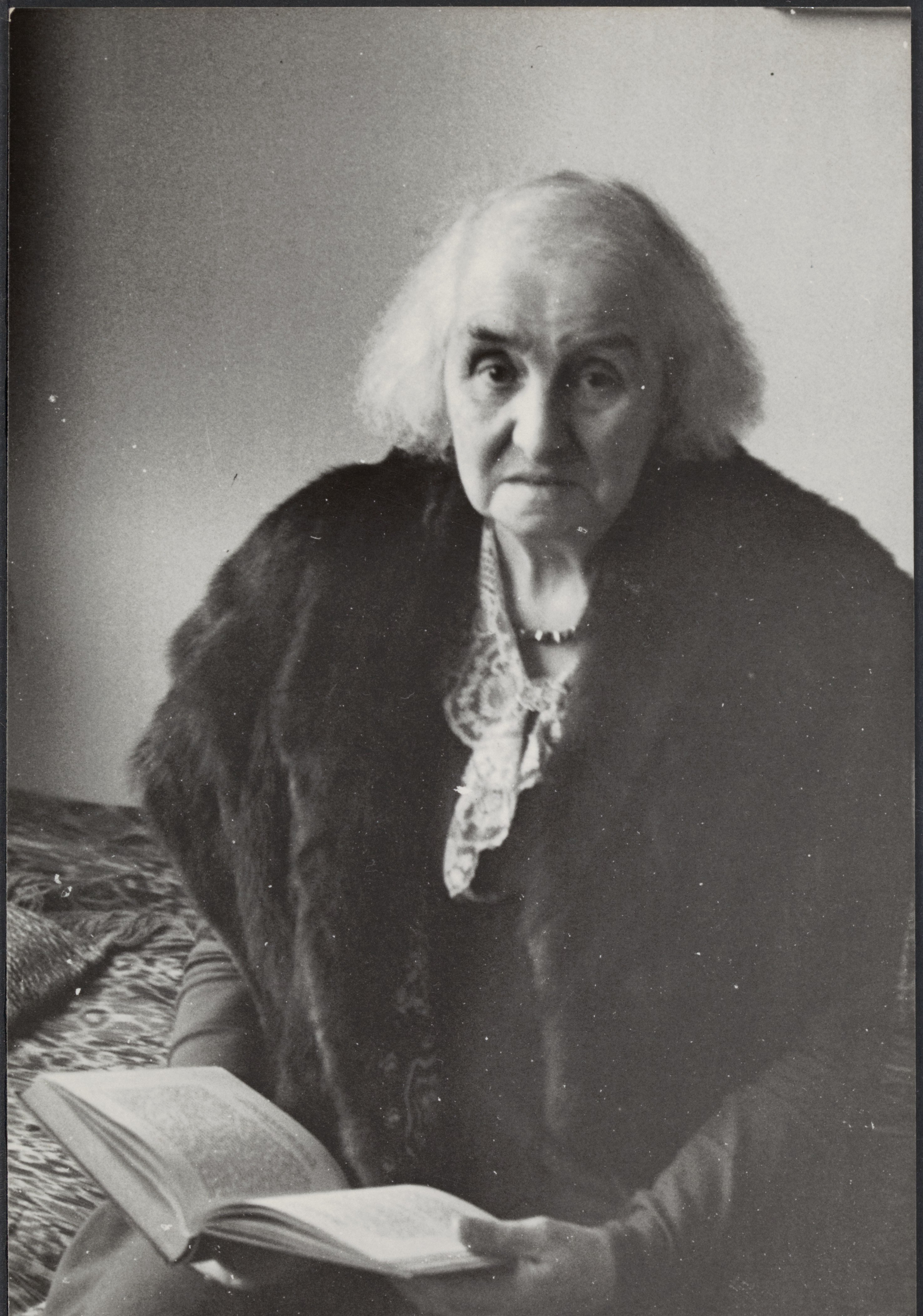
- Born: Anna Maria Kaulbach; 31 December 1869; Velsen, Netherlands
- Died: 28 January 1960 (aged 90); Haarlem, Netherlands
- Writing career
- Genres: short stories, novel, play

Anna Maria van Gogh-Kaulbach (31 December 1869 – 28 January 1960) was a Dutch writer and translator. She published a number of works under the pen names Wilhelmina Reynbach, Erna, Mac Peter and Wata.

== Biography ==
The daughter of Frans Ludwig Eduard Kaulbach, a physician, and Helena Maria Cornelia van Reijn, she was born Anna Maria Kaulbachin Velsen. Her parents had six other children who all died shortly after birth. When she was two, her mother became blind. She attended a primary girls' school in Beverwijk and a girls' Hogere Burgerschool in Haarlem. In 1892, she published her first story in Elsevier's Geïllustreerd Maandschrift. In the same year, she met her future husband Willem Jacob van Gogh, a bulb grower who was a cousin of Vincent van Gogh. In 1894, the couple joined the Social Democratic Workers' Party. In the same year, she published her first novel Albert Overberg under the pseudonym Wilhelmina Reynbach'; she published a second novel Otto van Lansveldt under the same name in the following year. Besides novels and stories, she also published plays, children's stories and travelogues.

In 1899, she married Wlllem van Gogh; the couple had two daughters and three sons. They lived in Lisse and then Sassenheim. After 1906, they lived in Haarlem. From 1919 to 1924, they lived in Arnhem; in 1924, they moved to Amsterdam. Her husband died in 1934 and she spent two years in the Dutch East Indies in 1937.

Van Gogh-Kaulbach translated works by a number of authors, including Honoré de Balzac, Charles Dickens, Fyodor Dostoevsky and Neel Doff. She also wrote and translated radio plays.

From 1910 to 1915, she was editor of Weekblad voor de jeugd, from 1915 to 1918, she was editor of Scheurkalender Morgengroeten and, from 1927 to 1931, she was editor for Letterkundige Kalender. She also wrote theatre reviews for Haarlems Dagblad and contributed articles to the Dames-Kroniek.

She was a supporter of women's suffrage and socialism. Her later works take on the themes of motherhood and family life.

She was honorary president of the Dutch women's organization Nederlandse Vrouwenbeweging. A pacifist, she was a member of the Nederlandse Vredesraad.

She died in Haarlem at the age of 90.

== Selected works ==
- Rika, novel (1905)
- Eigen haard, play (1910)
- De sterkste, novel (1913)
- Opgang. De roman van een vrouwenleven, novel (1914)
- Binnen de muren, two volumes (1915)
- Jet-Lie, novel (1917)
- Lenie ter Heuvel, youth literature, 3 volumes (1920-1922)
- Het brandende hart, novel (1928)
- Zomerland, novel (1953)
