= Armed Combat Union =

Estonian underground organization of the Forest Brothers

- Relvastatud Võitluse Liit
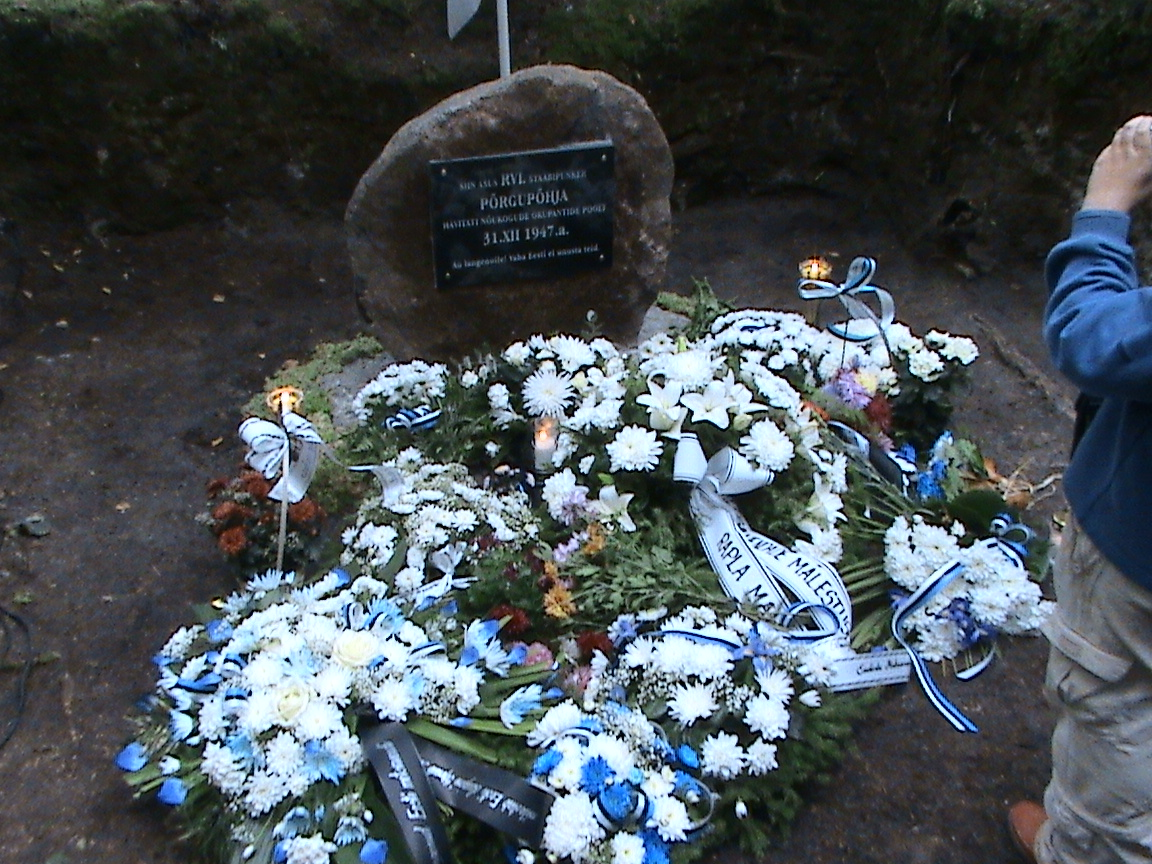
- Memorial for fallen Forest Brothers at the RVL bunker
- Abbreviation: RVL
- Formation: 1945
- Dissolved: 1949
- Legal status: Underground Resistance Organization
- Purpose: See Goals
- Headquarters: Estonia
- Leader: Endel Redlich

Armed Combat Union (Estonian: Relvastatud Võitluse Liit, abbreviation RVL) was an Estonian underground organization of the Forest Brothers established in the spring of 1946 in Läänemaa in response to the Soviet occupation. The head of the RVL was Endel Redlich.

== Goals ==
The aim of the organization was to prepare for an armed uprising in the event of a war between the United States, Britain and the USSR. Attempts were made in each city and municipality to set up their own branch organizations under the auspices of the center. You only knew the people in your organization and their nicknames. The union had its own statutes, conspiracy apartments and informants. People opposed to Soviet rule were recruited as members and had to take an oath. Leaflets and posters were distributed, shops were robbed, information about the communists was collected for later sabotage, ambushes, or infiltration.

== History ==
In the second half of 1945, several leaders of the forest brothers of Lääne County and Pärnu County began to coordinate the activities of their regiments and discuss the need for an Estonian underground resistance organization. A nationwide resistance organization was set up, called the Armed Forces Union or RVL. RVL established county organizations in Lääne County, Pärnu County, Harju County, Järva County, Tartu County, Võru County, Tallinn and Tartu. In Ida-Viru County and Viljandi County, the organization was represented as individual detachments.

The Armed Forces Union considered it important to prevent possible mass deportations. The head of the rural municipality organization had the right to arbitrarily use the force at his disposal to prevent deportation. According to the general plan, RVL's units would attack communications stations, party committees and railway stations everywhere in the event of deportation across Estonia.

About 500 members of the RVL were arrested and killed by the Soviet occupation authorities. By the decision of the Central Staff, it was subordinated only to the Government of the Republic of Estonia. It was also planned to send its delegates to Stockholm to establish official relations, but the MGB managed to arrest the selected men.

In the autumn of 1948, a decision of a special meeting of the KGB sentenced 59 people involved in the RVL to a prison camp for a longer or shorter period.

Vello Malmre was one of the leaders of the Armed Combat Union. Heino Mandri, an actor, was also convicted of participating in RVL's activities.

== Structure ==
The structure of the Armed Combat Union was built on the principle of rural municipality organizations. The aim was to create a sub-organization in each rural municipality, the activities of which were to be managed by a person elected by the Central Staff. The head of the rural municipality recruited new members within his or her own municipality, kept in touch with the active forest brothers and was accountable to the Central Staff. In the more active regions of the RVL, county leaders were also appointed, who were responsible for the rural municipality organizations of their county. A person who became a member of RVL had to fill in a questionnaire and choose a pseudonym.

The headquarters were located in Lääne County for a long time. In addition to the head and members of the staff, it included a counter-intelligence team, an economic group and a court, as well as a staff security unit.

The RVL bunker in Põrguhaua, Lääne County, was surrounded by an embankment about a meter high.

== Endel Redlich ==
Endel Redlich (7 March 1923 – 28 June 1949) was an Estonian partisan and the leader of the Armed Combat Union. In 1944, Redlich fled to the forests during Soviet re-occupation, and, in 1946, he created the RVL. Redlich died in June 1949 in a Soviet-organized ambush near Kullamaa Parish.
