= Osula, Estonia =

Village in Estonia

Osula
- Village
- Location in Estonia
- Coordinates: 57°53′00″N 26°49′40″E
- Country: Estonia
- County: Võru County
- Municipality: Võru Parish

Population (2011 Census)
  - Total: 335

Osula is a village in Võru Parish, Võru County, in southeastern Estonia. As of the 2011 census, the settlement's population was 335.

The Battle of Määritsa was held in Osula village between the Estonian partisans Forest Brothers and Soviet occupation forces on 31 March 1946.

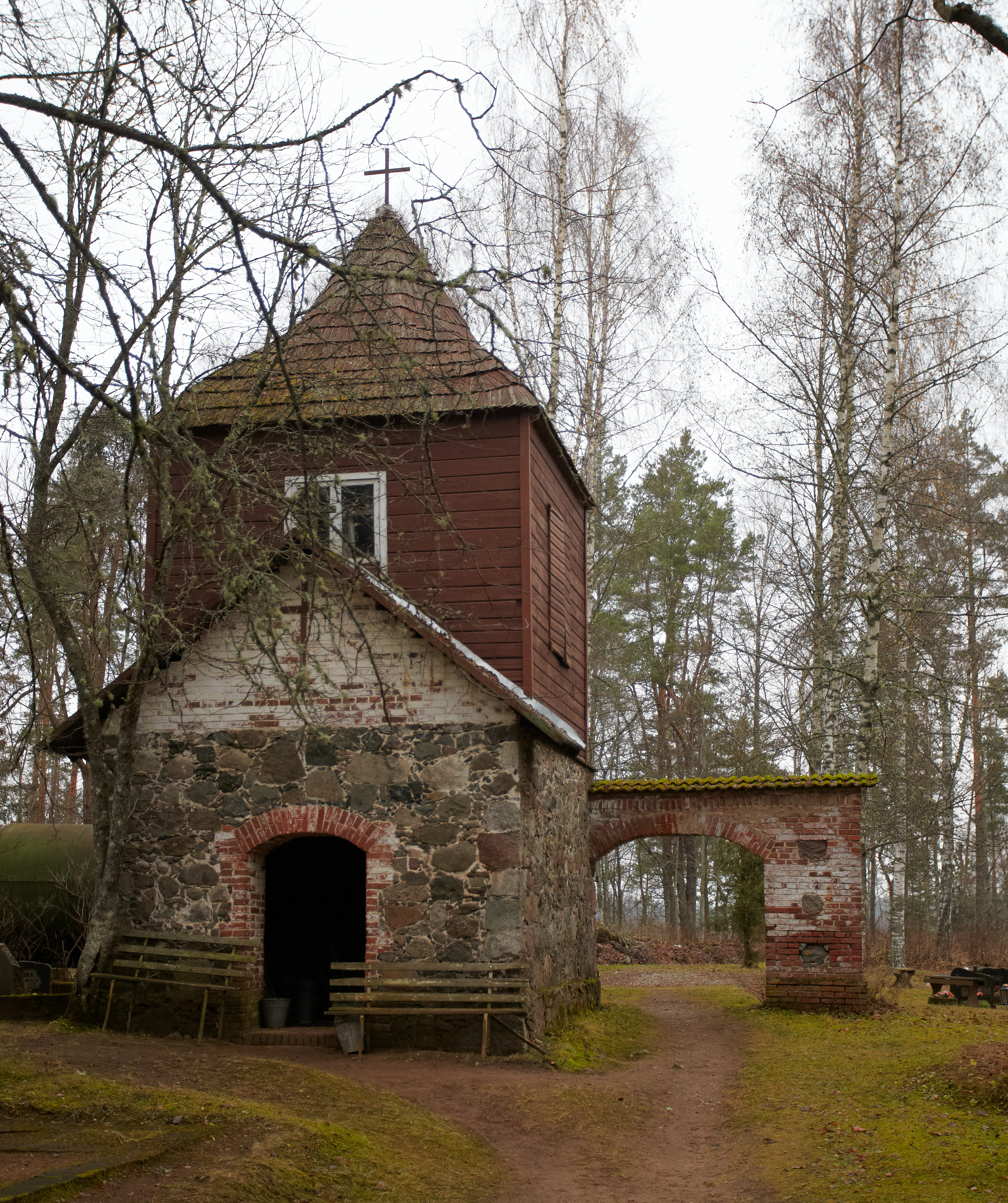
Chapel at Osula cemetery
