= Erna long-range reconnaissance group =

Finnish Army unit of Estonian volunteers during World War II

- Estonian: Erna luuregrupp
- Active: 24 July 1941 – 4 August 1941
- Country: Finland
- Type: Foreign volunteer
- Engagements: World War II: Operation Barbarossa; Battle of Kautla

Commanders
- Notable commanders: Colonel Henn-Ants Kurg

The Erna long-range reconnaissance group (Estonian: Erna luuregrupp) was a Finnish Army unit of Estonian volunteers that fulfilled reconnaissance duties in Estonia behind Red Army lines during World War II. The unit was formed by Finnish military intelligence with the assistance of German military intelligence for reconnaissance operations.

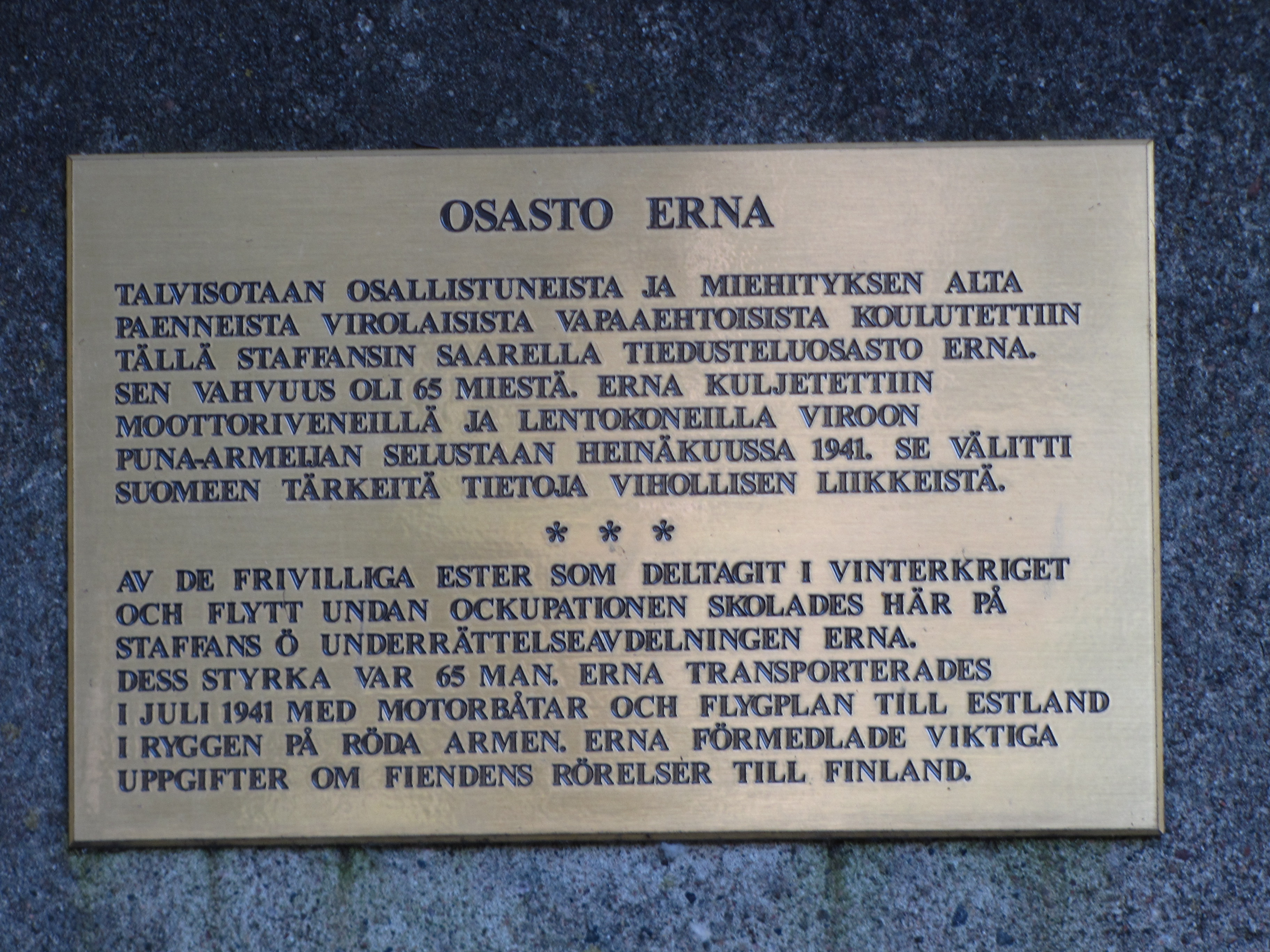
Reconnaissance group Erna memorial plaque in Espoo, Finland

== Formation of the Erna platoon ==
After the Soviet occupation of Estonia in 1940 hundreds of Estonian men went to Finland rather than accept Soviet rule. The Estonian military attaché in Finland, Major Aksel Kristian, in the spring of 1941 compiled a list of Estonians in Finland who wanted to liberate their homeland. Finnish intelligence subsequently recruited 15 volunteers and began training them on the island of Staffan in Soukka, Espoo.

On 22 June 1941 Nazi Germany invaded the Soviet Union in Operation Barbarossa. Finland re-entered the war in alliance with Germany in the Continuation War. Estonians living in Finland were assembled in Helsinki to establish a voluntary unit to go to Estonia. The platoon commander was Colonel Henn-Ants Kurg of the Estonian Army, who had been the last Estonian military attaché to France.

The Germans gave the group the name "Erna". Two German liaison officers, Oberleutnant Reinhardt and Sonderführer Schwarze, also joined the group. Erna was armed by and wore the uniform of the Finnish Army. The two Germans in charge wanted Erna to pledge allegiance to the Führer. However, Colonel Kurg strongly opposed this; he insisted that they were not Germans but Estonian volunteers, ready to co-operate, but without any commitments to Hitler. An agreement was reached that being in the service of the Finnish Army, Erna should give the oath of loyalty to Finland. Accordingly, on 24 July 1941, the 15 specially trained men and 52 volunteers took an oath of allegiance to Finland.

== Action ==
On the night of 10 July the platoon made a seaborne landing on the northern coast of Estonia with 42 men arriving onshore and hiding in the Kautla Marshes 60 km south east of Tallinn. Another 17 team members were parachuted in on 28 July. The group's task was to perform reconnaissance deep behind Red Army lines for the Finnish Army but it turned to saving around 2,000 civilians hiding in the Kautla woods by allowing them to escape while the outnumbered Erna force engaged Soviet NKVD Destruction Battalions in a fierce battle on 31 July to 1 August 1941. On 4 August, the platoon was ordered to cross the frontline and terminate their activities. A total of 32 men were lost, either killed or missing in action.

== Aftermath ==
A battalion attached to the German 311th Infantry was formed from the remnants of the original Erna platoon, with an additional 400 men, and dubbed "Erna II", but it was disbanded on 10 October 1941. With the end of the war a number of the original members of Erna continued guerrilla activities against Soviet forces, becoming Forest Brothers. The Erna Raid (Estonian: Erna retk) was an annual international military exercise and competition, commemorating the action of 1941 and held from 1995.

Soviet propagandists claimed the original Erna team participated in the mass murder of Soviet political activists. These claims were revived in the 1980s as a way of distracting historians analysing the Kautla massacre, and have been repeated in Russian media in the 2000s. Russian authorities regard the commemorative Erna Raid as "heroizing fascism".

== See also ==
- Detached Battalion 4
- Finnish Infantry Regiment 200
- Ülo Jõgi
- Erna Raid
