= Henn-Ants Kurg =

Estonian military officer and diplomat

- Born: Hans Kurg; 17 October 1898; Tallinn, Governorate of Estonia, Russian Empire
- Died: 28 December 1943 (aged 45) Tallinn Military Hospital, Tallinn
- Buried: Metsakalmistu, Tallinn
- Allegiance: Russian Empire; Estonia; Nazi Germany; Finland
- Awards: See Awards

Henn-Ants Kurg (until 1935 Hans Kurg; 17 October 1898 – 31 July 1943) was an Estonian colonel and a diplomat.

== Early life ==
Hans Kurg was born in Tallinn in 1898. Tõnu Kurg (1859–1900), his father, was a merchant from Lehtse Parish, and his mother Cäcilie Marie Aitian (1864–1944) was from Haljala. He studied at Tallinn Alexander Gymnasium from 1906 to 1916.

Kurg was the last Estonian military attaché to France before the Soviet occupation of Estonia in 1940. Estonians living in Finland formed the Erna long-range reconnaissance group, a Finnish Army unit of Estonian volunteers; Kurg was the platoon commander.

After an unsuccessful operation in Tallinn, he died in a military hospital on 28 December 1943. He was buried on 4 January 1944, in Metsakalmistu, Tallinn.

== Personal life ==
Hans Kurg married Marta Baumann in 1927, with whom he had two sons: Peet-Rein (1928) and Ivo-Mart (1931).

== Awards ==
- French Croix de guerre (1919)
- Latvian Order of Lāčplēsis, V Class (1925)
- Finnish White Rose Class I Knight (1925)
- Estonian Order of the Cross of the Eagle, III Class (1936)
- German State Iron Cross I and II
