= Extermination battalion =

Paramilitary units under the control of NKVD in the western Soviet Union

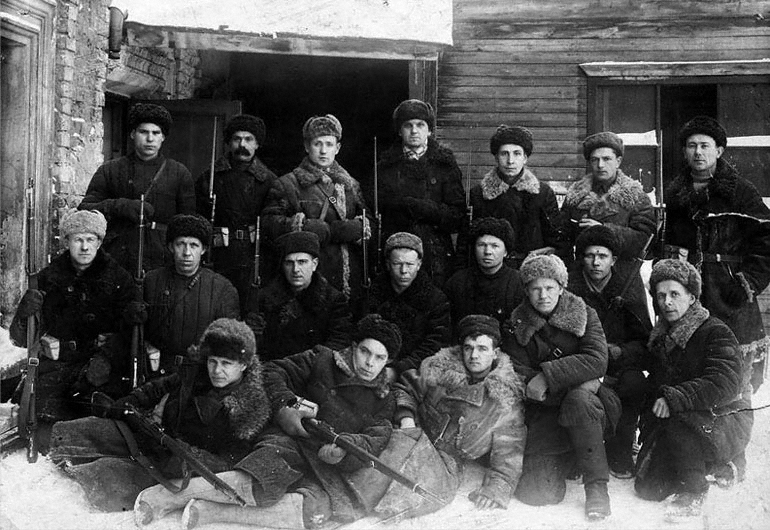
- Extermination battalion of the Tula Arms Plant, 1941
- Active: 24 June 1941 – 1954
- Country: Soviet Union
- Type: Paramilitary
- Role: Internal security
- Size: c. 328,000 (1941)
- Part of: NKVD; Soviet Armed Forces
- Anniversaries: 24 June
- Engagements: Eastern front

Commanders
- Notable commanders: Lavrentiy Beria (general command)

Extermination battalions or destruction battalions, (Note: Russian: Истребительные батальоны, Ukrainian: Винищувальні батальйони, Belarusian: Zniszczalnyja batalëny, Знішчальныя батальёны, Estonian: hävituspataljonid, Lithuanian: Naikintojų batalionai, Latvian: Iznīcinātāju bataljoni) colloquially istrebitels (истребители, "exterminators", "destroyers") abbreviated: istrebki (Russian), strybki (Ukrainian), stribai (Lithuanian), were paramilitary units under the control of NKVD in the Soviet-occupied Baltic states and western Soviet Union. They were tasked with repression and internal security on the Eastern Front and after it.

== Background ==
As Germany attacked the Soviet Union on 22 June 1941, a state of war was declared in the western regions of the country. Vladimir Tributs the Commander-in-Chief of the Baltic Fleet of the Soviet Union issued an order on 24 June 1941 warning of the paralysing actions of enemy paratrooper squads aided by the "capitalist-kulak" portions of the populations, which allegedly had a large number of weapons that had not been turned in. The officers ordered the strengthening of defences of headquarters, army units and communications. Attacking "bandits" were to be shot on the spot. The struggle against saboteurs was the responsibility of the border guard units subordinate to the NKVD (People's Commissariat of Internal Affairs of the Soviet Union).

== Authority ==
The battalions were created in the territories near the front line during Operation Barbarossa, with the missions of securing the Red Army rear, assuring the operation of strategically important enterprises and destroying the valuable property that could not be evacuated (a scorched earth policy). The units received authority to summarily execute any suspicious person.

The extermination battalions have no mercy for our enemies – bandits and other fascist cankers. They shall be not just destroyed, but sent directly under the ground, where is their right place.

In every village and settlement, the extermination battalion has a number of tasks in addition to directly breaking the enemy. With bolshevist grimness, everybody who imparts provocational rumours or generates panic, must be extirpated. Everybody, who directly or indirectly helps the enemy, must be found out and exterminated.

— What is the extermination battalion and what are its tasks.

== Formation ==
The extermination battalions were formally voluntary while actually a number of troops were forcibly recruited. They were augmented by personnel considered ideologically solid, like members of the Komsomol and kolkhoz managers. There were no other requirements, so the ranks were socially varied, sometimes including even felons. The battalions were commanded by head managers of the regional committee level.

The training of the fighters took place according to the 110-hour program of Vsevobuch, with the addition of another 30 additional hours under the special program of the Headquarters of the extermination battalions of the NKVD of the USSR.

Each extermination unit had to be armed with two light machine guns, rifles, revolvers and, if possible, grenades. But due to a lack of weapons, everything that could be used came into service - rifles (Arisaka Type 38, Lebel M1886) and machine guns (Lewis gun) of obsolete models not used in the Red Army, as well as Cossack sabers and other melee weapons.

During July 1941, a total of 1,755 extermination battalions were created, across all territories near the frontline, comprising about 328,000 personnel.

During July–August 1941 in the Byelorussian SSR, chiefly in Vitebsk, Homel, Polesia, Mohylew oblasts, 78 such battalions were created, comprising more than 13,000 personnel. Part of these were later transformed into Belarusian partisans.

The battalions were also formed in the newly annexed territories of Karelo-Finland, Estonia, Latvia, Lithuania, East Poland, Galicia, and Bessarabia. Immediately after the beginning of Operation Barbarossa, combat squads were formed. Following the orders of the NKVD, night watch squads were created in areas with large concentrations of the Forest Brothers. As firearms were not provided the nightwatchmen equipped themselves with sticks. On 25 June 1941, the first squads received firearms from the reserves of the former paramilitary organisations and through self-armament.

== Actions ==
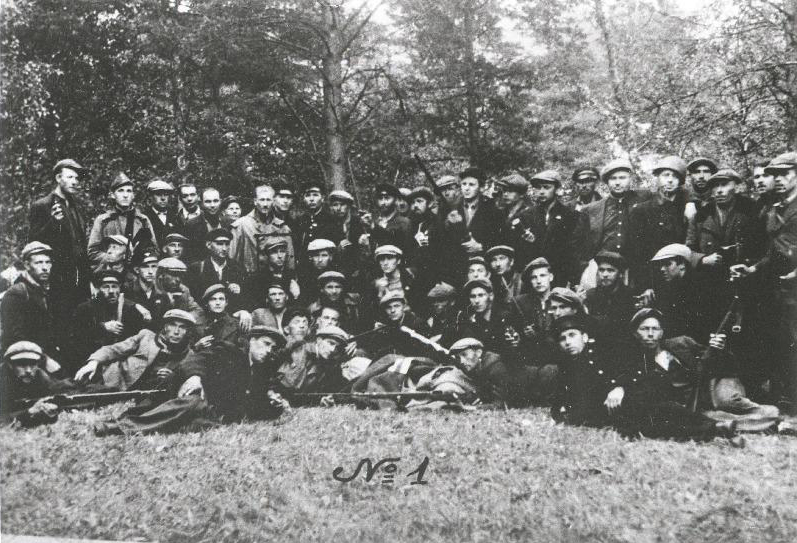
Members of an extermination battalion in Estonia, 1945–1950

The fight against anti-Soviet partisans and the implementation of the scorched earth tactics were accompanied by terror against the civilian population, which was treated as supporters or shelterers of Forest Brothers. The extermination battalions burnt down farms and some small boroughs. In turn, the members of the extermination battalions were at risk of retaliation by the anti-Soviet partisans.

=== Estonia ===
Thousands of people including a large proportion of women and children were killed, while dozens of villages, schools and public buildings were burned to the ground. A school boy, Tullio Lindsaar, had all bones in his hands broken then was bayoneted for hoisting the flag of Estonia. Mauricius Parts, son of the Estonian War of Independence veteran Karl Parts, was doused in acid. In August 1941, all residents of the village of Viru-Kabala were killed including a two-year-old child and a six-day-old infant. A partisan war broke out in response to the atrocities of the extermination battalions, with tens of thousands of men forming the Forest Brothers to protect the local population from these battalions. Occasionally, the battalions burned people alive. The extermination battalions murdered 1,850 people in Estonia. Almost all of them were partisans or unarmed civilians.

The Battle of Kautla is another example of the extermination battalions' actions, during which twenty civilians were murdered and tens of farms destroyed. Many of those killed had also been tortured. The low toll of human deaths in comparison with the number of burned farms is due to the Erna long-range reconnaissance group breaking the Red Army blockade on the area, allowing many civilians to escape.

After the Fall of the Soviet Union the battalions were deemed by the Riigikogu (Parliament of Estonia) to be a criminal entity.

== Post-war activities ==
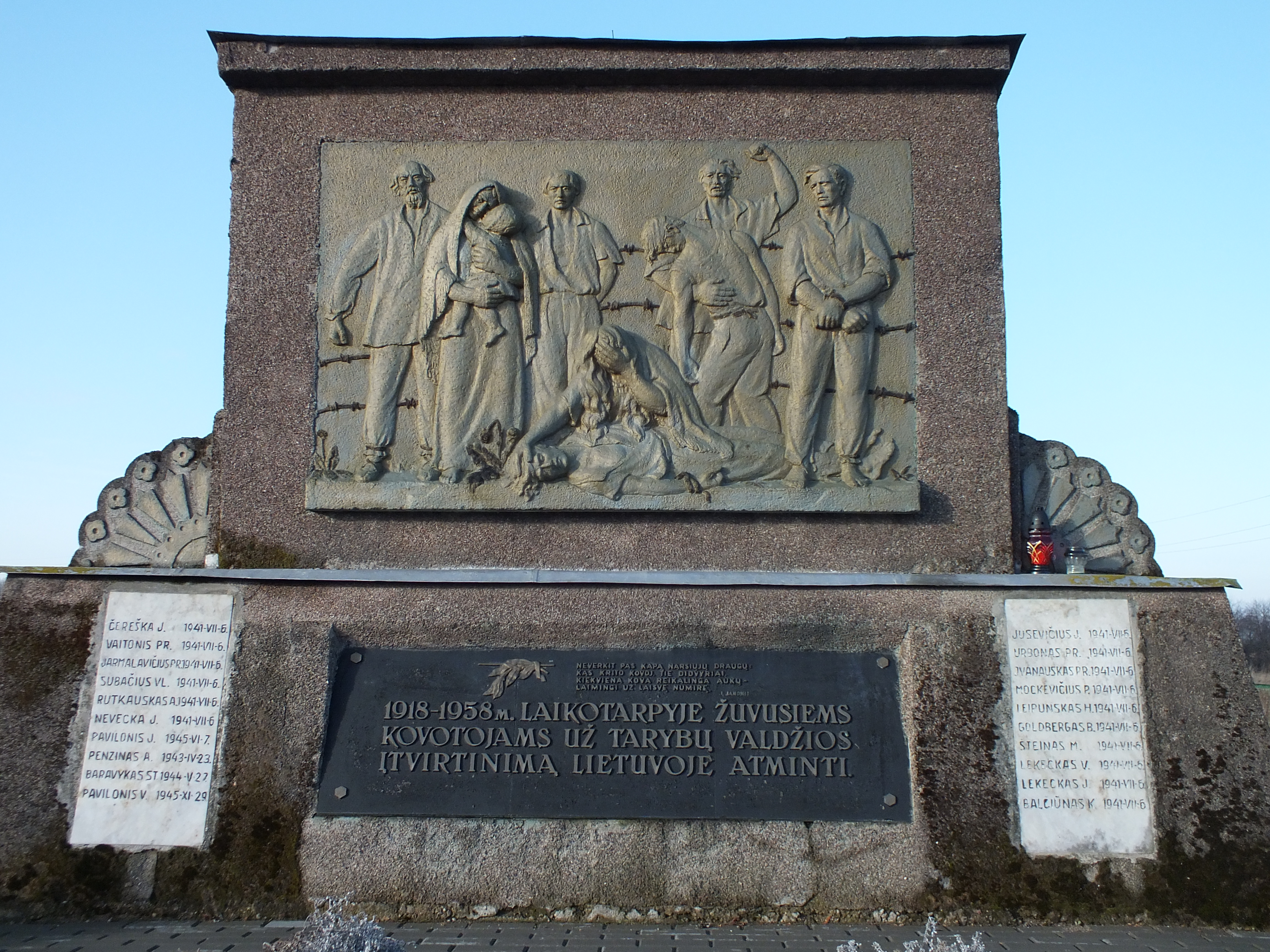
Soviet propaganda monument in Simnas dedicated to the fallen members of the extermination battalions (built during the Soviet occupation).

The extermination battalions were restored after the retreat of German forces in the newly annexed areas to the Soviet Union. In 1945–46 they were renamed to narodnaya zaschita (people's defence), because of the notoriety their old name had gained in 1941. They were formed from local volunteers, from the most variable layers of the rural communities. They were tasked to guard, secure and support with arms all activities, directives and orders of the Soviet power, which the population could have sabotaged, intentionally avoided or directly resisted.

The primary task of the extermination battalions was the fight against the armed resistance movement. This included terrorising the actual or potential supporters of Forest Brothers among the civilian population, participation in active combat, organisation of ambush and secret guard posts, reconnaissance and search patrols. The passive operations included guard and watch-keeping duties, convoy of detainees and arrested individuals as well as guarding cargo.

The destroyers systematically guarded institutions of power and economic objects in the rural areas. In a post-war situation where the factual state power in a rural municipality lay with the Soviet police, the Militsiya, the destroyers constituted a force which guaranteed the implementation of the Soviet policies. A typical task was to force the farmers to fulfil public forestry, peat extraction and road construction obligations. No measures of coercion policy were implemented in the rural communities, which were not carried out or supervised by armed destroyers. They also fought against crime, both independently and as an additional force to the Militsiya.

The extermination battalions were great in size, but they never became the efficient and active armed force which they were expected to become in order to rapidly eradicate the Forest Brothers. Despite the primarily passive role of the destroyers in the fight against the resistance movement, they provided invaluable assistance to the active participants in this fight, state security institutions and internal troops. As local people the destroyers spoke the language, knew the people, landscape and circumstances, knowledge which was inadequate among the NKVD and internal troops. The extermination battalions were also very useful as an auxiliary force. The organisation was eventually dissolved in 1954.

== Legal appraisal ==
In 2002 the Riigikogu (Parliament of Estonia) declared that the extermination battalions in the annexed Baltic states were a collaborators' organisation, which assisted the implementation of the criminal policy of the Soviet regime, and was thus a criminal organisation. At the same time, the destroyers cannot be accused of crimes against humanity in corpore, because of the legal principles of the individual character of guilt and responsibility.

== Bibliography ==
- Гісторыя Беларусі: У 6 т. Т. 5. Беларусь у 1917–1945. — Мн. : Экаперспектыва, 2006. — 613 с.; іл. ISBN 985-469-149-7. p. 482.
- Мірановіч Яўген. Найноўшая гісторыя Беларусі. — СПб. : Неўскі прасцяг, 2003. — 243 с.; іл. ISBN 5-94716-032-3. pp. 126–30.
- Вялікая Айчынная вайна савецкага народа (у кантэксце Другой сусветнай вайны). — Мн. : Экаперспектыва, 2005. — 279 с. ISBN 985-469-150-0. p. 100.

== See also ==
- Soviet war crimes
- NKVD prisoner massacres

== Footnotes and references ==
Footnotes
