= Latvian partisans =

Anti-Soviet guerrilla fighters

Latvian Partisan War
- Part of Forest Brothers and the Soviet occupation of Latvia
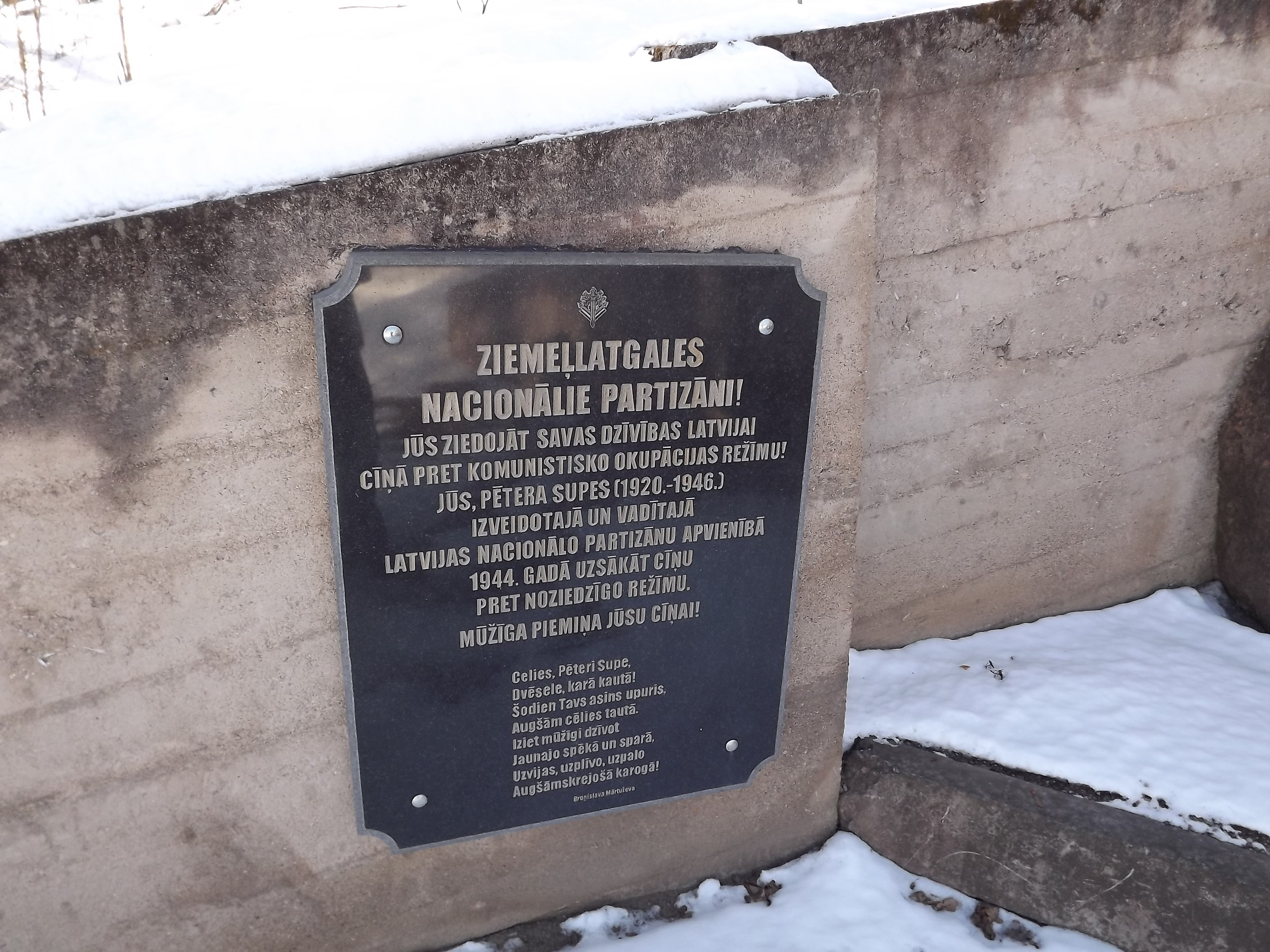
- Monument to the Latvian national partisans
Date	August 1944 – 1953
Location	Latvia
Result	Soviet victory: Soviet control over Latvia maintained; Latvian partisan movement gradually suppressed

Belligerents
Latvian national partisans	Soviet Union: NKVD; MGB; Soviet Army; Destruction battalions

Commanders and leaders
(Latvia) Roberts Rubenis †	Alfons Noviks; Vilis Lācis

Strength
12,000–13,000 participants	Unknown

Casualties and losses
2,407 killed 5,489 arrested 498 executed	1,562 killed 560 wounded

Latvian national partisans (Latvian: Nacionālie partizāni) were Latvian pro-independence partisans who waged guerrilla warfare against Soviet rule during and after the Second World War.

== Aftermath of World War I ==
The decisions of the 1917 congresses and the declaration of independence on November 18, 1918, with Latgale as part of the Latvian state, moved both the military of Latvia as well as local partisans to struggle for the liberation of Latgale. This was a difficult task, given the territorial interests of the Russian Soviet Federative Socialist Republic, Second Polish Republic, and Belarusian People's Republic. On June 10, 1919, the Lithuanian army reached the territory controlled by the partisan (Green Guard).

== Aftermath of World War II ==
Latvian national partisans waged guerrilla warfare against Soviet rule during the Soviet occupation of Latvia in 1940 during World War II, and the Latvian Soviet Socialist Republic after the war. Similar anti-Soviet resistance groups fought against Soviet rule in Estonia, Lithuania, Belarus, Poland, Romania, Hungary and Galicia (Eastern Europe).

The Red Army occupied the formerly independent Latvia in 1940–1941 and, after the period of occupation of Latvia by Nazi Germany, again in 1944–1945. As Stalinist repression intensified over the following years, thousands of residents of this country used the heavily forested countryside as a natural refuge and basis for armed anti-Soviet resistance.

Resistance units varied in size and composition, ranging from individually operating guerrillas, armed primarily for self-defence, to large and well-organised groups able to engage significant Soviet forces in battle.

== Background ==
=== Caught between two powers ===
Latvia had gained her independence in 1918 after the collapse of the Russian Empire. The ideals of self-determination had taken hold with many people as a result of having established an independent country for the first time in history. Allied declarations such as the Atlantic Charter had offered promise of a post-war world in which Latvia could re-establish itself. Having already experienced occupation by the Soviet regime followed by the Nazi regime, many people were unwilling to accept another occupation.

In the first weeks of Operation Barbarossa Latvia was overrun by German Army Group North. The German advance had been so swift that thousands of Red Army troops had been by-passed without taking them as prisoners. Thousands of Latvians joined partisan units which were organized by Latvian officers in the rear of the Soviet front line. The Latvians now collected the Reds and sometimes fought fierce battles with those who resisted. The national partisans ahead of the German front line took Sigulda on July 2 (two days before the Germans). On July 4, partisans of former Aizsargi and 24th Territorial Corps soldiers of about 170 to 180 men under the leadership of Lieutenant Colonel Arvīds Reke invaded and temporarily occupied Limbaži. They secured Alūksne on July 5, but that evening strong Red Army forces, retreating from the Germans, reached the town, and the partisans withdrew without a fight. The next morning the Reds departed, and the partisans re-occupied the town. The Germans occupied Alūksne on July 7. At the village of Mālupe the partisans attacked the headquarters of the 183rd Rifle Division, killing its commander and several staff officers and capturing their supplies and transportation. By July 8 the Red Army had retreated beyond the Latvian border.

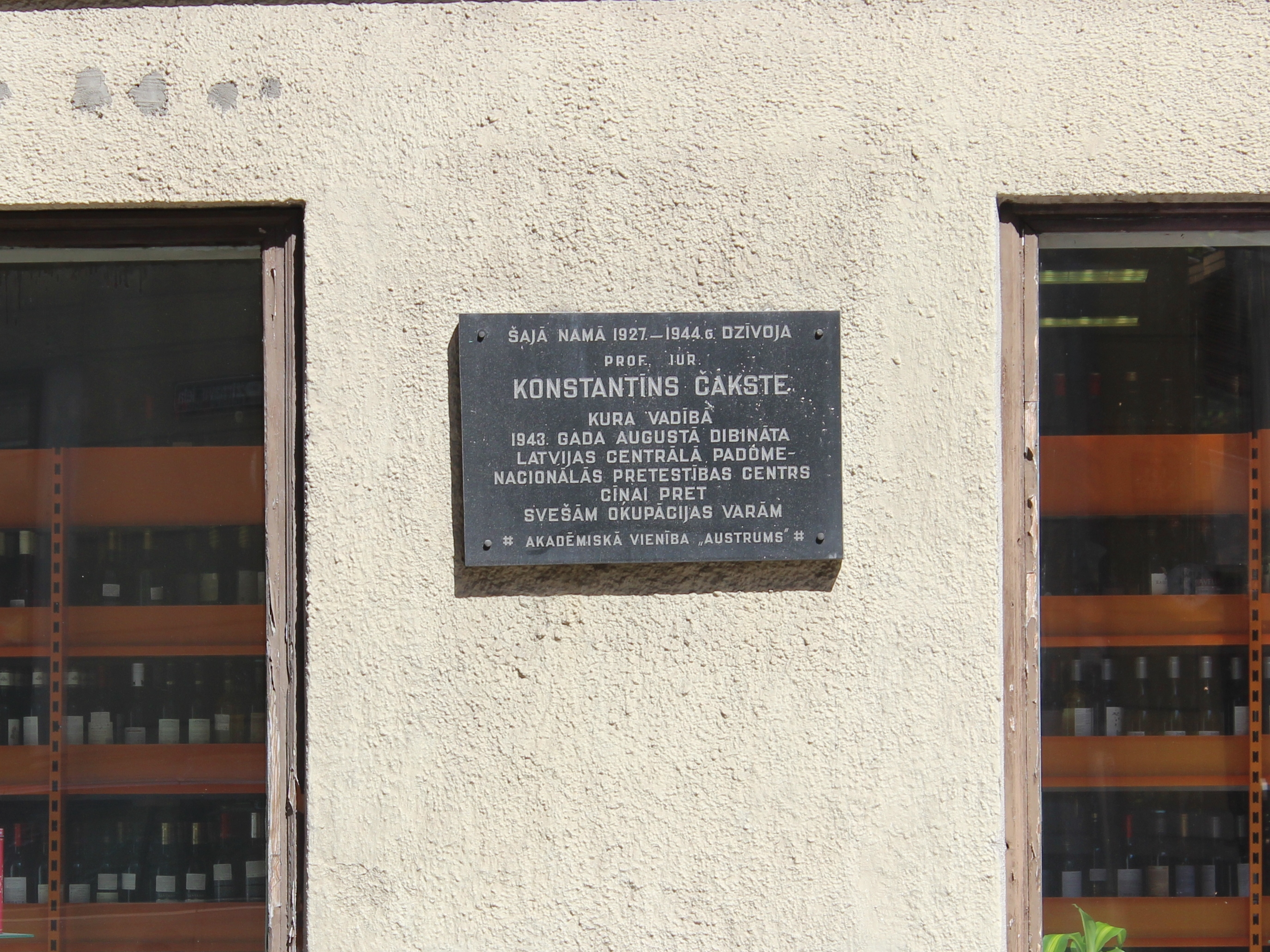
Commemorative plaque to Konstantīns Čakste, LCP leader, in Riga

Preparations for partisan operations in Courland were begun during the German occupation, but the leaders of these nationalist units were arrested by Nazi authorities. Longer-lived resistance units began to form during the last months of the war; their ranks were composed of a good number of Latvian Legion soldiers as well as civilians. On 8 September 1944 in Riga, the leadership of the Latvian Central Council adopted a Declaration on the restoration of the State of Latvia. The adoption of the Declaration was an attempt to restore de facto independence to the Republic of Latvia, in hopes of international support and by taking advantage of the interval between changes of occupying powers. The Declaration prescribed that the Satversme is the fundamental law of the restored Republic of Latvia, and provided for establishment of a Cabinet of Ministers that would organise the restoration of the State of Latvia.

Some of the most prominent LCC accomplishments are related to its military branch – General Jānis Kurelis group (the so-called "kurelieši") with Lieutenant Roberts Rubenis battalion which carried out the armed resistance against Waffen SS forces.

The partisan operations in Latvia had some basis in Hitler's authorisation of a full withdrawal from Estonia in mid-September 1944—and in the fate of Army Group Courland, among the last of Hitler's forces to surrender after it became trapped in the Courland Pocket on the Latvian peninsula in 1945. After the capitulation of Germany on May 8, 1945, approximately 4000 legionaries went to the forests. Others, such as Waffen SS commanders Alfons Rebane and Alfrēds Riekstiņš escaped to the United Kingdom and Sweden and participated in Allied intelligence operations in aid of the partisans.

The ranks of the resistance swelled with the Red Army's attempts at conscription in Latvia after the war, with fewer than half the registered conscripts reporting in some districts. The widespread harassment of disappearing conscripts' families pushed more people to evade authorities in the forests. Many enlisted men deserted, taking their weapons with them.

== The partisan war ==
There was no significant support to the national partisans from the West. Most of the agents sent by the Western- British (MI6), American, and Swedish secret intelligence services in a period from 1945 to 1954 (about 25 agents) were arrested by KGB and could not get into contact with partisans. And also this poor support diminished significantly after MI6's Operation Jungle was severely compromised by the activities of British spies (Kim Philby and others) who forwarded information to the Soviets, enabling the KGB to identify, infiltrate and eliminate many Latvian partisan units and cut others off from any further contact with Western intelligence operatives.

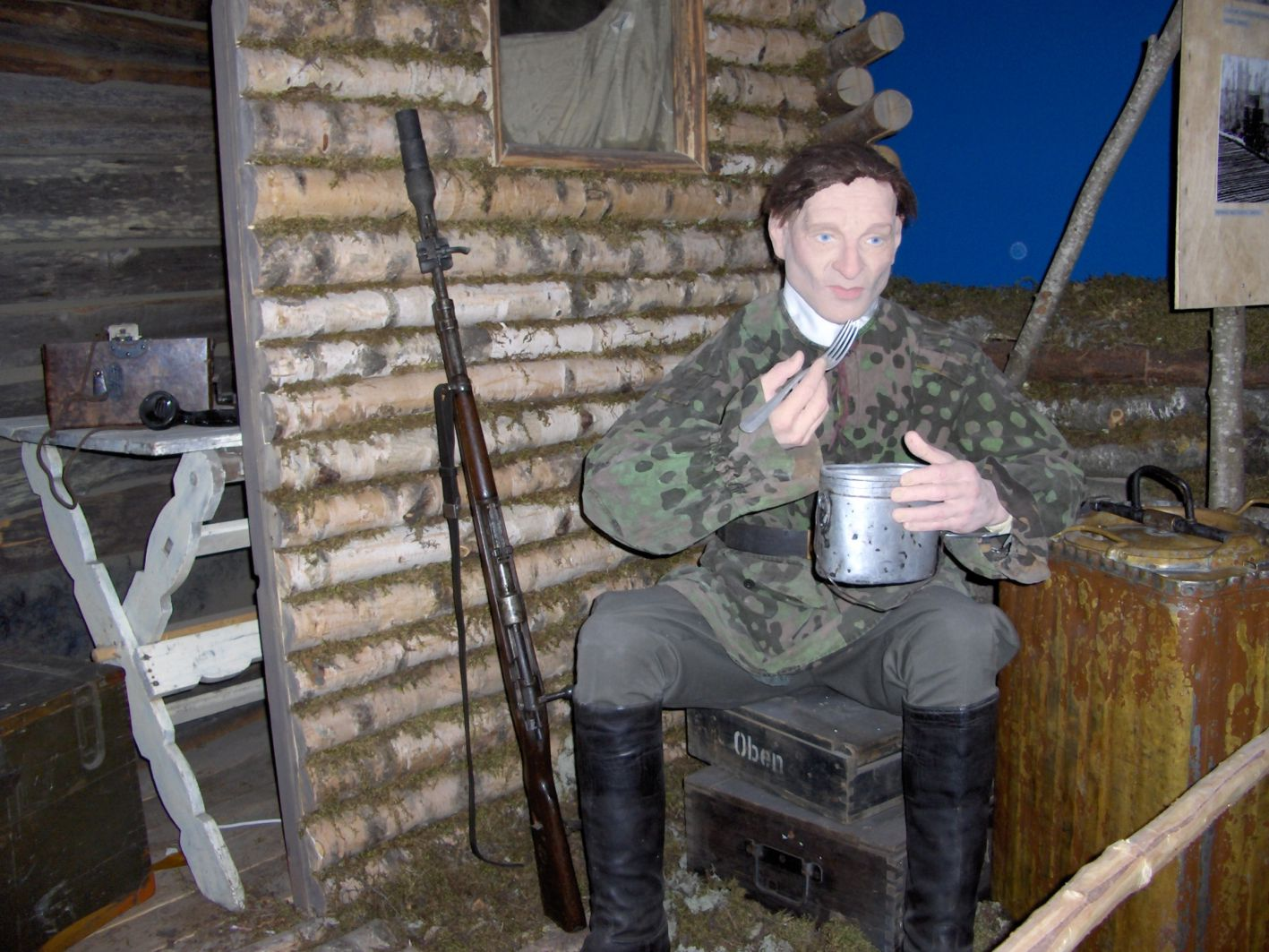
A mannequin of a Latvian national partisan in the Latvian War Museum, 2006.

The conflict between the Soviet armed forces and the Latvian national partisans lasted over a decade and cost at least thousands of lives. Estimates for the number of fighters in each country vary. Misiunas and Taagepera estimate that figures reached between 10,000 and 15,000 in Latvia.

The number of active combatants peaked at between 10,000 and 15,000, while the total number of resistance fighters was as high as 40,000. One author gives a figure of up to 12,000 grouped in 700 bands during the 1945–55 decade, but definitive figures are unavailable. Over time, the partisans replaced their German weapons with Russian ones. The partisan organizations which attempted to unite and coordinate their activities were the Latvian National Partisan Association in Vidzeme and Latgale, the Northern Courland Partisan Organization, Latvian National Partisan Organization in Courland, Latvian Defenders of the Homeland (partisan) Association in Latgale and the "Fatherland Hawks" in Southern Courland. In some 3,000 raids, the partisans inflicted damage on uniformed military personnel, party cadres (particularly in rural areas), buildings, and ammunition depots. Communist authorities reported 1,562 Soviet personnel killed and 560 wounded during the entire resistance period.

The Latvian national partisans were most active in the border regions. The forests hid the partisan dugouts, their workshops for weapons, their printing presses for leaflets and underground newspapers. Areas where they were most active included Abrene district, Ilūkste, Dundaga, Taurkalne, Lubāna, Aloja, Smiltene, Rauna and Līvāni. In the Northern regions, they had ties with Estonian Forest Brothers. As in Estonia, the partisans were killed off and infiltrated by the MVD and NKVD over time, and as in Estonia, Western assistance and intelligence was severely compromised by Soviet counter-intelligence and Latvian double agents such as Augusts Bergmanis and Vidvuds Šveics.

=== Decline of the resistance movements ===
To destroy the partisan base of support, a major Soviet deportation of civilians took place in March 1949. Most part of supporters were deported and others were forced to join kolkhozes. By the early 1950s, the Soviet forces had eradicated most of the Latvian national resistance. Intelligence gathered by the Soviet spies in the West and KGB infiltrators within the resistance movement, in combination with large-scale Soviet operations in 1952 managed to end the campaigns against them. The Soviets gradually consolidated their rule in the cities, help from rural civilians was not as forthcoming, and special military and security units continued to be sent to control the partisans.

Many of the remaining national partisans laid down their weapons when offered an amnesty by the Soviet authorities after Stalin's death in 1953, although isolated engagements continued into the 1960s. By some accounts, the last groups emerged from the forest and surrendered to the authorities in 1956–1957. Possibly, the last of the national partisan groups was one of three men that had been operating since 1944 under the leadership of Polish-Latvian fighter Staņislavs Zavadskis (nom de guerre “Pans”) in Cesvaine district, received a special invitation from Latvian SSR KGB chairman Jānis Vēvers. In exchange for laying down arms, the members were granted amnesty and permission for Zavadskis to join his mother in the Polish People's Republic. Zavadskis later lived in Łódź without persecution, and his comrades Pēteris Tirzītis and Ivars Grabāns worked at a kolkhoz near Cesvaine. After the Prague Spring in 1968, however, Tirzītis and Grabāns were sent to prison for several years.

One of the last known individual guerrillas to “legalise” himself in December 1959, was Arnolds Spārns, who had fought in the area of Priekule. Some individual guerrillas are reported to have remained in hiding and evaded capture into the 1980s, by which time Latvia was pressing for independence through peaceful means (Baltic Way, Singing Revolution). Latvia restored its independence in 1990-1991.

== Aftermath, memorials and remembrances ==
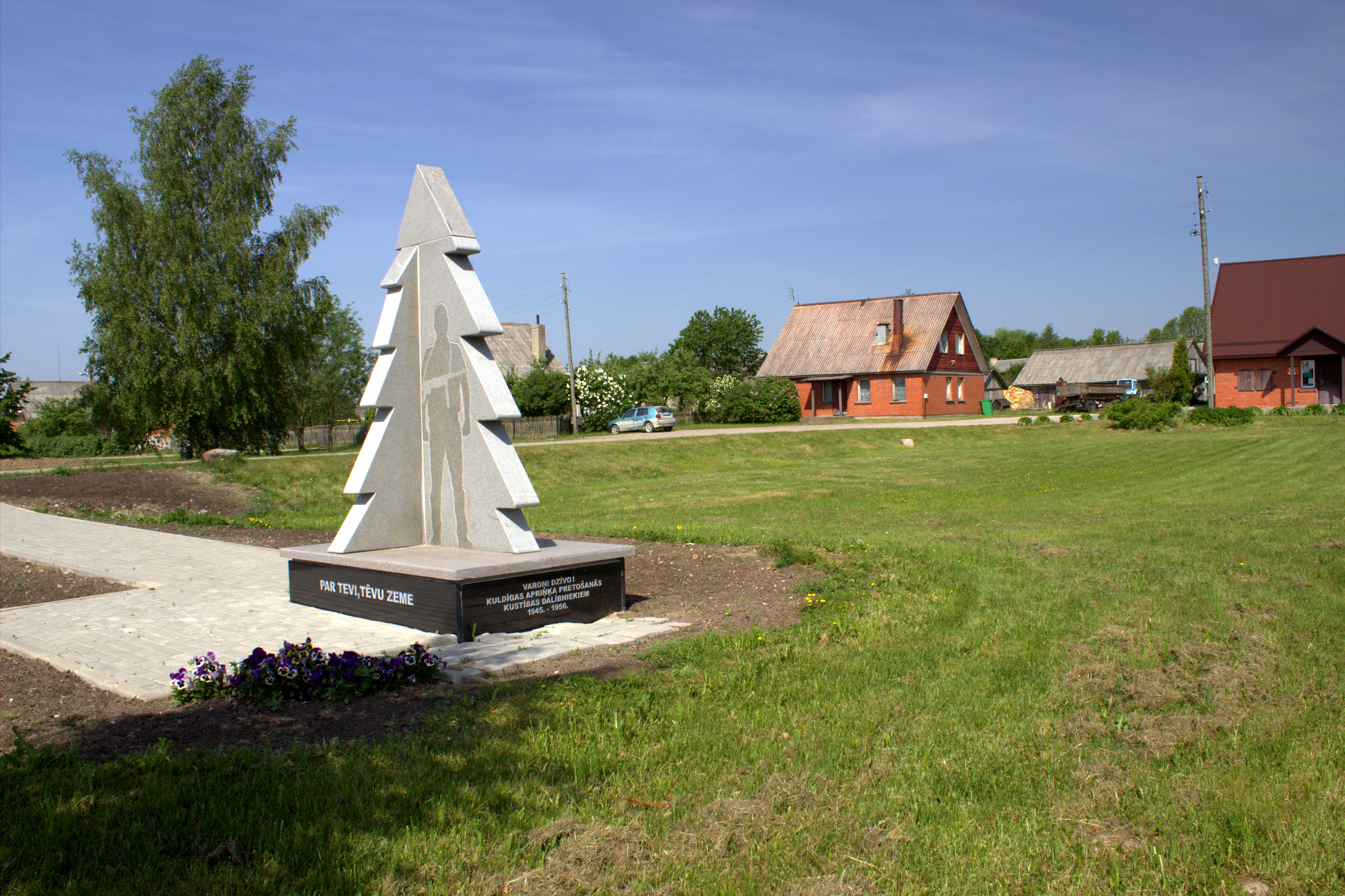
Memorial site of National Partisans in Ķikuri, Turlava Parish, Kuldīga Municipality

Many Latvian national partisans persisted in the hope that Cold War hostilities between the West, which never formally recognized the Soviet occupation, and the Soviet Union might escalate to an armed conflict in which Latvia would be liberated. This never materialised, and according to Laar many of the surviving former Forest Brothers remained bitter that the West did not take on the Soviets militarily. (See also Yalta Conference, Western betrayal)

As the conflict was relatively undocumented by the Soviet Union (the Latvian fighters were never formally acknowledged as anything but "bandits and illegals"), some consider it and the Soviet-Latvian conflict as a whole to be an unknown or forgotten war.

== Trivia ==
The last known "Forest Brother" is Jānis Pīnups who become a legal citizen again only on 9 May 1995. He started to live in the forests in 1944 as a member of a resistance organization called "Don't Serve the Occupier Army". Jānis Pīnups never had a Soviet passport and his legal status was nonexistent during the era of Soviet occupation. His hideaway was located in the forests of the Preiļi district, Pelēči Parish. In 1995, after learning that the ex-Soviet army had finally left Latvia, he left his hideout and reported to the local police station. After this, a new passport of the Republic of Latvia was issued to Jānis Pīnups, with him later telling the newspaper Diena that he has said that he's waiting for a moment when he can see Riga – the capital of once-again-independent Latvia.

== See also ==
- Forest Brothers
- Soviet partisans in Latvia
- Anti-Soviet partisans
- Kārlis Mūsiņš
