= America's Forgotten War =

America's Forgotten War may refer to:

- War of 1812 (1812–1815)
- Apache Wars (1851–1900)
- First Barbary War (1801–1805)
- Second Barbary War (1815)
- Philippine–American War (1899–1913)
- Boxer Rebellion (1899–1902)
- Korean War (1950–1953)

== See also ==
- Forgotten war (disambiguation)
