= Pranas Končius =

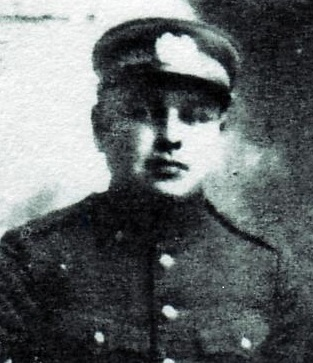
Pranas Končius

Pranas Končius code name Adomas (born in 1911 in Bargaliai, Kretinga district) was the last anti-Soviet Lithuanian partisan killed in action. He was shot by MVD forces on July 6, 1965 (or according to other sources shot himself in order not to be captured on July 13). There still were remaining anti-Soviet partisans, who legalised themselves later or lived illegally for decades to come.

Before World War II, Končius served in the Lithuanian Army. He also participated in the anti-Soviet June Uprising in 1941. In 2000, Končius was posthumously awarded the Cross of Vytis. In September 2015, President of Lithuania Dalia Grybauskaitė signed a decree which took away the award due to him being involved in the Holocaust.

Končius was implicated in the massacre of about 100 Jewish men at the Salantai Jewish cemetery and the shootings of 11 Jews at the Šalynas Manor while he served in the Salantai Auxiliary Police. He and other police officers led 70 Jewish women from Salantai to the site of their mass murder in the Šateikiai Forest, beat them with rifle butts, kicked them and participated in shooting them. He was also implicated in the massacre of 150 Jewish women and children in the Šateikiai Forest, and the seizure of their property. Končius was also accused of looting from civilians and Soviet activists in the post-war period.

== See also ==
- Site of the Jewish Massacre and Grave in Salantai
