= Alfons Noviks =

Latvian politician

Alfons Noviks (Russian: А́льфонс Андре́евич Но́вик; February 13, 1908 – March 12, 1996) was a Latvian Soviet state security official and politician.

== Biography ==
Noviks was born in Silagaiļi village, Mihailova Parish, Ludza county (now Mērdzene Parish, Ludza Municipality) the family of a small-landowner farmer. Already in the 1920s, he was recruited into the work of the Soviet intelligence services. He was expelled from the Aglona Gymnasium in 1926 for his communist activities. He studied at the Faculty of History and Philosophy of the University of Latvia, without graduating. From 1928 he worked in customs, later as a clerk in construction. In December 1930, he was admitted to the Progressive Party of Latgale, while in July 1932 he joined the then illegal Communist Party of Latvia. From 1932 to 1933 he served in the compulsory service of the Latvian Army. From August 1933 he worked for the Communist party in Daugavpils, but was arrested in November and later sentenced to eight years of hard labor. He received an amnesty in November 1938. From March 1939 he worked as a warehouse manager.

After the occupation of Latvia in June 1940, Noviks was appointed head of the State Security Department of the Ministry of the Interior and a member of the collaborationist People's Saeima. After the annexation of Latvia into the USSR, he became the head of the People's Commissariat of Internal Affairs (NKVD) of the Latvian SSR. From February 26, 1941, he was the State Security Commissioner of the Latvian SSR. From 1940 to 1954, he was a member of the Supreme Soviet of the Soviet Union. After the attack of Nazi Germany on the Soviet Union, he worked in the central NKVD apparatus and headed the department of Soviet Latvia. After the re-entry of the Red Army into Latvia, Noviks again became the head of the Latvian SSR's People's Commissariat of Internal Affairs. From September 9, 1945, he was a Major General and led campaign against the remaining Forest Brothers. After Stalin's death in 1953, he became Vice Minister of the Ministry of Industry of the Latvian SSR. In January 1954, he served as Deputy Minister of Agriculture of the Latvian SSR. Noviks retired in 1955 and lived near Mežaparks in Riga.

After the restoration of Latvia's independence, Noviks was arrested on March 15, 1994. On December 13, 1995, he was sentenced to life imprisonment for genocide and crimes against humanity - having signed orders for the Soviet deportations from Latvia from 1949 to 1953. He died while serving his sentence at Riga Central Prison on March 12, 1996.
