= Guerrilla war in the Baltic states =

Anti-Soviet resistance during and after World War II

- Part of the occupation of the Baltic states and the anti-communist insurgencies in Central and Eastern Europe
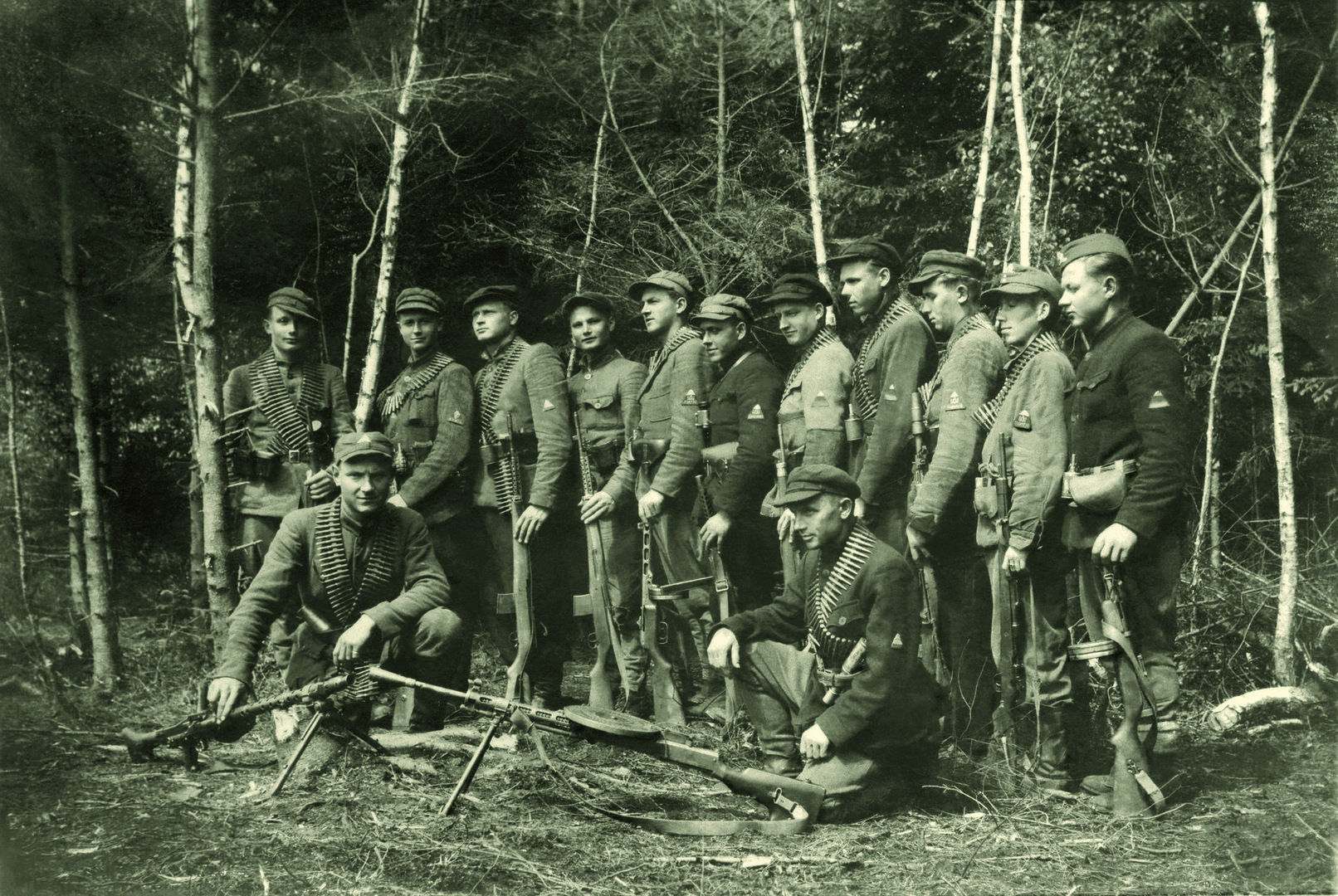
- Lithuanian partisans of the Tauras military district
Date	1944–1956
Location	Baltic states
Result	Soviet victory

Belligerents
Soviet Union; Lithuanian SSR; Latvian SSR; Estonian SSR	Baltic Partisan; Lithuanian partisans; Latvian partisans; Estonian partisans

Commanders and leaders
(Soviet Union) Hovhannes Bagramyan	(Lithuania) Adolfas Ramanauskas (executed) (Latvia) Roberts Rubenis † (Estonia) Endel Redlich †

Strength
110,000	55,000: Lithuania: 30,000; Latvia: 15,000; Estonia: 10,000

Casualties and losses
13,000–20,000 killed: Lithuania: 12,921 casualties; Latvia: 1,562 killed; 560 wounded	20,000–30,000 killed: Lithuania: 20,000 arrested
- Lithuania: at least 4,000 civilians who collaborated with the Soviets were killed by partisans; more than ~300,000 Lithuanians, Latvians and Estonians were exiled to Siberia.

The guerrilla war in the Baltic states was an insurgency waged by Baltic (Latvian, Lithuanian and Estonian) partisans against the Soviet Union from 1944 to 1956. Known alternatively as the "Forest Brothers" or "Forest Sisters" (sometimes referred to as the "Brothers of the Wood" and the "Forest Friars",Estonian: metsavennad, Latvian: mežabrāļi, Lithuanian: žaliukai), these partisans fought against invading Soviet forces during their occupation of the Baltic states during and after World War II. Notable fighters included Evi Mihkelson, Kalev Arro, Pranas Končius, Juozas Lukša, Jānis Pīnups, Benediktas Mikulis, and Izabelė Vilimaitė. Similar insurgent groups resisted Soviet occupations in Bulgaria, Poland, Romania, and Ukraine.

Soviet forces, consisting primarily of the Red Army, occupied the Baltic states in 1940, completing their occupation by 1941. After a period of German occupation during World War II, the Soviets reoccupied the Baltic States from 1944 to 1945. As Soviet political repression intensified over the following years, tens of thousands of partisans from the Baltics began to use the countryside as a base for an anti-Soviet insurgency.

According to some estimates, at least 50,000 partisans (10,000 in Estonia, 10,000 in Latvia, and 30,000 in Lithuania) in addition to their supporters were involved in the insurgency. The partisans continued to carry out an armed struggle until 1956, when the superiority of the Soviet security forces, largely in the form of secret agents which infiltrated the partisan groups, caused the Baltic population to change tactics and resort to civil resistance for the next three decades, culminating in the Singing Revolution from 1987 to 1991.

== Background ==
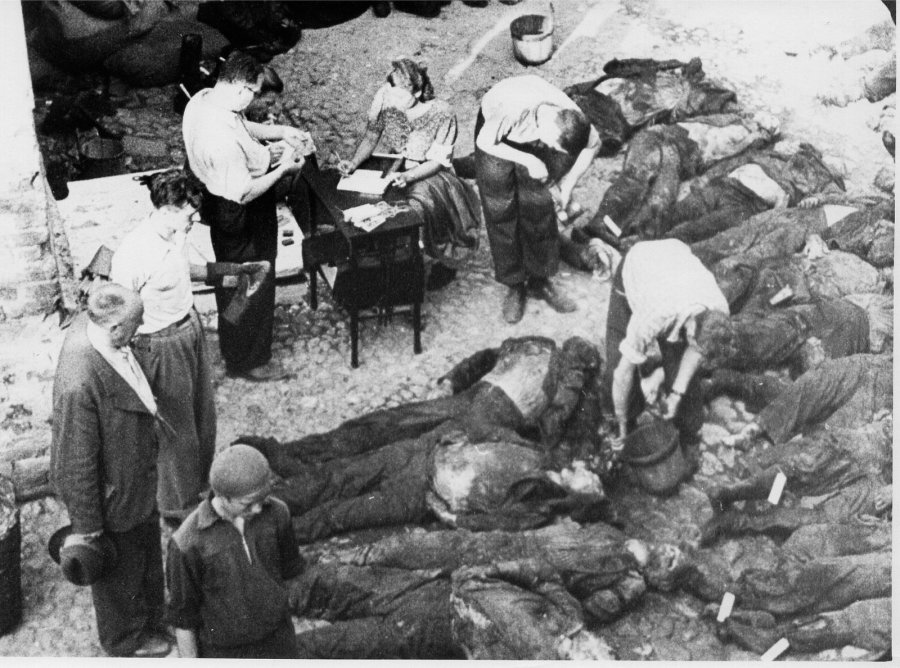
Exhumed victims of the 1941 NKVD prisoner massacre in Tartu

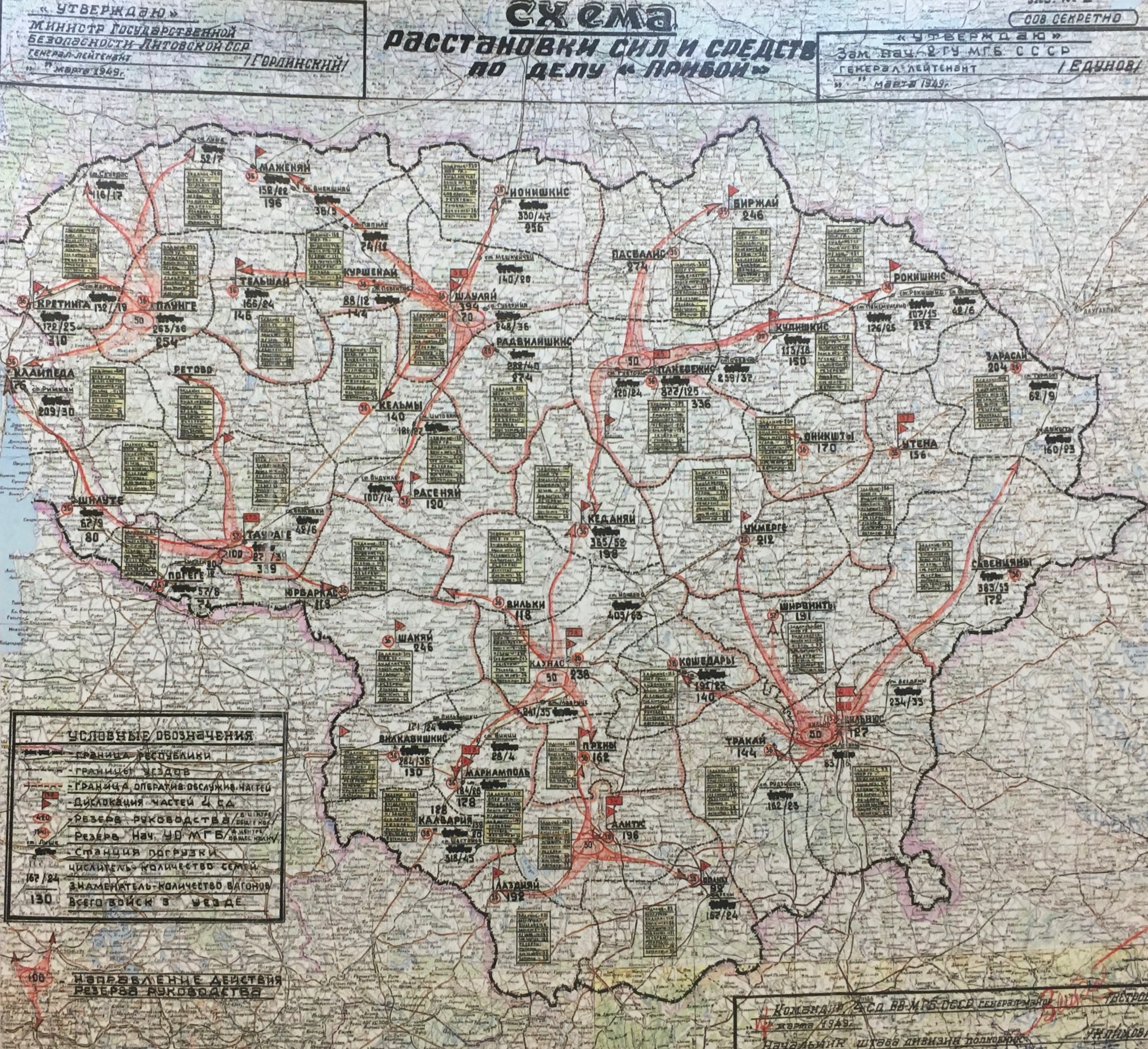
The plan for deportations of Lithuanian civilians during Operation Priboi

The term Forest Brothers first came into use in the Baltic region in the 1905 Russian Revolution. Varying sources refer to the forest brothers of this era either as peasants revolting or as schoolteachers seeking refuge in the forest. The term Forest Brothers was used and known only in occupied Estonia and Latvia. In Lithuania partisans were called žaliukai (Green People), miškiniai (Forest People) or just partizanai (partisans).

Estonia, Latvia, and Lithuania gained their independence in 1918 after the collapse of the Russian Empire. The ideals of nationalism and self-determination had taken hold with many people as a result of the independence of Estonia and Latvia for the first time since the 13th century. Lithuanians re-established a sovereign state with a rich former history, the largest country in Europe during the 14th century, occupied by the Russian Empire since 1795.

In the aftermath of the Molotov–Ribbentrop Pact, all three Baltic states were occupied by the Soviet Union in 1940, a move that the Western Allies deemed illegitimate. When Nazi Germany broke the pact and invaded the Soviet Union, the Soviet Red Army was driven out of the Baltics and the area came under German military occupation. After the departure of Soviet troops from the region, formal independence to the Baltic states was not restored by Germany. Meanwhile, Allied declarations such as the Atlantic Charter offered promise of a post-war world in which the three Baltic states could re-establish themselves. Having already experienced occupation by the Soviet regime then the Nazi regime, many people were unwilling to accept another occupation at the end of the war.

Unlike Estonia and Latvia, where the Germans conscripted the local population into military formations within the Waffen-SS, Lithuania never had a Waffen-SS division. In 1944, the German authorities created an ill-equipped but 20,000-man strong Lithuanian Territorial Defense Force under General Povilas Plechavičius to combat Soviet partisans led by Antanas Sniečkus. The Germans came to see this force as a nationalist threat to their occupation. Its senior staff were arrested on 15 May 1944, and Plechavičius was deported to a concentration camp in Salaspils, Latvia, but later in August 1944 released and remained under the supervision of the Gestapo. Approximately half the remaining forces formed guerrilla units and dissolved into the countryside to prepare for partisan operations against the Red Army as the Eastern Front approached.

Guerrilla operations in Estonia and Latvia had some basis in Adolf Hitler's authorization to withdraw from Estonia in mid-September 1944 – he allowed soldiers of his Estonian forces, primarily the 20th Waffen-SS Division (1st Estonian) who wished to stay and defend their homes to do so – and in the fate of Army Group Courland, among the last of Hitler's forces to surrender after it became trapped in the Courland Pocket on the Courland Peninsula in 1945. Many Estonian and Latvian soldiers, and a few Germans, evaded capture and fought as Forest Brothers for years after the war. Others such as Alfons Rebane and Alfrēds Riekstiņš escaped to the United Kingdom and Sweden and participated in Allied intelligence operations in aid of the Forest Brothers. While the Waffen-SS was found guilty of war crimes and other atrocities and declared a criminal organization after the war, the Nuremberg trials explicitly excluded conscripts in the following terms:

The Tribunal declares to be criminal within the meaning of the Charter the group composed of those persons who had been officially accepted as members of the SS as enumerated in the preceding paragraph, who became or remained members of the organization with knowledge that it was being used for the commission of acts declared criminal by Article 6 of the Charter, or who were personally implicated as members of the organization in the commission of such crimes, excluding, however, those who were drafted into membership by the State in such a way as to give them no choice in the matter, and who had committed no such crimes.

In 1949–1950 the United States Displaced Persons Commission investigated the Estonian and Latvian divisions and on 1 September 1950, adopted the following policy:

The Baltic Waffen SS Units are to be considered as separate and distinct in purpose, ideology, activities, and qualifications for membership from the German SS, and therefore the Commission holds them not to be a movement hostile to the Government of the United States under Section 13 of the Displaced Persons Act, as amended.

The Latvian government has asserted that the Latvian Legion, primarily composed of the 15th and 19th Latvian Waffen-SS divisions, was neither a criminal nor collaborationist organization. The ranks of the resistance swelled with the Red Army's attempts to conscript in the Baltic states after the war, and fewer than half the registered conscripts reported in some districts. The widespread harassment of disappearing conscripts' families pushed more people to evade authorities in the forests. Many enlisted men deserted, taking their weapons with them.

== Summer war ==
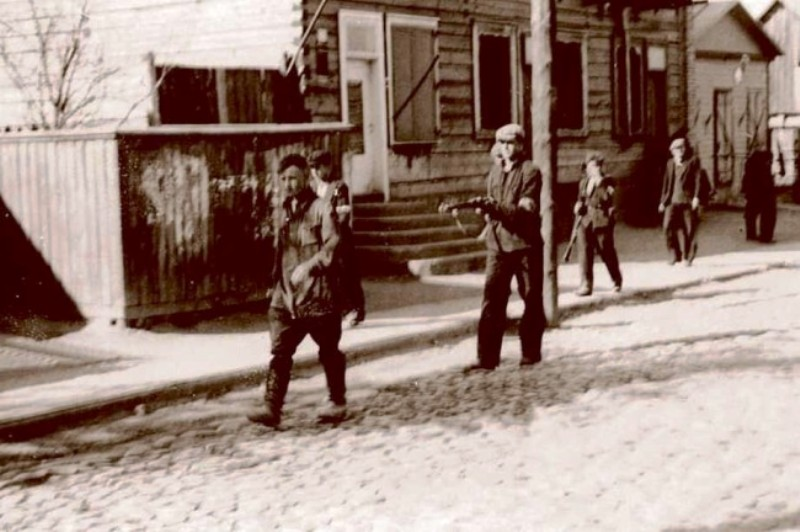
Lithuanian resistance fighters lead the arrested Commissar of the Red Army in Kaunas in 1941

With the German invasion of the Soviet Union on 22 June 1941, Joseph Stalin made a public statement on the radio calling for a scorched earth policy in the areas to be abandoned on 3 July. About 10,000 Forest Brothers, organized into countrywide Omakaitse (Home Guard) organizations, attacked the NKVD, destruction battalions and the 8th Army (Major General Ljubovtsev), killing 4,800 and capturing 14,000. The battle of Tartu lasted for two weeks, and destroyed a large part of the city. Under the leadership of Friedrich Kurg, the Forest Brothers drove the Soviets from Tartu, behind the Rivers Pärnu – Emajõgi line. Thus they secured South Estonia under Estonian control by 10 July. The NKVD murdered 193 people in Tartu Prison on their retreat on 8 July.

The German 18th Army crossed the Estonian southern border on 7–9 July. The Germans resumed their advance in Estonia by working in cooperation with the Forest Brothers and the Omakaitse. In North Estonia, the destruction battalions had the greatest impact, being the last Baltic territory captured from the Soviets. The joint Estonian-German forces took Narva on 17 August, and the Estonian capital Tallinn on 28 August. On that day, the red flag shot down earlier on Pikk Hermann was replaced with the flag of Estonia by Fred Ise only to be replaced yet again by a German Reichskriegsflagge a few hours later. After the Soviets were driven out from Estonia, German Army Group North disarmed all the Forest Brother and Omakaitse groups.

Southern Estonian partisan units were yet again summoned in August 1941 under the name of the Estonian Omakaitse. Members were initially selected from the closest circle of friends. Later, candidate members were asked to sign a declaration that they were not members of a Communist organization. Estonian Omakaitse relied on the former regulations of the Estonian Defence League and Estonian Army, insofar as they were consistent with the laws of German occupation. The tasks of the Omakaitse were as follows:

1. defense of the coast and borders
2. fight against parachutists, sabotage, and espionage
3. guarding militarily important objects
4. fight against Communism
5. assistance to Estonian Police and guaranteeing the general safety of the citizens
6. providing assistance in case of large-scale incidents (fires, floods, diseases, etc.)
7. providing military training for its members and other loyal citizens
8. deepening and preserving the patriotic and national feelings of citizens.

On 15 July, the Omakaitse had 10,200 members; on 1 December 1941, 40,599 members. Until February 1944 membership was around 40,000.

== Guerrilla war ==
By the late 1940s and the early 1950s, the Forest Brothers were provided with supplies, liaison officers and logistical coordination by the British (MI6), American, and Swedish secret intelligence services. That support played a key role in directing the Baltic resistance movement, but it diminished significantly after MI6's Operation Jungle was severely compromised by the activities of British spies (Kim Philby and others) who forwarded information to the Soviets and enabled the MGB to identify, infiltrate and eliminate many Baltic guerrilla units and cut others off from any further contact with Western intelligence operatives.

The conflict between the Soviet armed forces and the Forest Brothers lasted over a decade and cost at least 50,000 lives. Estimates of the number of fighters in each country vary. Misiunas and Taagepera estimate that figures reached 30,000 in Lithuania, between 10,000 and 15,000 in Latvia and 10,000 in Estonia. On the other hand, professor Heinrihs Strods, based on NKVD reports, claims that in 1945, 8,916 partisans were killed in Lithuania, 715 in Latvia and 270 in Estonia, which makes Lithuanian losses around 90%. Even though the real numbers were even larger, many believe this reveals the ratio of the size of resistance among the three countries.

=== In Estonia ===
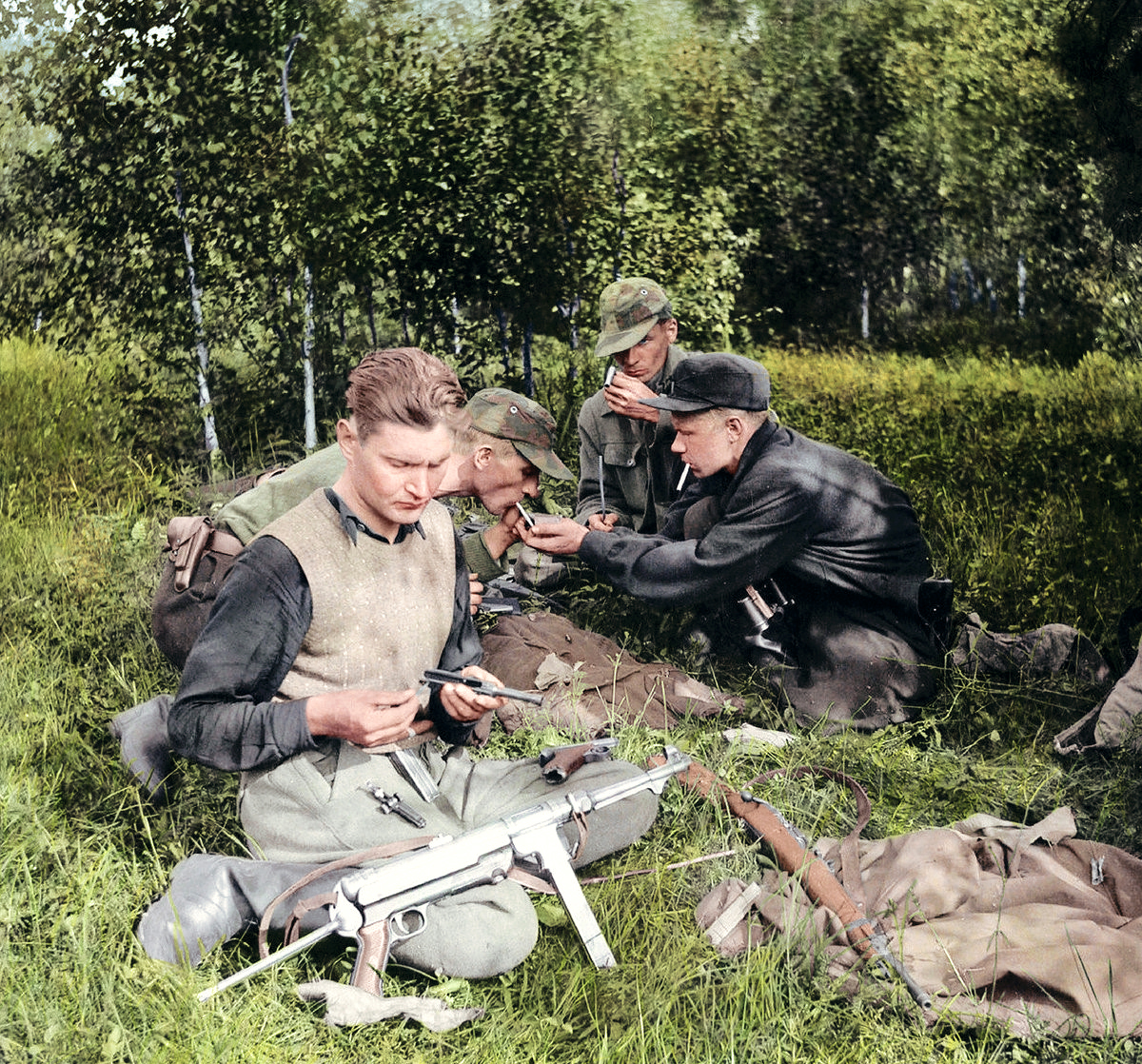
Estonian fighters, Järva county in 1953, relaxing after a shooting exercise (colorized photo)

In Estonia 14,000–15,000 men participated in the fighting between 1944 and 1953 – the Forest Brothers were most active in Võru County along the borderlands between Pärnu and Lääne counties and included significant activity between Tartu and Viru counties as well. From November 1944 to November 1947, they carried out 773 armed attacks, killing about 1,000 Soviets and their supporters. At its peak in 1947, the organization controlled dozens of villages and towns, creating considerable nuisance to Soviet supply transports that required an armed escort. August Sabbe, one of the last surviving Forest Brothers, was discovered in 1978 by KGB agents posing as fishermen. Instead of surrendering he leaped into the Võhandu but was pinned under a log, either by mistake or on purpose, and drowned. The KGB insisted that the 69-year-old Sabbe had drowned while trying to escape, a theory difficult to credit given the shallow water and lack of cover at the site. Another noted member of Forest Brothers, Kalev Arro, evaded capture by disguising himself as a vagrant while hiding in the forests of southern Estonia for 20 years. He was killed in a shooting encounter with KGB agents in 1974.

There were numerous attempts to hunt down relatives of the Forest Brothers. An Estonian who managed to escape deportation was Taimi Kreitsberg. She recalled that Soviet officials "...took me to Võru, I was not beaten there, but for three days and nights I was given neither food nor drink. They told me they were not going to kill me, but torture me [until] I betrayed all the bandits. For about a month they dragged me through woods and took me to farms owned by relatives of Forest Brothers, and they sent me in as an instigator to ask for food and shelter while the Chekists themselves waited outside. I told people to drive me away, as I had been sent by the security organs."

=== In Latvia ===
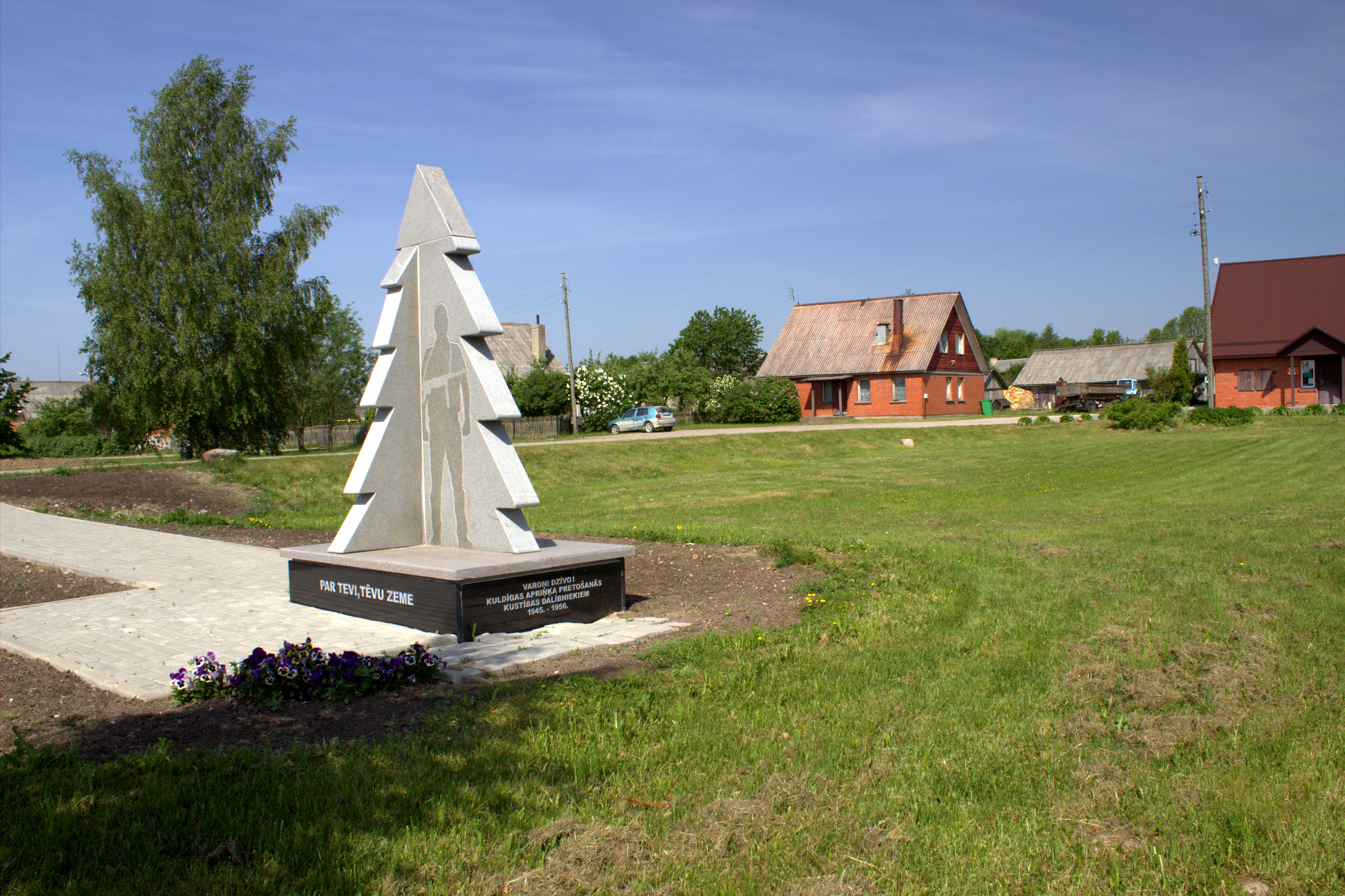
Memorial site of National Partisans in Ķikuri, Turlava Parish, Kuldīga Municipality

In Latvia, preparations for partisan operations began during the German occupation, but the leaders of these nationalist units were arrested by Nazi authorities. Longer-lived resistance units began to form at the end of the war, composed of former Latvian Legion soldiers and civilians. On 8 September 1944 in Riga, the leadership of the Latvian Central Council adopted the Declaration on the Restoration of the State of Latvia. It was intended to restore de facto independence to the Latvian republic. In addition it was hoped international supporters would take advantage of the interval between changeovers of the occupying powers. The Declaration prescribed that the Satversme, the Constitution of Latvia, was the fundamental law of the restored Republic of Latvia, and provided for the re-establishment of a Cabinet of Ministers that would organise the restoration of the independence of Latvia.

Some of the most prominent LCC accomplishments were related to its military branch – the General Jānis Kurelis Group (the so-called kurelieši) with the Lieutenant Roberts Rubenis Battalion, which carried out armed resistance against Waffen SS forces and was envisioned as a new pro-Latvian independence army, but was decimated by the SS and SD in November 1944, with many servicemen executed or sent to the Stutthof concentration camp. The survivors joined various resistance groups.

The number of active combatants peaked between 10,000 and 15,000, while the total number of resistance fighters was as high as 40,000. One author gives a figure of up to 12,000 grouped in 700 bands during the 1945–1955 decade, but definitive figures are unavailable. Over time, the partisans replaced their German weapons with Soviet makes. The Central Command of Latvian resistance organizations maintained an office on Matīsa Street in Riga until 1947. In some 3,000 raids, the partisans inflicted damage on uniformed military personnel, party cadres (particularly in rural areas), buildings, and ammunition depots. The communist authorities reported 1,562 Soviet personnel killed and 560 wounded during the entire resistance period.

One account of a typical Forest Brothers action is provided by Tālrīts Krastiņš. He, a reconnaissance soldier of the 19th Waffen Grenadier Division of the SS (2nd Latvian), was recruited with 15 other Latvians into a Nazi German stay-behind unit at the close of the war. Escaping to the forest, the group, led by Krastiņš, avoided all contact with local residents and relatives, robbing trucks for money while simultaneously maintaining an apartment in the center of Riga for reconnaissance operations. At first they assassinated low-level Communist party managers, but later focused their efforts on attempting to assassinate the head of the Latvian SSR, Vilis Lācis. The group recruited a Russian woman working at the Supreme Soviet of the Latvian SSR who told them Lācis' transportation schedule. They set up a roadside ambush when Lācis was traveling from Riga to Jūrmala, but shot up the wrong car. The second attempt likewise relied on a female collaborator, who proved to be an undercover NKVD agent. The entire group was apprehended and sentenced to prison in 1948.

The Latvian Forest Brothers were particularly active in the border regions, including Dundaga, Taurkalne, Lubāna, Aloja, and Līvāni. In the eastern regions, they had ties with the Estonian Forest Brothers; and in the western regions, with the Lithuanians. As in Estonia and Lithuania, the partisans were killed and infiltrated by the MVD and NKVD over many years. As in Estonia and Lithuania, assistance from Western intelligence was severely compromised by Soviet counter-intelligence and Latvian double agents such as Augusts Bergmanis and Vidvuds Šveics. Furthermore, the Soviets gradually consolidated their rule in the cities – help from rural civilians was less forthcoming with many of them deported during the 1949 deportations or forced to work in kolkhozes, and special military and security units were sent to control the partisans. The last groups emerged from the forest in 1957 to surrender to the authorities.

=== In Lithuania ===
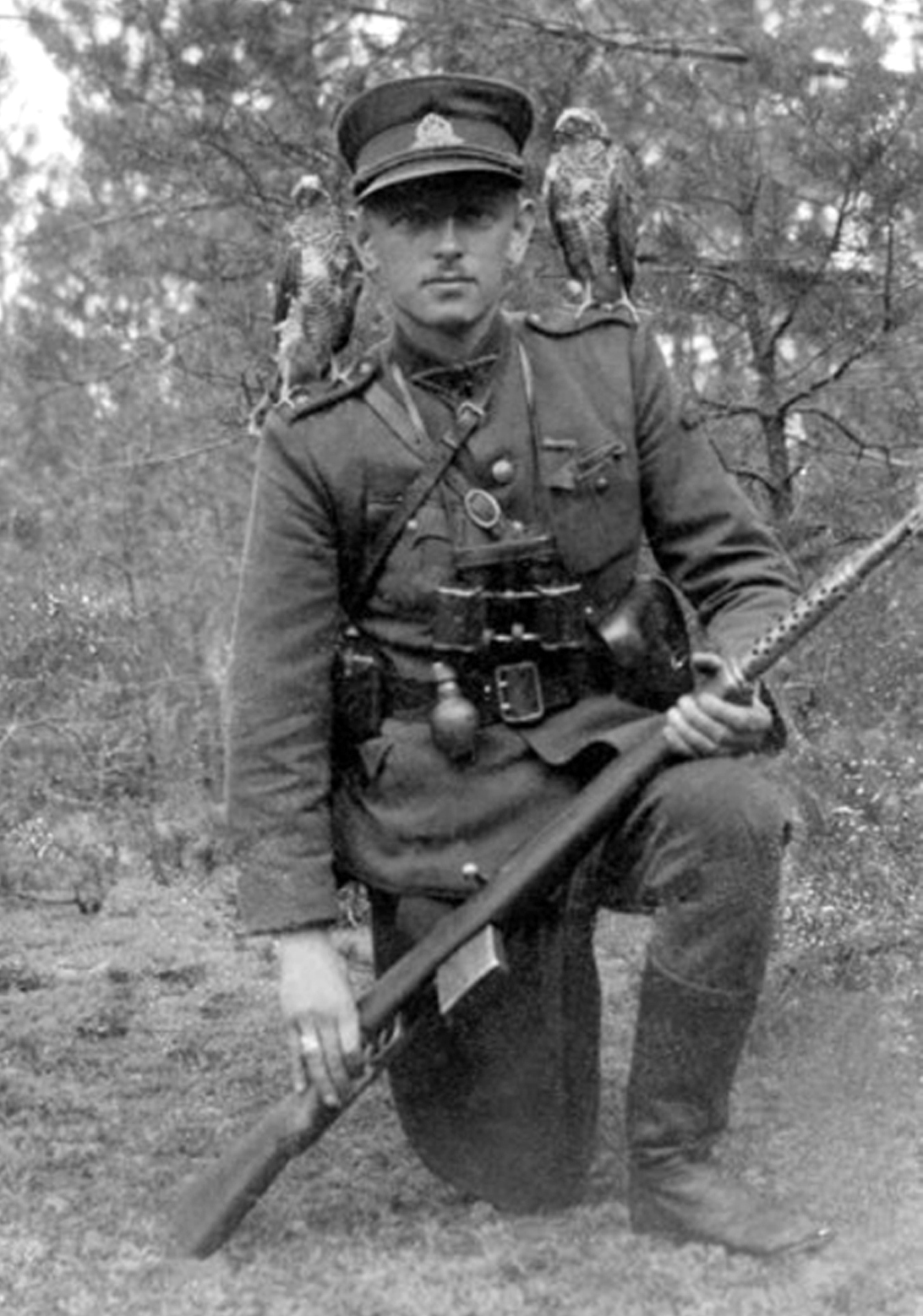
Adolfas Ramanauskas ("The Hawk"), commander of the Union of Lithuanian Freedom Fighters

Among the three countries, the resistance was best organized in Lithuania, where guerrilla units controlled whole regions of the countryside until 1949. Their armaments included Czech Škoda guns, Russian Maxim heavy machine guns, assorted mortars, and a wide variety of mainly German and Soviet light machine guns and submachine guns. When not in direct battles with the Red Army or special NKVD units, they significantly delayed the consolidation of Soviet rule through ambush, sabotage, assassination of local Communist activists and officials, freeing imprisoned guerrillas and printing underground newspapers.

On 1 July 1944, Lithuanian Liberty Army (LLA) declared the state of war against the Soviet occupation and ordered all its able members to mobilize into platoons, station in forests and not to leave Lithuania. The departments were replaced by two sectors – operational, called Vanagai (Hawks or Falcons; abbreviated VS), and organizational (abbreviated OS). Vanagai, commanded by Albinas Karalius (codename Varenis), were the armed fighters while the organizational sector was tasked with passive resistance, including supply of food, information, and transport to Vanagai. In the middle of 1944, the LLA had 10,000 members. The Soviets killed 659 and arrested 753 members of the LLA by 26 January 1945. Founder Kazys Veverskis was killed in December 1944, and the headquarters was liquidated in December 1945. This represented a failure of highly centralized resistance, as the organization was too dependent on Veverskis and other top commanders. In 1946 remaining leaders and fighters of LLA started to merge with Lithuanian partisans. In 1949 all members of presidium of Union of Lithuanian Freedom Fighters – captain Jonas Žemaitis-Tylius, Petras Bartkus-Žadgaila, Bronius Liesys-Naktis ir Juozas Šibaila-Merainis came from LLA.

Supreme Committee for the Liberation of Lithuania (Lithuanian: Vyriausiasis Lietuvos išlaisvinimo komitetas, VLIK), was created on 25 November 1943. VLIK published underground newspapers and agitated for resistance against Nazis. The Gestapo arrested the most influential members in 1944. After the reoccupation of Lithuania by the Soviets, VLIK moved to the West and set its goal as maintaining non-recognition of Lithuania's occupation and disseminating information from behind the iron curtain – including information provided by the Lithuanian partisans.

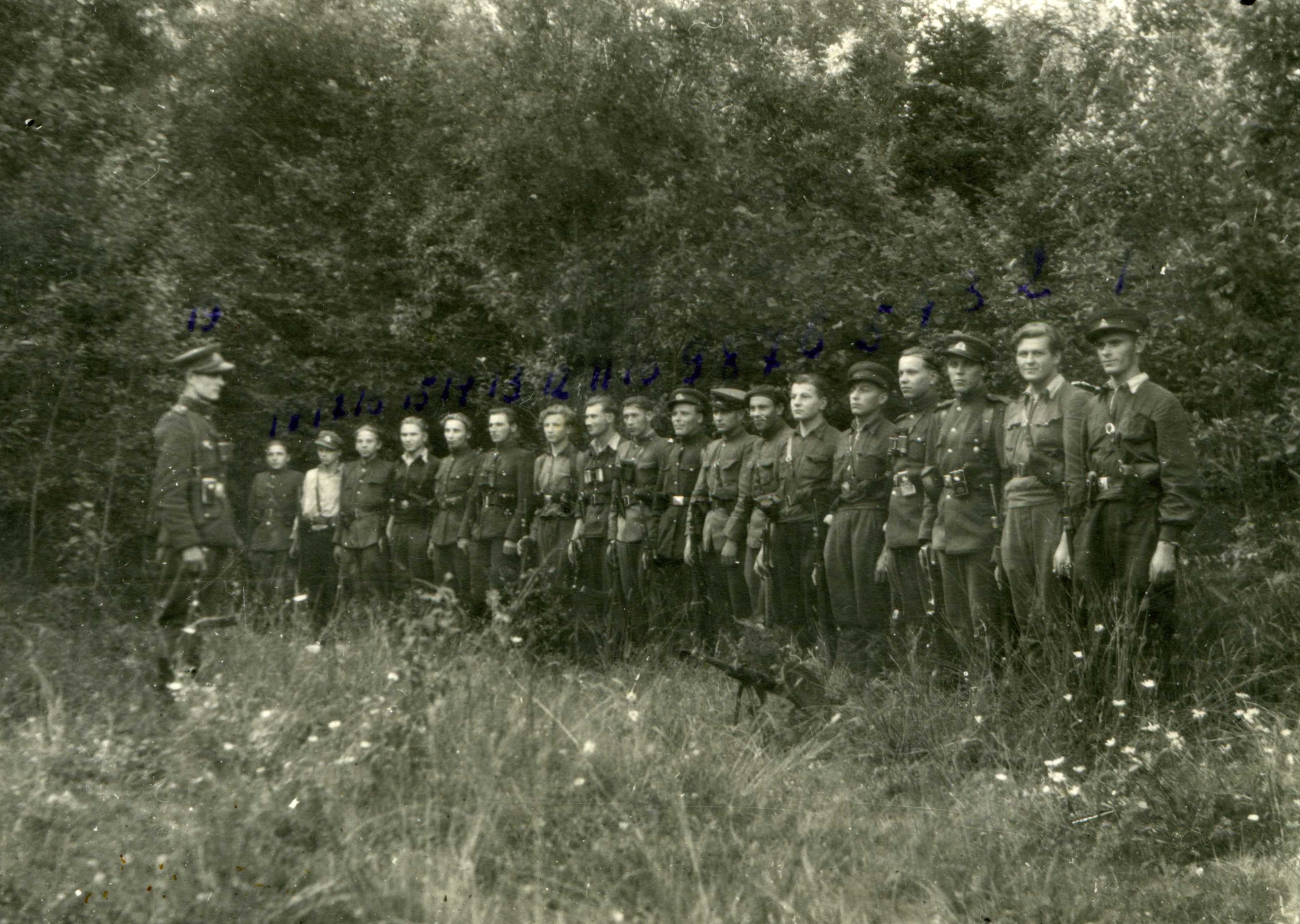
Lithuanian partisans from the Dainava military district

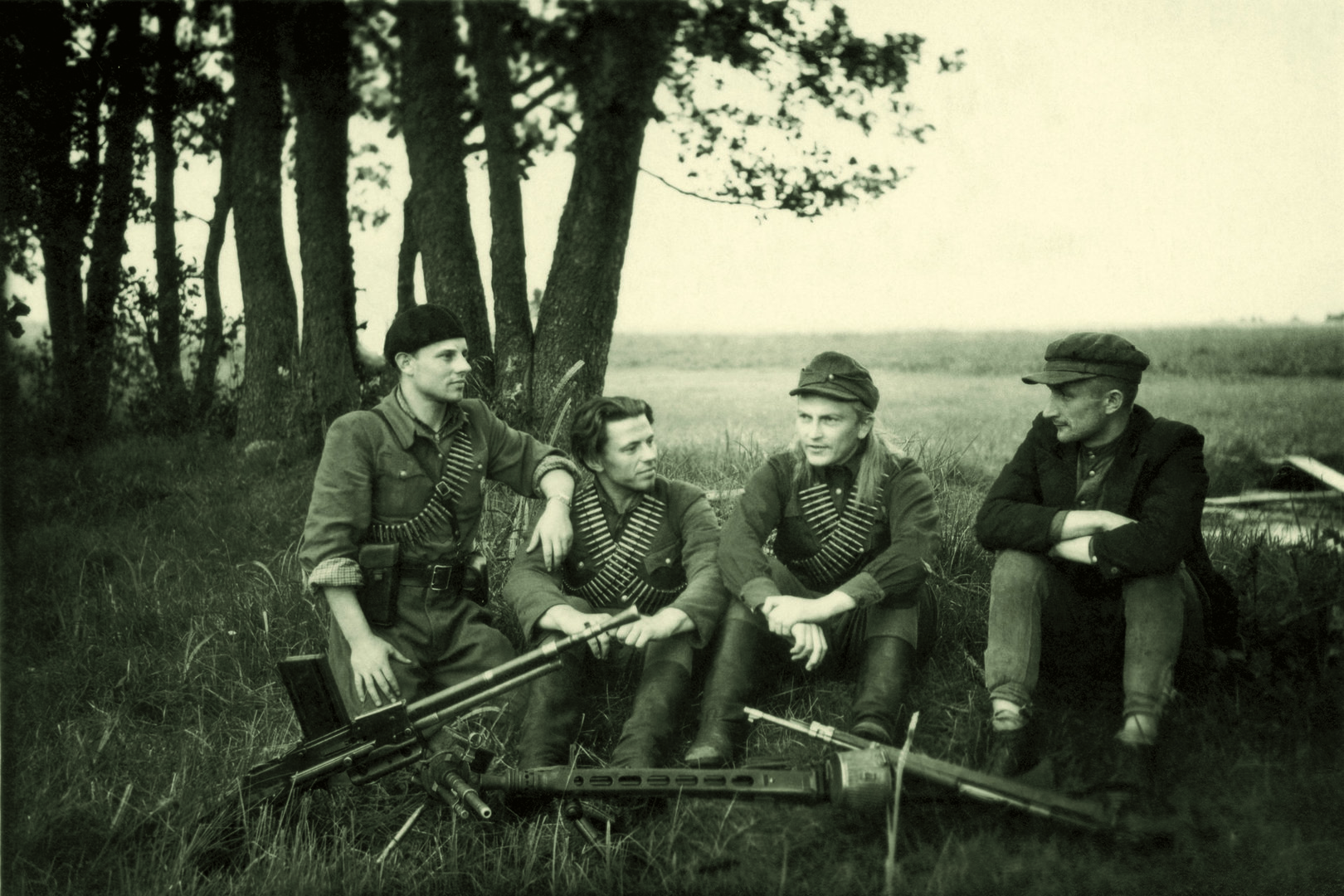
Small group of partisans from the Vytis military district in 1946.

Former members of the Lithuanian Territorial Defense Force, Lithuanian Liberty Army, Lithuanian Armed Forces, Lithuanian Riflemen's Union formed the basis of Lithuanian partisans. Farmers, Lithuanian officials, students, teachers, and even pupils joined the partisan movement. The movement was actively supported by society and the Catholic Church. By the end of 1945, an estimated 30,000 armed people lived in the forests in Lithuania.

The partisans were well-armed. From 1945 to 1951, Soviet repressive structures seized from partisans 31 mortars, 2,921 machine guns, 6,304 assault rifles, 22,962 rifles, 8,155 pistols, 15,264 grenades, 2,596 mines, and 3,779,133 cartridges. The partisans replenished their arsenal by killing istrebiteli, members of Soviet secret-police forces or by purchasing ammunition from Red Army soldiers. Every partisan had binoculars and a few grenades, usually saving one to blow themselves up to avoid being taken as prisoner, since the physical tortures of Soviet MGB/NKVD were very brutal and cruel, and to prevent their relatives from suffering.

In May 1948, to combat the guerrillas, the Soviets carried out the largest deportation from Lithuania, Operation Spring, when some 40 to 50 thousand people associated with "forest brothers" were deported to Siberia.

Captured Lithuanian Forest Brothers often faced torture and summary execution while their relatives faced deportation to Siberia (cf. quotation). Reprisals against anti-Soviet farms and villages were harsh. NKVD units named People's Defense Platoons (known by the Lithuanians as pl. stribai, from Russian: izstrebiteli – destroyers, i.e., the destruction battalions), used shock tactics such as displaying executed partisans' corpses in village courtyards to discourage further resistance.

The report of a commission formed at a KGB prison a few days after the 15 October 1956, arrest of Adolfas Ramanauskas ("Vanagas"), chief commander of the Union of Lithuanian Freedom Fighters, noted the following:

The right eye is covered with haematoma, on the eyelid there are six stab wounds made, judging by their diameter, by a thin wire or nail going deep into the eyeball. Multiple haematomas in the area of the stomach, a cut wound on a finger of the right hand. The genitalia reveal the following: a large tear wound on the right side of the scrotum and a wound on the left side, both testicles and spermatic ducts are missing.

Juozas Lukša was among those who managed to escape to the West; he wrote his memoirs in Paris – Fighters for Freedom. Lithuanian Partisans Versus the U.S.S.R.. Lukša was killed after returning to Lithuania in 1951.

Pranas Končius (code name Adomas) was one of the last few Lithuanian anti-Soviet resistance fighters, killed in action by Soviet forces on 6 July 1965 (some sources indicate he shot himself in order to avoid capture on 13 July). He was awarded the Cross of Vytis posthumously in 2000.

Benediktas Mikulis, one of the last known partisans to remain in the forest, emerged in 1971. He was arrested in the 1980s and spent several years in prison.

=== Decline of the resistance movements ===
By the early 1950s, the Soviet forces had eradicated most of the Forest Brother resistance. Intelligence gathered by the Soviet spies in the West and MGB infiltrators within the resistance movement, in combination with large-scale Soviet operations in 1952, managed to end the campaigns against them.

Many of the remaining Forest Brothers laid down their weapons when offered an amnesty by the Soviet authorities after Stalin's death in 1953, although isolated engagements continued into the 1960s. The last individual guerrillas are known to have remained in hiding and evaded capture into the 1980s, by which time the Baltic states were pressing for independence through peaceful means. (See Sąjūdis, Baltic Way, Singing Revolution)

== Aftermath and legacy ==
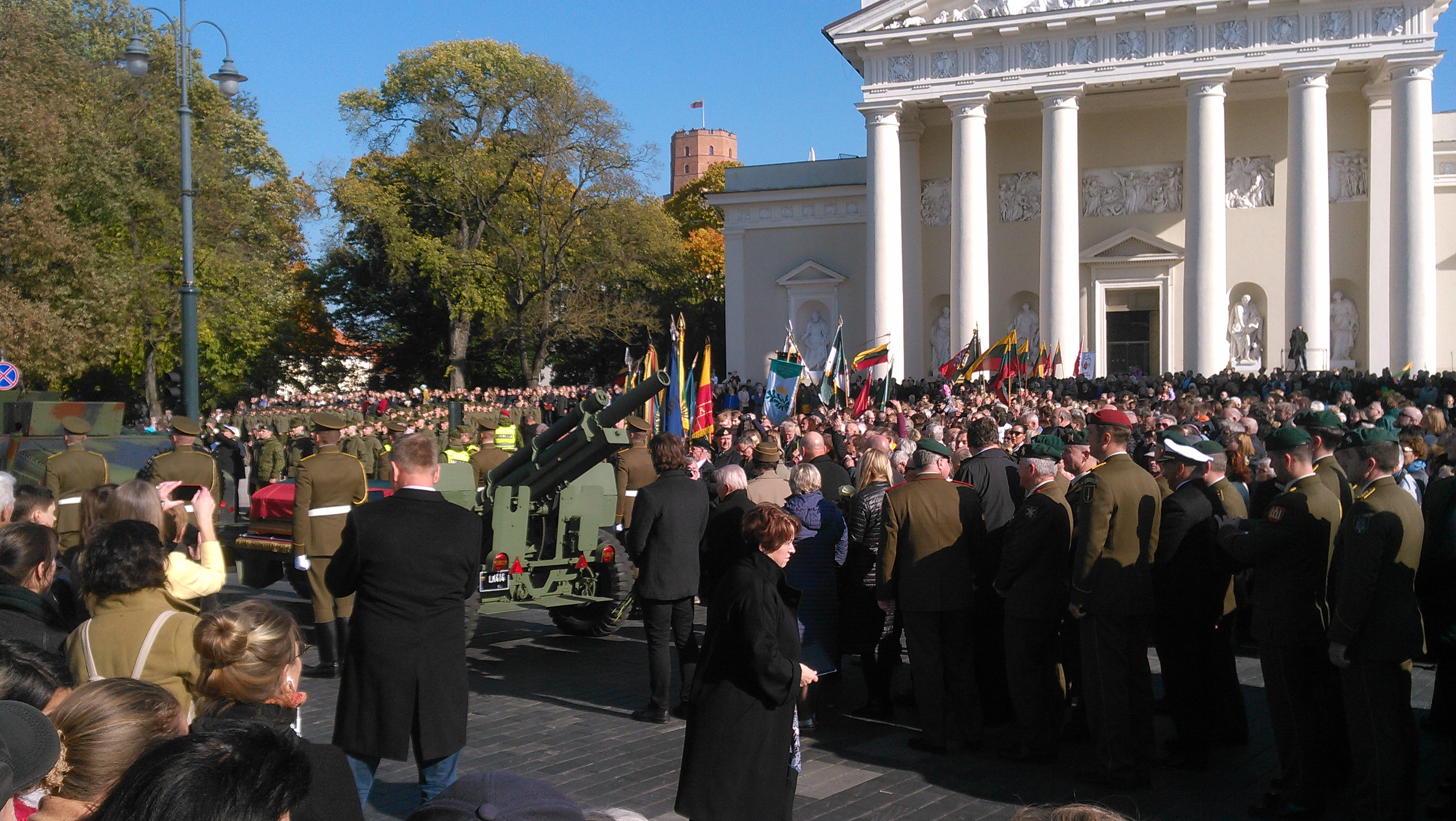
State funeral of the Lithuanian partisan commander Adolfas Ramanauskas-Vanagas (1918–1957), 2018

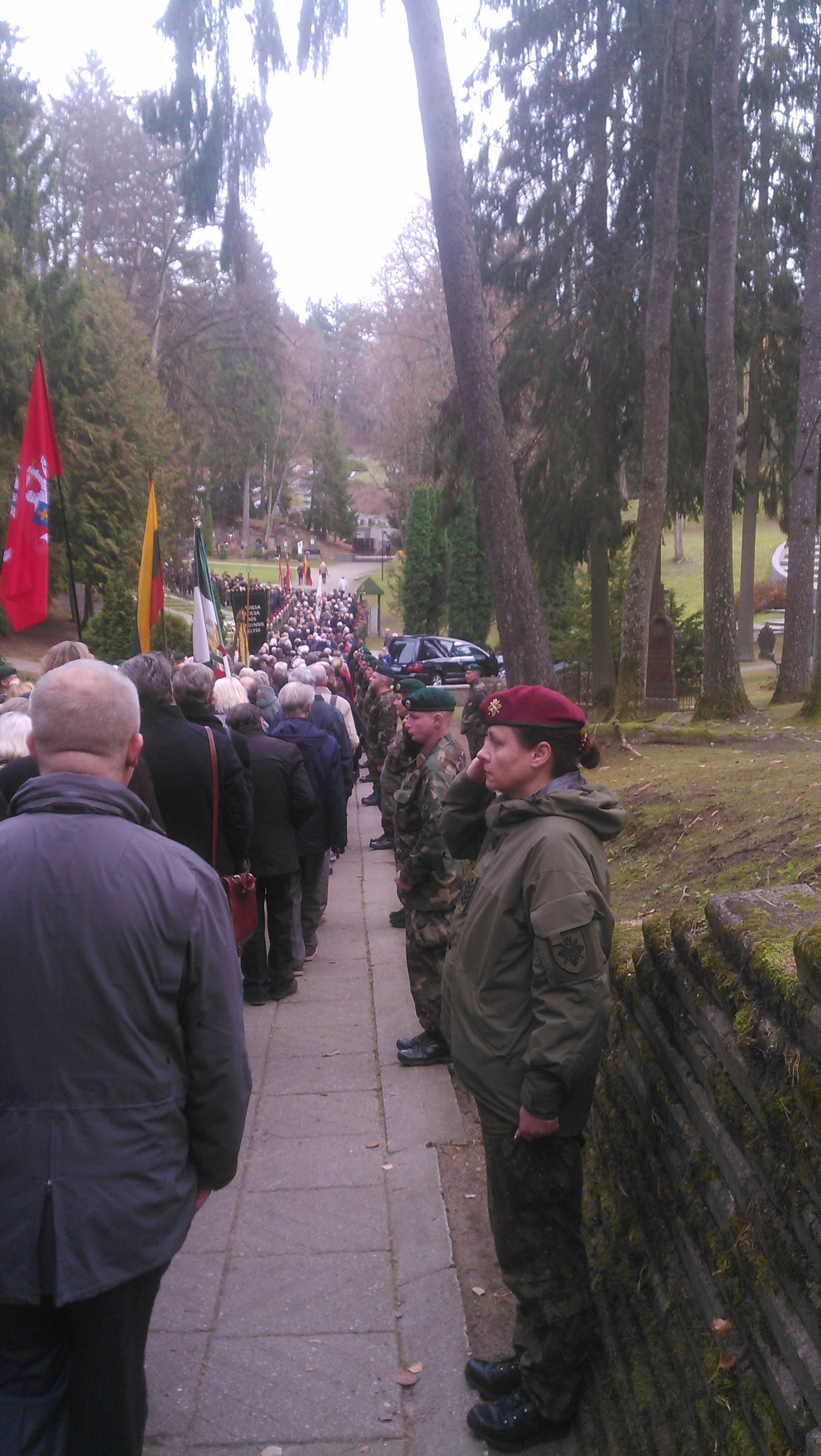
State funeral of the last Lithuanian anti-Soviet partisan A. Kraujelis-Siaubūnas (1928–1965), 2019

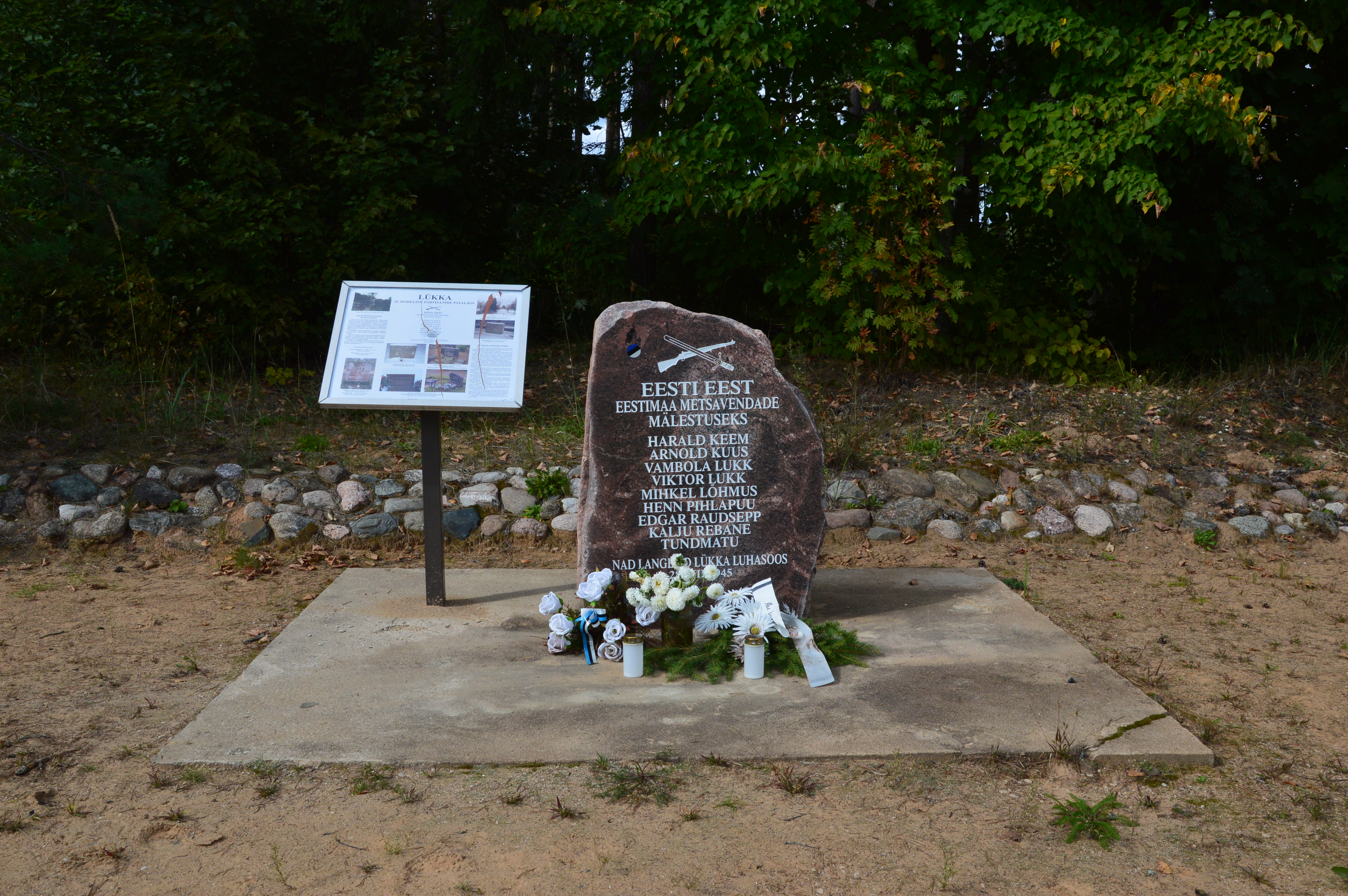
Memorial stone in Rõuge Parish to Forest Brothers who died in Lükka battle

The terror from 1944 to 1953 was widespread, and no one, not even members of the higher party authorities or security apparatus officials, could be certain of the future. The all-pervasive, overwhelming fear was intended to suppress any resistance. During this period, 183,000 residents of Lithuania were arrested, of whom 142,000 were sent to the Gulags and 80,000 convicts received sentences for political crimes. In Latvia, 88,000 people were sent to prisons and labor camps, and at least 2,321 were executed. In Estonia, no fewer than 34,800 people were arrested for political reasons, and 900 more were executed.

Many Forest Brothers persisted in the hope that Cold War hostilities between the West, which never formally recognized the Soviet occupation, and the Soviet Union might escalate to an armed conflict in which the Baltic states would be liberated. This never materialized, and according to Mart Laar many of the surviving former Forest Brothers remained bitter that the West did not take on the Soviet Union militarily. (See also Yalta Conference). When the brutal suppression of the Hungarian Revolution in 1956 did not bring about an intervention by, or a supportive response from, Western powers, organized resistance in the Baltic States declined further.

As the conflict was relatively undocumented by the Soviet Union (the Baltic fighters were formally charged as common criminals), some consider it and the Soviet-Baltic conflict as a whole to be an unknown or forgotten war. Discussion of resistance was suppressed under the Soviet regime. Writings on the subject by Baltic emigrants were often labelled as examples of "ethnic sympathy" and disregarded. Laar's research efforts, begun in Estonia in the late 1980s, are considered to have opened the door for further study.

In 1999, the Lithuanian Seimas (parliament) enacted a declaration of independence that had been made on 16 February 1949, the 31st anniversary of the 16 February 1918 declaration of independence, by elements of the resistance unified under the "Movement of the Struggle for the Freedom of Lithuania".

... a universal, organised, armed resistance namely, self-defence, by the Lithuanian State, did take place in Lithuania during 1944–1953, against the soviet occupation ... the goal ... was the liberation of Lithuania, relying upon the provisions of the Atlantic Charter and a sovereign right acknowledged by the democratic world, by bearing arms against one of the World War II Aggressors ... The Council of the Movement of the Struggle for Freedom of Lithuania ... constituted the supreme political and military structure ... and was the sole legal authority within the territory of occupied Lithuania.

In Latvia and Lithuania, Forest Brothers veterans receive a small pension. In Lithuania, the third Sunday in May is commemorated as Partisans' Day. In 2005 there were about 350 surviving Forest Brothers in Lithuania. By 2024, Ruuben Lambur (1925–2024) was the last Estonian Forest Brother still healthy enough to make public appearances.

In a 2001 lecture in Tallinn, US Senator John McCain acknowledged the Estonian Forest Brothers and their efforts.

=== Forest Brothers in popular culture ===
The Canadian film Legendi loojad (Creators of the Legend) about the Estonian Forest Brothers was released in 1963. The film was funded by donations from Estonians in exile.

The 1966 Soviet drama film Nobody Wanted to Die (Lithuanian: Niekas nenorėjo mirti) by Soviet-Lithuanian film director Vytautas Žalakevičius shows the tragedy of the conflict in which "a brother goes against the brother." The film garnered Žalakevičius the USSR State Prize and international recognition, and is the best-known film portrayal of the conflict.

The popular Soviet Latvian TV drama series Long Road in the Dunes (1980–1982) touches the topic of Latvian Forest Brothers from a Soviet perspective.

A 1997 documentary film We Lived for Estonia tells the story of the Estonian Forest Brothers from the viewpoint of one of the participants.

Another popular Latvian TV series, Rulers of Destiny (Latvian: Likteņa līdumnieki), produced by Latvijas Televīzija from 2003 to 2008, shows the impact of the struggle (and other historical events from 1885 to 1995) on the life of the Nārbuļi family and their homestead.

The 2004 film Utterly Alone (Lithuanian: Vienui Vieni) portrays the travails of Lithuanian partisan leader Juozas Lukša, who travelled twice to Western Europe in attempts to gain support for the armed resistance.

The 2005 documentary film Stirna tells the story of Izabelė Vilimaitė (codenames Stirna and Sparnuota), an American-born Lithuanian who moved to Lithuania with her family in 1932. A medical student and pharmacist, she was an underground medic and source of medical supplies for the partisans, eventually becoming a district liaison. She infiltrated the local Komsomol (Communist Youth), was discovered, captured, and escaped twice. After going underground full-time, she was suspected of having been turned by the KGB as an informant and was nearly executed by the partisans. The KGB eventually discovered her bunker and she was captured a third time, interrogated and killed.

The 2007 Estonian film Sons of One Forest (Estonian: Ühe metsa pojad) follows the story of two Forest Brothers in southern Estonia, who fight with an Estonian from the Waffen-SS against the Soviet occupants.

The 2013 novel Forest Brothers by Geraint Roberts, follows the fortune of a disgraced British Navy officer who returns to Estonia in 1944 for British Intelligence. Many people from his past who aid him have taken to the forest, during the ongoing conflict between Germany and the Soviet Union.

Recent examples in Latvian cinematography include the 2014 film Alias Loner (Latvian: Segvārds Vientulis), depicting the story of high-ranking resistance fighter and Catholic priest Antons Juhņevičs and the 2019 TV series Red Forest (Latvian: Sarkanais mežs) about Latvian agents sent by MI6 into Soviet-occupied Latvia to find support among local partisans under Operation Jungle.

=== The last Forest Brother ===
The last known Forest Brother was Jānis Pīnups, who did not come out of hiding until 1995. He had deserted from the Red Army in 1944 and he was presumed missing in action by Soviet authorities in Latvia. He was rendered unconscious and left for dead during a battle. He decided to return to his home, where he hid in the nearby forest out of fear that his family would be deported if his desertion was discovered. About 25 years after he went into hiding, he was forced to seek medical assistance and he started to act more freely thereafter. Still, only his siblings and, later on, his nearest neighbors were aware of who he was, even the rest of his family did not learn that he had not been killed in the war until he came out of hiding.

== See also ==
- Anti-Soviet partisans
- Battle of Määritsa
- Occupation of the Baltic states
