= Site of the Jewish Massacre and Grave in Salantai =

Mass grave and Holocaust memorial site in Lithuania

Site of the Jewish Massacre and Grave in Salantai (state-protected cultural heritage object of national significance: unique code – 10980, old registry code – I51, old cultural monument number – IV382) – a grave of Holocaust victims in the northeastern part of Kretinga District Municipality, in Šalynas (Kūlupėnai Eldership), 7 km southwest of Salantai, Lithuania, on the left bank of the Kūlupis River.

== Location ==
The western edge of an abandoned gravel quarry. The surface is uneven, sloping westward toward the Kūlupis stream. In the eastern part, a large boulder measuring 3.16 m long in an east-west direction, 2.0 m wide, and 1.54 m high juts out from a hollow. On its eastern side is a black polished stone memorial plaque, which features a Star of David and inscriptions in Yiddish and Lithuanian:

דאָ אין יאָר 1941

דערהארגעט 18 ײדן

At this location in 1941

18 Jews were killed

10 meters to the west-southwest of the stone is a 2.4 x 4.2 m elongated mound, oriented north-south, marking the grave, surrounded by a metal openwork railing.

To the northeast of the stone is a triangular cross-section black polished stone typical of Holocaust victim graves, with a slanted cut apex where a Star of David is carved, and on the front face, an inscription in Lithuanian and English: "Holocaust victim graves / Holocaust mass graves / 30 M."

The area of the site is 0.04 ha.

5 km to the northeast are the Salantai Holocaust Victims Graves and the Old Jewish Cemetery in Salantai. 8.9 km to the east is the grave site of Jewish women and children from Salantai.

== History ==
On June 22, 1941, after the Nazi Germany army occupied the town of Salantai, the secret state police, assisted by SS officers and auxiliary police, arrested all Jewish residents living in the town and surrounding areas during the early days of the war, confining them in a ghetto established in the area of the synagogue. At the beginning of July, 11 Jewish men and about 140 women were sent for field work to Šalynas Manor. After a few days, the women and girls were distributed for work to farmers in nearby villages, while the men were left to work at the manor.

In the first half of July, the security police began the massacres of the Jews from Salantai, which also affected those Jews who had been taken to Šalynas. The number of victims killed here varies greatly according to different researchers. The Atlas of the Holocaust in Lithuania states that 18 victims were killed in Šalynas. Researcher Paulius Vaniuchinas, who studies the history of the Jewish community in Salantai, collected data indicating that 45–50 Holocaust victims were buried in Šalynas.

As the extermination of Jews began, in mid-July, auxiliary policemen from Salantai arrived at Šalynas, where they arrested all 11 Jewish men working at the manor and took them to a nearby gravel quarry, where they were shot. Jewish women who were working for farmers were returned to the manor by order of the security police at the end of August, from where about 100 women were taken to Salantai and later shot in the Šateikiai Rūdaičiai forest. About 40 girls remained at the manor, one of whom, Basia Abelmanaite, managed to escape and find refuge with farmers Sofia and Pranas Kasperaitis until the end of the war. Another 30–35 girls were shot on September 12 in the same quarry, alongside the men. Four young women were left to milk the cows at the manor, but they were soon shot near the Eglinskai homestead by two auxiliary policemen who had come from Salantai.

The site of the massacres was declared a local historical monument in 1970 (IV382), registered in the list of historical sites in the Cultural Heritage Register in 1997 (I51), and recognized as a state-protected cultural heritage object in 2005.
