= Jānis Pīnups =

Latvian freedom fighter, last of the Forest Brothers

Jānis Pīnups (Latgalian: Juoņs Pynups; 10 May 1925 – 15 June 2007) was the last of the Forest Brothers to come out of hiding, in 1995, at the age of 70.

== Biography ==
He had been conscripted into the Red Army in August 1944 and was sent to the front, where he participated in two battles. A concussion rendered him unconscious in the second battle. When he awoke, he saw that no one was left on the battlefield and seized the opportunity to desert, finally managing to return home on 7 October 1944.

God has protected me from all, helping me escape from my persecutors when I fled from the army. I knew what happened to escapees. I saw two "deserters" shot before my eyes. I didn't flee through thickets or field but stuck to the road instead. God bless the farmers in Koknese who gave me civilian clothes when I arrived there from Madliena.

From that moment, he spent more than 50 years hiding from the authorities and strangers. Only his brothers and sister knew he was even alive. At first, he lived in the forest, but with cold weather setting in, he fitted out a hidden underground bunker for himself on the farm of some relatives. In the 1950s, these relatives built a new house, leaving their old one derelict, that becoming another sanctuary for hiding from strangers.

He came out into the yard during the day only when his neighbors couldn't see him. He also helped his brothers with farm work, as well as picking mushrooms and berries in the forest—all of which he did only by the cover of night, having constructed a number of bunkers in the forest to help him stay hidden.

All that warfare seemed senseless to me, like the fact our troops were being driven directly upon the German tanks. [Red Army officers had standing orders to shoot anyone who retreated.] Luckily, I didn't have to shoot once in this war. I couldn't kill someone—I can't even slaughter a chicken. Similarly, when I was hiding in the woods and I was almost found out, I nevertheless managed to save myself. That is because I prayed daily, and I now attend church every Sunday.

Once he accidentally wandered into the parish center and met a man at the bus stop who said that he knew Pīnups, but couldn't remember his name. Pīnups fled immediately— the incident made him even more cautious because, after a quarter of a century, he had been convinced no one would remember him. As late as the 1980s, when Pīnups dislocated his ankle, he sought medical assistance under an assumed name.

He spent his last two decades in hiding being particularly cautious. Remaining in hiding became increasingly difficult after his brothers died and only his sister Veronika was left alive. Nor was he able to continue to assist or stay with her after her curious neighbors inquired as to who it was that was visiting her.

== Independence ==
In 1991, when Latvia had regained its independence, Pīnups nevertheless remained in hiding because of the former Soviet forces which still remained in Latvia. Only after six months when last occupation troops left Latvian territory Pīnups could finally raze his forest bunkers and, at the age of 70, appear at the Pelēči parish police station to announce that he had been hiding from the government in the surrounding woods for the last 50 years.

He was officially granted his Latvian citizenship and moved in to live with his sister, who had no other family. Initially he was only awarded social welfare (approximately 25 lats per month) as the Ministry of Welfare considered him ineligible for a pension, however, this was later changed to recognize his service to the Latvian nation. Pīnups died in 2007 at the age of 82.
