= Forgotten war =

"The Forgotten War" (capitalized) most often refers to:

- Forgotten War (book), a 2013 book about the Australian frontier wars
- Korean War (in the United States and the United Kingdom)
- Ifni War (in Spain)

The term forgotten war is also sometimes, though much less commonly and less specifically, used to refer to:

- Southern theater of the American Revolutionary War
- Philippine–American War
- War of 1812 (outside of the United States)
- First Barbary War and Second Barbary War
- Campaigns in Finland during World War II (outside of Finland); see Military history of Finland during World War II
- Forest Brothers resistance in the Soviet-occupied Baltic states
- Laotian Civil War (outside of Laos)
- The Burma Campaign of World War II (outside of Burma)
- Spanish Civil War (outside of Spain)
- Soviet–Afghan War
- First Chechen War and Second Chechen War (outside of Chechnya)
- War in Afghanistan (2001–2021) (outside of Afghanistan)
- War in Donbas (2014–2022) (outside of Ukraine)
