= The Holocaust in Estonia =

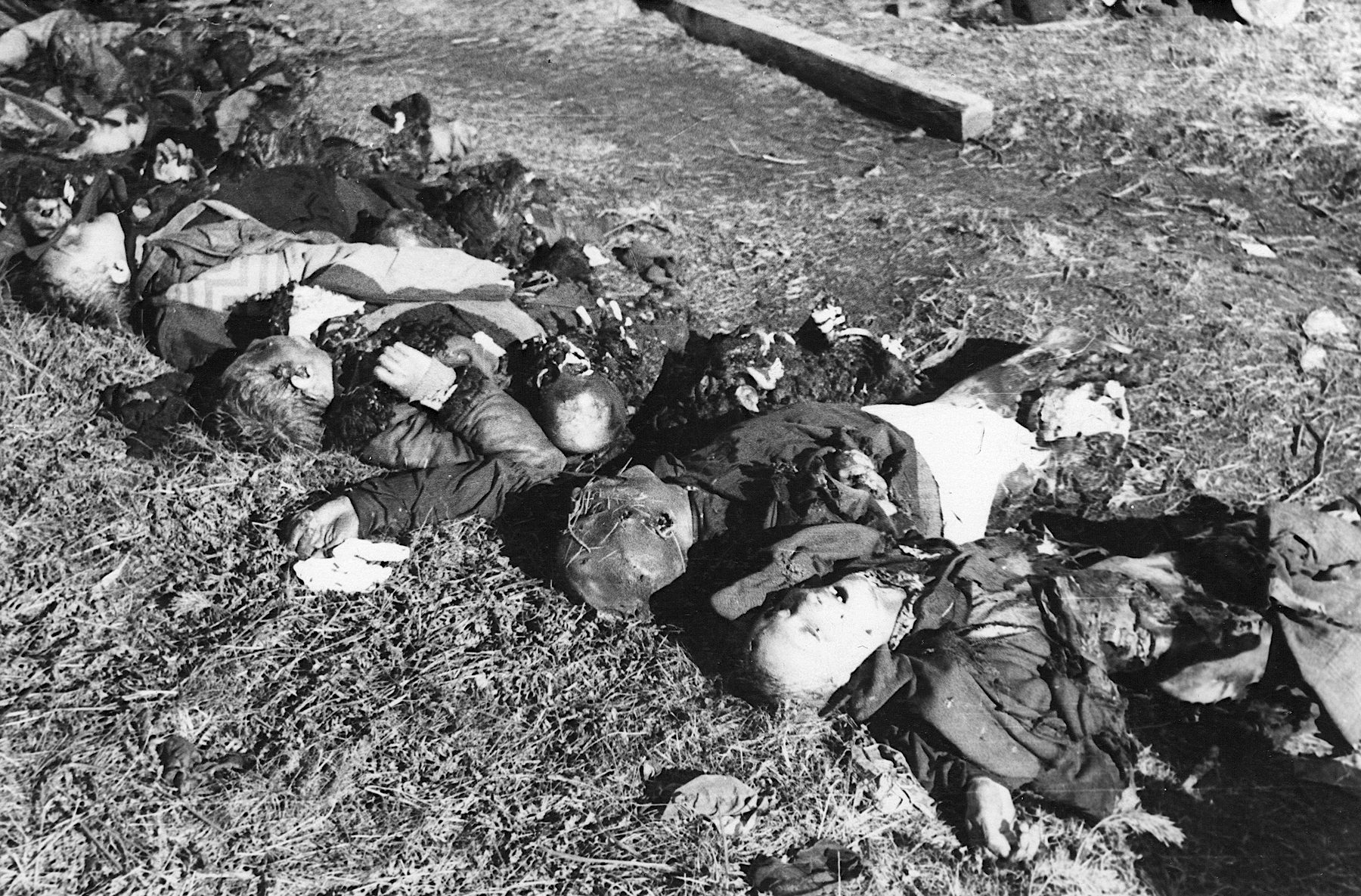
Corpses found by the Soviet authorities at the Klooga concentration camp after the German forces' departure (late 1944)

By late January 1942, virtually all of the 950 to 1,000 Estonian Jews unable to escape Estonia before its occupation by Nazi Germany (25% of the total prewar Jewish population) were killed in the Holocaust by German units such as Einsatzgruppe A and/or local collaborators. The Romani people in Estonia were also killed or enslaved by Nazi occupiers and their collaborators.

The occupation authorities also killed around 6,000 ethnic Estonians and 1,000 ethnic Russians in Estonia, often claiming that they were Communists or Communist sympathizers, a categorization that also included relatives of alleged Communists. In addition around 15,000 Soviet prisoners-of-war and Jews from other parts of Europe were killed in Estonia during the German occupation.

== Before the Holocaust ==
Prior to World War II, Jewish life flourished in Estonia with significant autonomy, allowing the local Jewish population to have full self-determination of education and other aspects of cultural life. In 1936, the British-based Jewish newspaper The Jewish Chronicle reported that "Estonia is the only country in Eastern Europe where ... Jews are left in peace and are allowed to lead a free and unmolested life and fashion it in accord with their national and cultural principles."

== Murders of Jews ==
Round-ups and killings of the remaining Jews began immediately; the first stage of Generalplan Ost required the "removal" of 50% of Estonians. The killings were undertaken by the extermination squad Einsatzkommando 1A (Sonderkommando) under Martin Sandberger, part of Einsatzgruppe A led by Walter Stahlecker, following the arrival of the first German troops on July 7, 1941. Arrests and executions continued as the Germans, with the assistance of local collaborators, advanced through Estonia, which became part of the Reichskommissariat Ostland. The Sicherheitspolizei (Security Police) was established for internal security under Ain-Ervin Mere in 1942. Estonia was declared Judenfrei quite early by the German occupation regime, at the Wannsee Conference. The Jews who remained in Estonia (929 according to the most recent calculation) were murdered. Fewer than a dozen Estonian Jews are known to have survived the war in Estonia.

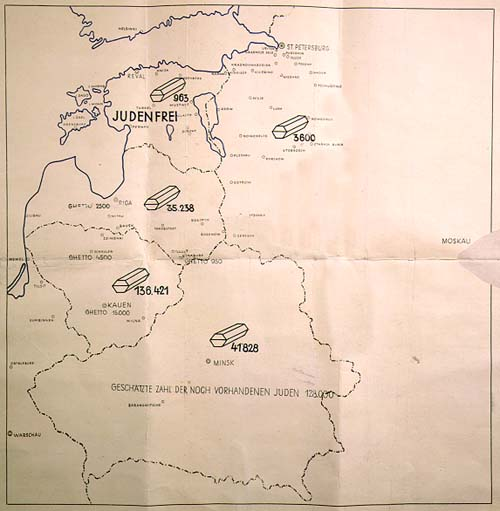
Map titled "Jewish Executions Carried Out by Einsatzgruppe A" from Stahlecker's report. Marked "Secret Reich Matter," the map shows the number of Jews shot in Ostland, and reads at the bottom: "the estimated number of Jews still on hand is 128,000". Estonia is marked as judenfrei.

=== German policy toward the Jews in Estonia ===
The Estonian state archives contain death certificates and lists of Jews executed dated July, August, and early September 1941. For example, the official death certificate of Rubin Teitelbaum, born in Tapa on January 17, 1907, states laconically in a form with item 7 already printed with only the date left blank: "7. By a decision of the Sicherheitspolizei on September 4, 1941, condemned to death, with the decision being carried out the same day in Tallinn." Teitelbaum's crime was "being a Jew" and thus constituting a "threat to the public order".

On September 11, 1941 an article entitled "Juuditäht seljal" – "A Jewish Star on the Back" appeared in the Estonian mass-circulation newspaper Postimees. It stated that Otto-Heinrich Drechsler, the High Commissioner of Ostland, had issued ordinances requiring all Jewish residents of Ostland from that day on to wear a visible yellow six-pointed Star of David at least 10 cm (4 in). in diameter on the left side of their chest and back.

On the same day regulations issued by the Sicherheitspolizei were delivered to all local police departments proclaiming that the Nuremberg Laws were in force in Ostland, defining who is a Jew, and what Jews could and could not do. Jews were prohibited from changing their place of residence, walking on the sidewalk, using any means of transportation, going to theatres, museums, cinema, or school. The professions of lawyer, physician, notary, banker, or real estate agent were declared closed to Jews, as was the occupation of street hawker. The regulations also declared that the property and homes of Jewish residents would be confiscated. The regulations emphasized that work to this end was to begin as soon as possible, and that police were to compile lists of Jews, their addresses, and their property by September 20, 1941.

The regulations also provided for the establishment of a concentration camp near the south-eastern Estonian city of Tartu. A later decision provided for the construction of a Jewish ghetto near the town of Harku, but this was never built. A small concentration camp was built there instead. The national archives contain material pertinent to the cases of about 450 Estonian Jews. They were typically arrested at home or in the street, taken to the local police station, and charged with the 'crime' of being Jews. They were either shot outright or sent to concentration camps and shot later. An Estonian woman, described the arrest of her Jewish husband:

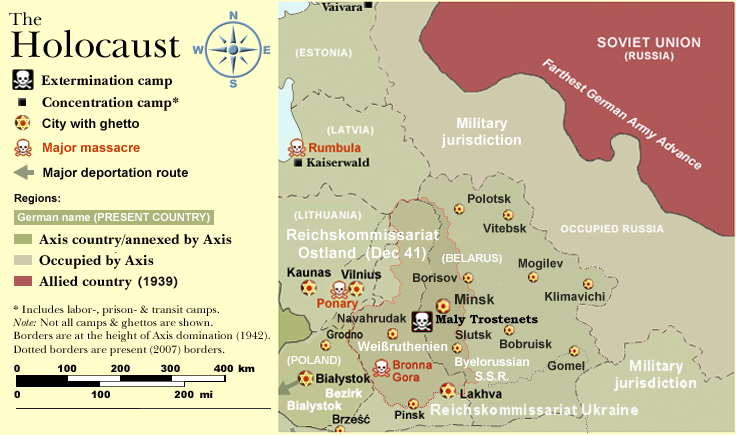
Holocaust in Reichskommissariat Ostland (which included Estonia): a map

... There were two men in our apartment from the Selbstschutz who said they were taking my husband to the police station. I ran after them and went to the chief officer and asked for permission to see my husband....On September 15 I went to the German Sicherheitspolizei on Tõnismägi in an attempt to get information about my husband. I was told he had been shot. I asked why, since he had not been a Communist but a businessman, The answer was: Aber er war doch ein Jude. ["But he was a Jew."].

== Foreign Jews ==
The Nazis intended mass genocide after the German invasion of Lithuania, Latvia and Estonia. Jews from countries outside the Baltics were deported there to be killed. An estimated 10,000 Jews were killed in Estonia after having been deported to camps there from elsewhere in eastern Europe. The Nazi regime established 22 Nazi concentration camps in occupied Estonian territory for foreign Jews, where they were slave labor. The largest, Vaivara concentration camp, served as a transit camp and processed 20,000 Jews from Latvia and the Lithuanian ghettos. Usually able-bodied men were selected to work in the oil shale mines in northeastern Estonia. Women, children, and old people were killed on arrival.

At least two trainloads of Central European Jews were deported to Estonia and were killed on arrival at the Kalevi-Liiva site near Jägala concentration camp.

=== Murder of foreign Jews at Kalevi-Liiva ===
According to testimony of the survivors, at least two transports with about 2,100–2,150 Central European Jews, arrived at the railway station at Raasiku, one from Theresienstadt (Terezín) with Czechoslovak Jews and one from Berlin with German citizens. Around 1,700–1,750 people were immediately taken to an execution site at the Kalevi-Liiva sand dunes and shot. About 450 people were selected for work at the Jägala concentration camp.

Transport Be 1.9.1942 from Theresienstadt arrived at the Raasiku station on September 5, 1942, after a five-day trip. According to testimony given to Soviet authorities by Ralf Gerrets, one of the accused at the 1961 war crimes trials in USSR, eight busloads of Estonian auxiliary police had arrived from Tallinn. The selection process was supervised by Ain-Ervin Mere, chief of Security Police in Estonia; those transportees not selected for slave labor were sent by bus to a killing site near the camp. Later the police, in teams of 6 to 8 men, killed the Jews by machine gun fire. During later investigations, however, some guards of camp denied the participation of police and said that executions were done by camp personnel. On the first day, a total of 900 people were murdered in this way. Gerrets testifies that he had fired a pistol at a victim who was still making noises in the pile of bodies. The whole operation was directed by SS commanders Heinrich Bergmann and Julius Geese. Few witnesses pointed out Heinrich Bergmann as the key figure behind the extermination of Estonian gypsies. In the case of Be 1.9.1942, the only ones chosen for labor and to survive the war were a small group of young women who were taken through a series of concentration camps in Estonia, Poland and Germany to Bergen-Belsen, where they were liberated. Camp commandant Laak used the women as sex slaves, killing many after they had outlived their usefulness.

A number of foreign witnesses were heard at the post-war trials in Soviet-occupied Estonia, including five women who had been transported on Be 1.9.1942 from Theresienstadt.

According to witness testimony, the accused Mere, Gerrets and Viik actively participated in mass killings and other crimes that were perpetrated by the Nazi invaders in Estonia. In accordance with the Nazi racial theory, the Sicherheitspolizei and Sicherheitsdienst were instructed to exterminate the Jews and Gypsies. To that end, during August and September of 1941, Mere and his collaborators set up a death camp at Jägala, 30 km (19 mi) from Tallinn. Mere put Aleksander Laak in charge of the camp; Ralf Gerrets was appointed his deputy. On 5 September 1942, a train with approximately 1,500 Czechoslovak citizens arrived at the Raasiku railway station. Mere, Laak and Gerrets personally selected who of them should be executed and who should be moved to the Jägala death camp. More than 1,000 people, mostly children, the old, and the infirm, were transported to a wasteland at Kalevi-Liiva, where they were executed in a special pit. In mid-September, the second troop train with 1,500 prisoners arrived at the railway station from Germany. Mere, Laak, and Gerrets selected another thousand victims, who were then condemned by them to extermination. This group of prisoners, which included nursing women and their newborn babies, were transported to Kalevi-Liiva where they were killed.
In March 1943, the personnel of the Kalevi-Liiva camp executed about fifty Romani people, half of whom were under 5 years of age. Also were executed 60 Roma children of school age...

== Romani people ==
Estimates of Estonian Roma victims vary around 1000, although some estimate the number as being over 2000. A number of adolescent Roma boys were also kept in a special facility for young criminals in Laitse, together with young people of other nationalities. Some of them were among the people who were compensated for their sufferings by the EVZ. A few witnesses pointed out Heinrich Bergmann as the key figure behind the extermination of Estonian Roma people.

== Estonian collaboration ==
Units of the Eesti Omakaitse (Estonian Home Guard; approximately 1000 to 1200 men) were directly involved in criminal acts, taking part in the round-up of 200 Roma people and 950 Jews.

Even during the preparatory phase of Operation Barbarossa, the military intelligence and security services of the Third Reich had been in contact with some members of the former Kaitseliit in order to gather information about the Red Army's armed forces, the mood of the population, and “potential” enemy elements. For the members of the former paramilitary organizations of the Baltic states, the armed forces of the Third Reich were an important potential ally in the fight against the Soviet occupying power. In the wake of the Hitler-Stalin Pact, German diplomats negotiated the “Rücksiedlung” of Baltic Germans “Heim ins Reich”, resulting in 61,858 Balts moving to the German Reich in early December 1939. Around 17,100 followed in 1941 during the “Nachrücksiedlung,” whereby, due to their experience with the Soviets, many Estonian military personnel and civil servants also attempted to declare themselves ethnic Germans and flee Estonia. Due to their coveted local knowledge the resettlers were courted and recruited in Germany by Heinrich Himmler's Schutzstaffel (SS), Reinhard Heydrich's rapidly growing military wing of the SS, the Waffen-SS, and intelligence services such as the Wehrmacht's Abwehr.

Due to the economic crisis in the interwar period, there was a socio-economic anti-Semitism within the Kaitseliit that called for economic restrictions on Jews, but racist, biological anti-Semitism did not meet with much sympathy, because the approximately 4,500 Jews in the country (0.4% of the total population) gave no reason to assume that they posed a “racist Jewish threat” to society. The ideologeme of the “Jewish Bolsheviks” was important, but originally not an essential part of the “fight against the Bolshevik threat.” It was only after the occupation by the Soviet Union that attitudes toward Jews, who were also blamed for the occupation of Estonia, became more radical. On the night of June 13-14, 1941 alone, local Red Militia, under the guidance of the NKVD and armed with lists, arrested around 10,200 Estonians, many of whom were subsequently deported. Throughout 1941, 61,000 Estonians fell victim to the soviet terror.

Many, if not most, partisans were hostile toward Jews. For them, Jews were a uniform mass, the embodiment of evil and all misfortune. Jews were also blamed for the Soviet occupation of Estonia because they had waited for the arrival of Soviet power. The word “Jew” was synonymous with ‘Communist’: “Jewish Kremlin,” “Jewish [Soviet] government,” “Jewish Molotov,” “Jewish violence,” “Jewish yoke,” “Jewish terror”. During the fighting of the “Forest Brothers” that lasted until September 1941, they also encountered resistance from Estonian Jews (about 400) who had been mobilized by the Soviets or had joined them. In June and September 1941, Omakaitse groups themselves organized “trials to determine the guilt of the Jews,” with suspects rarely escaping death.

From the outset, the German occupiers attempted to utilize the existing “physical” and “organizational” resources, which, as members of paramilitary organizations active prior to the occupation, possessed military skills, discipline, and a culture of subordination and could therefore be subordinated to the occupation structures as local auxiliary troops. To this end, the Kaitseliit combat groups were combined to form the “Omakaitse” service, whose responsibilities also included “special tasks.” Until September 22, 1941, command was entrusted to Jaan Maide, a former colonel in the Estonian regular army and former head of the Kaitseliit headquarters. Later, the activities of the Omakaitse were controlled by the Police and Self-Defense Authority (Estonian: Politseija Omakaitse Valitsus), which was subordinate to the Ministry of the Interior of the General Government of Estonia, headed by former Estonian Army Major Aleksander-Robert Tilgre. The Omakaitse had about 40,000 members, most of whom were members of the Estonian Kaitseliit, which had 35,000 to 42,700 members in 1939, or its youth organization (ages 8–17) Noored Kotkad (Young Eagles), which had 19,800 members in 1939.

Although the official tasks of the Omakaitse included protecting military infrastructure and fighting Soviet partisans in central Estonia, the tasks of this service did not differ significantly from those of the auxiliary police battalions and the security police (Sicherheitsdienst). They were frequently deployed for “actions” against partisans, to protect concentration and labor camps, and for “extermination actions” against groups considered “enemies” of the Third Reich: communists, Soviet activists, Jews, and Roma. The entire administration and security apparatus of the Tartu concentration camp was made up of members of the Omakaitse The camp commander was the former captain of the Estonian army, Friedrich Kurg, who had organized the establishment of a Jewish ghetto in Tartu on July 12, 1941. From July to September 1941, Kaitseliit members participated in mass executions of Jews in Tartu and the surrounding area. During this period, the Omakaitse also controlled the central prison in Tallinn and its branches in Jaagüla and Kalevi Lijva, where Jewish prisoners were also held.

By early 1942, 12 Estonian police battalions had been formed from the Omakaitse, which also participated in organized actions against Jews. Not only in Estonia, but also in other occupied areas of the Soviet Union: in November and December 1941 in Latvia in the Riga ghetto. In Lithuania in December 1941 during the liquidation of the Vilnius ghetto. In 1941, around 2,000 Omakaitse thugs carried out punitive actions against Soviet partisans and local resistance fighters in the Siege of Leningrad. In Belarus, they participated in the mass murder of Jews in Naugardukas on August 7, 1942.

In a total of around 5,000 operations, some 26,000 people were arrested, taken to prisons and concentration camps, or subjected to “special measures”. The Omakaitse thugs were particularly active in southern Estonia – in the Viru and Petsamo areas. Part of the former contingent of the Kaitseliit was deployed to protect the concentration and labor camps set up in Estonia (Klooga, Vaivara, Lagedi) and Poland (Lodź, Peremyšly, Žešuve, Tarnopol, and Izbica).

The final acts of liquidating the camps, such as Klooga, which involved the mass-shooting of roughly 2,000 prisoners, was facilitated by members of the 287th Police Battalion. Survivors report that, during these last days before liberation, when Jewish slave labourers were visible, the Estonian population in part attempted to help the Jews by providing food and other types of assistance.

== War crimes trials ==
Four Estonians deemed most responsible for the murders at Kalevi-Liiva were accused at the war crimes trials in 1961. Two were later executed, while the Soviet occupation authorities were unable to press charges against the other two due to the fact that they lived in exile. There have been 7 known ethnic Estonians (Ralf Gerrets, Ain-Ervin Mere, Jaan Viik, Juhan Jüriste, Karl Linnas, Aleksander Laak and Ervin Viks) who have faced trials for crimes against humanity committed during the Nazi occupation in Estonia. The accused were charged with murdering up to 5,000 German and Czechoslovak Jews and Romani people near the Kalevi-Liiva concentration camp in 1942–1943. Ain-Ervin Mere, commander of the Estonian Security Police (Group B of the Sicherheitspolizei) under the Estonian Self-Administration, was tried in absentia. Before the trial, Mere had been an active member of the Estonian community in England, contributing to Estonian-language publications. At the time of the trial, however, he was being held in custody in England, having been accused of murder. He was never deported and died a free man in England in 1969. Ralf Gerrets, the deputy commandant at the Jägala camp. Jaan Viik, (Jan Wijk, Ian Viik), a guard at the Jägala labor camp, out of the hundreds of Estonian camp guards and police, was singled out for prosecution due to his particular brutality. Witnesses testified that he would throw small children into the air and shoot them. He did not deny the charge. A fourth accused, camp commandant Aleksander Laak (Alexander Laak), was discovered living in Canada, but committed suicide before he could be brought to trial.

In January 1962, another trial was held in Tartu. Juhan Jüriste, Karl Linnas and Ervin Viks were accused of murdering 12,000 civilians in the Tartu concentration camp.

== Number of victims ==
Soviet-Estonian era sources estimate the total number of Soviet citizens and foreigners to be murdered in Nazi-occupied Estonian Soviet Socialist Republic to be 125,000. The bulk of this number consists of Jews from Central and Western Europe and Soviet prisoners-of-war killed or starved to death in prisoner-of-war camps on Estonian territory. The Estonian History Commission estimates the total number of victims to be roughly 35,000, consisting of the following groups:

- 1000 Estonian Jews,
- about 10,000 foreign Jews,
- 1000 Estonian Roma,
- 6000 ethnic Estonians,
- 15,000 Soviet POWs.

The number of Estonian Jews killed is less than 1,000; the German Holocaust perpetrators Martin Sandberger and Walter Stahlecker cite the numbers 921 and 963 respectively. In 1994 Evgenia Goorin-Loov calculated the exact number to be 929.

== Modern memorials ==
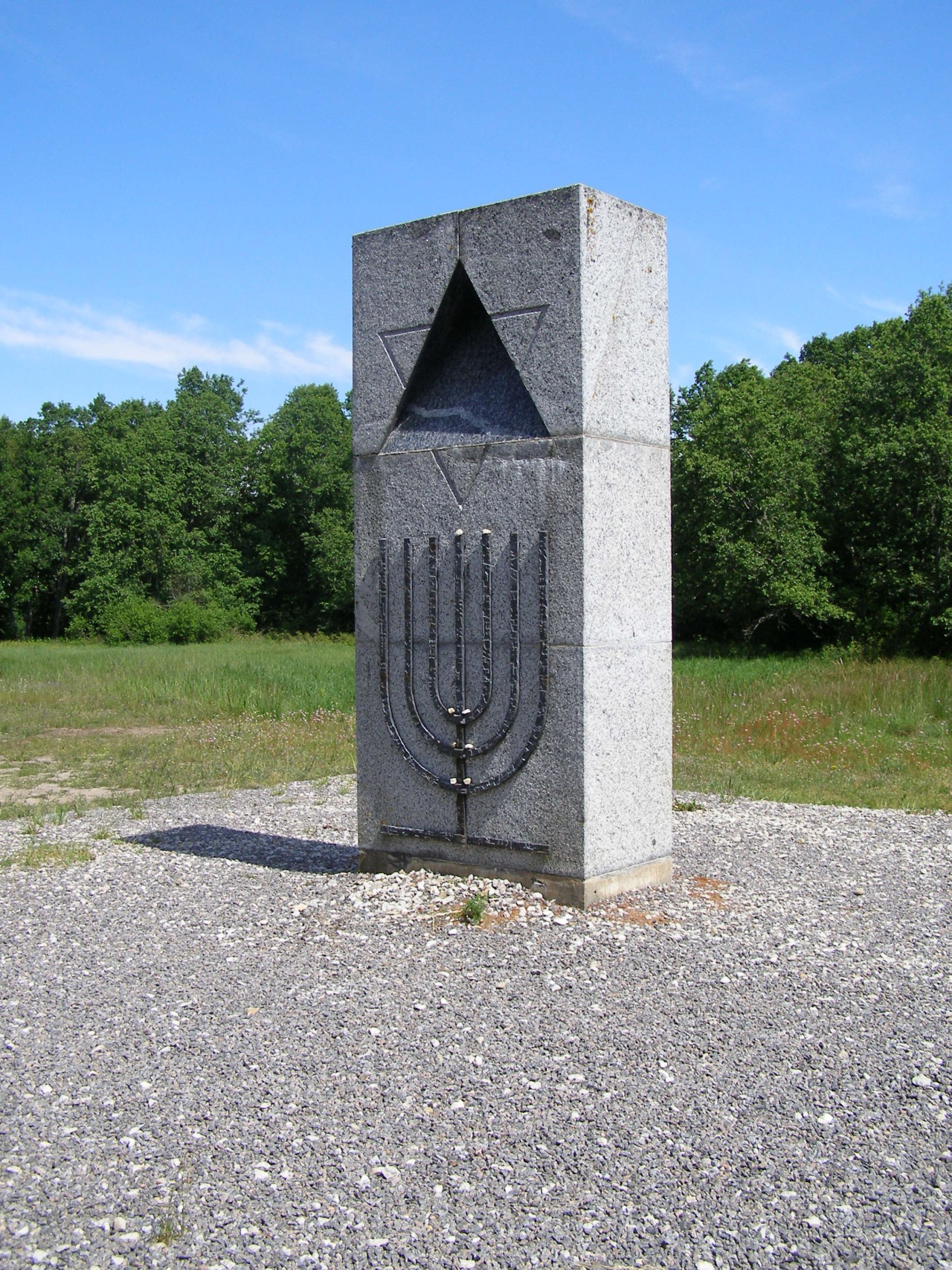
Holocaust memorial at the site of the former Klooga concentration camp, opened on July 24, 2005

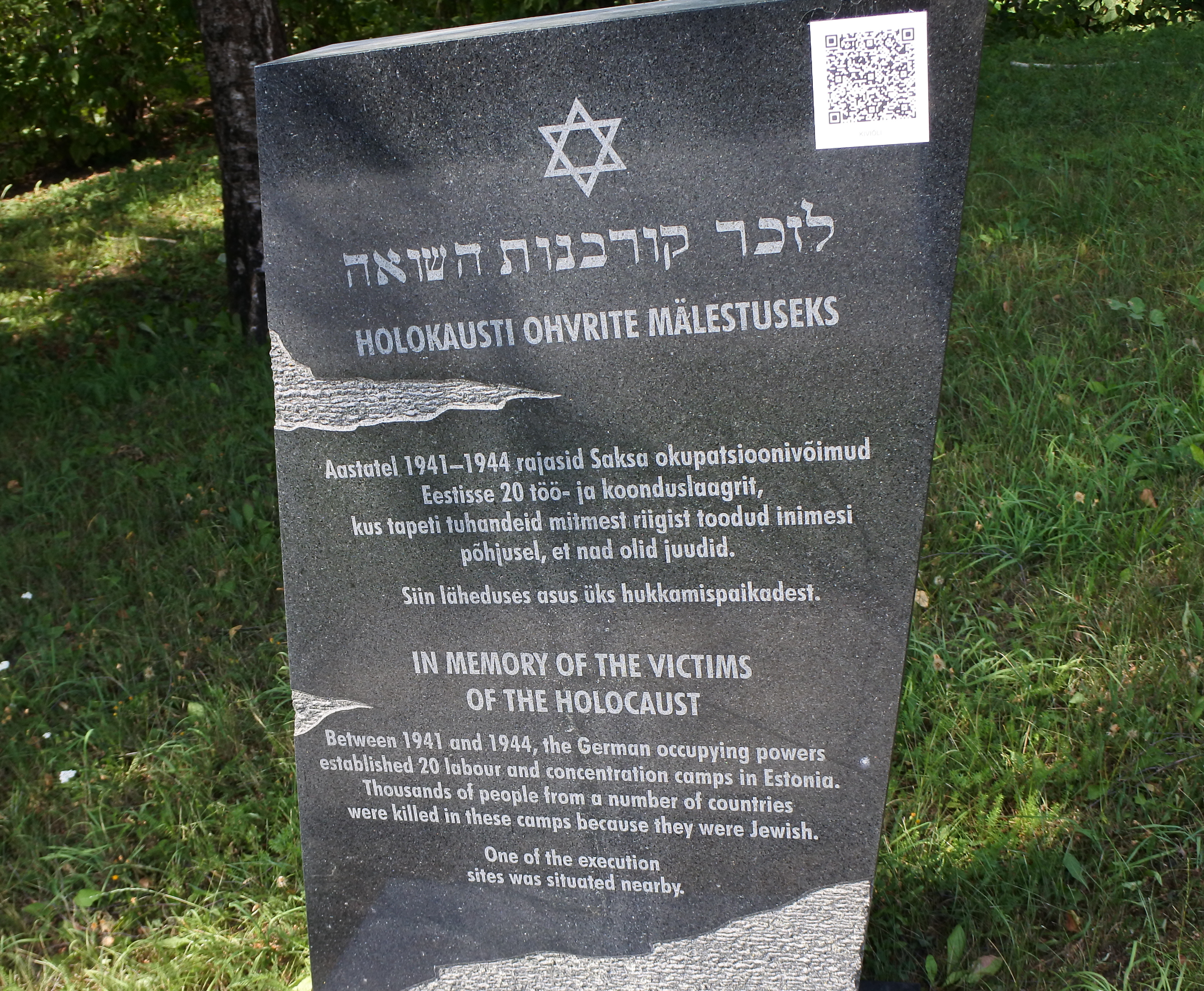
Kiviõli Concentration Camp Holocaust Memorial, northeastern Estonia.

Since the reestablishment of the Estonian independence, markers were put in place for the 60th anniversary of the mass executions that were carried out at the Lagedi, Vaivara and Klooga (Kalevi-Liiva) camps in September 1944. On February 5, 1945 in Berlin, Ain Mere founded the Eesti Vabadusliit together with SS-Obersturmbannführer Harald Riipalu. He was sentenced to the capital punishment during the Holocaust trials in Soviet Estonia but was not extradited by Great Britain and died there in peace. In 2002 the Government of the Republic of Estonia decided to officially commemorate the Holocaust. In the same year, the Simon Wiesenthal Center had provided the Estonian government with information on alleged Estonian war criminals, all former members of the 36th Estonian Police Battalion. In August 2018 it was reported that the memorial at Kalevi-Liiva was defaced.

== Concentration camps ==
=== KZ-Stammlager ===
- KZ Vaivara
  - Klooga

==== KZ-Außenlager ====
- KZ Aseri
- KZ Auvere
- KZ Erides
- KZ Goldfields (Kohtla)
- KZ Ilinurme
- KZ Jewe
- KZ Kerestowo (Karstala in Viru Ingria, now in Gatchinsky District)
- KZ Kiviöli
- KZ Kukruse
- KZ Kunda
- KZ Kuremaa
- KZ Lagedi
- KZ Klooga, Lodensee. Commandant SS-Untersturmführer Wilhelm Werle. (b. 1907, d. 1966),; September 1943 – September 1944. There were held 2 000 – 3 000 prisoners, most of them the Lithuanian Jews. When the Red Army approached, SS-men shot the 2 500 prisoners on September 19, 1944 and burned most of the bodies. The fewer than 100 prisoners succeeded in surviving by hiding. There is a monument on the location of the concentration camp.
- KZ Narva
- KZ Pankjavitsa, Pankjewitza. It was situated app. 15 km south of the village of Pankjavitsa near the hamlet of Roodva in the former Estonian province of Petserimaa. Since 1945 Russia occupies a large part of this province including Roodva/Rootova. The camp was established in November 1943. On 11 November that year 250 prisoners from Klooga arrived. Their accommodations were barracks. Already in January 1944 the camp was shut down and the inmates were relocated to Kūdupe (in Latvia near the Estonian border), Petseri and Ülenurme. Likely the camp was closed after some kind of work was finished. It was affiliated to the Vaivara camp.
- KZ Narwa-Hungerburg
- KZ Putki (in Piiri Parish, near Slantsy)
- KZ Reval (Ülemiste?)
- KZ Saka
- KZ Sonda
- KZ Soski (in Vasknarva Parish)
- KZ Wiwikond
- KZ Ülenurme

=== Arbeits- und Erziehungslager ===
- AEL Jägala (August 1942 – September 1943)
- AEL Murru
- AEL Reval
  - Harku (243 Estonian Romani people were executed in the Harku concentration camp on 27 October 1942)
  - Lasnamäe
- AEL Tartu (commandant Karl Linnas)
- AEL Turba (in Ellamaa)

==== Prisons ====
- Haapsalu
- Kuressaare
- Narva (in Vestervalli street, 1941–1944)
- Petseri
- Pärnu
- Tartu
- Valga
- Võru

=== Other concentration camps ===
- Dvigatel (in Tallinn)
- Essu
- Järvakandi
- Laitse
- Lavassaare
- Lehtse
- Lelle (1942 – May 1943)
- Roela
- Sitsi (in Tallinn, at the end of Tööstuse street where was 10 barracks; until 17 September 1944)
- Vasalemma

Additionally, at least one Estonian national was sent to Auschwitz.

== See also ==
- The Holocaust in Latvia
- The Holocaust in Lithuania
- Julius Genss
- Anti-communist mass killings

== Bibliography ==
- 12000: Tartus 16.-20.jaanuaril 1962 massimõrvarite Juhan Jüriste, Karl Linnase ja Ervin Viksi üle peetud kohtuprotsessi materjale. Karl Lemmik and Ervin Martinson. Eesti Riiklik Kirjastus. 1962
- Ants Saar, Vaikne suvi vaikses linnas. Eesti Raamat. 1971
- "Eesti vaimuhaigete saatus Saksa okupatsiooni aastail (1941–1944)", Eesti Arst, nr. March 3, 2007
- Ervin Martinson. Elukutse – reetmine. Eesti Raamat. 1970
- Ervin Martinson. Haakristi teenrid. Eesti Riiklik Kirjastus. 1962
- Inimesed olge valvsad. Vladimir Raudsepp. Eesti Riiklik Kirjastus. 1961
- Pruun katk: Dokumentide kogumik fašistide kuritegude kohta okupeeritud Eesti NSV territooriumil. Ervin Martinson and A. Matsulevitš. Eesti Raamat. 1969
- SS tegutseb: Dokumentide kogumik SS-kuritegude kohta. Eesti Riiklik Kirjastus. 1963
