= Jägala concentration camp =

Nazi concentration camp in Estonia

- Concentration camp
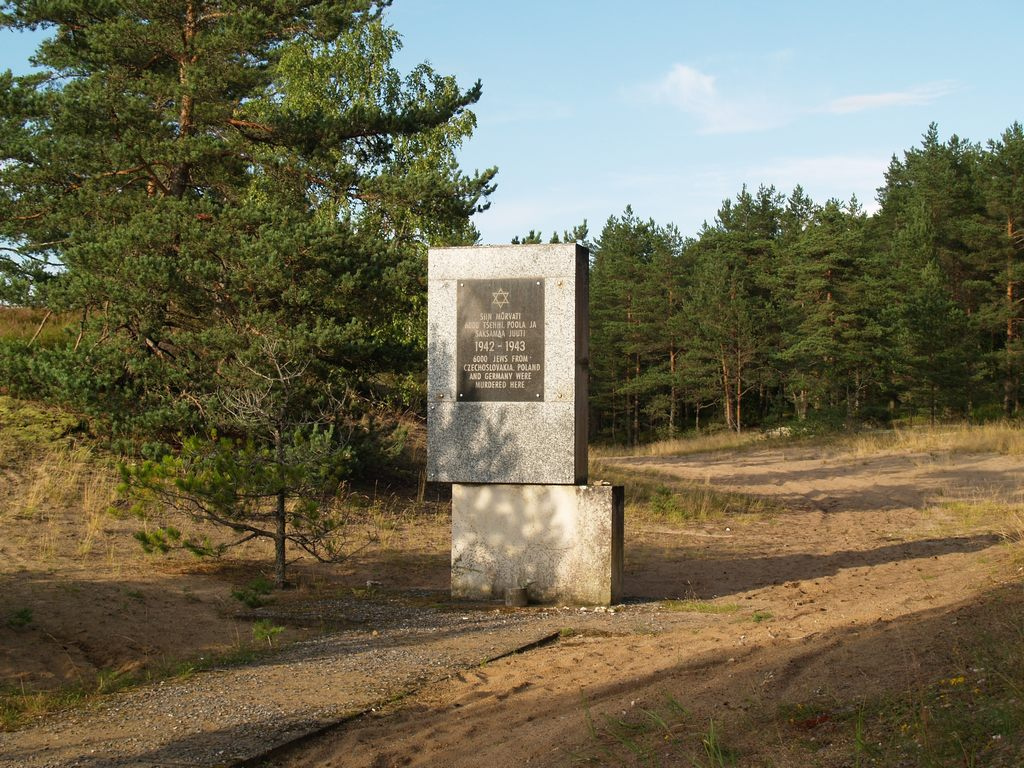
- Kalevi-Liiva Memorial to extermination camp victims (1942–1943)

- Location of Jägala in Estonia
- Coordinates: 59°25′N 25°14′E
- Operational: 1942–1943

Jägala concentration camp was a labour camp of the Estonian Security Police and SD during the German occupation of Estonia during World War II. The camp was established in August 1942 on a former artillery range of the Estonian Army near the village of Jägala, Estonia. It existed from August 1942 to August 1943. Aleksander Laak, an Estonian, was appointed by SS-Sturmbannführer Ain-Ervin Mere of Group B of the Estonian Security Police to command the camp with Ralf Gerrets as assistant.

Officially Jägala was a "labour education camp" or "Arbeitserziehungslager" for forced forestry and field workers. The camp housed Jews deported to Estonia from other countries, including Lithuania, Czechoslovakia, Germany and Poland. About 3,000 Jews who were not selected for work at their arrival at Raasiku railway station were taken directly from the station and shot at the nearby Kalevi-Liiva extermination site.

The camp never held more than 200 prisoners and had a short life span of several months. In November 1942 it was reported that the camp held 53 men and 150 women. Most of the prisoners were eventually transferred to Tallinn Central Prison starting with about half of the prisoners moved in December 1942 and the rest in June and July. By August 1943 the camp was closed and most of the remaining inmates were shot. Several sick prisoners were shot at the Jägala camp while about 15 hospitalised prisoners were sent to Kalevi-Liiva to be executed, Laak also killed three women, one of them his sex slave; the camp was then dismantled by September 1943.

The estimates for the number of killed at Jägala concentration camp vary. Soviet investigators concluded that 2,000-3,000 were killed in Jägala and Kalevi-Liiva taken together, but the number 5,000 (as determined by the Extraordinary State Commission in 1944) was written into the verdict.

In modern sources, the number of 10,000 people killed at the Jägala occurs. However, Estonian International Commission for Investigation of Crimes Against Humanity and estimates of scholars place the number of total Jewish victims in Estonia during 1941-1944 around 8,500.

== See also ==
- The Holocaust in Estonia
- Klooga concentration camp
- Vaivara concentration camp
- List of Nazi-German concentration camps
