= Aleksander Laak =

Estonian military personnel, Holocaust perpetrator

- Born: 24 August 1907; Pöide Parish, Kreis Ösel, Governorate of Livonia
- Died: 6 September 1960 (aged 53); Winnipeg, Manitoba, Canada
- Cause of death: Suicide by hanging
- Other name: Alexander Laak
- Known for: Commandant of Jägala concentration camp
- Motive: Nazism

Details
- Span of crimes: 1942–1943
- Country: German-occupied Estonia
- Location: Jägala concentration camp
- Killed: 2,000 – 10,000

Aleksander (Alexander) Laak (24 August 1907 – 6 September 1960) was a lieutenant and the commander of the Jägala concentration camp during the German occupation of Estonia.

The estimates for the number of killed at Jägala concentration camp vary widely. Initially, Soviet investigators concluded that 2,000–3,000 were killed in Jägala and Kalevi-Liiva taken together, however the Extraordinary State Commission raised this figure to 5,000 in their 1944 verdict.

Some modern sources offer estimates of 10,000 victims. Other commentators have given figures ranging from 100,000 (Michael Elkins, Jonathan Freedland) to 125,000-300,000 (Warren Kinsella). However, these figures contradict the findings of the Estonian International Commission for Investigation of Crimes Against Humanity, as well as scholars such as Wolfgang Benz, who places the total number of Jewish victims for Estonia between 1941–1944 at 8,500.

Laak was also reported to have arranged drunken orgies with female inmates, who were forced to participate and then murdered.

Laak emigrated to Canada after World War II, in 1948. In 1960, he was implicated in the Holocaust trials in Soviet Estonia, and exposed as living as a naturalized Canadian citizen under the name of Alex Laak in suburban Winnipeg, Manitoba, Canada by the Soviet news agency TASS and left-wing Canadian reporter Keith Rutherford.

After reading about the arrests of Jaan Viik and Ralf Gerrets (both of whom were later convicted of war crimes, sentenced to death, and executed in 1961), and being identified as a mass murderer himself, Laak committed suicide by hanging in the garage of his home on 6 September 1960. He was 53 years old. Prior to his death, he admitted to being a collaborator, but said he had nothing to do with Jägala.

It has been speculated that Laak was killed by vigilantes. Israeli journalist Michael Elkins claimed that, after his wife had left to go to the movies, Laak was confronted in his home by a Jewish Avenger squad that clandestinely murdered Nazis. Elkins claims he was confronted with his crimes, then offered a choice of execution or suicide, choosing the latter. An investigation of the death was reopened in 1991. Laak's friends have disputed this account, claiming he killed himself to protect relatives living in Canada and Estonia from potential reprisals.

== See also ==
- The Holocaust in Estonia
- Estonian Security Police and SD
