= Stolpersteine in Sázava =

Memorial installations in Czech Republic

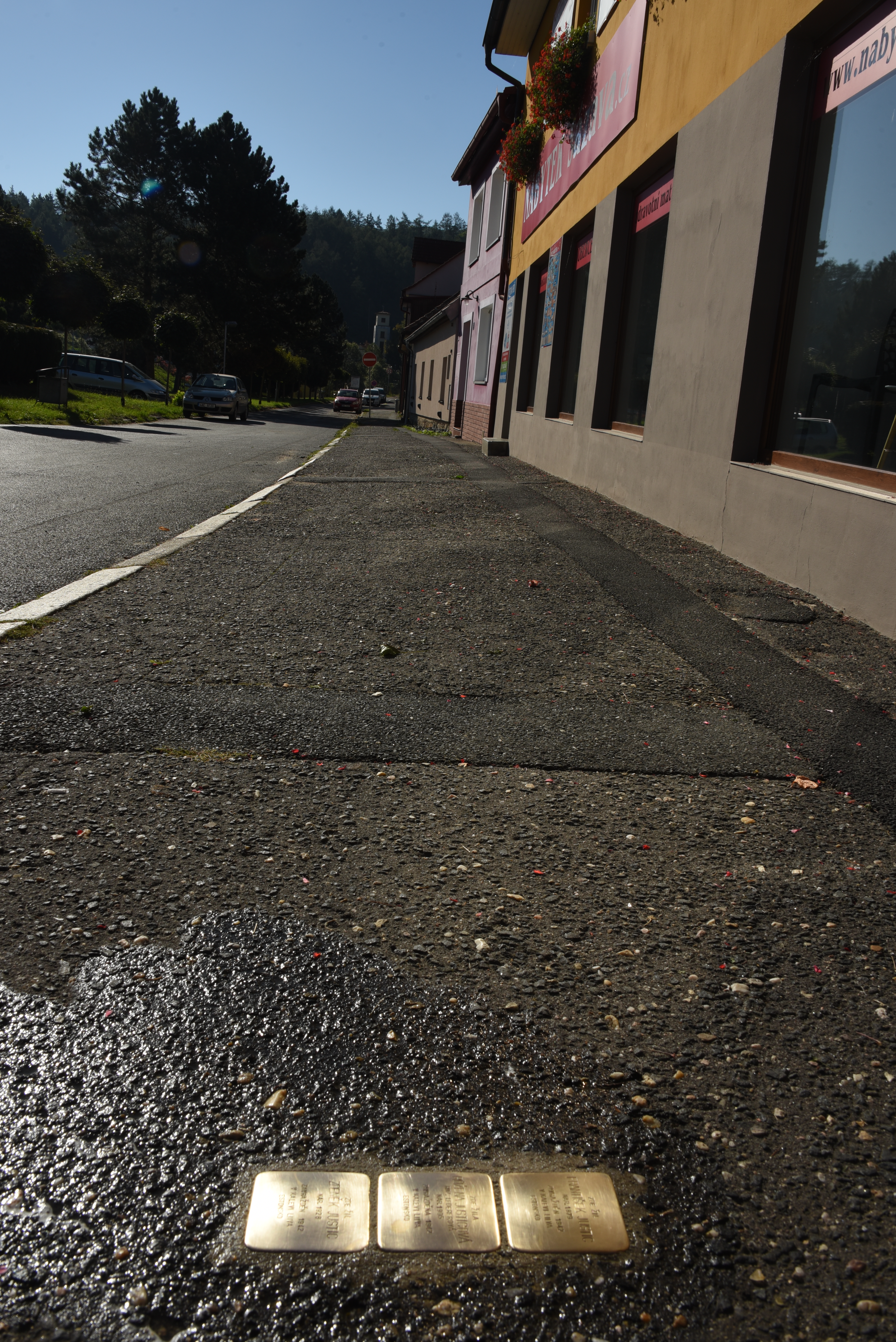
Stolpersteine in Sazava for family Justic

This article lists the Stolpersteine in Sázava, Czech Republic. Stolpersteine is the German word for the memorial plates placed throughout Europe by German artist Gunter Demnig. They commemorate the fate of Nazi victims who were murdered, deported, exiled or driven to suicide. The Stolpersteine in Sázava memorialize the three individuals who lived in the town who were deported and killed by the Nazi regime.

Generally, the Stolpersteine are installed in front of the building where the victims had their last self-chosen residence. In Czech the word is Kameny zmizelých, or "stones of the disappeared".

== Stolpersteine ==
The order of the list below is alphabetical according to the last name of the victim.

Stone	Inscription	Location	Life and death
	HERE LIVED; FRANTIŠEK JUSTIC; BORN 1879; MURDERED 1942; IN KALEVI-LIIVA; ESTONIA	Klášterní 47; 49.874722°N 14.895435°E	František Justic was born on 8 September 1897 in Výžerky. His father Josf Justic was a merchant. František Justic had eight siblings: Anna, Bozena, Olga, Marie, Zdenka, Heinrich, Vladimir (born 1893) and Karel (born 1901). On 12 June 1927 he married Růžena née Ledererová. The couple had at least one son: Zdeněk (born 1938). On 13 June 1942 František Justic, his wife and his son were deported by transport from Kolín to the Theresienstadt concentration camp. His transport number was 254. On 1 September 1942, the family was transported to Raasiku in Estonia. František Justic's transport number for the second journey was 700. In Kalevi-Liiva he, his wife and son were murdered by the Nazi regime. František's father, Josef Justic, was also deported to Theresienstadt on 13 June 1942 (his transport number was 253). Three months later, on 17 September 1942, he died at the concentration camp. The official reason for his death was cardiac insufficiency. His brother Vladimir Justic was deported from Prague to Theresienstadt in 1942 and was then, like his brother, transported to Raasiku and murdered there. Vladimir's son Jan was also deported and murdered. Karel Justic was also deported with transport AAd (his transport number was 249) and murdered in Auschwitz concentration camp in 1944.
	HERE LIVED; ZDENĚK JUSTIC; BORN 1928; MURDERED 1942; IN KALEVI-LIIVA; ESTONIA	Klášterní 47; 49.874722°N 14.895435°E	Zdeněk Justic was born on 30 April 1938. His parents were František Justic and Růžena Justicová. Together with his parents, Zdeněk was deported on 13 June 1942 with transport AAd from Kolín to the concentration camp Theresienstadt. His transport number was 256. On 1 September 1942, the family was deported by transport Be to Raasiku in Estonia. His transport number was 746. Zdeněk Justic and his parents were murdered by the Nazi regime in Kalevi-Liiva.
	HERE LIVED; RŮŽENA JUSTICOVÀ; NÉE LEDEREROVÁ; BORN 1905; MURDERED 1942; IN KALEVI-LIIVA; ESTONIA	Klášterní 47; 49.874722°N 14.895435°E	Růžena Justicová, née Ledererová was born on 11 December 1905 in Dymokury. She was the daughter of Josef Lederer and Josefine née Bendová. On 12 June 1927, she married František Justic (see above). The couple had at least one son: Zdeněk (born 1938, see above). She was deported together with husband and son on 13 June 1942 by transport AAd from Kolín to the concentration camp Theresienstadt. Her transport number was 255. On 1 September 1942, the family was deported by transport Be to Raasiku in Estonia. Her transport number was 745. Růžena Justicová, her husband and her son were murdered by the Nazi regime in Kalevi-Liiva. Her mother Josefina Lederová was also deported to Theresienstadt. The transport AAd left on 13 June 1942, her number was the 257. From there she was deported to the Treblinka extermination camp on 22 October 1942. She was murdered there immediately after arrival. In memory of her, a memorial stone was laid in Liberec in 2016.

== Dates of collocations ==
The Stolpersteine in Sázava were installed by the artist on 20 September 2017.

== See also ==
- List of places with Stolpersteine
