= History Commission =

History Commission may refer to:

- Presidential Commission of the Russian Federation to Counter Attempts to Falsify History to the Detriment of Russia's Interests, controversial commission against anti-Russian propaganda
- Estonian International Commission for Investigation of Crimes Against Humanity, commission investigating crimes during the Soviet and German occupation in World War II
