= Tartu Synagogue =

Former Orthodox synagogue in Tartu, Estonia

- Estonian: Tartu sünagoog
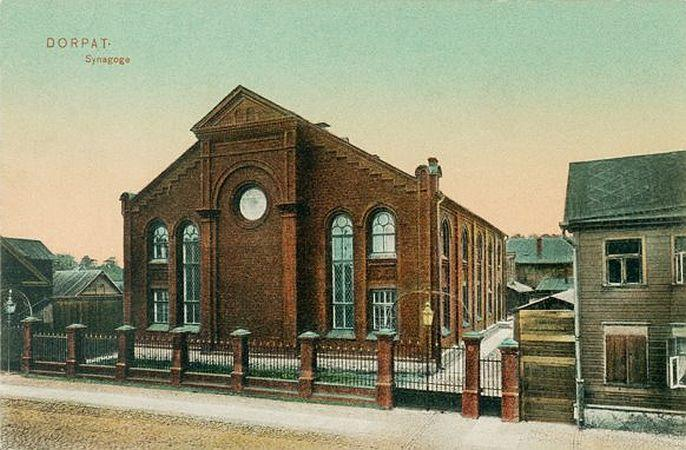
- A postcard of the former synagogue

- Location of the destroyed synagogue in Estonia

Religion
- Affiliation: Orthodox Judaism (former)
- Ecclesiastical or organizational status: Synagogue (1903–1944)
- Status: Closed; destroyed

Location
- Location: Tartu
- Country: Estonia
- Interactive map of Tartu Synagogue
- Coordinates: 58°22′30″N 26°44′00″E

Architecture
- Architect: R. Pohlmann
- Type: Synagogue architecture
- Completed: 1903
- Destroyed: 1944

Website
- muuseum.jewish.ee

The Tartu Synagogue (Estonian: Tartu sünagoog) was an Orthodox Jewish synagogue, that was located in Tartu, Estonia.

The synagogue was built in 1903 and was designed by a local architect R. Pohlmann.

The synagogue was destroyed during World War II. Many of the synagogue's items were saved and can be seen in Estonian National Museum.

== See also ==
- History of the Jews in Estonia
- The Holocaust in Estonia
