= War crimes trials in Soviet Estonia =

A number of war crimes trials were held during the Soviet occupation of Estonia (1944–1991). The best-known trial was brought in 1961, by the Soviet authorities against local collaborators who had participated in the Holocaust during the German occupation (1941–1944). The accused were charged with murdering up to 5,000 German and Czechoslovak Jews and Romani people near the Jägala concentration camp in 1942–1943. The public trial by the Supreme Court of the Estonian SSR was held in the auditorium of the Navy Officers Club in Tallinn and attended by a mass audience. All three defendants were convicted and sentenced to death, one in absentia. The two defendants present for the trial were executed shortly after. The third defendant, Ain-Ervin Mere, was not available for execution.

A second trial was held in Tartu in 1962. The accused Estonian collaborators were charged with killing Soviet citizens and were sentenced to death in absentia. The trial verdict and testimony were inadvertently published in the magazine Sotsialisticheskaya zakonnost ('Socialist Legality') before the trial began.

== The trials ==
=== The accused ===
- Ain-Ervin Mere, commander of the Estonian Security Police and SD (Group B of the Sicherheitspolizei) under the Estonian Self-Administration, was tried in absentia. Before the trial he was an active member of the Estonian community in England, contributing to Estonian-language publications. At the time of the trial he was however held in captivity, accused of murder. He was never deported and died a free man in England in 1969.
- Ralf Gerrets, the deputy commandant at the Jägala concentration camp. He was executed by shooting on March 31, 1961, at the age of 55.
- Jaan Viik, (Jan Vijk, Ian Viik), a guard at the Jägala concentration camp was singled out for prosecution out of the hundreds of Estonian camp guards and police for his particular brutality. He was accused of throwing small children into the air and shooting them. He did not deny the charge. Viik was executed by shooting on March 31, 1961, at the age of 44. Viik had already served time in prison prior to his trial. In 1946, he was sentenced to 10 years in prison for voluntarily serving in a concentration camp.
- A fourth accused, Aleksander Laak, the commandant of Jägala concentration camp, was discovered in Canada; he committed suicide in 1960.

=== The crimes ===
While the accused may have been involved in other crimes against humanity during the German occupation of Estonia, the trial focused on the events of September 1942. According to testimony of the survivors, at least two transports with about 2,100–2,150 people, arrived at the railway station at Raasiku, one from Theresienstadt concentration camp with Czechoslovak Jews and one from Berlin with German Jews. Around 1,700–1,750 people, mainly Jews, not selected for work at the Jägala camp were taken to Kalevi-Liiva and shot.

Transport Be 1.9.1942 from Theresienstadt arrived at the Raasiku station on September 5, 1942, after a five-day trip. According to testimony by one of the accused, Gerretts, eight busloads of Estonian auxiliary police had arrived from Tallinn. A selection process was supervised by Ain-Ervin Mere, chief of Sicherheitspolizei in Estonia; those not selected for slave labor were sent by bus to an execution site near the camp. Later the police in teams of 6 to 8 men would execute the Jews by machine gun fire, on other hand, during later investigation some guards of camp denied participation of police and said that execution was done by camp personnel. On the first day a total of 900 people were murdered in this way. Gerrets told that he had fired a pistol at a victim who was still making noises in the pile of bodies. The whole operation was directed by Obersturmführer Heinrich Bergmann and Oberscharführer Julius Geese.

Usually able bodied men were selected to work on the oil shale mines in northeastern Estonia. Women, children, and old people would be executed on arrival. In the case Be 1.9.1942 however, the only ones chosen for labor and to survive the war were a small group of young women who were taken through concentration camps in Estonia, Poland and Germany to Bergen- Belsen, where they were liberated. Camp commandant Laak used the women as sex slaves, killing at least one who refused to comply.

According to an article published by the journal "Contemporary European History" in 2001,

In 1942, transports of Jews from other countries arrived, and their murder and incarceration in slave labour camps was organised and supervised by German and Estonian officials (including Mere and the German head of A-IV). The final acts of liquidating the camps, such as Klooga, which involved the mass-shooting of roughly 2,000 prisoners, were committed by Estonians under German command, that is by units of the 20.SS-Division and (presumably) the Schutzmannschaftsbataillon of the KdS. Survivors report that, during this period when Jewish slave labourers were visible, the Estonian population in part attempted to help the Jews by providing food and so on.

The Estonian International Commission for the Investigation of Crimes Against Humanity rests the responsibility for such crimes mainly on 2.5–4 % of the Estonian Omakaitse civil defence units and the Estonian Security Police. A number of foreign witnesses were heard at the trial, including five women, who had been transported on Be 1.9.1942 from Theresienstadt.

=== The verdict ===
The accused Mere, Gerrets and Viik actively participated in crimes and mass killings that were perpetrated by the Nazi invaders on the territory of the Estonian SSR. In accordance with Fascist racial theory, the Sicherheitspolizei and Sicherheitsdienst were instructed to exterminate the Jews and Gypsies. For that end in August–September 1941 Mere and his collaborators set up a death camp at Jägala, 30 km from Tallinn. Mere put Aleksander Laak in charge of the camp; Ralf Gerrets was appointed his deputy. On 5 September 1942 a train with approximately 1,500 Czechoslovak citizens arrived to the Raasiku railway station. Mere, Laak and Gerrets personally selected who of them should be executed and who should be moved to the Jägala death camp. More than 1,000 people, mostly children, the old, and the infirm, were translocated to a wasteland at Kalevi-Liiva where they were monstrously executed in a special pit. In mid-September the second troop train with 1,500 prisoners arrived to the railway station from Germany. Mere, Laak, and Gerrets selected another thousand victims that were condemned by them to extermination. This group of prisoners, which included nursing women and their new-born babies, were transported to Kalevi-Liiva where they were killed. In March 1943 the personnel of the Kalevi-Liiva camp executed about fifty Gypsies, half of which were under 5 years of age. Also were executed 60 Gypsy children of school age...

Quoted from the verdict passed on 11 March 1961, published in Немецко-фашистская оккупация в Эстонии. 1941–1944. Tallinn, 1963. Pages 53–54.

Original documents related to the Mere-Gerrets-Viik trial are to be found in Estonian State Archives – Party Archives Branch – ERA PA, Collection 129, boxes 63–70.

Mere, Gerrets, Viik and were all sentenced to death. Gerrets and Viik were both executed by shooting on March 31, 1961. Gerrets was 55 and Viik was 44.

== Tartu trials ==
By the early 1960s, the Soviet government was pursuing Juhan Jüriste, Karl Linnas and Ervin Viks, who were accused of murdering 12,000 people in the Tartu concentration camp. A more recent estimate concluded that the number was around 3,500 people, mainly Estonian and Estonian Jews as well as some Soviet POWs and Jews from Poland and Czechoslovakia. According to an official Soviet account: "the main culprit, Ervin Viks, fled the ire of the people and now lives in Australia, whereas Linnas found shelter in the USA". The Soviet authorities requested the extradition of both men, but against the background of the Cold War, were flatly refused.

In January 1962, a show trial was conducted with the three accused [Jüriste present and Linnas and Viks absent] men tried in absentia in Tartu and sentenced to death on 20 January 1962. The transcript and verdict of the trial were published in the magazine Sotsialisticheskaya zakonnost (Soviet Jurisprudence) in December before the trial had even occurred. The actual trial started in January the following year, delayed because one of the defendants was ill. Jüriste was executed on March 16, 1962, at the age of 65.

During the trials in Tallinn and Tartu several witnesses pointed out Heinrich Bergmann as the key figure behind the extermination of Estonian Romani people.

The Australian Attorney General, Sir Garfield Barwick, continued to reject extradition requests for Viks, saying that since the USSR and Australia did not have an extradition treaty and Viks had passed immigration screening processes, any such extradition would undermine Australian sovereignty. Viks died in Australia in 1983.

In 1987, Linnas was deported to the USSR, after a US federal appeals court had deemed evidence against him "overwhelming and largely uncontroverted." The American judge remarked that his crimes "were such as to offend the decency of any civilized society." Linnas died in a Soviet prison hospital, reportedly of old age, in the same year, 1987.

== See also ==
- Occupation of the Baltic states
- Soviet war crimes
- Soviet deportations from Estonia
