= Julius Genss =

Estonian art historian (1887–1957)

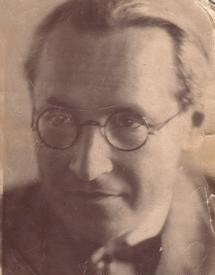
- Born: 17 November 1887; Dorpat, Estonian Governorate of the Russian Empire
- Died: 3 February 1957 (aged 69); Tallinn, Estonia
- Occupation: Art historian

Julius Genss (in Heb. יולי גענס) (born 17 [O.S. 1887] 11 in Dorpat, Estonian Governorate of the Russian Empire; died 3 February 1957, in Tallinn as Julius Gens, Estonian SSR) was an Estonian bibliophile, art collector, art critic and patron.

== Life ==
Julius (Idel) Genss was born into a wealthy merchant family in Tartu (then Derpt). He discovered his passion for painting and graphic art at an early age. From 1906 to 1911 he studied at the Faculty of Law at the University of Tartu (then the Imperial University of Yuryev). While studying law, Genss began to take painting lessons.

In 1911/12, he studied painting and architecture at the Technical University of Munich and visited art collections in Germany and Italy.

=== Book and art collector ===
He travelled to Moscow and made acquaintance with the Cubofuturists there such as Alexei Jelissejewitsch Krutschonych, Wladimir Majakowski and Dawid Burljuk, as well as with Russian avant-gardists Mikhail Larionov and Natalia Goncharova.

After his return to Tartu in 1918, he began to build up a private art collection. From 1920, he lectured at the Tartu School of Art, campaigned for Jewish cultural autonomy in Estonia, which was realized in 1925, and was an active member of Pallas, the Estonian Society of Artists and Writers. As a delegate of the Academic Association for Jewish History and Literature, he represented the Estonian Jewish cultural community at the Second Congress of Anti-Fascist Writers in Madrid in 1937.

In 1934, he became the manager of the Estonian branch of a Swedish timber trading company. He moved with his family from Tartu to the Estonian capital Tallinn. By 1939, he had amassed a large art library in the Baltic region as well as a large art collection, the largest sections of which were dedicated to Estonian, Russian and Jewish art.

=== Evacuation, loss of the collection and political persecution ===
In the summer of 1940, Estonia was occupied by the Soviet Union. A year later, the German Wehrmacht conquered the Baltic states. In July 1941, the Genss family had to leave Tallinn to escape the persecution of Estonian Jews by the German occupying forces. They were evacuated to Tashkent.

In 1941, the art collection and library were housed in the Tallinn Art Museum, which was destroyed in the Soviet bombing raid on Tallinn in 1944. However, the library and the graphic art collection had previously been confiscated by the Einsatzstab Reichsleiter Rosenberg (ERR). As Alfred Rosenberg was also from Tallinn, he was well acquainted with Julius Genss' collection. The library, consisting of over 10,000 art-historical volumes, was later sent to Ratibor. In November 1944, Rosenberg reported 61 boxes of the Genss collection in the barracks in Pless, which were named among the most important for removal to Minsk. 6,000 volumes were eventually transported there and handed over to the local library of the Academy of Sciences. 780 volumes bearing the stamp of the Tallinn Art Museum (Genss had loaned these books to the museum before the war) were handed over to the Estonian Academy of Sciences Library.

Genss filed several claims for restitution, but these were unsuccessful. The collection has still not been returned to its owner.

In 1951, Genss was arrested after being accused of cosmopolitanism, despite his unstable state of health following two heart attacks. He died in Tallinn in February 1957. Julius Genss is buried in the Jewish cemetery in Tallinn-Rahumäe.

== Family ==
Julius Genss was married to Bertha Genss. Their son Leo Gens (1922-2001) was an important Estonian art historian, but was temporarily banned from his profession during the Soviet era (in the early 1950s), a professor of art history at the Estonian Academy of Fine Arts and a prizewinner at the Royal Swedish Academy of Fine Arts. His daughter Inna Gens (1928-2014) was a famous art historian of Japanese cinema and writer. As a film critic, she received the "Kawakita Award" in 1991 for outstanding services to Japanese film. Her granddaughter Julia Gens emigrated to Germany in 1991. She lives as an art restorer in Munich.

== Legal heirs ==
- 1957-2014 Inna Gens (daughter)
- 2014- Julia Gens (granddaughter)

== Collections ==
=== Book collection ===
By 1941, Julius Genss had amassed one of the largest art libraries in the Baltic region as well as a considerable art collection with sections of Estonian, Jewish and Russian art, as well as a large collection of ex-libris and prints.

Genss described his relationship with books as the greatest passion of his life. He had amassed over 10,000 volumes in his collection. These included art-historical volumes as well as magazines for bibliophiles such as Philobiblon, illustrated volumes and rarities. Every new book in the collection was cataloged. Judaica formed a focal point of the collection, which mainly consisted of items from France, Russia and Germany.

=== Shir Hashirim (Song of Songs) ===
Genss commissioned a version of the Song of Songs (Shir Hashirim), which was created according to his ideas in the artistic design of Ado Vabbe in 1932. The parchment scroll, measuring 527 cm × 52.5 cm, contains the Song of Songs in Hebrew and has eight illustrations in tempera by Vabbe. Genss himself designed the text in Hebrew script, the vignettes and the initials.

=== Art collection ===
Genss himself organized three exhibitions of his collection. He had several owner's stamps; he ordered four used bookplates, each in an edition of 2,000, so that the book's inclusion in the library could later be traced on the basis of these. He ordered some bookplates from the Estonian avant-garde artist, painter and graphic artist Ado Vabbe (1892-1961). In addition to the four commercial ex-libris, Genss also owned a luxury ex-libris. He received this as a gift from the Parisian artist Fiszel Zylberberg (1909-1942, murdered in Auschwitz) in an edition of 40. The luxury bookplate was used to decorate magnificent volumes of Judaica in the collection.

The graphics collection consisted of almost 3,000 sheets, including works by Marc Chagall, Lyonel Feininger, Paul Klee, Léon Bakst, El Lissitzky and Konstantin Korovin. Many objects from the Genss collection are scattered in museums all over the world.

=== Judaica collection ===
His interest in Jewish art had grown in the meantime. On his travels, Genss visited synagogues and Jewish museums, acquired catalogs and specialist literature. His Judaica collection continued to grow, and in 1938/39 he organized a travelling exhibition that was presented in Tartu, Tallinn and Riga: "I wanted to prove the existence of modern Jewish art," he later wrote in his memoirs.

Artists from Paris, Warsaw, Vilnius, even Israel and the Soviet Union sent him prints and illustrations at his request. This resulted in 211 sheets. An exhibition catalog was published - in Estonian and in Yiddish, the common idiom among the Jews of Eastern Europe at the time. Marc Chagall and Lyonel Feininger contributed prints, artists who are world-famous today. But few people still know the names of the others involved. Some, such as Nathan Altman or Zygmunt Dobrzycki, survived the Holocaust. Data on others, such as Necha Gelbersanska, Julius Kroll and Isaak Schorr, could not be obtained. Fani Lewowna-Frydman was murdered in Krakow, Fiszel Zylberberg in Auschwitz.

Granddaughter Julia Gens came to Berlin in 1991. She brought with her the fragments of her grandfather's destroyed collection. Among them was a particularly valuable piece: a scroll with the Song of Solomon, written in Hebrew by Genss himself in the early 1930s and illustrated by his friend, the Estonian artist Ado Vabbe. There was also a facsimile of the Darmstadt Haggadah from 1430.

=== The exhibition "Jewish graphics by Julius Genss" ===
Julius Genss' aim was to prove the existence of contemporary Jewish art and, as the transportation of oil paintings was too expensive and, above all, too risky in these times, he decided to show only graphic art. Among the artists were famous names such as Max Liebermann and Marc Chagall.

In 1938/39, Julius Genss organized the travelling exhibition Jewish Graphic Art. His aim was to prove the existence of contemporary Jewish graphic art. Of the 211 works of art exhibited in 1938/39, only 35 graphic works still exist today. Polish artists were the most fully represented, contributing eleven prints from Paris, Warsaw, Vilnius and the USA. The German graphic artist Hermann Struck sent him exhibits from Tel Aviv. Among the Soviet artists, Solomon Judowin was represented in the exhibition. The art school in Vilnius sent works by Jewish students. Among the renowned masters, Chagall, Israëls and Liebermann were exhibited, as well as ornaments by Natan Altman. The exhibition opened in Tartu in May 1938 and was subsequently shown in Tallinn and Riga.

In 1941, the collection was confiscated by the "Einsatzstab Reichsleiter Rosenberg", which systematically plundered Jewish cultural treasures in Eastern Europe. It was only thanks to the commitment of one individual that three dozen sheets from this collection were preserved and came to Munich with granddaughter Julia Gens. Julius Genss had a professor from his home town of Tartu to thank for the fact that some of it could be saved at all. His daughter Inna Gens recalls in an interview with Deutsche Welle: "Paul Ariste had worked in the Rosenberg task force. He was always stealing things there and took a piece of my father's Jewish graphics collection home with him. When we came back, he was kind enough to give it back to us."

The role of Paul Ariste (then Paul Arriste) was not always positive. According to ERR reports (#61432592 page: 208) quote: "...mainly on the basis of the information provided by the university lecturer Dr. Arriste, the following apparently definitive statements were made about the current whereabouts of the library of the Jew Genss:..."

In 2012, fragments of the Julius Genss collection were shown as part of an exhibition "Jews 45/90" (July 2012 - January 2013) at the Jewish Museum Munich. It was a very special experience for Inna Gens: "My father studied here in Munich. I could never have imagined that an exhibition like this could be organized in Germany. That makes me very happy, of course."

An investigation suggested that the looted collection might be in Belarus.

== Books and publications ==
- Katalog der Bibliotheck [von] Julius Genss, Th. 1-4, 1928–1930
- V.Timmi kirjad, Tartu, Postimees, 1930.
- Huvitav siluettide leid, Tartu, 1930.
- Briefe Wilhelm Timḿs an seinen Vater aus den Jahren 1841–1846, Dorpat, 1931.
- Eesti Rahva Muuseumi kunstiosakond: keraamika, Tallinn, 1931.
- Elevandiluu, Tartu, Postimees, 1931.
- Netsuke, Tartu, Postimees, 1931.
- Заметки библиофила, Tallinn, Postimees, 1932.
- Nõukogude Vene kunstinäitus. Postimees, 2. Mai 1934.
- Биография У.Г.Иваск Еврейская периодическая печать в России, Таллинн, 1935.
- Ed. Viiraldi ex-libriseid, Tallinn, 1935.
- Kunstipärase exlibrise näituse kataloog, Tallinn, Tallinna Eesti Kirjastus-Ühisus, 1935.
- Eesti kunstnike originaalgraafika albumid bibliograafiline kirjeldus, Tallinn, 1937.
- Eduard Wiiralt loob gravüüri, Tallinn, 1937.
- Tlingiti ja haida kunsti Eesti muuseumides, Tartu : s.n., 1937.
- Juudi graafika, Tallinn, 1938.
- יידישע גראפיק ,יידישער קולטור־פארוואלטונג אין עסטי, Tallinn, 1938.
- Ausstellungskatalog Juudi graafika: Tartu – Tallinn, aprill – mai 1938. a., Tallinn : Libris, 1938.
- Mit Eduard Ahas u. a.: Kunstiühing Pallas: 1918–1938, Noor-Eesti, 1938.
- Mit Anne Krebsbach und Edit Käärik, Katalog zu Ausstellung Idamaa kunst ja vaibad : Kunstihoones 29. okt. - 4. nov. 1938, Tallinna Eesti Kirjastus-Ühisus, Tallinn, 1938.
- Julius Genssi Raamatukogu Kataloog: יולי גענס ביבליאטעק. I טייל ביכער וועגן ביכער יודאיקא, Bd. 1, Tallinn, Libris, 1939.
- Каталог библиотеки и собрания Юлия Генса, Том 1 – 4, Tallinn, Libris, 1939.
- Book about books, Tallinn : [s.n.], 1939.
- Eksliibriseid aastaist 1936–1939 RaKü 6. rakenduskunsti näitus : Tallinn, Kunstihoones, 15.-27.IV 1939.
- Üleliidulise põllumajandusnäituse arhitektuur. Ajakiri Viisnurk N1, 1940.
- Karl Timoleon Neff, Tallinn, 1940.
- Ilja Repin (1844–1930). Ajakiri Viisnurk, Oktober 1940.
- Katalog zu Ausstellung Leningradi ja Moskva kunstnike värvilise graafika, Tallinn, Riigi Trükikoda, 1941.
- Lermontovi teoste illustreeritud väljaandeist. Ajakiri Viisnurk. Mai/Juni, 1941.
- Udo Ivask ja tema tegevus raamatumärkide harrastajana, Tallinn, 1941.
- Album Eesti tööline, Tallinn, Eesti NSV Kunstifond, 1945.
- Eesti rahva elu-olu: 20 graafilist lehte, Tallinn, Eesti NSV Kunstifond, 1945.
- Mit L. Medvedeva: Nõukogude maal ja graafika näituse juht, Tallinn, 1945.
- Eesti kunsti materjale bibliograafilisi materjale, 16 Bände, Tallinn, 1935–1948
- Vana Tallinn ajaloolistes mälestusmärkides, Tallinn, Ilukirjandus ja Kunst, 1948.
- Katalog zur Ausstellung Kunstnik Roman Nymani teoste, Tallinn, Riiklik Kunstimuuseum, 1948.
- Vene Realistik Maalikool – Peredviznikud, NSVL Kunstifondi vabariiklik osakond, Tallinn, 1949.
- Eesti kunsti materjale. [4. osa], 12. [kd.] : Eesti tegelaste portreid kujutavas kunstis / koostanud Julius Genss, Tallinn : [s.n], 1950.
- Заметки библиофила часть 2, Tallinn, лето 1953.

== Literature ==
- Осоргин М. Библиофильская новинка, Последние новости (Париж), 1939, 1 июня;
- F. Puksoo Raamat ja tema sõbrad. Tallinn, 1973.
- Eesti kunsti sidemed XX saj. algupoolelt. Tallinn, 1978.
- Ласунский О.Г. (предисловие к публикации «Заметок библиофила»), Книга: Исследования и материалы. 1990. Сб.60; его же «Второе «я» Ю.Генса»
- Евреи в культуре Русского Зарубежья, Сост. М.Пархомовский. Иерусалим, 1993. Вып. 2
- Инна Генс-Катанян. Дома и миражи. Нижний Новгород, изд-во ДЕКОМ, 2005, ISBN 5-89533-147-5.
- Kodud ja kujutelmad, von Inna Gens, Tartu, Atlex, 2007, ISBN 978-9949-441-04-4.
- Lepik Hanno: Julius Genss ja ekslibristika. Tallinn, 2009.
- Leo Gens: J. Genss – Investigator and Propagator of Jewish art. Jerusalem, 1994.
- Mikhail Parkhomovsky: Russian-Jewish Diaspora (Historical Essays). Jerusalem, 2012, ISBN 978-965-90252-1-3.
- Eerik Teder: "Julius Genss and bibliophiilia. Raamat on… II, Tallinn 2002 (in Estnisch)
- Jutta Fleckenstein: Von ganz weit weg – Einwanderer aus der ehemaligen Sowjetunion, Hentrich und Hentrich Verlag Berlin, 2012, ISBN 978-3-942271-71-4.

== See also ==
- Nazi plunder
- University of Tartu
- The Holocaust in Estonia
