= Kalevi-Liiva =

Sand dunes and Nazi execution site in Estonia

Coordinates: 59°28′49.38″N 25°14′59.44″E

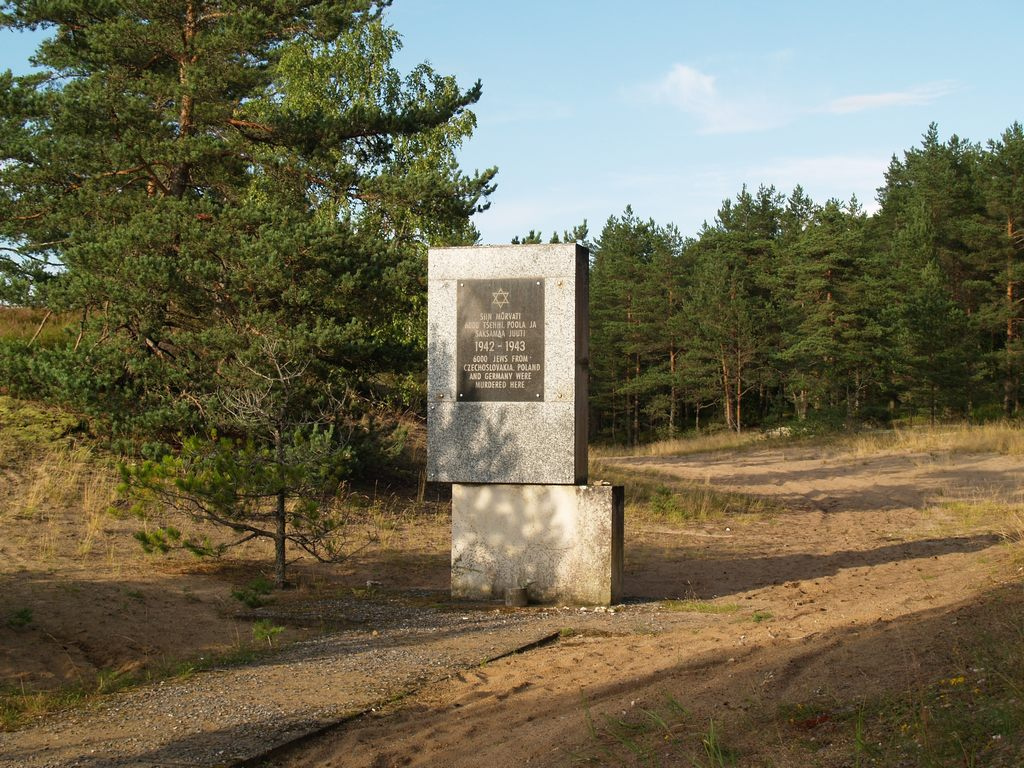
Memorial in Kalevi-Liiva

Kalevi-Liiva are sand dunes in Jõelähtme Parish in Harju County, Estonia. The site is located near the Baltic coast, north of the Jägala village and the former Jägala concentration camp. It is best known as the execution site of at least 6,000 Jewish and Roma Holocaust victims.

== Execution site ==
The Kalevi-Liiva site served as the execution and burial site for trainloads of Central European Jews transported to Estonia for extermination. Other victims include Gypsies and political prisoners of mainly Estonian and Russian origin.

The mass executions were carried out by Estonian Nazi collaborators under German supervision. At least two trainloads of Jews arrived at the Raasiku railway station, one from Theresienstadt Ghetto on September 5, 1942, and another from Germany in mid-September. The trains carried over 2,000 people, mainly German and Czechoslovak Jews, about 450 of whom were selected for forced labor and interned at the Jägala concentration camp, the rest were transferred by bus to Kalevi-Liiva and immediately executed.

The Estonians in charge of the executions, Aleksander Laak, Ain-Ervin Mere and Ralf Gerrets, were implicated in the Holocaust trials in Soviet Estonia in 1961 and charged with murdering up to 5,000 German and Czechoslovak Jews and Gypsies in 1942–1943.

Estimates of the total number of victims vary. The two memorial stones on the site cite 6,000 Jews and 2,000 Roma. Contemporary sources estimate at least 1,700 (probably 1,754) Jews killed at Kalevi-Liiva, other known victims include forty Romani people and a number of "political prisoners" of mainly Estonian and Russian origin.

== See also ==
- Holocaust trials in Soviet Estonia
- History of the Jews in Estonia
- Judenfrei
