= History of the Jews in Estonia =

Estonian Jews Eesti juudid יהודים אסטונים
Total population
- 2,013

Languages
- Estonian, Hebrew, Russian, and Yiddish

Religion
- Judaism

Related ethnic groups
- Other Ashkenazi Jews; Russian Jews, Finnish Jews, Lithuanian Jews, Latvian Jews, Polish Jews

The location of Estonia (dark green) in Europe

The history of Jews in Estonia starts with reports of the presence of individual Jews in what is now Estonia from as early as the 14th century.

Jews were settled in Estonia in the 19th century, especially following a statute of Russian Tsar Alexander II in 1865 allowed the so-called Jewish "Nicholas soldiers" (often former cantonists) and their descendants, First Guild merchants, artisans, and Jews with higher education to settle outside the Pale of Settlement. These settlers founded the first Jewish congregations in Estonia. The Tallinn congregation, the largest in Estonia, was founded in 1830. The Tartu congregation was established in 1866 when the first fifty families settled there. Synagogues were built, the largest of which were constructed in Tallinn in 1883 and Tartu in 1901. Both of these were destroyed by fire during World War II. A synagogue was also built in Võru as shown in the records of Estonian Jewish historian Nathan Ganns.

The Jewish population spread to other Estonian cities where houses of prayer (at Valga, Pärnu and Viljandi) were erected and cemeteries were established. Schools were opened to teach Talmud, and elementary schools were organised in Tallinn in the 1880s. The majority of Jews at that time consisted of small tradesmen and artisans without advanced schooling because the settlement consisted of demobilized Cantonists, who had been drafted into the Russian army at an early age. At the end of the 19th century, however, several Jews entered the University of Tartu and later contributed significantly to enliven Jewish culture and education. Among the Jewish residents of Võro who graduated from the University of Tartu was Moses Wolf Goldberg. In 1917 the Jewish Drama Club was founded in Tartu.

== Jewish autonomy in independent Estonia ==
Approximately 200 Jews fought in combat in the Estonian War of Independence (1918–1920) for the creation of the Republic of Estonia. 70 of these fighters were volunteers.

The creation of the Republic of Estonia in 1918 marked the beginning of a new era in the life of Jews. From the independence of Estonia as a state, Estonia showed tolerance towards all ethnic and religious minorities. This set the stage for energetic growth in the political and cultural activities of Jewish society. Between 11 and 16 May 1919, the first Estonian Congress of Jewish congregations was convened to discuss the new circumstances Jewish life was confronting. This is where the ideas of cultural autonomy and a Jewish Gymnasium (secondary school) in Tallinn were born. Jewish societies and associations began to grow in numbers. The largest of these new societies was the H. N. Bjalik Literature and Drama Society in Tallinn founded in 1918. Societies and clubs were established in Viljandi, Narva, and elsewhere.

=== 1920s ===
In 1920, the Maccabi Sports Society was founded and became well known for its endeavours to encourage sports among Jews. Jews also took an active part in sporting events in Estonia and abroad. Sara Teitelbaum was a 17-time champion in Estonian athletics and established no fewer than 28 records. In the 1930s there were about 100 Jews studying at the University of Tartu: 44 studied jurisprudence and 18 medicine. In 1934, a chair was established in the School of Philosophy for the study of Judaica. There were five Jewish student societies in Tartu Academic Society: the Women's Student Society Hazfiro, the Corporation Limuvia, the Society Hasmonea and the Endowment for Jewish Students. All of these had their own libraries and played important roles in Jewish culture and social life.

Political organisations such as Zionist youth organisations Hashomer Hazair and Beitar were also established. Many Jewish youths travelled to Palestine to establish the Jewish State. The kibbutzim of Kfar Blum and Ein Gev were set up in part by Estonian Jews.

On 12 February 1925, the Estonian government passed a law on the cultural autonomy of minorities. The Jewish community quickly prepared its application for cultural autonomy. Statistics on Jewish citizens were compiled. They totalled 3,045, fulfilling the minimum requirement of 3,000 for cultural autonomy. In June 1926 the Jewish Cultural Council was elected and Jewish cultural autonomy was declared. The administrative organ of this autonomy was the Board of Jewish Culture, headed by Hirsch Aisenstadt until it was disbanded following the Soviet occupation of Estonia in 1940. When German troops occupied Estonia in 1941, Aisenstadt evacuated to Russia. He returned to Estonia when the Germans had left but was arrested by the Soviet authorities in 1949.

The cultural autonomy of minority peoples is an exceptional phenomenon in European cultural history. Therefore, Jewish cultural autonomy was of great interest to the global Jewish community. The Jewish National Endowment Keren Kajamet presented the Estonian government with a certificate of gratitude for this achievement.

This cultural autonomy allowed full control of education by the community. From 1926, Hebrew began to replace Russian in the Jewish public school in Tallinn, while in 1928 a rival Yiddish language school was founded.

From the very first days of its existence as a state, Estonia showed tolerance towards all the peoples inhabiting its territories. In 1925, the Act of Cultural Autonomy for Ethnic Minorities was enacted in Estonia, giving minority groups consisting of at least 3,000 individuals the right to self-determination in cultural matters. Financial support was provided by the state. Thus, in 1926, Jewish cultural autonomy was declared. For its tolerant policy towards Jews, a page was dedicated to the Republic of Estonia in the Golden Book of Jerusalem in 1927.

=== 1930s ===
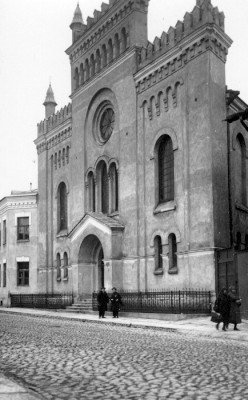
Tallinn Synagogue, built in 1885, destroyed by Soviet bombing of Tallinn in March 1944

In 1934, there were 4381 Jews living in Estonia (0.4% of the population). 2203 Jews lived in Tallinn. Other cities of residence included Tartu (920), Valga (262), Pärnu (248), Narva (188) and Viljandi (121). 1688 Jews contributed to the national economy: 31% in commerce, 24% in services, 14.5% as artisans, and 14% as labourers. There were also large businesses: the leather factory Uzvanski and Sons in Tartu, the Ginovkeris' Candy Factory in Tallinn, furriers Ratner and Hoff, and forest improvement companies such as Seins and Judeiniks. There was a society for tradesmen and industrialists. Tallinn and Tartu boasted Jewish co-operative banks. Only 9.5% of the Jewish population worked freelance. Most of these were physicians, over 80 in all (there was also a society for Jewish physicians). In addition there were 16 pharmacists and 4 veterinarians. 11% of the Jewish population had received higher education, 37% secondary education and 33% elementary education. 18% had only received education at home.

The Jewish community established its own social welfare system. The Jewish Goodwill Society of the Tallinn Congregation made it their business to oversee and execute the ambitions of this system. The Rabbi of Tallinn at that time was Dr. Gomer. In 1941 during the German occupation he was ruthlessly harassed and finally murdered. In Tartu the Jewish Assistance Union was active, and welfare units were set up in Narva, Valga and Pärnu.

In 1933 the influence of National Socialism on Baltic Germans began to be a concern. Nazism was outlawed as a movement contrary to social order, the German Cultural Council was disbanded, and the National Socialist Viktor von Mühlen, the elected member of the Baltic German Party, was forced to resign from the Riigikogu. All materials ridiculing Jews, including the National Socialist magazine Valvur (Guard) were banned by order of the State Elder Konstantin Päts as materials inciting hatred.

In the same year a faculty of Jewish Studies was established at Tartu University. Lazar Gulkowitsch, a former professor at Leipzig University was appointed the university's first Professor and Chair of Jewish Studies and began teaching in 1934.

In 1936, the British-based newspaper The Jewish Chronicle reported after a visit to Tallinn by one of its journalists:

"Estonia is the only country in Eastern Europe where neither the Government nor the people practice any discrimination against Jews and where Jews are left in peace.... the cultural autonomy granted to Estonian Jews ten years ago still holds good, and Jews are allowed to lead a free and unmolested life and fashion it in accord with their national and cultural principles."

In February 1937, as anti-semitism was growing elsewhere in Europe, the vice president of the Jewish Community Heinrich Gutkin was appointed by Presidential decree to the Estonian upper parliamentary chamber, the Riiginõukogu.

Throughout the 1930s, Zionist youth movements were active, with pioneer training being offered on Estonian farms by HeHalutz, while the leading cultural institute Bialik Farein performed plays and its choir toured and performed on radio.

== World War II ==
=== Soviet occupation 1940–1941 and the Red Terror ===
The life of the small Jewish community in Estonia was disrupted in 1940 with the Soviet occupation of Estonia. Cultural autonomy together with all its institutions were liquidated in July 1940. In July and August of the same year all organisations, associations, societies and corporations were closed. Jewish businesses were nationalized. A relatively large number of Jews (350–450, about 10% of the total Jewish population) were deported into forced labour camps of GULAG in Russia by the Soviet authorities on 14 June 1941, where most perished.

=== German occupation 1941–1944 and The Holocaust ===
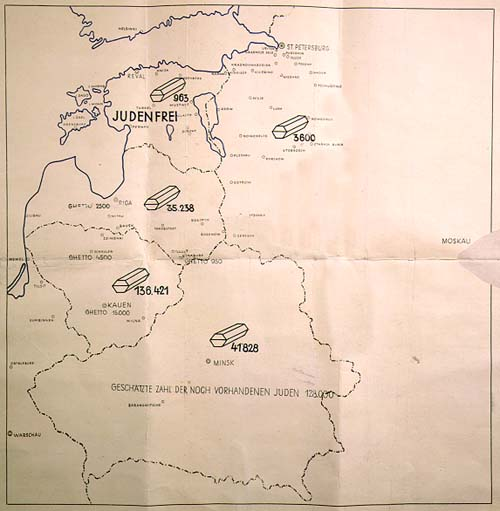
German map showing the number of Jewish executions carried out by Einsatzgruppe A. * Estonia 963 executions and declared "Judenfrei" * Latvia 35,238 executions * Lithuania 136,421 executions * Belarus 41,828 executions * Russia 3,600 executions * at the bottom: "the estimated number of Jews still on hand is 128,000"

More than 75% of Estonia's Jewish community, aware of the fate that otherwise awaited them, managed to escape to the Soviet Union; virtually all the remainder (between 950 and 1000 men, women, and children) had been killed by the end of 1941. They included Estonia's only Rabbi; the professor of Jewish Studies at the University of Tartu; Jews who had left the Jewish community; the mentally disabled; and a number of veterans of the Estonian War of Independence. Fewer than a dozen Estonian Jews are known to have survived the war in Estonia.

Round-ups and killings of Jews began immediately following the arrival of the first German troops in 1941, who were closely followed by the extermination squad Sonderkommando 1a under Martin Sandberger, part of Einsatzgruppe A led by Walter Stahlecker. Arrests and executions continued as the Germans, with the assistance of local collaborators, advanced through Estonia. Unlike German forces, Estonians seem to have supported the anti-Jewish actions on the political level, but not on a racial basis. The standard excuse used for the "cleansing" operations was arrest "because of Communist activity". This equation of Jews with Communism evoked a positive Estonian response, and attempts were made by Estonian police to determine whether an arrested person indeed supported Communism. Estonians often argued that their Jewish colleagues and friends were not communists and submitted proof of pro-Estonian conduct in the hope of being able to get them released. Estonia was declared Judenfrei quite early, at the Wannsee Conference on 20 January 1942, as the Jewish population of Estonia was small (about 4,500), and the majority of it managed to escape to the Soviet Union before the Germans arrived. Virtually all the remainder (921 according to Martin Sandberger, 929 according to Evgenia Goorin-Loov and 963 according to Walter Stahlecker) were killed. The Nazi regime also established 22 concentration and labor camps in Estonia for foreign Jews, the largest being Vaivara concentration camp. Several thousand foreign Jews were killed at the Kalevi-Liiva camp. An estimated 10,000 Jews were killed in Estonia after having been deported there from Eastern Europe.

There were two Estonians who have been honoured with The Righteous Among the Nations: Uku Masing and his wife Eha.

=== Soviet re-occupation 1944–1991 ===
Four Estonians held most responsible for the murders at Kalevi-Liiva were tried at war crimes trials in 1961. Two were later executed, while the others avoided sentencing by going into exile.

About 1,500 Jews from Tallinn returned after the war, and by 1959 there were 3,714 Jews in the city. After the Six-Day War, 400 Jews from Tallinn emigrated to Israel. From 1944 to 1988, there were no Jewish organisations, associations, or clubs in Estonia.

== Current situation ==
Tallinn Synagogue

During the Singing Revolution in Estonia creation of civic organizations gained momentum. In March 1988, the Jewish Cultural Society was established in Tallinn, the first of its kind in the Soviet Union. Unlike in other parts of the Soviet Union, there were no problems with registering the society or its symbols. The Society began by organising concerts and lectures. Soon the question of founding a Jewish school arose. As a start, a Sunday school was established in 1989. The Tallinn Jewish Gymnasium on Karu Street was being used by a vocational school. In 1990, a Jewish school with grades 1 through 9 was established.

Jewish culture clubs, affiliated with the Cultural Society, started in Tartu, Narva, and Kohtla-Järve. Other organisations followed: the sports society Maccabi, the Society for the Gurini Goodwill Endowment and the Jewish Veterans Union. Life returned to Jewish congregations. Courses in Hebrew were re-established. A relatively large library was opened with assistance from Israeli and Jewish communities in other countries.

The gamut of cultural activities kept on growing. The Jewish Cultural Society is a founding member of Eestimaa Rahvuste Ühendus (Union of the Peoples of Estonia), which was founded at the end of 1988. The restoration of Estonian independence in 1991 brought about numerous political, economic and social changes. The Jews living in Estonia could now defend their rights as a national minority. The Jewish community was officially recognized with the approval of its charter on 11 April 1992. Estonia resumed its traditional regard of its Jews with friendship and accommodation. In support of this a new Cultural Autonomy Act, based on the original 1925 law, was passed in Estonia in October 1993, which grants minority communities, including Jewish, a legal guarantee to preserve their national identities.

In 2005 the name of a park in Võru was changed to the "Jewish park" as it abutted the factory of a cantonist Jewish family, the Judaikens, who had established residence there after service in the army of Alexander II of Russia. In 1875 the Judaiken family built a synagogue in Võru in the vicinity of the park.

On 16 May 2007 a new synagogue in Tallinn was opened. It houses a sanctuary, mikvah and restaurant. A year later, in 2008, the Estonian Jewish Museum opened to the public.

In 2018, an unknown group of perpetrators torched and vandalized Holocaust monuments in Estonia. In 2019, one year later, the Jewish section of the Rahumäe Cemetery in Tallinn was vandalized; vandals broke graves and defaced them with swastikas.

== Historical demographics ==
Estonia always had a relatively small Jewish population. In 1820 there were 36 Jewish residents listed as living in Estonia. By 1918 the number had increased to 1,523. In 1922, there were 1,929 Jewish residents. In 1934 there were 4,389 Jewish residents. In contrast to many other European countries, Estonia's Jewish population peaked only after World War II, at almost 5,500 people in 1959. It then began a steady decline, with an especially sharp decline in the 1990s after the fall of Communism as many Estonian Jews emigrated to other countries, especially to Israel and the United States. The following places are known to have cemeteries with Jewish graves in Estonia: Narva; Pärnu; Rakvere; Tallinn (Magasini Jewish cemetery, and Rahumäe Jewish cemetery); Tartu (Old Jewish cemetery, New Jewish cemetery, Roosi Street cemetery); Valga; Viljandi and Võru.

Historical Estonian Jewish population
Year	Pop.	±%
1881	3,290	—
1897	3,837	+16.6%
1922	4,566	+19.0%
1934	4,434	−2.9%
1959	5,439	+22.7%
1970	5,290	−2.7%
1979	4,993	−5.6%
1989	4,653	−6.8%
2004	2,003	−57.0%
2012	1,738	−13.2%
2022	1,852	+6.6%
Source: *: The Jewish population data includes Mountain Jews, Georgian Jews, Bukharan Jews (or Central Asian Jews), Krymchaks (all per the 1959 Soviet census), and Tats.

== Current demographics ==
- Total population (2007): 1,900
- Live births (2006): 12
- Total deaths (2006): 51
- Birth rate: 6.32 per 1000
- Death rate: 26.84 per 1000
- Net growth rate: −2.05% per year.

== See also ==
- List of Estonian Jews
- Tallinn Synagogue
- Tartu Synagogue
- History of the Jews during World War II
- Judenfrei
- Klooga concentration camp
- Occupation of Estonia by Nazi Germany
- Reichskommissariat Ostland
- History of the Jews in Latvia
- History of the Jews in Lithuania
