= Ain-Ervin Mere =

Estonian military personnel

Ain Mere
- Born: 22 February 1903; Vändra, Governorate of Livonia, Russian Empire
- Died: 5 April 1969 (aged 66); Leicester, England
- Status: Deceased
- Convictions: Treason; War crimes
- Penalty: Death (in absentia)
- Military career
- Allegiance: Estonia; Soviet Union; Nazi Germany
- Service years: 1918–1940 Estonian Army; 1940-1941 NKVD; 1941–1943 Omakaitse; Estonian Security Police and SD; 1943–1945 Waffen-SS
- Rank: SS-Obersturmbannführer
- Unit: 20th Waffen Grenadier Division of the SS
- Conflicts: Estonian War of Independence; World War II; Eastern Front
- Awards: Order of the Cross of the Eagle; Iron Cross 1st Class

Ain Mere (from birth to Estification Ervin Martson; 22 February 1903 – 5 April 1969) was an Estonian military officer in World War II. During the German occupation of Estonia, he served in the German-controlled Estonian Security Police and SD.

== Career ==
He was born in Vändra and fought voluntarily in the Estonian War of Independence. In early 1919, Mere was wounded while serving on an armored train and was sent to the rear.

According to the KGB archives, he was drafted as an agent of NKVD in 1940–1941. Mere's reports on the resettlement of Baltic Germans and the exposure of underground Estonian organisations reached the desk of Lavrenti Beria. In recognition of his performance Mere was appointed the director of a special department of the Estonian Rifle Corps. He was known under code name "Müller". In July 1941 Mere surrendered himself to the German military. He was a member of the Estonian Security Police (Group B of the Sicherheitspolizei) under the Estonian Self-Administration and participated in the Holocaust.

On 5 February 1945, in Berlin, he founded the Eesti Vabadusliit, an anti-communist group, together with fellow Waffen-SS commander Harald Riipalu.

== Trial in absentia ==
In March 1961, during the war crimes trials in Soviet Estonia, the German Security Police in Estonia, headed by Mere (and later by Julius Ennok), along with Ralf Gerrets and Jaan Viik, was accused in a Soviet court to have been actively involved in the arrest and killing of Estonian Jews. The police were also actively engaged in actions against Estonians deemed to be opponents of Nazi Germany. Though at the time he was residing in Britain, Mere was sentenced to death for his role during the war. The British government refused to extradite him, citing a lack of evidence on the part of the Soviet authorities, and he died at the age of 66 in Leicester, England.
