= Soviet deportations from Estonia =

A series of mass deportations from Soviet-occupied Estonia was carried out in 1941 and 1945–1953 by Joseph Stalin's government. The two largest waves of deportations occurred in June 1941 and March 1949 simultaneously in all three occupied Baltic countries: Estonia, Latvia, and Lithuania. In addition, there were Soviet deportations from Estonia based on the victims' ethnicity (Germans in 1945 and Ingrian Finns in 1947–1950) and religion (Jehovah's Witnesses in 1951). Ethnic Estonians who had been residing in Soviet Russia (mostly in the Leningrad Oblast) had already been subjected to deportation since 1935.

People were deported to remote areas of the Soviet Union, predominantly to Siberia and northern Kazakhstan, by means of railroad cattle cars. Entire families, including children and the elderly, were deported without trial or prior announcement. Of March 1949 deportees, over 70% of people were women and children under the age of 16.

In total, over 35,000 of "enemies of the people", individual persons and whole families, were deported during 1945-1953, of which 33,000 were deported during the March deportation of 1949 (Operation Priboi). Their names were compiled into lists by the Memento Estonian Repressed Persons' Records Bureau.

The Estonian Internal Security Service has brought to justice several organizers of these events. The deportations have been repeatedly declared to constitute a crime against humanity by the Parliament of Estonia and acknowledged as such by the European Court of Human Rights.

== June deportation of 1941 ==
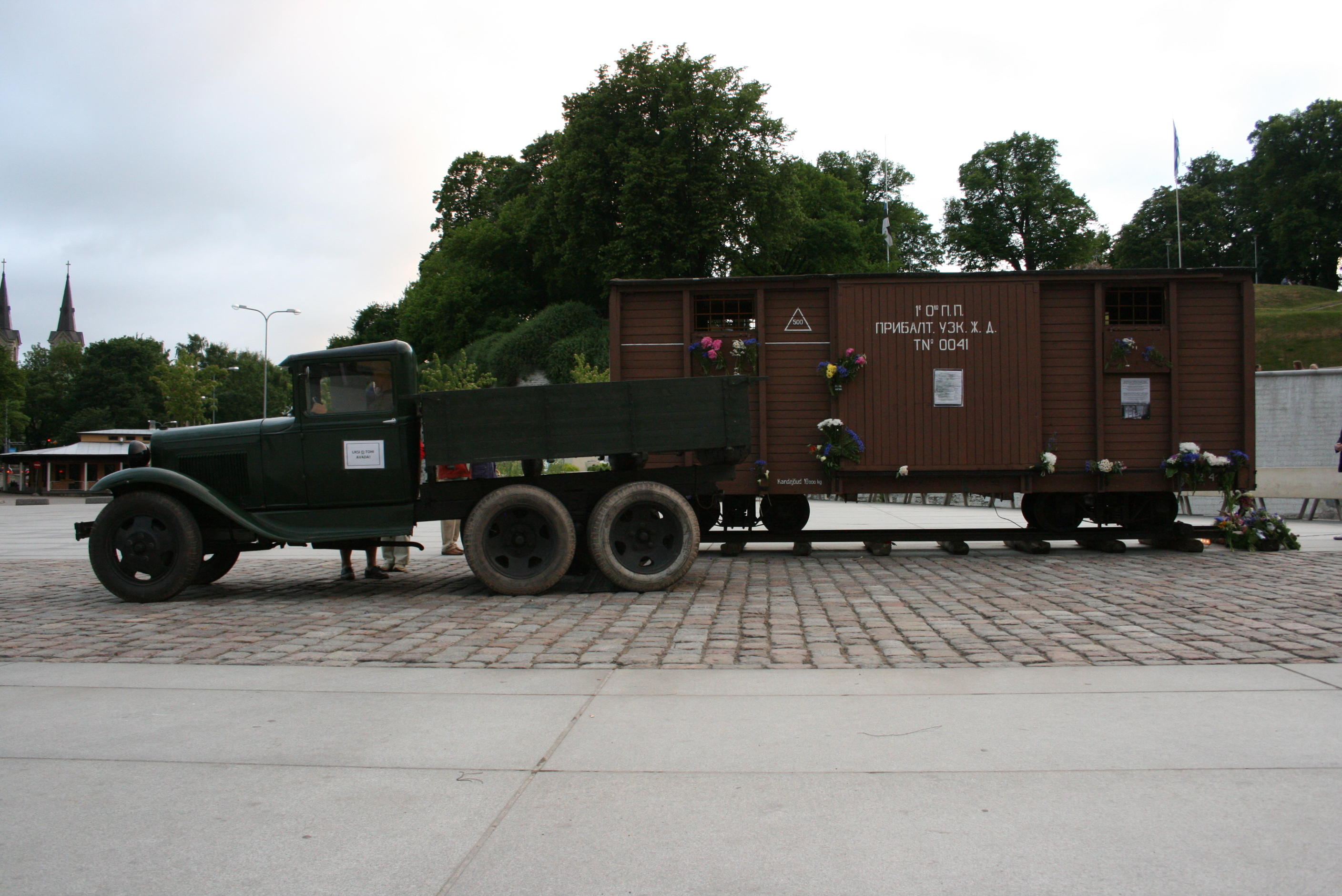
Exhibition of vehicles similar to these that were used for deporting people to Siberia in 1941.

In Estonia, as well as in other territories annexed by the Soviet Union in 1939–40, the first large-scale deportation of ordinary citizens was carried out by the local operational headquarters of the NKGB of the Estonian SSR under Boris Kumm (chairman), Andres Murro, Aleksei Shkurin, Veniamin Gulst, and Rudolf James, according to the top secret joint decree No 1299-526ss Directive on the Deportation of the Socially Alien Element from the Baltic Republics, Western Ukraine, Western Belarus and Moldavia by the Central Committee of the All-Union Communist Party (bolsheviks) and the Council of People's Commissars of the Soviet Union of 14 May 1941. The deportation procedure was established by the Serov Instructions.

The first repressions in Estonia affected Estonia's national elite. On 17 July 1940, Commander in Chief of the Armed Forces Johan Laidoner (died 1953, Vladimir prison) and his family, and on 30 July 1940, President Konstantin Päts (died 1956, Kalinin Oblast) and his family were deported to Penza and Ufa, respectively. In 1941 they were arrested. The country's political and military leadership was deported almost entirely, including 10 of 11 ministers and 68 of 120 members of parliament.

On 14 June 1941, and the following two days, 9,254 to 10,861 people, mostly urban residents, of them over 5,000 women and over 2,500 children under 16, 439 Jews (more than 10% of the Estonian Jewish population) were deported, mostly to Kirov Oblast, Novosibirsk Oblast or to prisons.

Only 4,331 persons returned to Estonia. 11,102 people were to be deported from Estonia according to the order of 13 June but some managed to escape. Identical deportations were carried out in Latvia and Lithuania at the same time. A few weeks later, approximately 1,000 people were arrested on Saaremaa for deportation, but this was interrupted as Nazi Germany launched a large-scale invasion of the Soviet Union and a considerable number of the prisoners were freed by the advancing German forces.

The first wave of deportation has always been well documented, as many witnesses were subsequently able to flee abroad during the Second World War. Deportations after 1944 were, however, much harder to document.

In July 1941 Estonia was conquered by Nazi Germany, who were forced out by the Soviet troops in 1944. As soon as the Soviets had returned the deportations resumed. In August 1945, 407 persons, most of them of German descent, were transferred from Estonia to Perm Oblast. 18 families (51 persons) were transferred to Tyumen Oblast in October (51 persons), 37 families (87 persons) in November and other 37 families (91 persons) in December 1945 as "traitors".

== March deportation of 1949 ==
During the collectivization period in the Baltic republics, on 29 January 1949, the Council of Ministers issued top secret decree No. 390–138ss, which obligated the Ministry for State Security (MGB) to exile the kulaks and the people's enemies from the three Baltic Republics forever.

In the early morning of 25 March 1949, the second major wave of deportation from the Baltic Republics, operation "Priboi", carried out by MGB began, which was planned to affect 30,000 in Estonia, including peasants. Lieutenant General Pyotr Burmak, commander of the MGB Internal Troops, was in generally charge for the operation. In Estonia the deportations were coordinated by Boris Kumm, Minister of Security of the Estonian SSR, and Major General Ivan Yermolin, MGB representative to Estonia. Over 8,000 managed to escape, but 20,722 (7,500 families, over 2.5 percent of the Estonian population, half of them women, over 6,000 children under the age of 16, and 4,300 men) were sent to Siberia during three days. Slightly more than 10 percent were men of working age. The deported included disabled people, pregnant women, newborns and children separated from their parents. The youngest deportee was one-day-old Virve Eliste from Hiiumaa island, who died a year later in Siberia; the oldest was 95-year-old Maria Raagel. Nine trainloads of people were directed to Novosibirsk Oblast, six to Krasnoyarsk Krai, two to Omsk Oblast, and two to Irkutsk Oblast.

Many perished, most have never returned home. This second wave of the large-scale deportations was aimed to facilitate collectivization, which was implemented with great difficulties in the Baltic republics. As a result, by the end of April 1949, half of the remaining individual farmers in Estonia had joined kolkhozes.

From 1948–50, a number of Ingrian Finns were also deported from Estonian SSR. The last large-scale campaign of deportations from Estonia took place in 1951, when members of prohibited religious groups from the Baltic countries, Moldavia, Western Ukraine and Belarus were subject to forced resettlement.

== Continuous deportation ==
Outside the main waves, individuals and families were continually deported on smaller scale from the start of the first occupation in 1940 up to the Khrushchev Thaw of 1956. The Soviet deportations only stopped for three years in 1941–1944 when Estonia was occupied by Nazi Germany.

Estonians' experience with the first year of Soviet occupation, which included the June deportation, led to two significant developments:

- It motivated a major wave of refugees leaving Estonia, mostly by ships over the Baltic Sea in late 1944, after the news about Nazi Germany's withdrawal became public. Some 70,000 people are known to have arrived in their destination; an unknown number perished due to the autumn storms and naval warfare.
- It incentivised many Estonians, who had previously been rather skeptical about joining German army (between January 1943 and February 1944, about 4000 people, mostly male, over half of them below 24 years old, i.e. draftable, had fled to Finland) to join the recently created foreign legions of Waffen-SS, to still try to keep Red Army off Estonian soil and thus, avoid a new Soviet occupation.

Only in 1956, during Khrushchev Thaw, were some survived deportees allowed to return to Estonia.

== Legal status ==
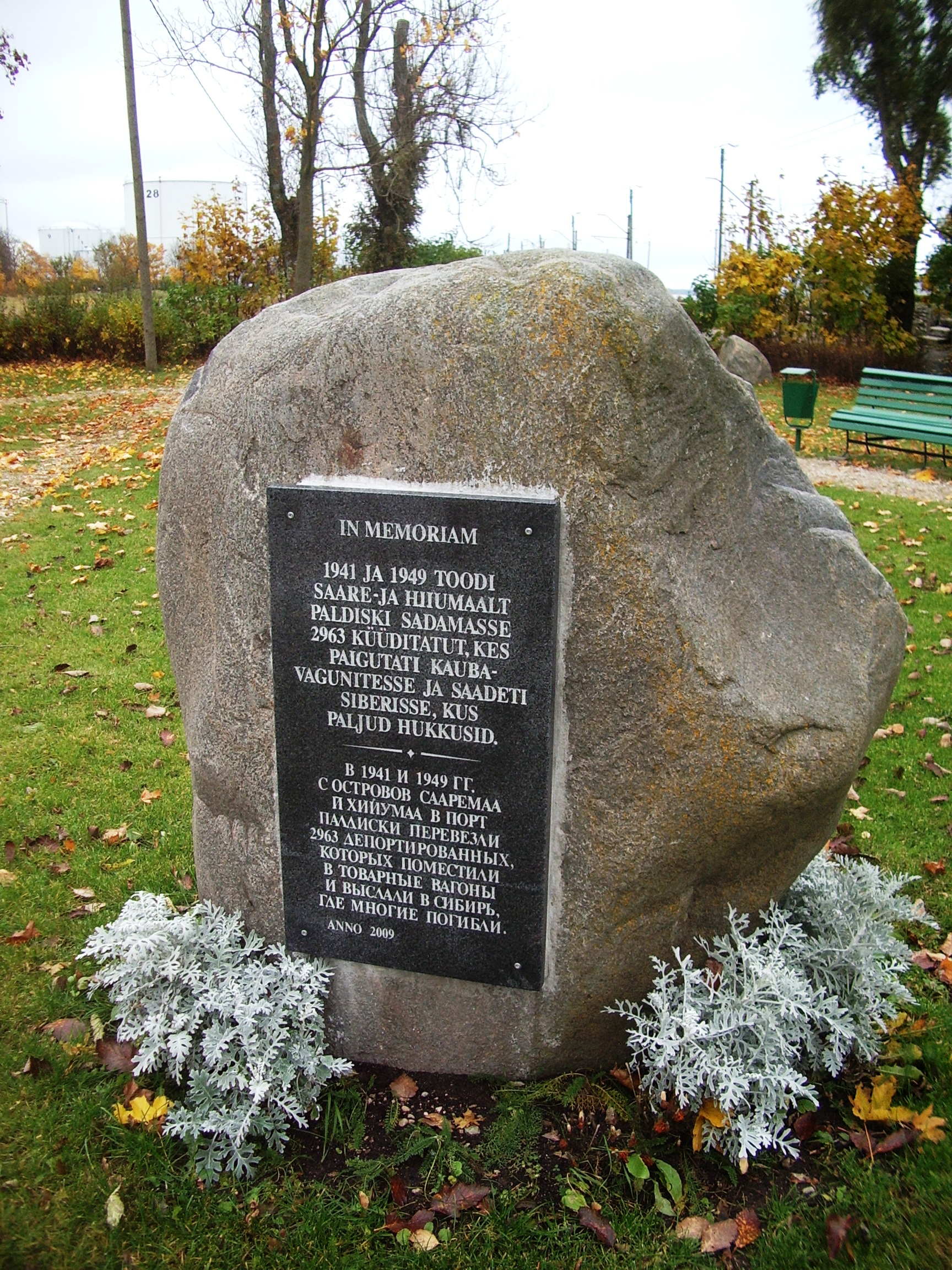
Memorial for the victims of deportations of 1941 and 1949 in Paldiski

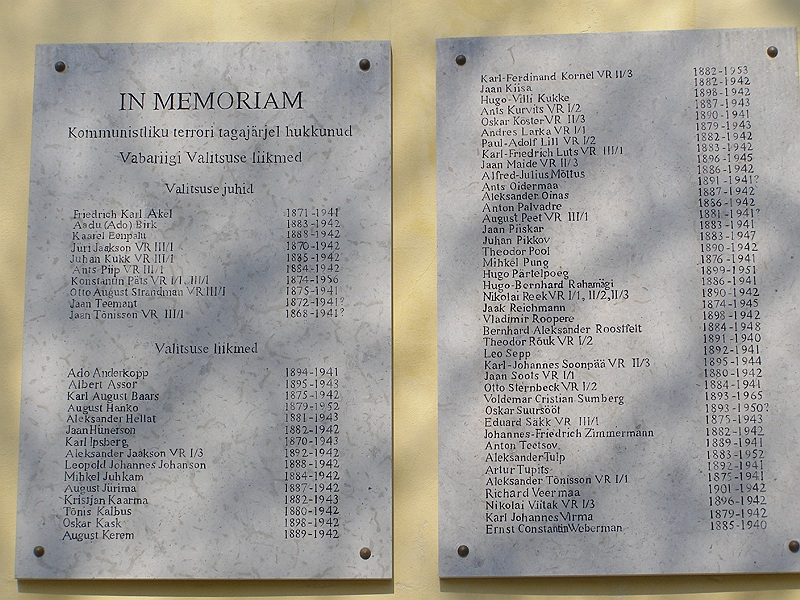
Plaque on Stenbock House, the building of Government of Estonia, Toompea, commemorating government members killed by communist terror

On 27 July 1950, diplomats-in-exile of Estonia, Latvia, and Lithuania appealed to the United States to support a United Nations investigation of "genocidal mass deportations" they said were being carried out in their countries by the Soviet Union.

=== Soviet acknowledgment of Stalin's deportations ===
Stalin's deportation of peoples was criticized in the closed section of Nikita Khrushchev's 1956 Report to the 20th Congress of the Communist Party of the Soviet Union as "monstrous acts" and "rude violations of the basic Leninist principles of the nationality policy of the Soviet state."

On 14 November 1989, the Supreme Soviet of the USSR accepted declaration "On the Recognition as Unlawful and Criminal The Repressive Acts Against Peoples Who Were Subjected to Forced Resettlement, and On Guaranteeing Their Rights", in which it condemned Stalin's deportation of peoples as the terrific felony, guaranteed that such violations of human rights won't be repeated and promised to restore the rights of repressed Soviet peoples.

=== Estonian trials and convictions ===
In 1995, after the re-establishment of Estonian independence, Riigikogu, the parliament of independent Estonia, declared the deportations officially a crime against humanity, and several organizers of the 1949 deportations, former officers of MGB, were convicted under Article 61-1 § 1 of the Criminal Code. The BBC noted in April 2009 that Estonia's claims of genocide are not widely accepted.

- Johannes Klaassepp (1921–2010), Vladimir Loginov (1924–2001) and Vasily Beskov were sentenced to eight years' probation in 1999.
- On 30 July 1999, Mikhail Neverovsky (born 1920) was sentenced to four years in prison.
- On 10 October 2003, August Kolk (born 1924) and Pyotr Kisly (born 1921) were sentenced to eight years in prison with three years of probation. The cases were taken to the European Court of Human Rights, the defendants alleging the sentencing was contrary to the prohibition of retroactive application of criminal laws, but the application was declared as "obviously baseless".
- On 30 October 2002, Yury Karpov received an eight-year suspended sentence.
- On 7 November 2006, Vladimir Kask was sentenced to eight years in prison with three years of probation.
- Arnold Meri was put on trial but died in April 2009 before the end of the trial.
- Charges against Nikolai Zerebtsovi were dropped.

=== Russia's view ===
The Russian Federation, the only legal successor state to the Soviet Union, has never recognized the deportations as a crime and has not paid any compensation. Moscow has criticized the Baltic prosecutions, calling them revenge, not justice, and complained about the criminals' age.

In March 2009, the Memorial society concluded that the deportations were a crime against humanity, but stopped short of declaring them genocide or war crimes. In the opinion of Memorial, interpretation of events in 1949 as genocide is not based upon international law and is unfounded.

== Investigative committee ==
The Estonian International Commission for Investigation of Crimes Against Humanity was established by President Lennart Meri, who himself was a survivor of the 1941 deportation, in October 1998 to investigate crimes against humanity committed in Estonia or against Estonian citizens during the Soviet and Nazi occupation. The commission held its first session in Tallinn in January 1999. Finnish diplomat Max Jakobson was appointed to chair the commission. For neutrality purposes, there are no Estonian citizens among its members.

== European Parliament ==
On 2 April 2009, The European Parliament issued a resolution condemning crimes against humanity committed by "all totalitarian and authoritarian regimes". The resolution underlines the millions of victims who were deported, imprisoned, tortured and murdered by totalitarian and authoritarian regimes during the 20th century in Europe. While not explicitly mentioned, this includes the Soviet deportations from Estonia, which the European Court of Human Rights has held to constitute crimes against humanity. The Parliament called for the proclamation of 23 August as Europe-wide Remembrance Day for the victims of all totalitarian and authoritarian regimes.

== See also ==
- Population transfer in the Soviet Union
- Broken Cornflower badge
- Birch bark letters from Siberia
