= German occupation of Estonia during World War II =

In the course of Operation Barbarossa, Nazi Germany invaded Estonia in July–December 1941, and occupied the country until 1944. Estonia had gained independence in 1918 from the then-warring German and Russian Empires. However, in the wake of the August 1939 Nazi-Soviet Pact, the Soviet Union had invaded and occupied Estonia in June 1940, and the country was formally annexed into the USSR in August 1940.

In the summer of 1941, the German troops were at first seen by most Estonians as liberators from Soviet terror, since the Germans arrived only a week after the mass deportation of tens of thousands of people from Estonia and other Baltic states. Despite high hopes for Estonian independence, the people soon realized that the Germans were just a different occupying power.

The German authorities exploited occupied Estonia for their war effort, and in 1941–1944 murdered tens of thousands of people (including indigenous ethnic Estonians, local Estonian Jews, Estonia's Romani people, Russians, Soviet prisoners of war, Jews from other countries, and others). For the duration of the occupation, Estonia was incorporated as Generalbezirk Estland, subordinated to the Reichskommissariat Ostland, an administrative subdivision of the German Reich.

== Military occupation ==
Nazi Germany invaded the Soviet Union on June 22, 1941. Three days later, on June 25, Finland declared herself to once again be at war with the USSR, starting the Continuation War. On July 3, Joseph Stalin made a public statement over the radio calling for scorched-earth policy in areas to be abandoned. Because the northernmost areas of the Baltic states were the last to be reached by the Germans, it was here that the Soviet destruction battalions had their most extreme effects. The Estonian Forest Brothers, numbering about 50,000, inflicted heavy casualties on the remaining Soviets; as many as 4,800 were killed and 14,000 captured.

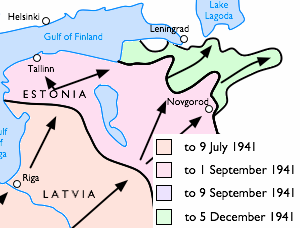
German advance in Latvia, Estonia and on the Leningrad front from June to December 1941

Even though the Germans did not cross the southern Estonian border until July 7–9, many Estonian deserters from Soviet units opened fire on the Red Army as early as June 22. On that day, a group of Forest Brothers attacked Soviet trucks in the district of Harju. The Soviet 22nd Rifle Corps lost the most men, as a large group of Estonian soldiers and officers deserted from it. Furthermore, the border guards of Soviet Estonia mostly had fought for an independent Estonia, and they also escaped to the forests, becoming some of the best Estonian fighters. Estonian writer Juhan Jaik wrote in 1941: "These days bogs and forests are more populated than farms and fields. The forests and bogs are our territory while the fields and farms are occupied by the enemy [i.e., the Soviets]".

The 8th Army (Major General Ljubovtsev), retreated in front of the 2nd corps of the German Army behind the Pärnu River to Emajõgi river line on July 12. As German troops approached Tartu on July 10 and prepared for another battle with the Soviets, they realized that Estonian partisans were already fighting the Soviet troops. The Wehrmacht stopped its advance and hung back, leaving the Estonians to do the fighting. The battle of Tartu lasted two weeks, and destroyed most of the city. Under the leadership of Friedrich Kurg, the Estonian partisans drove the Soviets from Tartu on their own. In the meanwhile, the Soviets had been murdering citizens held in Tartu Prison, killing 192 before the Estonians captured the city.

At the end of July the Germans resumed their advance in Estonia, working with the Estonian Forest Brothers. Both German troops and Estonian partisans took Narva on August 17 and the Estonian capital Tallinn on August 28. On that day, the Soviet flag shot down earlier on Pikk Hermann was replaced with the flag of Estonia by Fred Ise. After the Soviets were driven from Estonia, German troops disarmed all partisan groups. The Estonian flag was soon replaced with the German one, and the 2,000 Estonian soldiers who took part in the parade in Tartu on July 29, were disbanded.

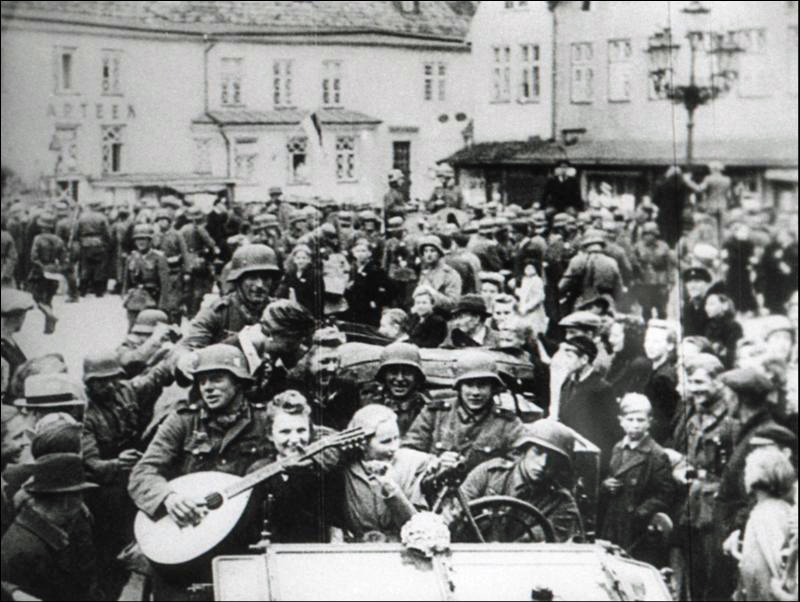
Estonians greeted German soldiers as liberators in Tallinn

Most Estonians greeted the Germans with relatively open arms and hoped for the restoration of independence. Estonia set up an administration, led by Jüri Uluots as soon as the Soviet regime retreated and before German troops arrived. Estonian partisans that drove the Red Army from Tartu made it possible. That all was for nothing since the Germans had made their plans as set out in Generalplan Ost, they disbanded the provisional government and the territory of Estonia was organized as Generalbezirk Estland, subordinated to the Reichskommissariat Ostland, an administrative subdivision of Nazi Germany. A Sicherheitspolizei was established for internal security under the leadership of Ain-Ervin Mere.

In April 1941, on the eve on the German invasion, Alfred Rosenberg, Reich minister for the Occupied Eastern territories, a Baltic German, born and raised in Tallinn, Estonia, laid out his plans for the East. According to Rosenberg a future policy was created:

1. Germanization (Eindeutschung) of the "racially suitable" elements.
2. Colonization by Germanic people.
3. Exile, deportations of undesirable elements.

Rosenberg felt that the "Estonians were the most Germanic out of the people living in the Baltic area, having already reached 50 percent of Germanization through Danish, Swedish and German influence". Non-suitable Estonians were to be moved to a region that Rosenberg called "Peipusland" to make room for German colonists. The removal of 50% of Estonians was in accordance with the Nazi Generalplan Ost.

The initial enthusiasm that accompanied the liberation from Soviet occupation quickly waned as a result and the Germans had limited success in recruiting volunteers. The draft was introduced in 1942, resulting in some 3400 men fleeing to Finland to fight in the Finnish Army rather than join the Germans. Finnish Infantry Regiment 200 (Estonian: soomepoisid 'boys of Finland') was formed out of Estonian volunteers in Finland.

With the Allied victory over Germany becoming certain in 1944, the only option to save Estonia's independence was to stave off a new Soviet invasion of Estonia until Germany's capitulation.

== Political resistance ==
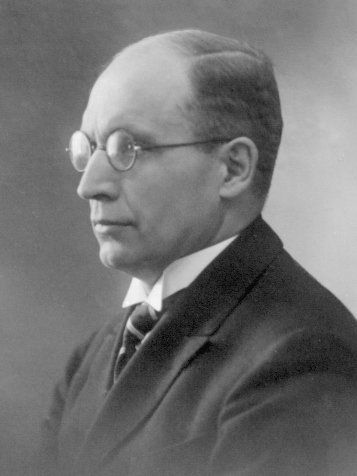
Jüri Uluots

In June 1942 political leaders of Estonia who had survived Soviet repressions held a hidden meeting from the occupying powers in Estonia where the formation of an underground Estonian government and the options for preserving continuity of the republic were discussed.

On January 6, 1943 a meeting was held at the Estonian foreign delegation in Stockholm. It was decided that, in order to preserve the legal continuity of the Republic of Estonia, the last constitutional prime minister, Jüri Uluots, must continue to fulfill his responsibilities as prime minister.

In June 1944 the elector's assembly of the Republic of Estonia gathered in secrecy from the occupying powers in Tallinn and appointed Jüri Uluots as the prime minister with the responsibilities of the President. On June 21 Jüri Uluots appointed Otto Tief as deputy prime minister.

As the Germans retreated, on September 18, 1944 Jüri Uluots formed a government led by the Deputy Prime Minister, Otto Tief. On September 20 the Nazi German flag on Pikk Hermann was replaced with the tricolor flag of Estonia. On September 22 the Red Army took Tallinn and the Estonian flag on Pikk Hermann was replaced with the Soviet flag. The Estonian underground government, not officially recognized by either the Nazi Germany or Soviet Union, fled to Stockholm, Sweden and operated in exile until 1992, when Heinrich Mark, the Prime Minister of the Republic of Estonia in duties of the President in exile, presented his credentials to the newly elected President of Estonia Lennart Meri. On February 23, 1989 the flag of the Estonian SSR had been lowered on Pikk Hermann; it was replaced with the flag of Estonia to mark Estonian Independence Day on February 24, 1989.

== Estonians in German military units ==
When Germany fully occupied Estonia in the summer of 1941, the Germans began recruiting Estonian men into Wehrmacht rear security units, with the majority joining voluntarily, often out of the desire to fight the USSR which had occupied and annexed the country in 1940. Up to March 1942, drafted Estonians mostly served in the security units in the Army Group North Rear area. On August 28, 1942 the German powers announced the legal compilation of the so-called "Estonian Legion" within the Waffen SS. Oberführer Franz Augsberger was nominated the commander of the legion. Up to the end of 1942 about 1,280 men volunteered into the training camp. Bataillon Narwa was formed from the first 800 men of the Legion to have finished their training at Heidelager, being sent in April 1943 to join the Division Wiking in Ukraine. They replaced the Finnish Volunteer Battalion, recalled to Finland for political reasons. In March 1943, a partial mobilization was carried out in Estonia during which 12,000 men were conscripted into the SS. On May 5, 1943 the 3rd Waffen-SS Brigade (Estonian), another fully Estonian unit, was formed and sent to the front near Nevel.

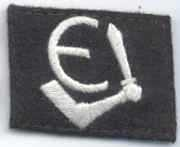
Divisional insignia of 20th Waffen Grenadier Division of the SS (1st Estonian)

By January 1944, the front was pushed back by the Red Army almost all the way to the former Estonian border. Jüri Uluots, the last constitutional Prime Minister of the Republic of Estonia, the leader of Estonian underground government delivered a radio address on February 7 that implored all able-bodied men born from 1904 through 1923 to report for military service in the SS (before this, Uluots had opposed any German mobilization of Estonians.) Following Uluots' address, 38.000 conscripts jammed registration centers. Several thousand Estonians who had volunteered to join the Finnish army were transferred back across the Gulf of Finland to join the newly formed Territorial Defense Force, assigned to defend Estonia against the Soviet advance. The maximum number of Estonians enrolled in German military units was 70,000. The initial formation of the volunteer Estonian Legion created in 1942 was eventually expanded to become a full-sized conscript division of the Waffen SS in 1944, the 20th Waffen Grenadier Division of the SS (1st Estonian). Units consisting largely of Estonians – often under German officers – saw action on the Narva line throughout 1944. Many Estonians hoped that they would attract support from the Allies, and ultimately a restoration of their interwar independence, by resisting the Soviet reoccupation of their country.

The advance guard units of the 2nd Shock Army reached the border of Estonia as a part of the Kingisepp–Gdov Offensive which began on 1 February 1944. Field Marshal Walter Model was nominated the leader of the German Army Group North. The Soviet Narva Offensive (15–28 February 1944) led by Soviet General Leonid A. Govorov, the commander of the Leningrad Front, commenced. On February 24, Estonian Independence Day, the counterattack of the so-called Estonian Division to break the Soviet bridgeheads began. A battalion of Estonians led by Rudolf Bruus destroyed a Soviet bridgehead. Another battalion of Estonians led by Ain-Ervin Mere was successful against another bridgehead, at Vaasa-Siivertsi-Vepsaküla. On March 6, this work was complete. The Leningrad Front concentrated 9 corps at Narva against 7 divisions and one brigade. On March 1, the Soviet Narva Offensive (1–4 March 1944) began in the direction of Auvere. The 658th Eastern Battalion led by Alfons Rebane and the 659th Eastern Battalion commanded by Georg Sooden were involved in defeating the operation. On March 17, twenty Soviet divisions again unsuccessfully attacked the three divisions in Auvere. On April 7, the leadership of the Red Army ordered to go on the defensive. In March the Soviets committed bombing attacks towards the towns of Estonia, including the bombing of Tallinn on March 9.

On July 24 the Soviets began the new Narva Offensive (July 1944) in the direction of Auvere. The 1st battalion (Stubaf Paul Maitla) of the 45th Regiment led by Harald Riipalu and the fusiliers (previously "Narva"), under the leadership of Hatuf Hando Ruus, were involved in repelling the attack. Finally, Narva was evacuated and a new front was settled on the Tannenberg Line in the Sinimäed Hills.

On 1 August 1944, the Finnish government and President Risto Ryti were to resign. On the next day, Aleksander Warma, the Estonian Ambassador to Finland (1939–1940 (1944)) announced that the National Committee of the Estonian Republic had sent a telegram, which requested the Estonian volunteer regiment to be returned to Estonia fully equipped. On the following day, the Finnish Government received a letter from the Estonians. It had been signed in the name of "all national organizations of Estonia" by Aleksander Warma, Karl Talpak and several others, seconding the request. It was then announced that the regiment would be disbanded and that the volunteers were free to return home. An agreement had been reached with the Germans, and the Estonians were promised amnesty if they chose to return and fight in the SS. As soon as they landed, the regiment was sent to perform a counter-attack against the Soviet 3rd Baltic Front, which had managed a breakthrough on the Tartu front, and was threatening the capital Tallinn.

After an attempt to break through the Tannenberg Line failed, the main struggle was carried to the south of Lake Peipus, where on August 11, Petseri was taken and Võru on August 13. Near Tartu, the 3rd Baltic Front was stopped by the Kampfgruppe "Wagner" which involved military groups sent from Narva under the command of Alfons Rebane and Paul Vent and the 5th SS Volunteer Sturmbrigade Wallonien led by Léon Degrelle.

On August 19, 1944 Jüri Uluots, in a radio broadcast, called for the Red Army to hold back and a peace agreement to be reached.

As Finland left the war on September 4, 1944 according to their peace agreement with the USSR, the defence of the mainland became practically impossible and the German command decided to retreat from Estonia. Resistance against the Soviets continued in the Moonsund Archipelago until November 23, 1944, when the Germans evacuated the Sõrve Peninsula. According to the Soviet data, the conquest of the territory of Estonia cost them 126,000 casualties. Some disregard the official figures and argue that a more realistic number is 480,000 for the Battle of Narva only, considering the intensity of the fighting at the front. On the German side, their own data shows 30,000 dead, which some have similarly seen as underrated, preferring at the minimum 45,000.

== German administrators ==
In 1941 Estonia was occupied by German troops and after a brief period of military rule by the commanders of the Army Group North (in the occupied USSR), a German civilian administration was established. On 5 December 1941, the territory of Estonia was organized as Generalbezirk Estland, subordinated to the Reichskommissariat Ostland.

=== Generalkommissar ===
(Subordinated to the Reichskommissar Ostland.)

- 1941–1944 SA-Obergruppenführer Karl-Siegmund Litzmann (1893-1945)

=== S.S. und Polizeiführer ===
(The SS and Police Leader (SSPF) was responsible for internal security and war against the resistance and was directly subordinated to the Higher SS and Police Leader (HSSPF) of Ostland, not to the Generalkommissar.)

- 1941–1944 SS-Oberführer Hinrich Möller (1906–1974)
- 1944 SS-Brigadeführer Walther Schröder (1902–1973)

=== Lagerkommandant ===
(Responsible for the operation of all concentration camps within the Reichskommissariat Ostland.)

- SS-Hauptsturmführer Hans Aumeier (1906–1947)

== Collaboration ==
=== Estonian Self-Administration ===
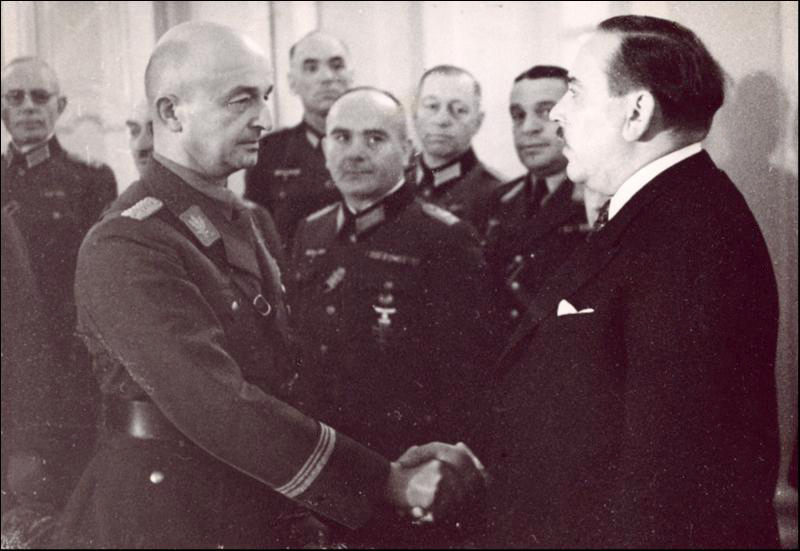
Generalkommissar Karl-Siegmund Litzmann and head of the Estonian Self-Administration Hjalmar Mäe

Estonian Self-Administration (Estonian: Eesti Omavalitsus), also known as the Directorate, was the puppet government set up in Estonia during occupation of Estonia by Nazi Germany. According to Estonian International Commission for the Investigation of Crimes Against Humanity

Although the Directorate did not have complete freedom of action, it exercised a significant measure of autonomy, within the framework of German policy, political, racial and economic. For example, the Directors exercised their powers pursuant to the laws and regulations of the Republic of Estonia, but only to the extent that these had not been repealed or amended by the German military command.

==== Directors ====
Director General

- 1941–1944 Hjalmar Mäe (1901–1978)

Director for Home Affairs

- 1941–1944 Oskar Angelus (1892–1979)

Directors for Justice

- 1941–1943 Hjalmar Mäe
- 1943–1944 Oskar Öpik

Director for Finance

- 1941–1944 Alfred Wendt (1902-1986)

=== Holocaust ===
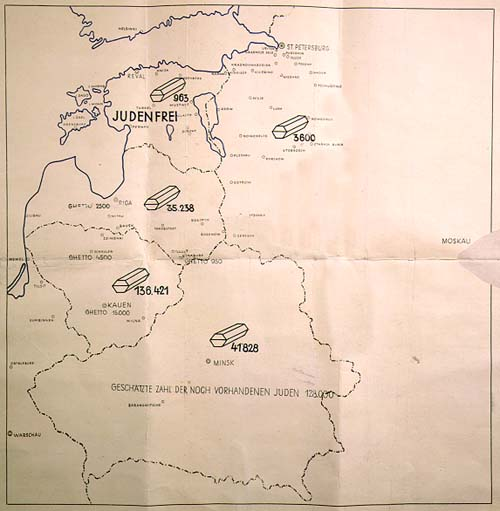
Map titled "Jewish Executions Carried Out by Einsatzgruppe A" from January 31, 1941 report by commander Stahlecker of a Nazi death squad. Marked "Secret Reich Matter," the map shows the number of Jews shot in Ostland, and reads at the bottom: "the estimated number of Jews still on hand is 128,000". Estonia is marked as judenfrei.

The process of Jewish settlement in Estonia began in the 19th century, when in 1865 Alexander II of Russia granted them the right to enter the region. The creation of the Republic of Estonia in 1918 marked the beginning of a new era for the Jews. Approximately 200 Jews fought in combat for the creation of the Republic of Estonia and 70 of these men were volunteers. From the very first days of her existence as a state, Estonia showed her tolerance towards all the peoples inhabiting her territories. On 12 February 1925 the Estonian government passed a law pertaining to the cultural autonomy of minority peoples. The Jewish community quickly prepared its application for cultural autonomy. Statistics on Jewish citizens were compiled. They totaled 3,045, fulfilling the minimum requirement of 3000 for cultural autonomy. In June 1926 the Jewish Cultural Council was elected and Jewish cultural autonomy was declared. Jewish cultural autonomy was of great interest to the global Jewish community. The Jewish National Endowment presented the Estonian government with a certificate of gratitude for this achievement.

There were, at the time of Soviet occupation in 1940, approximately 4000 Estonian Jews. The Jewish Cultural Autonomy was immediately abolished. Jewish cultural institutions were closed down. Many of Jewish people were deported to Siberia along with other Estonians by the Soviets. It is estimated that 350–500 Jews suffered this fate. About three-fourths of Estonian Jewry managed to leave the country during this period. Out the approximately 4,300 Jews in Estonia prior to the war, almost 1000 were entrapped by the Nazis.

Round-ups and killings of Jews began immediately following the arrival of the first German troops in 1941, who were closely followed by the extermination squad Sonderkommando 1a under Martin Sandberger, part of Einsatzgruppe A led by Walter Stahlecker. Arrests and executions continued as the Germans, with the assistance of local collaborators, advanced through Estonia.

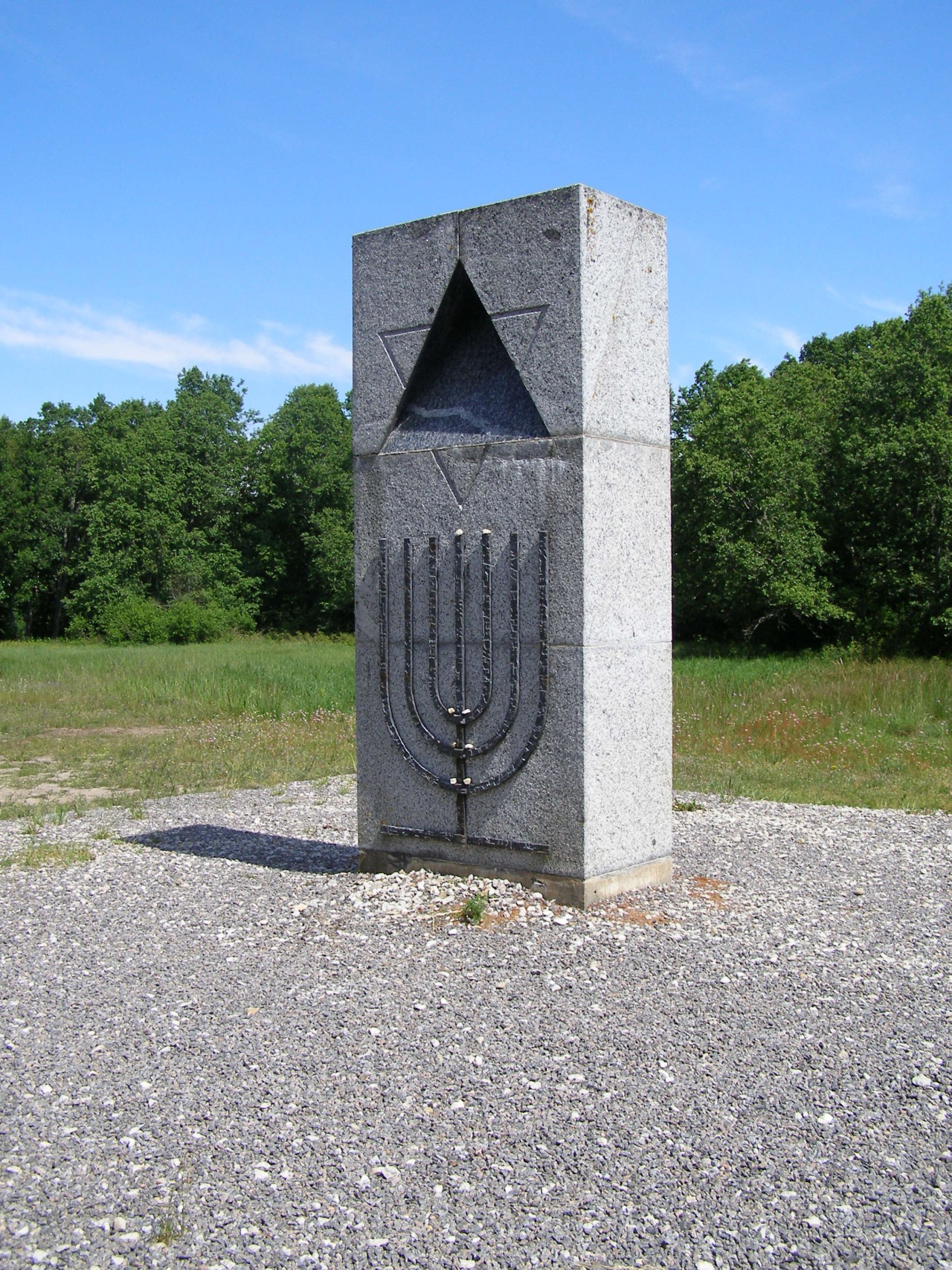
Holocaust memorial at the site of the former Klooga concentration camp, opened on 24th July 2005

Unlike German forces, some support apparently existed among an undefined segment of the local collaborators for anti-Jewish actions. The standard form used for the cleansing operations was arrest 'because of communist activity'. The equation between Jews and communists evoked a positive response among some Estonians. Estonians often argued that their Jewish colleagues and friends were not communists and submitted proofs of pro-Estonian conduct in hope to get them released.

Estonia was declared Judenfrei quite early by the German occupation regime at the Wannsee Conference. Jews that had remained in Estonia (921 according to Martin Sandberger, 929 according to Evgenia Goorin-Loov and 963 according to Walter Stahlecker) were killed. Fewer than a dozen Estonian Jews are known to have survived the war in Estonia. The Nazi regime also established 22 concentration and labor camps on occupied Estonian territory for foreign Jews. The largest, Vaivara concentration camp housed 1,300 prisoners at a time. These prisoners were mainly Jews, with smaller groups of Russians, Dutch, and Estonians. Several thousand foreign Jews were killed at the Kalevi-Liiva camp. Four Estonians most responsible for the murders at Kalevi-Liiva were accused at war crimes trials in 1961. Two were later executed, while the Soviet occupation authorities were unable to press charges against two who lived in exile. There have been knowingly 7 ethnic Estonians: Ralf Gerrets, Ain-Ervin Mere, Jaan Viik, Juhan Jüriste, Karl Linnas, Aleksander Laak and Ervin Viks that have faced trials for crimes against humanity. Since the reestablishment of the Estonian independence markers were put in place for the 60th anniversary of the mass executions that were carried out at the Lagedi, Vaivara and Klooga (Kalevi-Liiva) camps in September 1944.

There are three Estonians who have been honoured with The Righteous Among the Nations: Uku Masing and his wife Eha Masing and Polina Lentsman.

=== Estonian military units' involvement in crimes against humanity ===
The Estonian International Commission for the Investigation of Crimes Against Humanity has reviewed the role of Estonian military units and police battalions in an effort to identify the role of Estonian military units and police battalions participation during World War II in crimes against humanity.

The conclusions of the Estonian International Commission for the Investigation of Crimes Against Humanity are available online. It says that there is an evidence of Estonian units' involvement in crimes against humanity, and acts of genocide; however, the commission noted

Given the frequency with which police units changed their personnel, the Commission does not believe that membership in the cited units, or in any specific unit is, on its own, proof of involvement in crimes. However, those individuals who served in the units during the commission of crimes against humanity are to be held responsible for their own actions.

== See also ==
- 20th Waffen Grenadier Division of the SS (1st Estonian)
- Estonian resistance movement
- Judenfrei
- Klooga concentration camp
- Reichskommissariat Ostland
