= Karl Linnas =

Commandant of a Nazi concentration camp

- Born: August 6, 1919; Tartu, Estonia
- Died: July 2, 1987 (aged 67); Leningrad, Russian SFSR, Soviet Union
- Occupation: Nazi war criminal
- Status: Deceased
- Convictions: Treason; War crimes
- Penalty: Death; commuted to life imprisonment

Karl Linnas (August 6, 1919 – July 2, 1987) was an Estonian who was sentenced to death during the Holocaust trials in Soviet Estonia in 1961–1962. He was later deported from the United States to the Soviet Union in 1987.

Linnas was tried in absentia and sentenced to death by a Soviet court in 1962 on charges that during the German occupation, between 1941 and 1943, he was the commandant of a Nazi concentration camp at Tartu and had personally shot innocent civilians—men, women and children. After Soviet armies forced the Germans out of Estonia, Linnas fought with the German army and was wounded in 1944. Then he stayed in Displaced Persons camps in Germany until emigrating to the U.S. in 1951. He became an American citizen in 1960.

== Deportation from the United States ==
Linnas worked as a land surveyor living in Greenlawn, New York, until 1979, when U.S. immigration officials charged him with making false statements to gain entry to the United States.

The Office of Special Investigations of the U.S. Justice Department prosecuted Linnas. In 1981, the Federal District Court in Westbury, New York, stripped Linnas of his American citizenship for having lied to immigration officials 30 years earlier about his Nazi past. Linnas's crimes, the judge said, "were such as to offend the decency of any civilized society." A 1986 federal appeals court decision upheld the order for his deportation, ruling that the evidence against the defendant was "overwhelming and largely uncontroverted." In April 1986, as Linnas awaited the outcome of his final appeal, a federal judge ordered him imprisoned to prevent him from fleeing the country.

On April 20, 1987, the Supreme Court refused to hear Linnas's final appeal. At that point, he was flown to the Soviet Union. He yelled and fought with federal officials as he was escorted onto the plane. Linnas died nearly three months later, on July 2, 1987, at a prison hospital in Leningrad. He was the second formerly naturalized American to be deported to the Soviet Union, after Feodor Fedorenko, who was executed several weeks after Linnas died. Shortly after Linnas's death, it was discovered that the Soviet government had commuted his death sentence to life in prison due to his poor health. Linnas was reported to have been suffering from "heart disease, circulatory problems, internal hemorrhaging and cirrhosis of the liver" shortly before his death.
