= Estonian International Commission for Investigation of Crimes Against Humanity =

The Estonian International Commission for Investigation of Crimes Against Humanity (Estonian: Inimsusevastaste Kuritegude Uurimise Eesti Rahvusvaheline Komisjon; also known as the History Commission or Max Jakobson Commission) was the commission established by President of Estonia Lennart Meri in October 1998 to investigate crimes against humanity committed in Estonia or against its citizens during the Soviet and German occupation, such as Soviet deportations from Estonia and the Holocaust in Estonia.

It held its first session in Tallinn in January 1999. To promote independent inquiry and avoid conflict of interest, there were no Estonian citizens among its members. Finnish diplomat Max Jakobson was appointed chairman of the commission.

Research of the Commission has been relied on by the European Court of Human Rights, for example in its decision to not grant certiorari to review a complaint by August Kolk and Pyotr Kislyy, who had been convicted of crimes against humanity due to their roles in the Soviet deportations from Estonia.

The Commission fulfilled its purpose by 2007 and was succeeded by the Estonian Institute of Historical Memory.

== Members ==
- Max Jakobson, Chairman
- Uffe Ellemann-Jensen, President of the European Liberal Party, former Foreign Minister of Denmark
- Paul A. Goble, Director of Communications of Public Relations of Radio Free Europe/Radio Liberty
- Nicholas Lane, Chairman of the International Relations Commission of the American Jewish Committee
- Peter Reddaway, Professor of Political Science and International Affairs at the George Washington University
- Arseny Roginsky, Chairman of the Council of the Scientific and Educational Centre Memorial of Moscow, Scientific Programme Manager
- Wolfgang von Stetten, Mitglied des Deutschen Bundestages

== General and cited references ==
- Official website
- Mälksoo, Lauri (December 2001). "Soviet Genocide? Communist Mass Deportations in the Baltic States and International Law". Leiden Journal of International Law 14, 757–787. doi:10.1017/S0922156501000371.

== External links and further reading ==
- Links to reports of the Commission in English, Estonian, and Russian
