= Estonian Security Police and SD =

Security police force created by the Nazis in 1942 in occupied Estonia

The Estonian Security Police and SD (German: Sicherheitspolizei und SD Estland, Estonian: Eesti Julgeolekupolitsei ja SD), or Sipo, was a security police force created by the Germans in 1942 that integrated both Germans and Estonians within a unique structure mirroring the German Sicherheitspolizei.

Following the German occupation in 1941, the German Army created police Prefekts based upon the old Estonian police model. In 1942 a new Sicherheitspolizei structure was installed. The new Sipo force was designed by Martin Sandberger, leader of Einsatzkommando 1a. It was a unique joint structure that consisted of a German component called "Group A" with departments A-I to A-V and an Estonian component called "Group B" with corresponding departments. The Estonian Sipo wore the same uniforms as their German counterparts, and attended Sipo schools in the Reich.

== See also ==
- Occupation of Estonia by Nazi Germany
- Estonia in World War II
- Occupation of the Baltic states
