= Sirgala =

Village in Estonia

- Village
- Location within Estonia
- Coordinates: 59.32°N 27.78°E
- Country: Estonia
- County: Ida-Viru County
- Municipality: Narva-Jõesuu

Population (2020)
  - Total: 42
- Time zone: UTC+2 (EET)
  - Summer (DST): UTC+3 (EEST)

Sirgala is a village in Narva-Jõesuu municipality, Ida-Viru County, in northeastern Estonia. It is entirely surrounded by Mustanina village. Prior to the 2017 administrative reform of local governments, Sirgala was a neighbourhood and a distant exclave of the city of Kohtla-Järve. Much like the nearby village of Viivikonna, the village originated as a settlement for shale oil mine workers and large parts of it have been abandoned after the mines were closed.

Sirgala training area of the Estonian Defence Forces, is located south of Sirgala on a reforested oil-shale mining area in Mustanina village.
