= Vaivara (disambiguation) =

Vaivara may refer to:

- Vaivara, Estonia, a village in Estonia
- Vaivara Parish
- Vaivara concentration camp, located in the village
