= Kudruküla =

Village in Estonia

Coordinates: 59°27′N 28°05′E

- Village
- Interactive map of Kudruküla
- Country: Estonia
- County: Ida-Viru County
- Municipality: Narva-Jõesuu

Population (2021)
  - Total: 89
- Time zone: UTC+2 (EET)
  - Summer (DST): UTC+3 (EEST)

Kudruküla is a village in Narva-Jõesuu municipality, Ida-Viru County in northeastern Estonia, located on the lower course of the Narva River by the border with Russia. Prior to the 2017 administrative reform of local governments, it was located in Vaivara Parish. At the time of the 2021 census, the village had a population of 89.

== Geography ==
Kudruküla is located on the lower course of the Narva River and along the Estonian national road 91 between Narva-Jõesuu and Narva. It borders Russia in the north, Tõrvajõe in the east, Peeterristi in the south, the city of Narva (an exclave district also called Kudruküla) in the southwest and Narva-Jõesuu in the west. The village's western border is formed by Kudruküla oja, a tributary of the Narva.

== History ==
=== Prehistory ===
In the 1960s the remains of 15 neolithic dwellings were found in Kudruküla by Eldar Efendijev, then director of the Narva Museum. Expeditions uncovered a significant amount of bones and ceramics and an unusually high amount of amber pendants and clay idols. The site was immediately noted for its importance due to its status as a coastal Stone Age settlement that was never submerged by the Littorina Sea, allowing ground-penetrating radar to effectively locate artifacts. Genetic studies of skeletons dating to 4,300-2,500 BC recovered in the village in 2017 found that they belonged to the Comb Ceramic culture (CCC), which saw signs of intermarriage with the Corded Ware culture (CWC), and the Narva culture.

=== Recorded history ===
Kudruküla was first mentioned in 1503 as Kudderendorp. According to Finnish linguist Lauri Kettunen, the name may be connected to the dialectal word kudres 'black grouse' and the verb kudrutama referring to the bird's call, or be derived from a personal name *Kutroi.

The lands of the village were initially owned either by the state or the city of Narva. The nearby Kudruküla manor originally belonged to the city of Tallinn, until it was granted to the city of Narva in 1646 by Queen Christina of Sweden. In 1688, the manor, whose lands also included Hungerburg (modern Narva-Jõesuu), became state-owned in the Great Reduction during the reign of Charles XI. In that year, the village was populated by fourteen families, two of whom lived on the other side of Kudruküla oja in Väike-Kudruküla (lit. 'Little Kudruküla'). During the Great Famine of Estonia, people from nearby villages further away from the river moved to Kudruküla to live by its fishing waters, causing the village's population to double.

The traditional dialect spoken in Kudruküla was a northeastern coastal Estonian dialect with significant influence from Ingrian Finnish and Izhorian.

A village school was established in 1862, whose district also included nearby Riigiküla. Kudruküla was the center of a municipality from 1866 until 1891, when it became part of the Peetri parish. The development of Narva-Jõesuu, which belonged to the Kudruküla manor owned by the city of Narva, into a spa town began in 1873 and it became a borough in 1917. Kudruküla became administratively part of the borough in June 1920. The village had a population of 110 in 1922, being much of the population of what was Narva-Jõesuu at that time.

Kudruküla was largely destroyed during World War II. After the war, the Leekova bog near the village was drained and allotment gardens were built on it. Nowadays, the area of the bog is part of the city of Narva as the Kudruküla district.
