= Utria =

Utria may refer to

- Utría National Natural Park, named after the Ensenada de Utría (Utría Cove), a national park on the Pacific coast of Colombia
- Udria, a village in Ida-Viru County in northeastern Estonia
- Battle of Utria, which took place during the Estonian War of Independence on 17–20 January 1919 at Udria beach
