= Klooga concentration camp =

Subcamp of the Vaivara concentration camp complex in German-occupied Estonia

Coordinates: 59°19′12.51″N 24°12′48.07″E

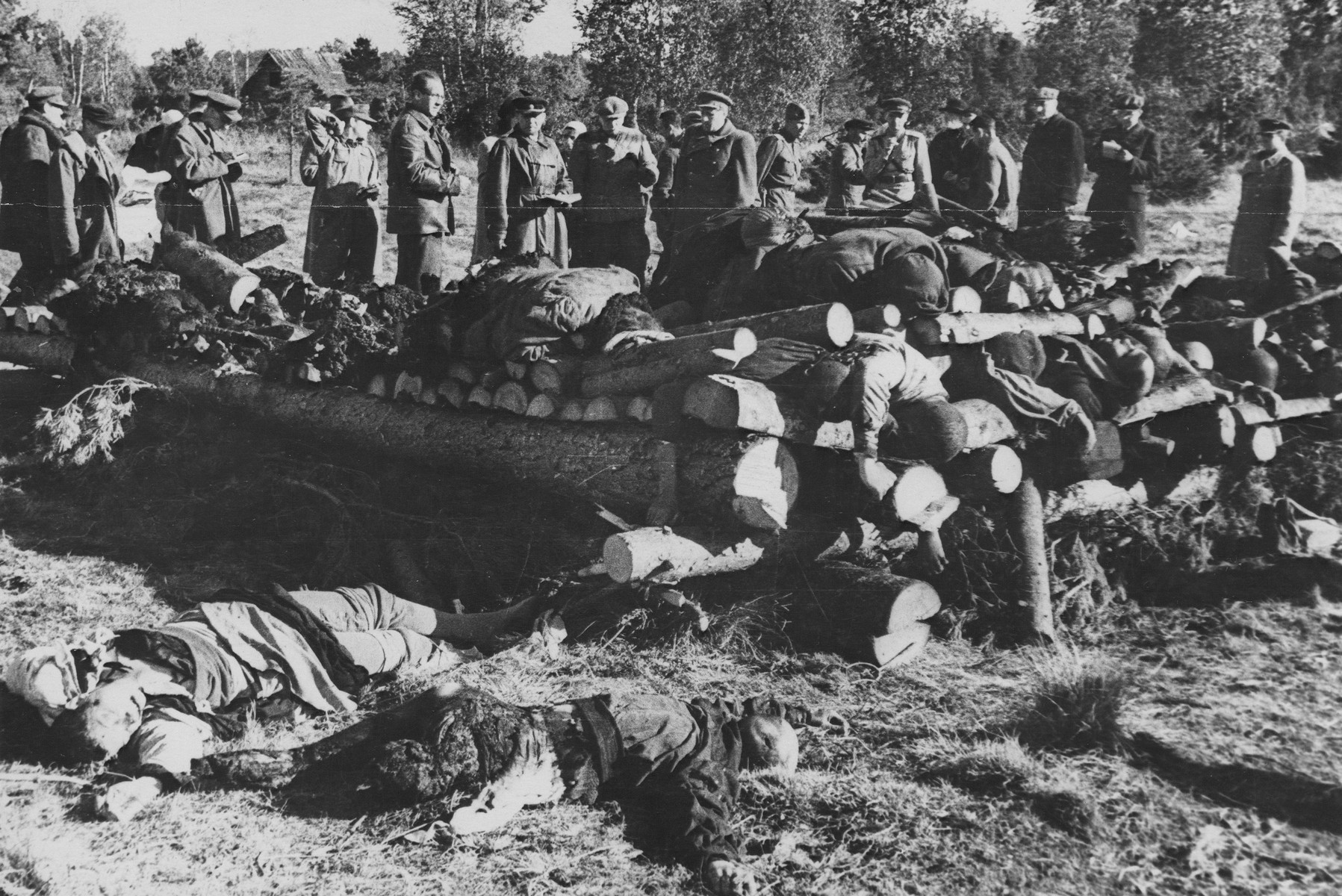
Corpses found at Klooga concentration camp after liberation; Red Army personnel in background

Klooga concentration camp was a Nazi forced labor subcamp of the Vaivara concentration camp complex established in September 1943 in Harju County, during World War II, in German-occupied Estonia near the village of Klooga. The Vaivara camp complex was commanded by German officers Hans Aumeier, Otto Brennais and Franz von Bodmann and consisted of 20 field camps, some of which existed only for short periods.

It is estimated that 1,800–2,000 prisoners perished at Klooga from wanton killings, epidemics and working conditions. Most of them were Jews. Those who survived were transported to the Stutthof concentration camp in occupied Poland ahead of the Soviet advance.

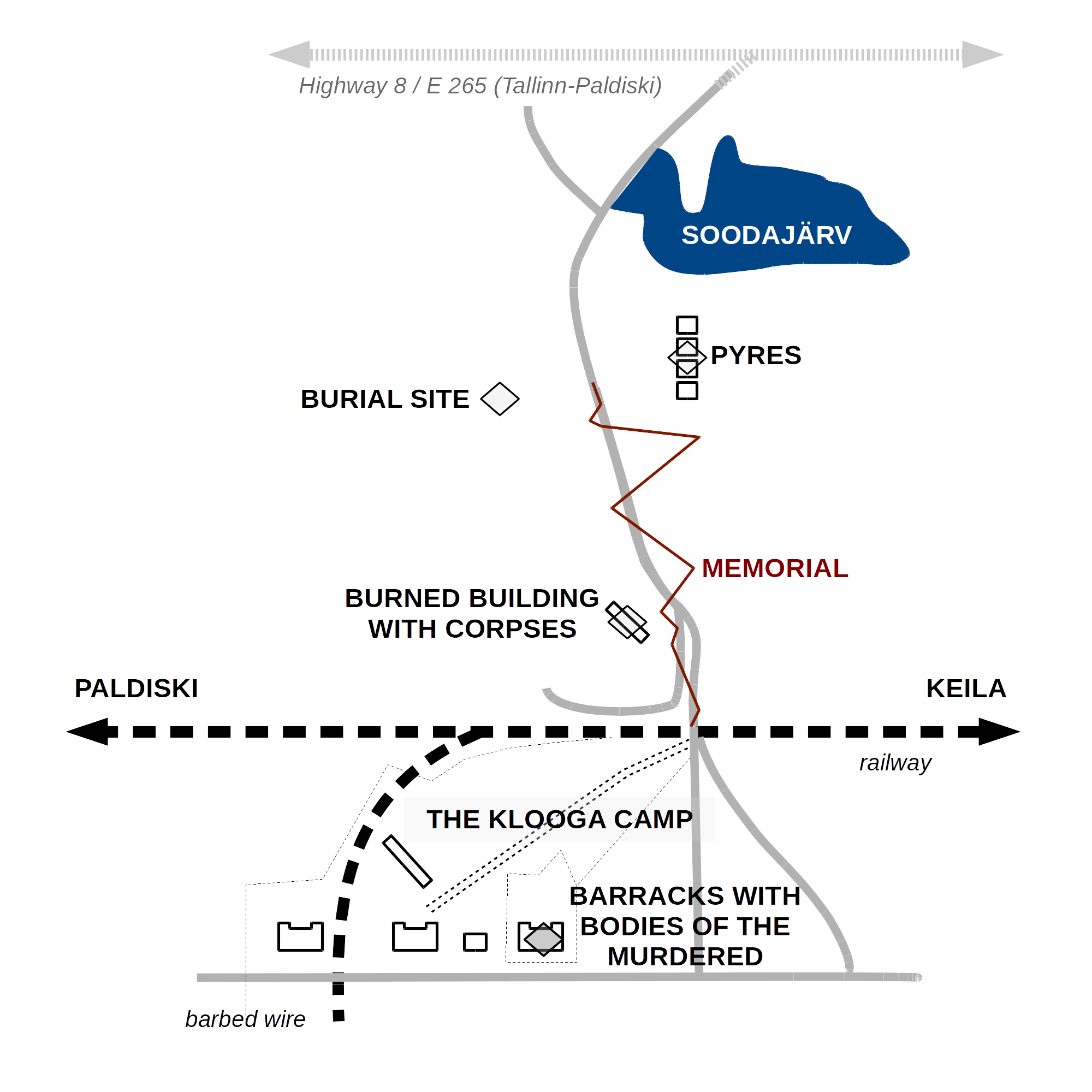
Map of Klooga concentration camp

== The camp ==
During the German occupation, Estonia was part of the Reichskommissariat Ostland, a German civilian administration that governed the Baltic states and western Belorussia.

Over time, at any moment Klooga held between about 1,500 and 2,500 male and female prisoners. Prisoners included Soviet POW, Estonian political prisoners and Jews. Jews constituted a vast majority after large numbers of them forcibly relocated in August and September 1943 from the Kovno and Vilna Ghettos in Lithuania, and Salaspils Ghetto in Latvia. Smaller numbers of inmates were from Estonia, Russia and Romania.

The entire camp was enclosed by barbed wire. The men's and women's camps, which were separated by some 600 yards, had large two-story buildings for housing the prisoners. German SS units and members of the 287th Estonian Police Battalion served as guards. Prisoners were forced to work in peat harvesting as well as in the camp cement works, sawmills, brickworks, and factory, which manufactured clogs for camp prisoners. Conditions were extremely harsh. In the early years of the camp's operation, a group of some 75 prisoners began to organize resistance within Klooga; however, the frequent transfer of prisoners from camp to camp — both within Estonia and throughout Nazi-occupied territories — stymied the underground movement's ability to mount an effective resistance.

== Evacuation and liberation ==
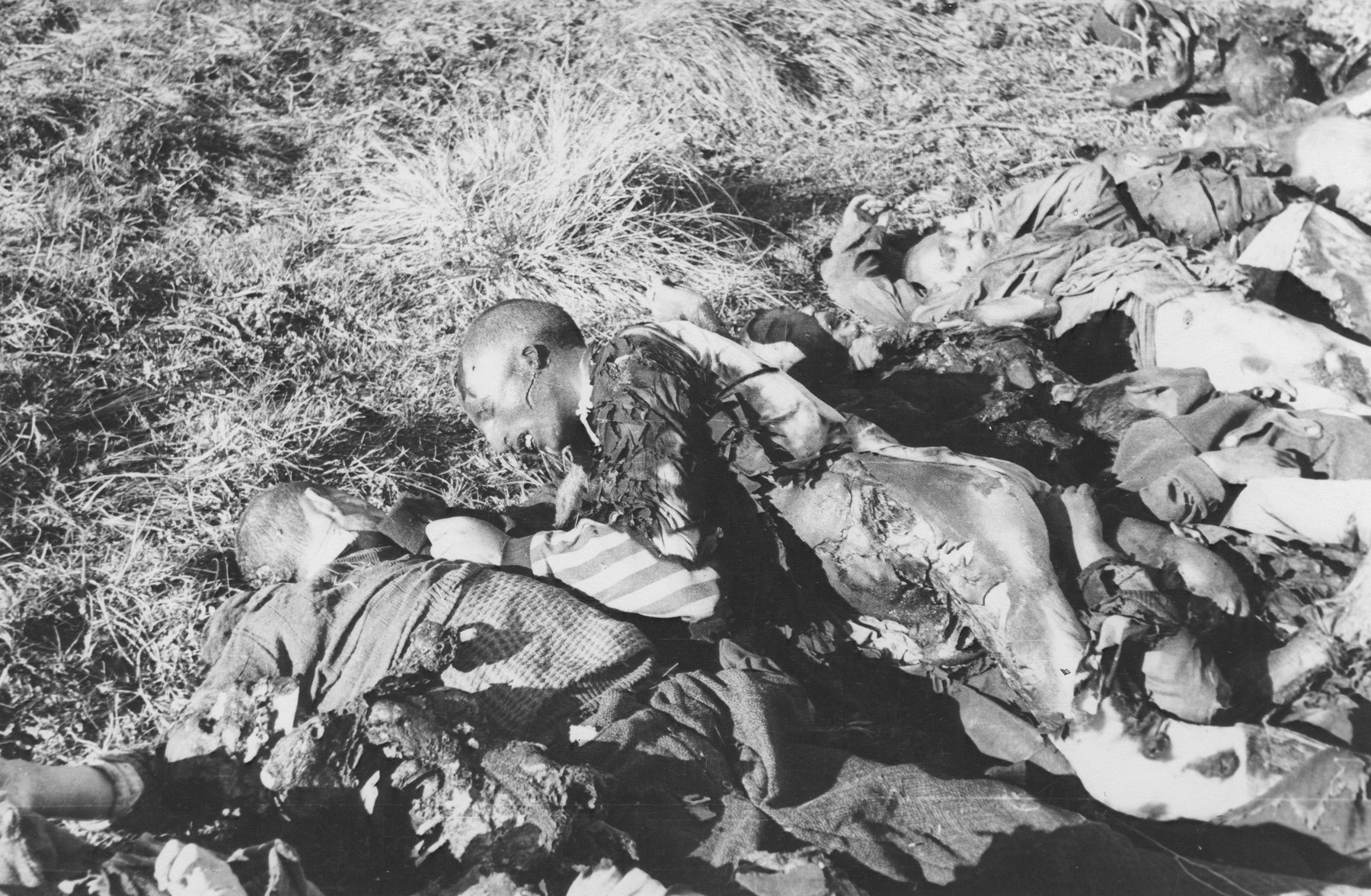
Remains of prisoners at Klooga concentration camp

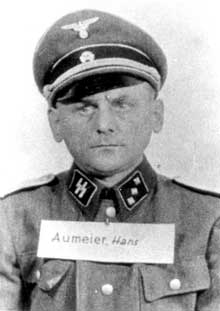
Hans Aumeier

When the Soviet army began its advance through Nazi-occupied Estonia in September 1944, the SS started to evacuate the camp. Many prisoners were sent west by sea to the Stutthof concentration camp near Danzig and to Freiburg in Schlesien, present day Świebodzice, then in Germany, now Poland.

From 19–22 September 1944, with the perimeter of the camp guarded by 60–70 Estonian recruits to the 20th SS Division, a German task force began systematically slaughtering the remaining prisoners in a nearby forest. According to Ruth Bettina Birn the execution of 2,000 prisoners was conducted by Estonian soldiers of 20th SS Division and presumably Schutzmannschaft Battalion under German command.

According to Soviet sources, approximately 2,000 were shot, then their bodies were stacked onto wooden pyres and burned. On 22 September 1944, when Soviet troops reached the Klooga camp, only 85 of the 2,400 prisoners remaining post-evacuation had managed to survive by hiding inside the camp or escaping into the surrounding forests. The liberation forces found numerous pyres of stacked corpses left unburned by the camp's guards when they fled. In October 30,1944 issue of Life Magazine John Hersey wrote of a Jewish survivor of Klooga "Prisoner 339, Klooga." SS-Hauptsturmführer Hans Aumeier, a German, who was Lagerkommandant (camp commander) for all Estonia, as well as having worked at Auschwitz, Dachau, and Buchenwald, was subsequently arrested and put on trial for crimes against humanity. He was sentenced to death in Kraków, Poland, on 22 December 1947, and executed on 28 January 1948.

== Commemoration ==
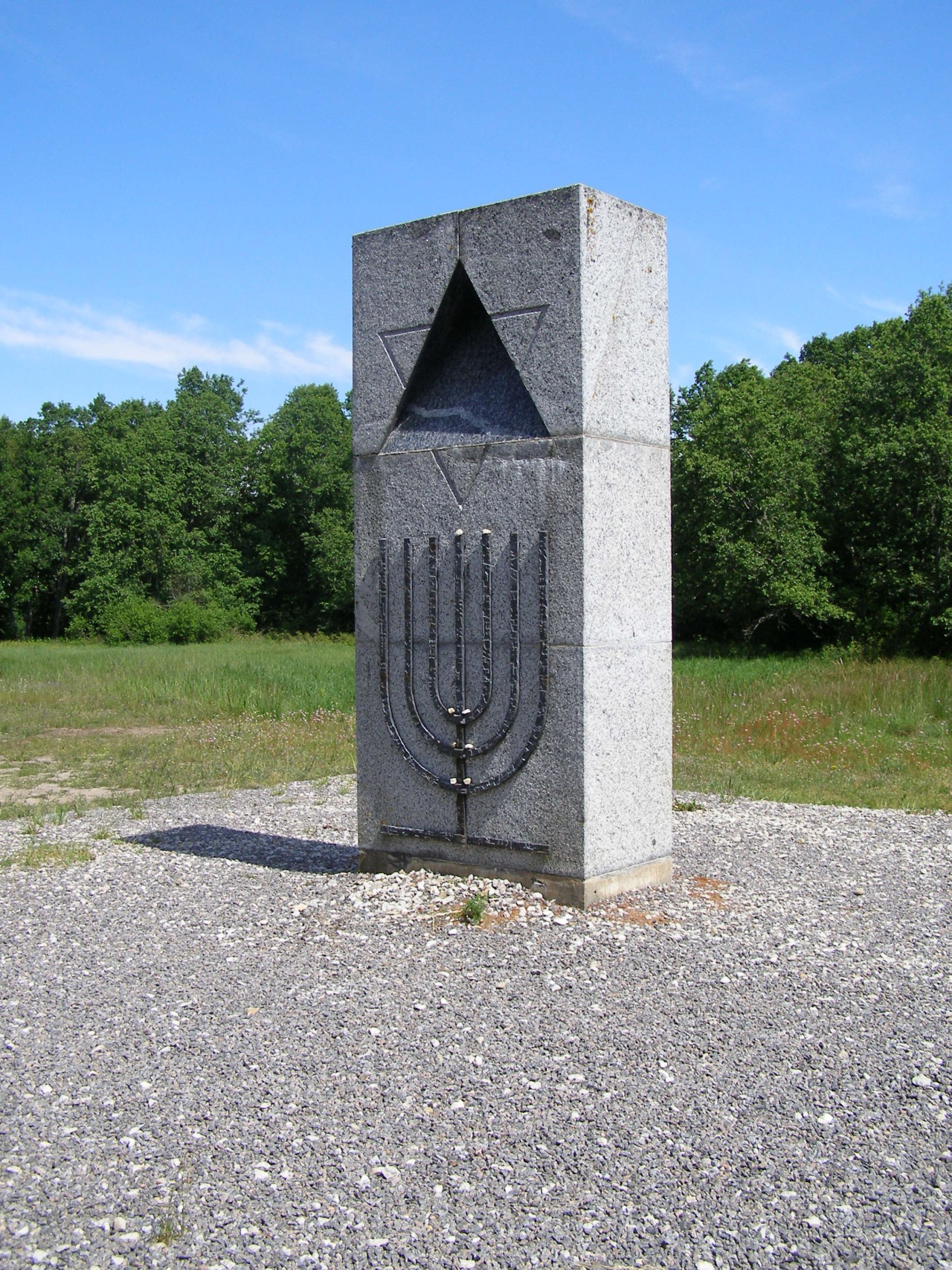
Holocaust memorial at the site of the former Klooga concentration camp, opened on 1 September 1994

On 1 September 1994, a memorial to the Jews killed in the Second World War was unveiled in Klooga on the territory of the former concentration camp. The memorial was erected at the initiative of the Jewish Cultural Society and with the support of the Estonian Government.

In May 2005, Estonian Prime Minister Andrus Ansip visited Klooga and both condemned the Holocaust and expressed sorrow that some Estonian citizens were complicit in war crimes during World War II:

Although these murderers must answer for their crimes as individuals, the Estonian Government continues to do everything possible to expose these crimes. I apologise for the fact that Estonian citizens could be found among those who participated in the murdering of people or assisted in the perpetration of these crimes.

In July 2005, President of Estonia Arnold Rüütel, Israeli Ambassador Shemi Zur, and Holocaust survivors took part in an unveiling ceremony for the gray marble memorial stone, inscribed with following words: "Between 1941 and 1944, the German occupying powers established 20 labour and concentration camps in Estonia. Thousands of people from a number of countries were killed in these camps because they were Jewish. This is the site of the Klooga concentration camp". Later in the year Israeli President Moshe Katsav laid a wreath at the site of the camp deep in the Estonian forest while on a diplomatic tour of the Baltic countries.

== See also ==
- The Holocaust
- List of concentration and internment camps
- List of Nazi-German concentration camps
- Nazi concentration camps
- World War II
