= Inge Sylten and Heinz Drosihn =

Inge Sylten

Inge Sylten (born August 23, 1925 in Prague) was a young Jewish girl from Czechoslovakia who was deported in a transport from Theresienstadt Ghetto to Estonia in September 1942. Heinz Drosihn was an SS-Unterscharführer and the commandant of Ereda concentration camp in Estonia. Their paths intersect in the camp, where they fell in love, were forced to flee, and subsequently were shot or committed suicide during their flight to Scandinavia. Their story was preserved mainly thanks to fellow inmates of Inge Sylten. The Czech filmmaker and researcher Lukáš Přibyl called their story "... Romeo and Juliet story in a concentration camp".

== Background ==
After the arrival to Estonia, Inge Sylten was sent to slave work in the Jägala concentration camp, a facility with less harsh conditions than in other camps. In mid-October 1943, the surviving Czech and German Jewish women were sent to Ereda concentration camp, a division of the Vaivara concentration camp in northeastern Estonia. Their position in the camp was somewhat privileged, as they apparently came from the upper classes of society and usually spoke good German. Heinz Drosihn noticed Inge immediately after her arrival to the camp. He was considered a "normal cruel SS man", however, he visited her in the camp's emergency room on the same day and asked if she was cold. She initially refused better blankets and more food, but few days later she moved to his house and became his personal cook. Her influence in the camp gradually increased. During one occasion, she forbade the commandant to use his whip with whom he had punished the inmates. She also sent a carriage for a group of inmates stranded in a snowstorm. However, their relationship was not one-sided and Drosihn was not exploited by a clever inmate. Gisela Danziger, Drosihn's former personal cook, recalled that after few weeks of their relationship he pulled off the military insignia from his uniform, claiming that he doesn't want to serve the SS anymore. "It was like they forgot where they are completely," Danziger said.

This lasted for three months until the command of the Vaivara concentration camp intervened. During a control in February 1944, they found Inge Sylten living in unusually good conditions. She was beaten and interrogated. Drosihn came back to the camp shortly after that, but immediately disappeared. Three days later, Inge Sylten disappeared too, with the help of Danziger, who dug a tunnel under the barbed wire fence drawn around the camp. The pair planned to flee to Finland through the Gulf of Finland; however, they were soon captured. They were shot or committed suicide. They were buried in an unknown place.

== Legacy ==
The story was covered by the documentary Forgotten Transports: To Estonia.
