= Battle of Laagna =

1919 military conflict in Estonia during Estonian War of Independence

- Part of the Estonian War of Independence
Date	18 January 1919
Location	Laagna, Estonia 59°23′N 27°59′E
Result	Estonian victory

Belligerents
Estonia (Finland) Finnish volunteers	Soviet Russia

Commanders and leaders
(Sweden) Martin Ekström (Sweden) Bror Dahlgrén (Estonia) Aleksander Paulus	Unknown

Units involved
(Finland) 1st Finnish Volunteer Corps: 3rd Company; 4th Company; (Estonia) Meredessantpataljon: Narva students group	(Russian Soviet Federative Socialist Republic) 6th Rifle Division: 7th Regiment; 86th Regiment

Strength
220 soldiers	650 soldiers 2 armoured trains

Casualties and losses
4 killed 21 wounded 3 captured	Unknown
- Location within Estonia

Battle of Laagna (Estonian: Laagna lahing; 17 January 1919) took place in Laagna, Estonia, during the Estonian War of Independence. A battalion of Estonian marines and four companies of Finnish volunteers under the overall command of Martin Ekström attacked Red Army positions at Laagna as part of a wider operation targeting Narva.

In the morning the Estonians and Finns took Laagna village with a surprise attack and pushed the Red Army out. Against the Estonian mariners and Finnish volunteers (220 men altogether) were two regiments of Red Army infantry, two armoured trains and some cavalry units. The Soviets repeatedly attacked the Estonian and Finnish positions with armored trains but were unable to capture Laagna and were driven back with heavy losses. The Estonian Marines and Finns lost four troops killed, 21 wounded and three captured.
