= Olgina =

Olgina could refer to:

- Olgina, Narva-Jõesuu, a borough in Narva-Jõesuu, Estonia
- Olgina, Narva, one of the neighborhoods of Narva, Estonia
- Feminine form of the Russian-language surname Olgin
  - Olga Olgina (1904–1979), Polish opera singer
