= Meredessantpataljon =

Estonian military unit

Meredessantpataljon Marine Landing Battalion
- Shoulder insignia of the Marine Landing Battalion.
- Active: 1919
- Country: Estonia
- Branch: Estonian Navy
- Type: Marines
- Role: Amphibious warfare Coastal warfare Cold-weather warfare Raiding
- Size: 400
- Garrison/HQ: Tallinn, Estonia
- Anniversaries: 5 March 1919
- Engagements: Estonian War of Independence

Commanders
- Commander: Lieutenant Peeter Kask

The Meredessantpataljon, was a short-lived Estonian marine infantry battalion during the Estonian War of Independence of the Estonian Defence Forces subject to the Estonian Navy. The battalion was created from the crews of the Estonian surface warships, students and Finnish volunteer soldiers. The battalion was created and later disbanded in Tallinn after it had fulfilled its military objectives in 1919.

As common marine infantry tasks include providing security in a warship whilst at sea and reflecting the pressed nature of the ships company and the risk of mutiny. Also other tasks include boarding of vessels during combat or capture of prize ships and providing manpower for raiding ashore in support of the naval objectives, the Estonian Meredessantpataljon was more focused on contributing to the campaign ashores, in supporting of the military objectives.

Another difference from the usual marines is that the Estonian marines unit was only a temporary military formation. The unit was operational from March to June in 1919. Today there are no marine infantry or marine special force units among the Estonian Defence Forces.

== History ==
The Meredessantpataljon was mainly used on the Southern Front since 1919, yet it also participated in the battle of Laagna and the liberation of Narva and in other naval campaigns in northeast Estonia in Ida-Viru county. In March 1919 the marine battalion was designated onto the Armoured Train Nr. 5 and was shipped to the Southern Front in Northern Latvia to Valka.

=== Origins and creation ===
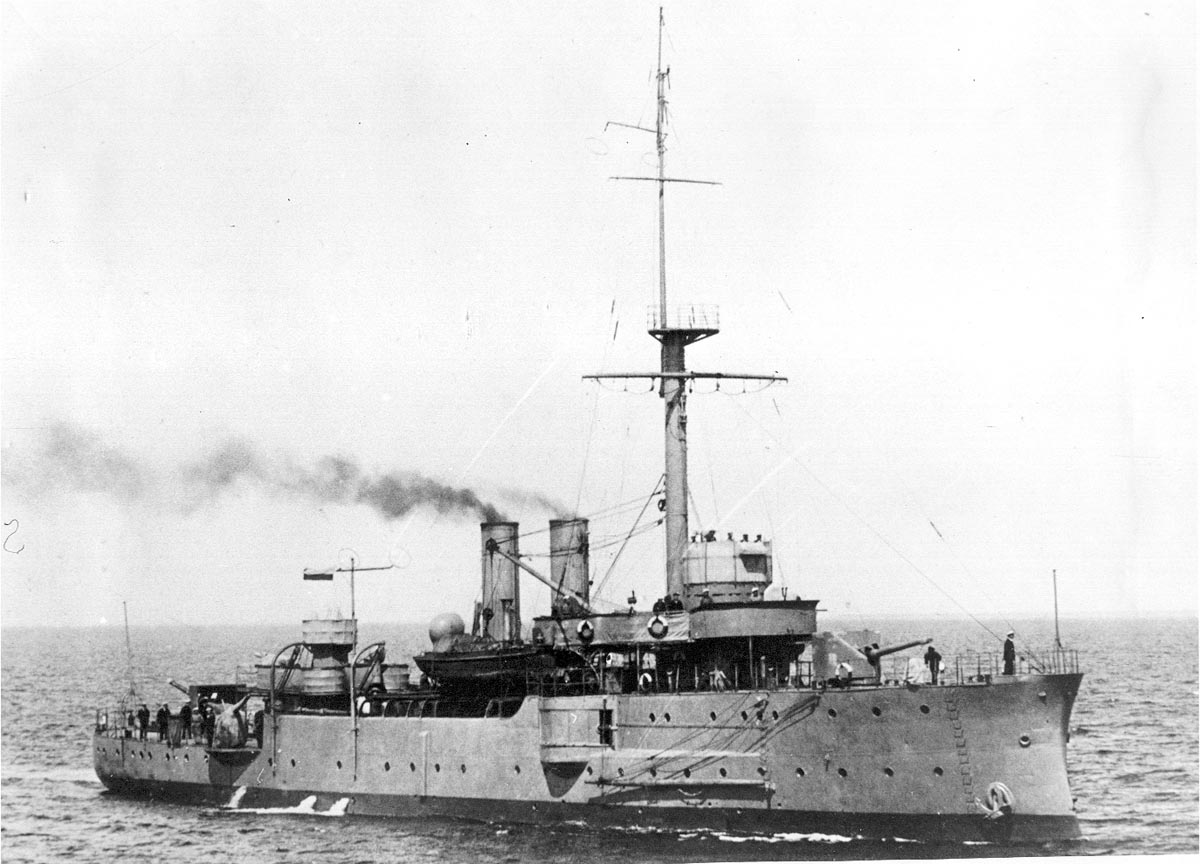
Estonian Navy gunboat ENS Lembit.

The first pre-marine battalion unit was formed from the warship sailors in February 1919 which also took part in the restoration of order in Saaremaa during the pro-Soviet Saaremaa Uprising.

On March 5, 1919 the first Estonian marine unit was created which was made up from the crews of the bigger warships, mainly from destroyers ENS Lennuk and ENS Vambola, gunboat ENS Lembit, minesweepers ENS Kalew and ENS Olew, which stationed in Tallinn. The battalion was strengthened further with the Peipus flotilla marines, volunteer students and also soldiers from the major Ekström Finnish volunteer Regiment "Sons of the North". On March 16 the battalion was transferred to Southern Front and had a strength of 293 marines. After arriving to the front the unit received another 28 sailors from the Peipus flotilla. On March 23 the battalion was reinforced with the 4th company and the naval officers platoon along with a 130mm railway gun platform. In total the battalion battle strength was around 400 marines at its peak and it was intended to primarily play a support role in coastal warfare.

=== War of Independence ===
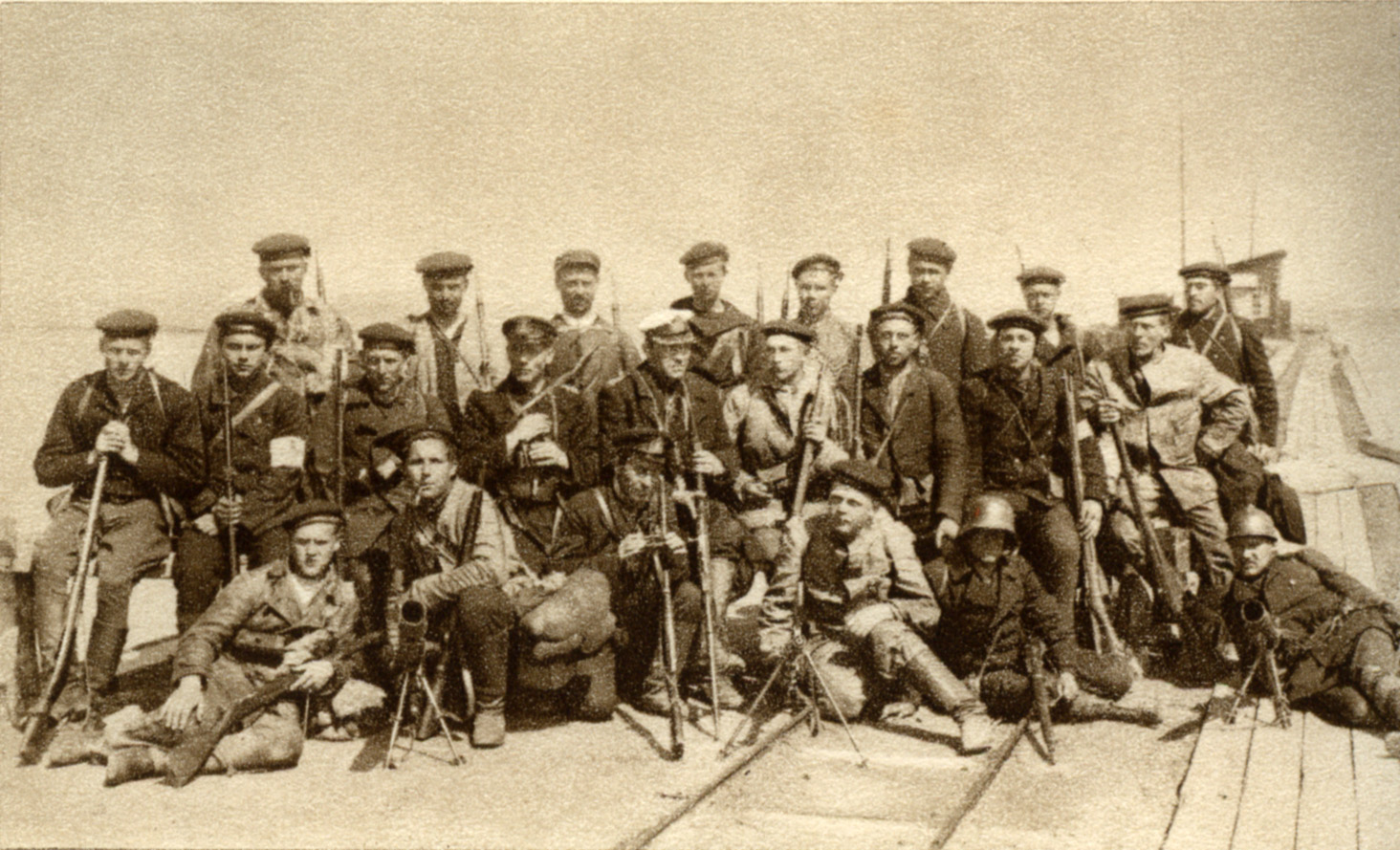
Estonian marines of the Meredessantpataljon, in May, 1919.

The unit saw first action on March 19 near Orava in Luuka village. Although the unit suffered under severe casualties it captured several nearby villages and the Orava estate. At the end of March the battalion was transferred to Tallinn. On April 16 the Meredessantpataljon was joined up with a naval squadron heading towards Heinaste with an operational aim was to capture it.

The marine infantry battalion was closed before the end of the independence war as the unit had achieved its operational tasks and had no longer a role on the war theatre. The unit was disbanded on June 1, 1919. After the war the Estonian Navy began to rebuild some of the former Russian sea fortifications and coastal artillery positions, along with the purchase of the modern submarines from United Kingdom in late 1930s there was no longer a need for marine infantry units in Estonia.

== Battalion attributes ==
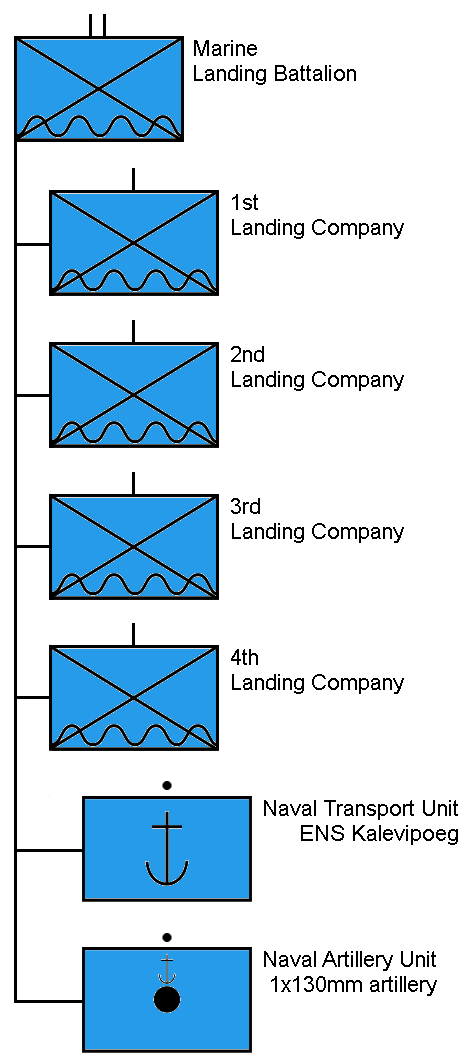
Structure of the Estonian Marine Landing Battalion.

In addition to the ground operations the battalion operated also on coastal warfare. For naval transport purposes a former Swedish cargo steam boat "Nordkysten" was designated under the command of the marine battalion commander on March 5. On April 13 the marine infantry vessel was renamed after ENS Kalevipoeg. Some minor reconstruction works were carried out on the vessel in order to make room for a landing force of 200 marines and their equipment and also two 47mm cannons were added on the surface deck.

=== Order of battle and equipment ===
The marine transport vessel ENS Kalevipoeg.

The Meredessantpataljon comprised total of four infantry companies of which the 4th Company was made up by the Finnish volunteers. The unit never received any special purpose training or combat preparations and was often used as a strike force both on land and on coastal operations.

The marine infantry battalion had the following battle order in 1919:

- 1st Company
- 2nd Company
- 3rd Company
- 4th Company
- ENS Kalevipoeg - marine infantry transport steam boat.
- 1x130mm naval gun, occasionally attached to the unit.

=== Decorations and insignia ===
The Meredessantpataljon did not receive any special military uniforms or unit decorations due to its short period of existence. The average military uniform in the battalion was often made up by various other uniforms as the unit was a mixture of different field and naval warship crew units.

== See also ==
- Estonian Navy
- Coastal batteries of Estonia
- Estonian War of Independence
