= Battle of Utria =

1919 military conflict in Estonia during Estonian War of Independence

- Part of Estonian War of Independence
Date	17–20 January 1919
Location	Udria, Estonia 59°24′N 27°55′E
Result	Estonian victory

Belligerents
Estonia (Finland) Finnish volunteers	(Russian Soviet Federative Socialist Republic) Soviet Russia

Commanders and leaders
(Estonia) Johan Pitka (Estonia) Aleksander Paulus (Sweden) Martin Ekström	(Russian Soviet Federative Socialist Republic) Nikolai N. Ivanov

Units involved
(Estonia) Estonian Navy (Estonia) Meredessantpataljon (Finland) 1st Finnish Volunteer Corps	(Russian Soviet Federative Socialist Republic) 6th Rifle Division: 7th Regiment; 86th Regiment

Strength
1,900 soldiers 2 destroyers 1 gunboat 1 transport ship	2,700 soldiers

Casualties and losses
32 killed	About 300 killed
- Location within Estonia

Battle of Utria (Estonian: Utria Lahing) also known as the Utria Landing (Estonian: Utria Dessant) took place during the Estonian War of Independence on 17–20 January 1919 at Udria beach. It was an amphibious landing consisting mainly of Finnish volunteers.

== Background ==
=== Estonian forces ===
The naval Taskforce was under the command of Admiral Johan Pitka, he was supported by the Swedish naval officer Martin Ekström and by Captain Aleksander Paulus and Captain Anto Nestori Eskola. The invasion force consisted of roughly 1,900 soldiers under the command of Colonel Martin Ekström.

=== Soviet forces ===
Elements of the 6th Rifle Division defending the area were under the command of Nikolai Ivanov. In total the Soviets were able to muster a force of 2,700 men to defend the area from the Estonian military.

== Aftermath ==
The successful landing undertaken by the Estonian military, enabled Estonian units to liberate the border town of Narva on 19 January 1919.
