= Soldina =

Village in Estonia

Coordinates: 59°22′N 28°04′E

- Village
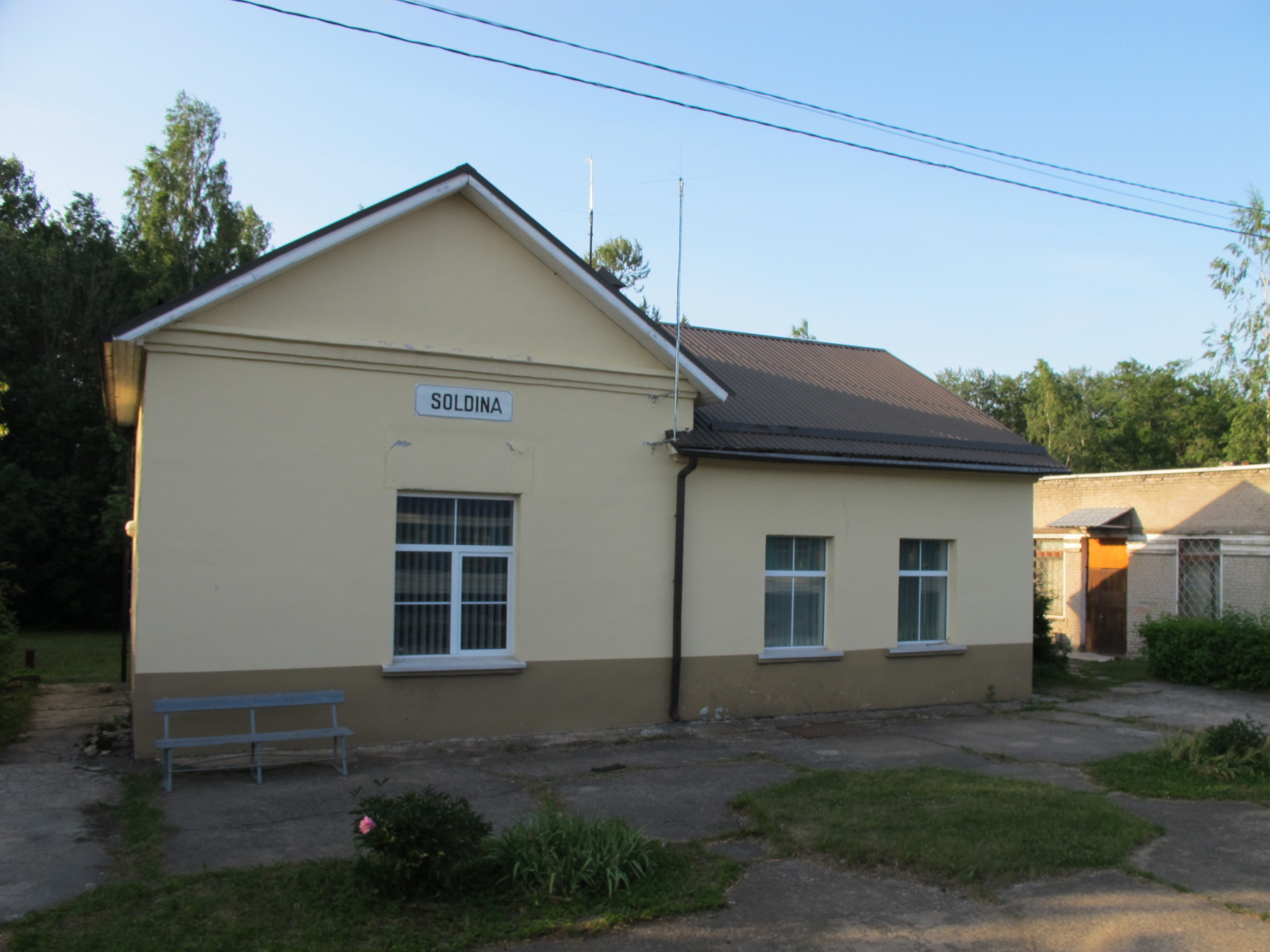
- Soldina railway station
- Interactive map of Soldina
- Country: Estonia
- County: Ida-Viru County
- Municipality: Narva-Jõesuu
- Time zone: UTC+2 (EET)
  - Summer (DST): UTC+3 (EEST)

Soldina is a village in Narva-Jõesuu municipality, Ida-Viru County in northeastern Estonia. Prior to the 2017 administrative reform of local governments, it was located in Vaivara Parish.

Narva Airfield (ICAO: EENA) is located in Soldina.

Preceding station	Elron	Following station
Auvere towards Tallinn	Tallinn–Narva	Narva Terminus
