= Meriküla, Ida-Viru County =

Village in Estonia

Coordinates: 59°24′49″N 27°57′32″E

Meriküla
- Village
- Interactive map of Meriküla
- Country: Estonia
- County: Ida-Viru County
- Municipality: Narva-Jõesuu
- Time zone: UTC+2 (EET)
  - Summer (DST): UTC+3 (EEST)

Meriküla is a village in Narva-Jõesuu municipality, Ida-Viru County in northeastern Estonia. Prior to the 2017 administrative reform of local governments, it was located in Vaivara Parish.

== Notable people ==
- Johann Friedrich von Brandt (1802–1879), a German-Russian naturalist, died in Meriküla.
