= Hundinurga =

Village in Estonia

Coordinates: 59°22′N 27°53′E

- Village
- Interactive map of Hundinurga
- Country: Estonia
- County: Ida-Viru County
- Municipality: Narva-Jõesuu
- Time zone: UTC+2 (EET)
  - Summer (DST): UTC+3 (EEST)

Hundinurga is a village in Narva-Jõesuu municipality, Ida-Viru County in northeastern Estonia. Prior to the 2017 administrative reform of local governments, it was located in Vaivara Parish.
