= Vaivara Parish =

Former municipality of Estonia

Coordinates: 59°22′02″N 27°45′47″E

Vaivara Parish Vaivara vald
- Former municipality of Estonia
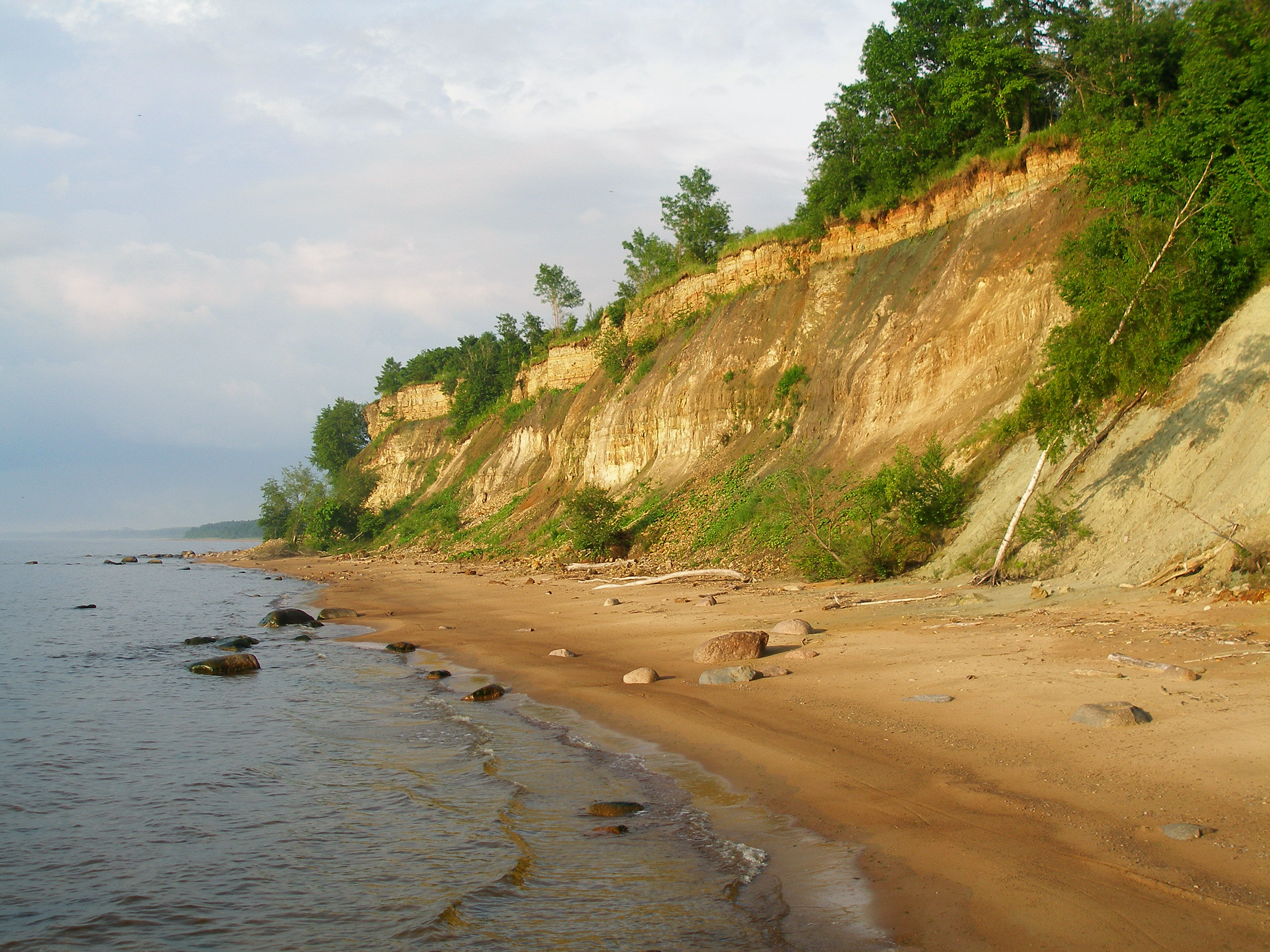
- Udria cliff

- Flag Coat of arms

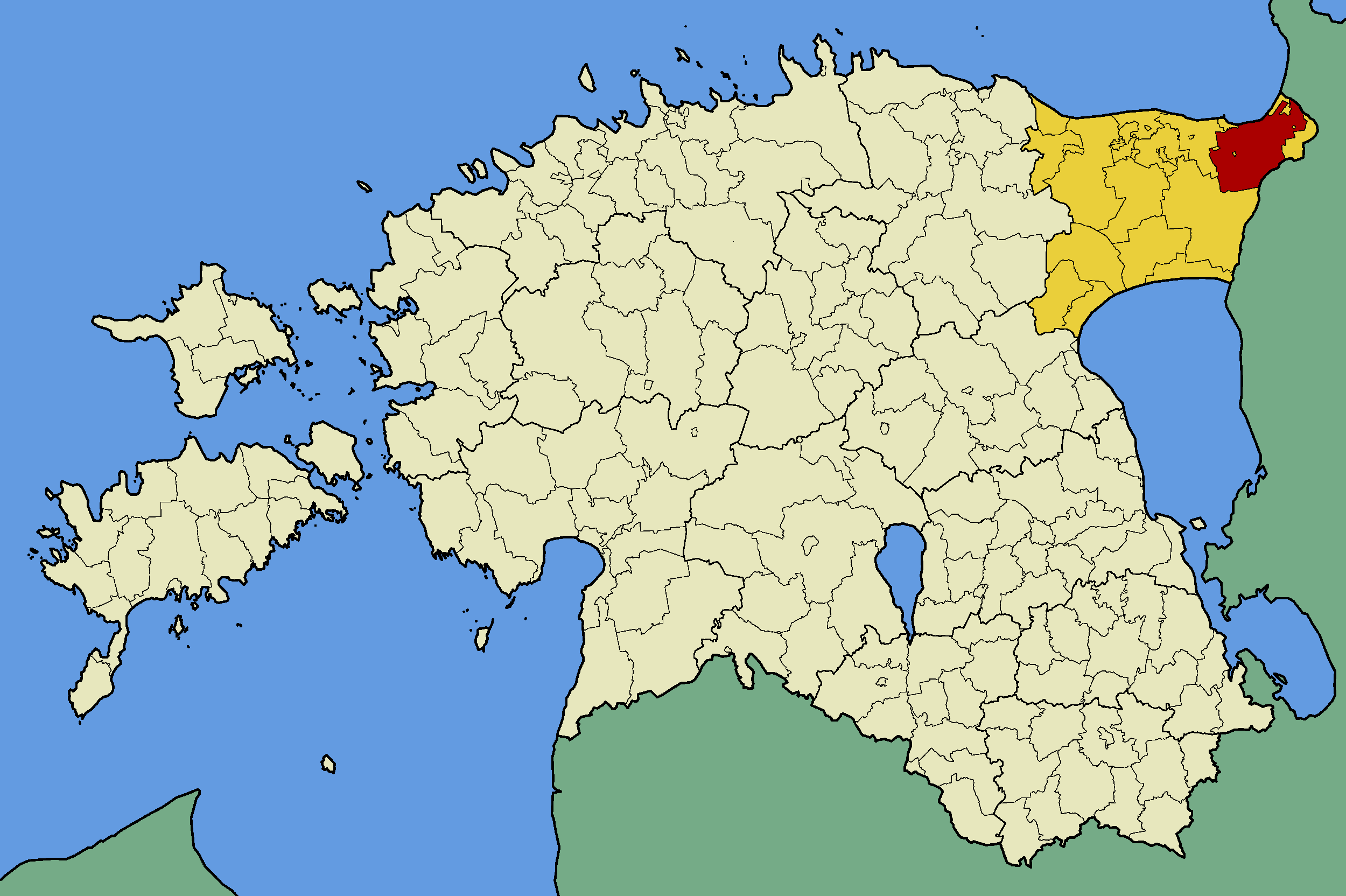
- Vaivara Parish within Ida-Viru County.
- Country: Estonia
- County: Ida-Viru County
- Administrative centre: Sinimäe

Area
  - Total: 397.97 km^{2} (153.66 sq mi)

Population (2008)
  - Total: 1,800
  - Density: 4.5/km^{2} (12/sq mi)
- Website: www.vaivara.ee

Vaivara Parish is a former municipality of Ida-Viru County in northern Estonia. It had a population of 1,800 (2008) and an area of 397.97 km². Vaivara Parish was abolished in 2017 and its territory became a part of Narva-Jõesuu.

== Settlements ==
Small boroughs

Olgina (552 inhabitants), Sinimäe (430 inhabitants)

Villages

Arumäe, Auvere, Hiiemetsa, Hundinurga, Laagna, Kudruküla, Meriküla, Mustanina, Peeterristi, Perjatsi, Pimestiku, Puhkova, Soldina, Sõtke, Tõrvajõe, Udria, Vaivara, Vodava

== See also ==
- Blue Mountains
- Battle of Narva - Battle of the Tannenbergstellung (1944)
- Vaivara concentration camp
- Sirgala training area
