= Narva Airfield =

Airfield in Narva, Estonia

Coordinates: 59°23′22″N 028°06′41″E

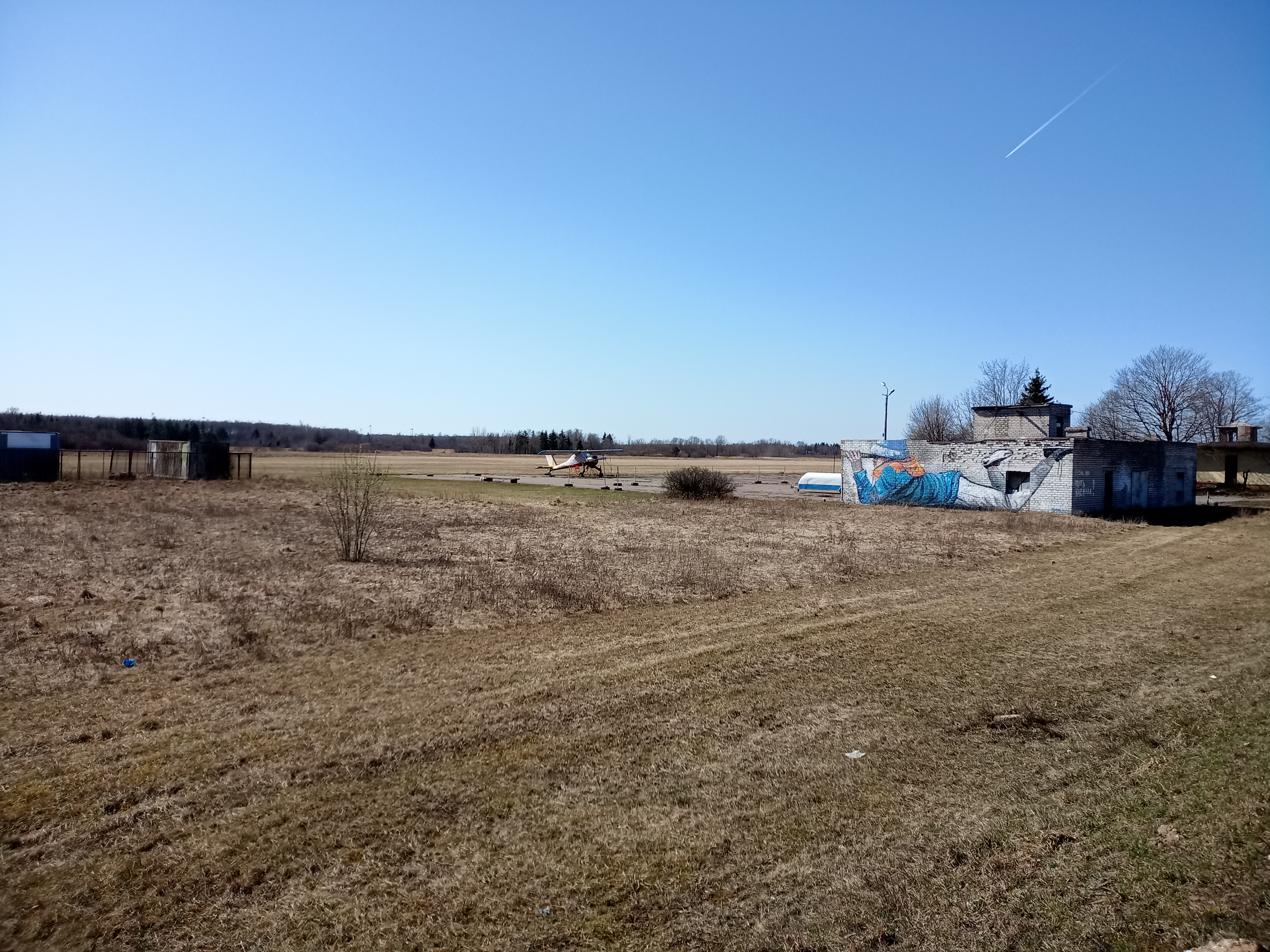
Narva Airfield

Narva Airfield is an airfield in Estonia, located in the town of Soldina just outside the town of Narva. It is Estonia's easternmost airfield, very close to the border with Russia, at its closest only 3.5 kilometers to the northeast. The airfield is covered by grass, and is mainly used for skydiving. It is located just 190 kilometers east of Tallinn, the capital of Estonia.
