= Narva-Jõesuu (urban municipality) =

Municipality of Estonia

Narva-Jõesuu Estonian: Narva-Jõesuu linn
- Municipality of Estonia
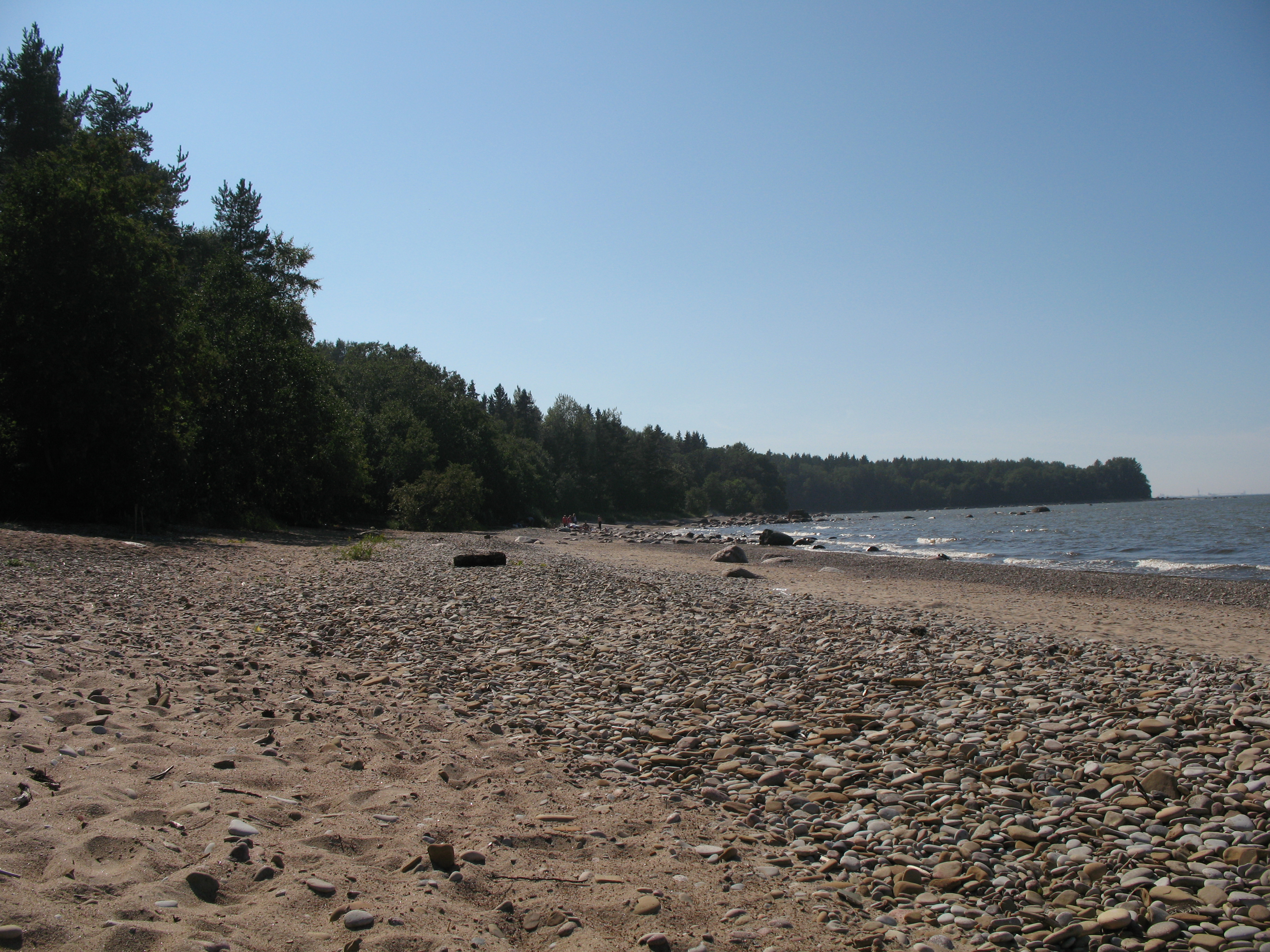

- Flag Coat of arms

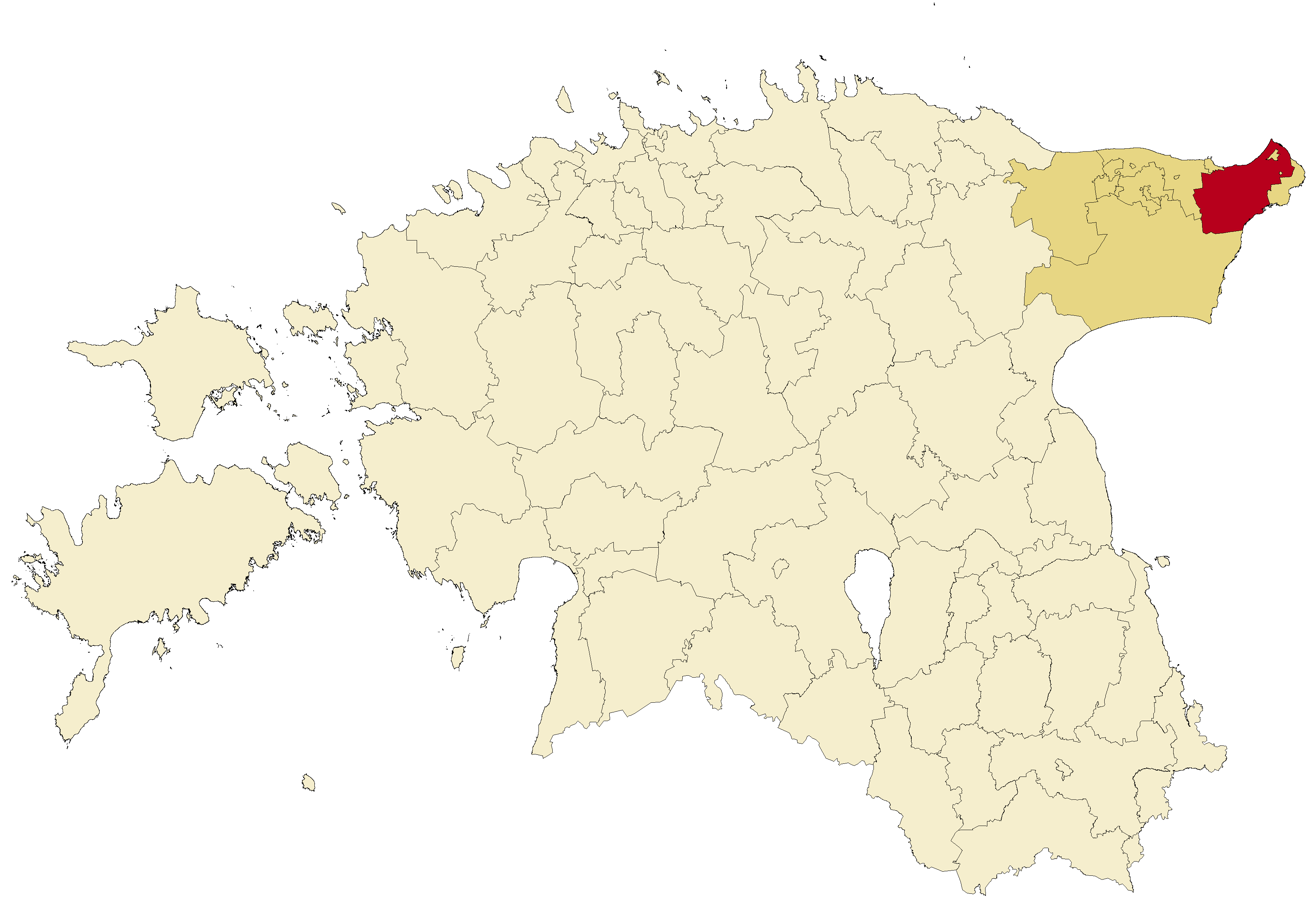
- Country: Estonia
- County: Ida-Viru County
- Administrative centre: Narva-Jõesuu

Government
  - Mayor: Maksim Iljin

Area
  - Total: 405 km^{2} (156 sq mi)

Population (01.01.2019)
  - Total: 4,429
  - Density: 10.9/km^{2} (28.3/sq mi)
- ISO 3166 code: EE-514
- Website: Official website

Narva-Jõesuu (Estonian: Narva-Jõesuu linn) is an urban municipality of Estonia, in Ida-Viru County. It comprises the town of Narva-Jõesuu, settlements of the former parish of Vaivara, and two former distant exclaves (the oil shale mining settlements Sirgala and Viivikonna) of the urban municipality of Kohtla-Järve. The municipality surrounds two exclave neighbourhoods (dacha districts) of the city of Narva, Olgina and Kudruküla, both of which share their names with an adjacent village in Narva-Jõesuu municipality.

== Settlements ==
town

- Narva-Jõesuu

boroughs

- Sinimäe – Olgina

villages

- Arumäe – Auvere – Hiiemetsa – Hundinurga – Laagna – Kudruküla – Meriküla – Mustanina – Peeterristi – Perjatsi – Pimestiku – Puhkova – Sirgala – Soldina – Sõtke– Tõrvajõe – Udria – Vaivara – Viivikonna – Vodava.

== Symbols ==
Narva-Jõesuu's flag and coat of arms were designed and approved in the mid-1990s by the chairman of the local government Pavel Grigorjev. The gold strips of land on the image symbolise Estonian and Russian coasts on both sides along the Narva River and the blue area symbolises its iconic mouth.

== Twinnings ==
- Billund Municipality, Denmark
- Imatra, Finland
- Kronstadt, Russia
