= Sinimäe =

Borough in Estonia

Coordinates: 59°22′N 27°52′E

- Small borough
- Interactive map of Sinimäe
- Country: Estonia
- County: Ida-Viru County
- Municipality: Narva-Jõesuu

Population (2011 Census)
  - Total: 319
- Time zone: UTC+2 (EET)
  - Summer (DST): UTC+3 (EEST)

Sinimäe is a small borough in Narva-Jõesuu municipality, Ida-Viru County in northeastern Estonia. At the 2011 Census, the settlement's population was 319, of which the Estonians were 100 (31.3%). Prior to the 2017 administrative reform of local governments, it was located in Vaivara Parish.

Before 1977, Sinimäe was regarded as a village.

In September 1944, the village was destroyed during a fierce battle between the Red Army and its opponents including Wehrmacht and Waffen-SS troops.

== See also ==
- Sinimäed Hills
- Battle of Tannenberg Line
