= Vaivara concentration camp =

Nazi concentration camp for Jews in Estonia during World War II

Coordinates: 59°22′02″N 27°45′47″E

Vaivara
- Concentration camp
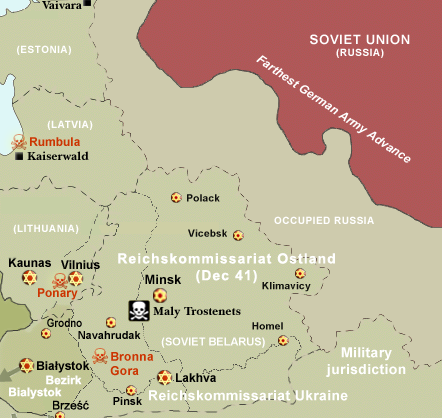
- Concentration camps in Reichskommissariat Ostland. The concentration camps are marked with a black square.

- Location within Estonia
- Location: Vaivara, Estonia
- Operated by: Estonian auxiliaries of Nazi Germany
- Commandant: Hans Aumeier (until Nov. 1943); Helmut Schnabel
- Operational: August 1943 – 5 February 1944
- Inmates: Jews, mostly Lithuanian Jews
- Number of inmates: 20,000
- Killed: More than 1,000

Vaivara was the centre of a large concentration camp-complex consisting of 22 concentration and labor camps established in occupied Estonia by the Nazi regime during World War II. Vaivara lies 30 km west of Narva close to the Russian border. Some 20,000 Jewish prisoners passed through its gates. Around 9,000 Jews were transported there from the Vilna and from the Kaunas and Kovno Ghettos. Various groups of Jewish prisoners were 'transported' to Vaivara and its surrounding workcamps from Latvia, Poland and Hungary. German and Czech Jews from the Theresienstadt concentration camp also arrived there. Vaivara was one of the last concentration camps established. It existed from August 1943 to February 1944.

== Creation ==
On 21 June 1943, following a secret decree to all his SS and police subordinates, RFSS Heinrich Himmler ordered the liquidation of the remaining ghettos in the Baltic states. Subsequently, the German occupation authorities met under the auspices of the Commander of the Security Police and SD in Reval (the German name for the Estonian capital Tallinn) to plan the establishment of forced labor camps for the oil-shale extraction operations of Baltöl, an IG Farben subsidiary.

Beginning in August 1943, a series of concentration camps was established all over Estonia by Organisation Todt (OT). The administrative center of the camp-complex was in Vaivara. SS-Hauptsturmbannführer Hans Aumeier (1906–1948), a former camp commander of Auschwitz, was placed in charge. The administrative staff was headed by Otto Brenneis who was assisted by SS-Hauptsturmbannführer (Hstf.) Max Dahlmann, Hstf. Kurt Pannicke and Helmut Schnabel. Dr.Franz von Bodmann, responsible for the deplorable health of the prisoners, was employed as the camp's surgeon. He was later replaced by Dr. Eduard Krebsbach (1894–1947).

Both doctors in spite of the oath of their medical profession were present at regular 'selections' undertaken by the camp commandant Aumeier. An estimated 500 men, women and children were randdomly shot as a result. During their time at the camp von Bodmann and then Krebsbach became explicitly involved in the process of murder. Aumeier was particularly fond of beating women. As a sadist he took delight in his murderous rapture. Occasionally he delegated responsibility to his subordinates. Altogether only 15 Germans served in the camp. Most of the guards were Estonian and Russian auxiliaries of the 287th and 290th Security Battalions (Schutzmannschaftsbataillone).

The camp was established in the beginning of August 1943 near the Vaivara train station. It served as the main camp (Hauptlager) and had within its orbit 20 forced labor camps (Außenlager) scattered throughout Estonia. Some of these existed only briefly (like Soski), but all of them together were commonly referred to as the Vaivara [concentration] camp-complex. Curiously, however, all external and internal reports were written and sent under the seemingly harmless field-post number 58 969. This suggests how there was something to hide. The extreme barbarity of the whole camp-complex was seemingly disarmed by such bureaucratic references which perhaps enabled some of the perpetrators to manage their conscience.

The Vaivara camp-complex was no less barbaric than any other concentration camp and forced labour camp. It epitomised Himmler's personal dictum of 'Vernichtung durch Arbeit' ('Extermination through Work'). Under the auspices of slave-labour it was decreed how maximum output was to be achieved through the exhaustion and decimation of the workforce.

To the pragmatic technocrats attached to 'Baltische Öl GmbH' ('Baltöl') this made no sense. But from the perspective of the SS it was just necessary to keep alive a nucleus of workers ('the fittest among the weakest'). The rest of the workforce which came in droves through new replacements was expendable. They worked and died and so fulfilled the Nazi criteria of the 'Final Solution.'

== Satellite Camps ==
At first the camp-complex was run by the OT, but after a few weeks Kurt Pannicke took over. When Pannicke took over the Narva subcamp at the end of September, Helmut Schnabel became its commander. One of the most important satellite camps was located in Kiviöli (in Estonian: Kiviõli), an industrial centre 55 km west of Vaivara. There the slave workers had to work within the refinery and other installations of the major oil company, the aforementioned 'Baltöl.'

Another substantial satellite camp was established at Goldfields, the name of which originated from British entrepreneurs during the 19. Century. They had set up a huge factory complex near the industrial settlement of Kohtla which lies 40 km west of Vaivara. During the German occupation Goldfields was taken over by Baltöl. The company employed 1200 slave labourers in skilled and in menial tasks.

Among the satellite camps was also the subcamp of Soski, which lies 60 km south of Vaivara. The camp lay in a wooded area and marshland. There were around 500 slave labourers. Between October 1943 and February 1944 they had to unload the barges from the nearby river Narva and also had to busy themselves with the construction of a small-gauge railway as well as being involved in the demands of oil-shale extraction.

== Death-Rate ==
According to the monthly report of SS Lagerarzt Dr. Eduard Krebsbach, written in February 1944, there were 200 deaths in the Vaivara camp-complex. This figure was in keeping with the average death-rate. He numbers the total employment of slave labourers, including that of women, as 8,210. His job was to monitor the treatment ('Behandlung') of unhealthy prisoners unable to work. He registers those in the makeshift camp hospital, numbering 3,394 cases. His principal task is to limit the outbreak of contagion like Typhus which the Germans particularly feared since they didn't want the consequence of any outbreak affecting them. With pride Krebsbach writes how there are only 3 cases with scarlet fever and one with typhus. Of course, he overlooks and manipulates figures so as to disguise the number of those shot whose crime had been to be too ill!

Krebsbach was no better than his predecessor Dr. Franz von Bodmann, who led a harsh regime. Notably, Kresbach saw slave labourers as mere statistics. His job was to juggle with numbers and to project to his superiors in the camp-complex within a state of efficiency. He is also responsible for his departmental superior SS-Dr. Enno Lolling (1888–1945), head of Amt DIII of the WVHA in Berlin.

How obscenely distant that was from the truth. Children, for instance, had no role to play in the employment schemes of the SS. All children were shot and dumped in graves in the surrounding woods. Old people, usually the grandparents of the children, were shot too. Only some juveniles able to show their strength were permitted to join the workforce.

Krebsbach actually complains about the increase in mortality throughout the camp-complex. It is absurd how he pretends to keep a 'healthy' picture of the camp when work conditions and the poor distribution of meagre rations aim to undermine the workforce. It is as if he blames the victims themselves for dying as he tries to maintain his image of perfect statistics.

== Mass-Murder & War Crimes ==
At the end of February 1944 the situation on the Eastern Front drastically changed for the Germans as the Red Army, having lifted the siege of Leningrad in January, felt strong enough to launch a major offensive in the Baltic region. Alarm bells signalled the unpreparedness of the Germans who hastily began to arrange the evacuation of the Vaivara camp-complex.

In his monthly report for February 1944 Krebsbach writes how the situation at the front as a result of the Soviet breakthrough has radically altered. As the main camp in Vaivara is about to be cleared he mentions how 604 prisoners unable to work and 185 juveniles and children are to be loaded into trucks and driven away. Responsible for the operation is SS-Oberscharführer Heinrich Schattkus (*1898-). Their fate cannot be substantiated but the assumption is that they were taken away to be murdered.

The official Nazi positioning regarding the Vaivara workforce was that it had to be evacuated before the advancing Red Army had a chance to discover the reality of the work-complex. Until this time during WWII no concentration camp and workcamp had been liberated. The Nazis wanted to evacuate the slave labourers for they still saw in them a useful workforce for other tasks.

Hence, in autumn 1944, thousands of slave labourers were evacuated from the Vaivara camp-complex. This was in accordance with a general directive given to SS-police subordinates by RFSS Heinrich Himmler on 17 June 1944 in which he states how necessary it has become to 'evacuate' the concentration camps in the occupied East. The Vaivara enforced labourers were brought to the Estonian coastal port of Klooga and from there sent on by sea to the Stutthof concentration camp which lies just outside of Danzig.

There was a particular descrepency about Himmler's directive since there was a paradox characterizing Nazi policy. They found slave labourers useful for the German war economy and yet encouraged Vernichtung durch Arbeit ('Extermination through Work'). The Nazis wanted to clear away evidence of their war crimes in the concentration camps and labour camps. Yet they were careless enough to massacre those they couldn't evacuate in time.

As a demonstration of their bloodlust the 20th Grenadier Division of the Waffen-SS, supported by a police unit from the Sicherheitspolizei in Reval, massacred on 19 September 1944 2,000 Jewish slave labourers in the woods just outside the Estonian port of Klooga. The advancing Red Army discovered the crime and photographed piles of corpses as evidence of Nazi barbarity and of the perverted sickness with which the Nazis slaughtered innocent people.

== A Witness-Account ==
Margit Adler (*1924-), a young woman originally from the Jewish community of Kalotanádas in the Hungarian-occupied part of Romania, was one of the many thousands of women that were shipped to Stutthof. They were crammed into the hulk of a freighter in appalling conditions. Many died while others cried out in thirst and hunger. Margit reports how they were at first given 2 kg of bread, a little cheese and salami. The journey by sea lasted 6 days. In horrendous conditions the women were so crammed that they had to stand and endure for as long as they could.

Upon their arrival in Stutthof the women from Vaivara had to stand for hours in the roll-call area (Appelleplatz). Margit describes how they were guarded by SS-auxiliaries from the Ukraine. For no reason, she explains, their overseers beat them mercilessly. The women spent two weeks in Stutthof. Then they were divided up and a number of them, including Margit, was sent to Bromberg-Ost.

There a satellite workcamp (Außenlager) awaited them. 300 Jewish women had already been brought there from Kaunas and Riga. Together with them the 'Vaivara Women' had to work for Die Deutsche Reichsbahn ('German state railways') and lay down new rails which was back-breaking work. Their only consolation was to daily receive 400g of bread and thick soup. Twice a week there was jam or cheese.

Margit Adler's fate remains unknown. As one of the few women to have survived the 'Evacuation' of the Vaivara camp-complex she was able with the help of a post-war Jewish Committee to return home. But there was no one left alive from her family. Her parents Mózes and Lea Adler, her siblings Samu and Ferenc Adler, the latter's wife Sári Paszternák and her children Margit and Helên Adler (born respectively in 1938 and 1940) had all perished.

The fate of most of the Vaivara slave labourers remains unclear. The 1,290 women who found themselves in Bromberg-Ost were route-marched on foot to Sachsenhausen Concentration Camp. Margit Adler and a few others managed to slip away to be liberated by the Red Army. Other slave labourers from Vaivara were distributed throughout the satellite camps of the Natzweiler-Struthof concentration camp until they could be freed by the Western Allies.

== Conditions and Prisoners ==
Although the main purpose of the Vaivara camp-complex was to fully exploit the work capacity of its slave labourers, the random selections and executions carried out by the camp commandant Aumeier as well as the deliberate killing off of ill workers reveals the paradox behind Nazi policy. Himmler's dictum of Vernichtung durch Arbeit ('Extermination through Work') lent sadistic pleasure to the false Nazi promise of Arbeit macht Frei ('Work makes you Free').

The illogicality of the whole Nazi perception of work even led to the killing of skilled labour during the last phase of the Vaivara camp-complex. It was true how until then a nucleus of able-bodied workers were able to survive but the turnover of those unable to keep pace with the demands of work kept the camp-complex at around 8–9,000. Hence, new arrivals from the dissolved Ghettos like Vilna and Kaunas would always fill the place of those dying and too weak to continue working.

The miserable conditions particularly in winter compounded by inadequate food and a lack of winter clothing contributed to a consistently high mortality rate among the prisoners. However, another paradox of Nazi policy was the administrative attempt to achieve a clean and illness-free environment while simultaneously through heavy labour and poor rations encouraging the conditions for sickness.

Out of a recorded census of 8,210 labourers in February 1944 1,928 required light treatment to regain fitness while 3,394 were registered in the makeshift hospital. The February figures also reveal that 200 were acknowledged as dead through execution or selection. But the idea of a clean and functioning hospital was a myth based on the manipulation of statistics. If around 3,000 couldn't work they would according to Nazi reasoning have to pay for their inactivity. Hence, it is of no surprise how by June 1944 as a result of executions, illness and forced marches the population of the camp-complex slipped down close to around 6,000.

The massacre at Klooga of 2,000 Jewish slave labourers on 19 September 1944, including those with skilled labour and a modicum of health, reveals the banality of Nazi policy. If the intention was to evacuate Vaivara and its satellite environs and to leave behind no evidence of crimes against humanity it seems the Nazis did the very opposite and massacred people out of spite.

The Red Army's arrival in the late summer and early autumn of 1944 verified the large-scale killing of the able bodied prisoners. Soviet photo-journalists documented the mass graves and pyres of heaped up dead throughout the Vaivara main camp and satellite camps. In Soski, for instance, mass graves were discovered in the nearby forest and close to the quarry that had been furrowed out in conjunction with the efforts at oil shale extraction.

Those prisoners too old or too sick to work had been killed in Selektionen (selections) or were taken away in trucks in large numbers to be murdered in the woods. In this way all the children had been disposed of. The first such selection took place in the autumn of 1943, when 150 Jewish men and women were shot in the nearby woods. A second selection eliminated 300 Jews, most of them suffering from typhoid fever. The Germans themselves were paranoid about getting infected. It suited them to see Jews as carriers of contagion as long as they were isolated in the makeshift camp hospital or were taken away and shot.

In twenty more selections, approximately 500 more Jewish prisoners were killed, including another group of children. Therefore, it was no surprise how the population of the camp-complex ultimately slipped close to 6,000 by June 1944. SS-Dr. Franz von Bodmann's administrative reports, describing the camp population as a whole reveals the number of slave workers to be at 6,982 in October 1943, 9,207 in November 1943, 8,210 in February 1944 and 6,662 in June 1944. His colleague SS-Dr. Eduard Krebsbach reaffirmed the February figures.

In December 1943, a typhoid epidemic broke out in Vaivara and the satellite camps, resulting in the deaths of 20 per cent of the overall camp population. But the figures were temporarily made up through new arrivals. Himmler had left the evacuation of the workcamps in the East up to the decision-making of local commandants. But just before the infamous massacre in Klooga occurred on 19 September 1944 the Vaivara camp commandant Aumeier and his entire personal entourage hurriedly boarded a ship and left all their chaos and evidence of mass-murder behind them.

== Evacuation ==
With the front coming closer in early 1944, the Vaivara camp was evacuated. This occurred in stages from around 4 and 5 February 1944 up until the highpoint of the summer. A total of 2,466 inmates were marched to the camps at Kiviõli (46 kilometres (29 mi)), Ereda (30 kilometres (19 mi)), Jõhvi (20 kilometres (12 mi)) and Goldfields (30 kilometres (19 mi)). The inmates had to walk for three days in bad winter weather with poor clothing, footwear and food. The columns were also attacked by Soviet aircraft.

In July 1944, SS-Dr. Franz von Bodmann held a strict selection, known as the Ten Percent Selection, when one in ten of the inmates was selected and shot near Ereda which lies 40 km west of Vaivara. There had been a satellite camp ('Außenlager') situated there since October 1943. 750 slave workers were registered. In August and September the whole camp along with other satellite camps at Auvere (15 km south-west of Vaivara), Putki (20 km south of Vaivara) and Viivikonna (5 km south-east of Vaivara) were evacuated. Vaivara itself saw the end to its camp amidst chaos, selections, executions and death marches. Such was the disorder as the Germans prepared the complete evacuation of Estonia. The majority of the inmates were sent west. As there were not enough ships, they crowded into the camps of Klooga and Lagedi. There then followed on 19 September 1944 the massacre of about 2,000 inmates of the overcrowded Klooga camp. After the victims were executed their corpses were burned on pyres. Similar mass executions took place at Lagedi.

== Aftermath ==
The commandant of Vaivara SS-Hauptsturmführer Hans Aumeier was tried at the Auschwitz trial in Poland in 1947. He was executed on 24 January 1948. SS-Dr Eduard Krebsbach (1894–1947), who had participated like his predecessor SS-Dr. Franz von Bodmann in various selections, was brought to trial. He was found guilty of his crimes and was hanged in 1947.

In 1951, the Soviets tried a number of Estonian auxiliaries. Brenneis was killed at the end of the war. Von Bodmann escaped the hangman's noose and committed suicide in May 1945. Pannicke disappeared after the war as did Heinrich Schattkus (*1898-) of whom there was no further trace. Another perpetrator Karl Theiner (1914–1955) had an inferior position responsible for camp sanitation. He maintained his low rank ('Sanitätsdienstgrad') but compensated himself in Vaivara through examples of excessive violence against male and female prisoners many of whom he murdered. In 1955 a DDR court found him guilty and he was sentenced to death.

In West-Germany sentences could be more lenient. For instance, Schnabel was sentenced in the BRD to 16 years imprisonment in 1968, which was reduced to 6 years in 1969. However, he was given a life sentence after another trial in 1977. Others were indicted but never tried by German courts.

== List of Satellite camps ==
Satellite camps of Vaivara concentration camp were located in:

- Aseri
- Auvere
- Ereda, with branches in Goldfields (now Kohtla and Kohtla shale oil factory) and Kohtla-Nõmme.
- Hungerburg (now Narva-Jõesuu)
- Ilinurme (either in Ilistvere or Illuka)
- Jägala
- Jõhvi
- Kerstovo (now in Opolye volost, Kingiseppsky District, Leningrad Oblast, Russia)
- Kiviõli
- Klooga, with branches in Laoküla and Paldiski.
- Kūdupe (in northern Latvia)
- Kukruse
- Kunda
- Kuremäe
- Lagedi (two transportation camps from July to August and from August to September.)
- Narva (according to Eugenie Gurin-Loov the site is located in nowadays Russia.)
- Pankjavitsa (various spellings), now Panikovichi, Russia
- Petseri
- Putki (in Kose Parish, Viru County)
- Saka
- Sonda
- Soska (near the Agusalu Lake, 1.5 km east of Agusalu)
- Ülenurme
- Viivikonna

== See also ==
- List of Nazi concentration camps
