= Ereda =

Village in Estonia

Coordinates: 59°19′N 27°14′E

- Village
- Interactive map of Ereda
- Country: Estonia
- County: Ida-Viru County
- Parish: Alutaguse Parish
- Time zone: UTC+2 (EET)
  - Summer (DST): UTC+3 (EEST)

Ereda (German: Errides) is a village in Alutaguse Parish, Ida-Viru County in northeastern Estonia. Prior to the 2017 administrative reform of local governments, it was located in Mäetaguse Parish.

During the German occupation in World War II, a Nazi labor camp was located there as a satellite camp of the Vaivara concentration camp.

== See also ==
- Inge Sylten and Heinz Drosihn, an article about an inmate and commandant of the Ereda concentration camp in Estonia
