= Tõrvajõe =

Village in Estonia

Coordinates: 59°24′N 28°04′E

- Village
- Interactive map of Tõrvajõe
- Country: Estonia
- County: Ida-Viru County
- Municipality: Narva-Jõesuu
- Time zone: UTC+2 (EET)
  - Summer (DST): UTC+3 (EEST)

Tõrvajõe is a village in Narva-Jõesuu municipality, Ida-Viru County in northeastern Estonia. Prior to the 2017 administrative reform of local governments, it was located in Vaivara Parish.
