= Franz von Bodmann =

SS officer (1908–1945)

Franz Hermann Johann Maria Freiherr von Bodmann, sometimes written as Bodman (born 23 March 1908 in Zwiefaltendorf – died 25 May 1945 in Altenmarkt im Pongau) was a German SS-Obersturmführer who served as a camp physician in several Nazi concentration camps.

Von Bodmann joined the Nazi Party in May 1932 (membership number 1,098,482) and the SS itself in 1934 (member number 267,787). From October 1939 to June 1940 and from July 1941 to January 1942 he served with the 79th SS-Standarte in Ulm in the Second Bataillon as a physician. It was 1941 that he was promoted to the rank of Obersturmführer.

Von Bodmann was appointed camp physician at Auschwitz concentration camp in February 1942 and the following year held a similar position at Majdanek concentration camp. He subsequently filled the same role at Natzweiler-Struthof concentration camp and from September 1943 at Vaivara concentration camp. At some point he also worked at Neuengamme concentration camp although the exact dates are unknown. Eyewitnesses claimed that at Auschwitz von Bodmann killed inmates personally by injecting Phenol into their veins and also stated that he carried out similar procedures at other camps. Von Bodmann's departure from Auschwitz, where he had no superiors and as such acted largely as he pleased, was hastened when he contracted typhus not long after arriving.

He left the camps in September 1944 when he was sent to work for SS-Wirtschafts-Verwaltungshauptamt and then to the Hauptamt Volksdeutsche Mittelstelle. His final assignment was as troop physician to the 5th SS Panzer Division Wiking.

He was taken as a prisoner of war and held in a military hospital at a British internment camp where he killed himself just after the end of the Second World War.
