= Auvere =

Village in Estonia

Coordinates: 59°21′N 27°56′E

- Village
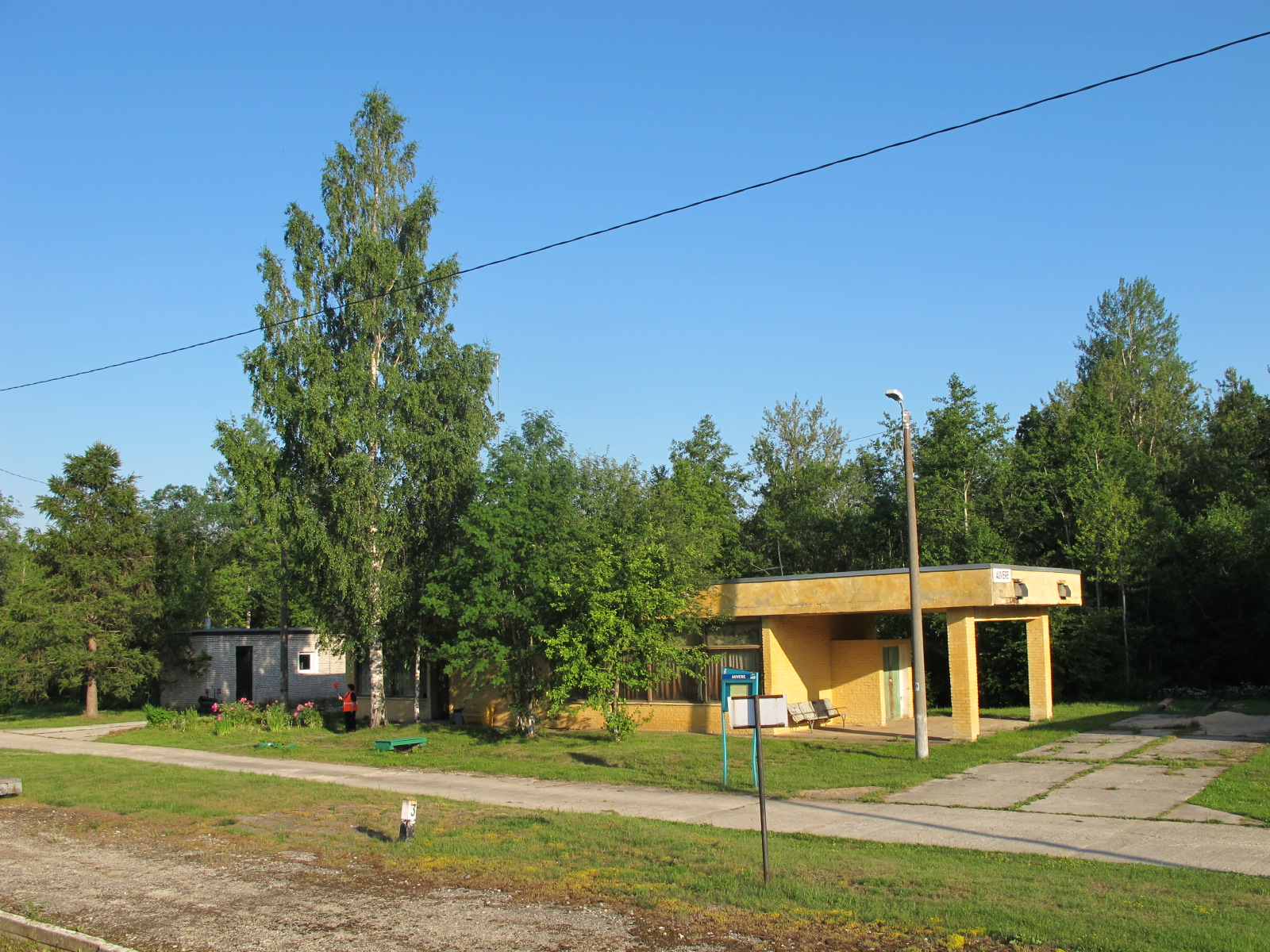
- Auvere railway station
- Interactive map of Auvere
- Country: Estonia
- County: Ida-Viru County
- Municipality: Narva-Jõesuu
- Time zone: UTC+2 (EET)
  - Summer (DST): UTC+3 (EEST)

Auvere (German: Ampfer) is a village in Narva-Jõesuu municipality, Ida-Viru County in northeastern Estonia. Prior to the 2017 administrative reform of local governments, it was located in Vaivara Parish.

== See also ==
- Battle of Auvere

Preceding station	Elron	Following station
Vaivara towards Tallinn	Tallinn–Narva	Soldina towards Narva
