= Hans Aumeier =

German SS officer (1906–1948)

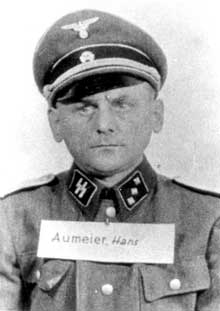
- Born: 20 August 1906; Amberg, Kingdom of Bavaria, German Empire
- Died: 24 January 1948 (aged 41); Montelupich Prison, Kraków, Polish People's Republic
- Known for: Commandant of Vaivara concentration camp Deputy commandant of Auschwitz concentration camp
- Political party: Nazi Party
- Status: Executed by hanging
- Motive: Nazism
- Conviction: Crimes against humanity
- Trial: Auschwitz trial
- Penalty: Death

Hans Aumeier (20 August 1906 – 24 January 1948) was an SS commander during the Nazi era who was the commandant of Vaivara concentration camp and the deputy commandant of Auschwitz concentration camp. One of the most important criminals at Auschwitz, Aumeier was extradited to Poland, where he was convicted and sentenced to death. He was executed in 1948.

== Life before the war ==
Aumeier was born on 20 August 1906 in the small town of Amberg, Germany, where he attended elementary school for four years and then secondary school for just three years. In 1918, he left school without any qualifications to take up an apprenticeship as a turner and fitter in a local rifle factory, following his father's career. In 1923, Aumeier left the small factory in Amberg and began work for a bigger company in Munich. In 1925, he tried to join the Reichswehr, but failed and returned to the rifle factory in Munich, but could not settle down, and after taking up similar positions in other factories in Berlin, Bremen and Cologne he became unemployed. Throughout the period 1926 to 1929, Aumeier moved from one job to another, taking part-time work and summer jobs in order to survive. He was an early member of the Nazi Party, joining in December 1929, and in 1931 he joined the SA and was soon employed as a driver at the SA headquarters in Berlin. In December 1931, Aumeier was transferred to the SS, where he worked in the garage as a driver and was on the staff of head of the SS, Heinrich Himmler.

== Auschwitz atrocities ==
On 1 February 1942, Aumeier was transferred to Auschwitz concentration camp and was appointed head of Department III, and named Schutzhaftlagerführer at Auschwitz I, where he remained until 16 August 1943. It was during this time at Auschwitz that Aumeier made a name for himself, responsible for many draconian methods, including torture, beatings, and executions. On 19 March 1942, 144 women were shot at the execution wall in the courtyard of Blocks 10 and 11 on Aumeier's orders. On 27 May 1942, he was present again at a mass execution of 168 prisoners who were shot in the same manner.

=== Corruption ===
On 18 August 1943, Aumeier was found guilty of corrupt practices and theft of gold from the victims of gassing, and as a result, was transferred from Auschwitz on the personal orders of Commandant Rudolf Höß. According to an interrogation report, Aumeier stated that in May–June 1943 while still attached to Auschwitz he was ordered to report to the Higher SS and Police Leader “Ostland”, SS-Obergruppenführer Friedrich Jeckeln. He was attached to the SS-Construction Brigade of 5th SS Panzer Corps; this unit was responsible for building fortifications in the area Oranienbaum-Leningrad and was under the command of Organisation Todt. Aumeier would command a Jewish construction unit of some 7,000 men with orders to construct, and then establish Vaivara concentration camp in Estonia for Jews.

== Life after Auschwitz ==
Aumeier on trial at the Supreme National Tribunal, Kraków, Poland, 1947

After he was discharged from Auschwitz, Aumeier returned to Vaivara as commandant and remained there until August 1944, when the camp was evacuated and all his prisoners were made the responsibility of the commandant of Stutthof concentration camp. On 20 August Aumeier reported back to Jeckeln and found himself attached to a Police Battalion part of "Kampfgruppe (Battle Group) Jeckeln", situated near Riga, Latvia. Here, Aumeier took part in his only frontline engagement with the enemy as his unit attempted to attack the Estonian island of Osel (Saaremaa) but was unsuccessful. What part he played in this attack is unclear.

In October 1944, shortly before the surrender of Riga, Aumeier was ordered to report to SS-Gruppenführer Richard Glücks at Oranienburg. He took this opportunity to ask Glücks if he could return to his old unit at Dachau concentration camp so he could visit his family. His request was granted, but he was taken ill with an old eye injury and was sent to the hospital; he remained there until January 1945. When Aumeier was finally discharged, he reported back to Oranienburg and was asked whether he wanted to go to occupied Norway to become commandant of a new concentration camp at Mysen. He asked for leave to see his family, but this time it was refused and he was told to report to SS-Sturmbannführer Max Pauly immediately who would brief him.

On 22 January Aumeier arrived in Oslo, met Pauly and was told he had to supervise the building of a camp to house approximately 3,000 prisoners to be used in slave labour. It seems that Aumeier managed to build this camp and his treatment of the prisoners was very different from that of how he treated the prisoners at Auschwitz. He worked closely with the Norwegian Red Cross and even let them into the camp. On 7 May 1945, Aumeier opened the camp and let the prisoners go free; by the next day the camp was empty.

== Trial and conviction ==
On 11 June 1945 Aumeier was arrested at Terningmoen camp as a result of information gleaned from Gestapo files obtained by the MI6. He was still in full SS uniform and admitted almost immediately his name and rank. He was handed over to United States intelligence officers at Akershus Prison for interrogation in August 1945. In 1946, he was extradited to Poland to face trial as a war criminal along with thirty-nine other members of the SS staff of Auschwitz-Birkenau, before the Supreme National Tribunal in Kraków. The trial lasted from 25 November to 16 December 1947, and Aumeier stated that if he was found guilty and sentenced to death, he would "die as a 'Sündenbock' (scapegoat) for Germany". He told the court that he had never killed anyone at Auschwitz and neither had any of his men and denied knowledge of the gas chambers. On 22 December Aumeier was sentenced to death, and he was hanged on 24 January 1948 in Montelupich Prison, Kraków.

== Sources ==
- Jeremy Dixon, Commanders of Auschwitz: The SS Officers who ran the Largest Nazi Concentration Camp 1940–1945, Schiffer Military History: Atglen, PA, 2005, ISBN 0-7643-2175-7
