= Udria =

Village in Estonia

- Village
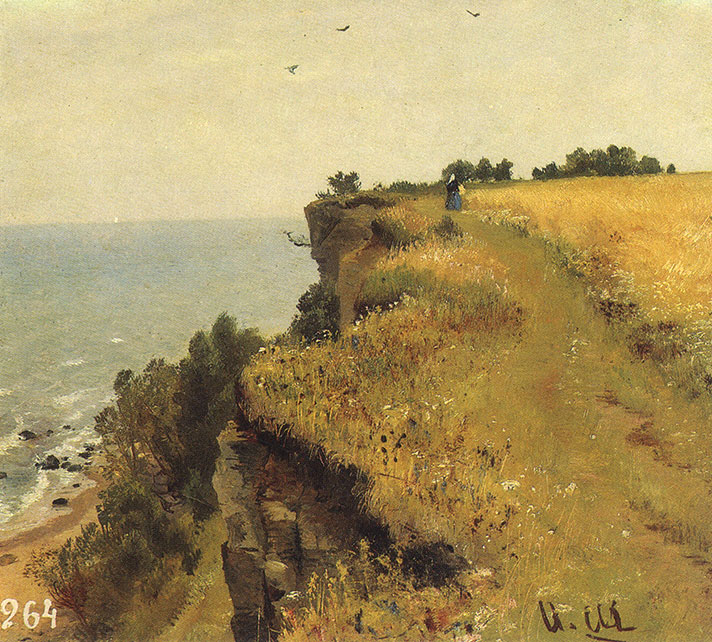

- Location within Estonia
- Coordinates: 59°24′N 27°55′E
- Country: Estonia
- County: Ida-Viru County
- Municipality: Narva-Jõesuu
- Time zone: UTC+2 (EET)
  - Summer (DST): UTC+3 (EEST)

Udria is a village in Narva-Jõesuu municipality, Ida-Viru County in northeastern Estonia. Prior to the 2017 administrative reform of local governments, it was located in Vaivara Parish. There is a large wind farm in Udria.

== See also ==
- Battle of Utria
