= Sirgala training area =

Military training area in Estonia

Sirgala harjutusväli Sirgala training area
- Near Sillamäe, Jõhvi and Narva in Estonia

Site information
- Type: military training area
- Operator: Estonian Defence Forces
- Status: active

Location
- Coordinates: 59°17′N 27°45′E
- Area: 3,000 ha (7,400 acres)

Site history
- In use: 2008

Sirgala training area is one of the six military training fields used by the Estonian Defence Forces. It is located in Mustanina village, Narva-Jõesuu municipality, Ida-Viru County in northeastern Estonia, and covers approximately 3,000 ha (7,400 acres).

== Establishment ==
The training area is a reforested oil-shale mining area, which is largely administered by the State Forest Management Center. Sirgala training area was established on 12 June 2008, with Government Order No. 272 "Establishment of the Defense Forces Sirgala training area."

== See also ==
- Keskpolügoon
