= Kontinentale Öl =

Kontinentale Öl AG ("Continental Oil share company;" Konti Öl) was a German oil company during World War II.

== History ==
Kontinentale Öl was established on 27 March 1941 in Berlin with capital of 80 million Reichsmark (equivalent to 343 million 2021 euros). The company had exclusive rights to trade oil products and to acquire oil assets in German-occupied territories. In addition to the occupied territories, it operated its subsidiaries also in Germany.

In Romania it acquired shares in Concordia and Columbia oil companies which belonged to French and Belgian owners. Later it acquired 50% in the oil company Astra Română.

For the proposed oil production in the Caucasus region, the subsidiary Ost Öl GmbH (Ostöl) was founded in August 1941. The company purchased rigs, vehicles and other production equipment; however, except in Maikop, the oil fields in the Caucasus were never captured by the German Army. Actual oil production in Maikop was minimal, amounting to around 1,000 tons from November 1942 to January 1943, which was used locally for transport purposes. See also Operation Edelweiss.

In July 1941, Baltische Öl GmbH was founded for the oil shale extraction in Estonia. All of the existing oil shale industry was merged into that subsidiary. The company operated in Estonia until September 1944, when Soviet troops were advancing into Estonia. About 200 oil shale specialists employed by Baltische Öl were evacuated to Schömberg, Germany to work the Operation Desert (Unternehmen Wüste).

In August 1942, Karpathen Öl was established which took over oil assets in Galicia.

In 1944, Kontinentale Öl bore huge losses due to the German retreat and the associated loss of assets. After the war the company was placed in trusteeship. In 1949, it was decided to dissolve the company as of 31 October 1950. However, the liquidation was not completed until 1966.

== Shareholders ==
The company had a number of private shareholders, but the sole voting right in the company belonged to Borussia GmbH, a state holding company. However, the leading role in the consortium was held by Deutsche Bank and IG Farben. Other shareholders were energy companies Deutsche Erdöl, Gewerkschaft Elwerath, Wintershall, Preußische Bergwerks- und Hütten and Braunkohle-Benzin, and financial institutions Dresdner Bank, Reichs-Kredit-Gesellschaft and Berliner Handels-Gesellschaft.

== Subsidiaries ==
Kontinentale Öl was a holding company which operated through its subsidiaries. Its subsidiaries were:

- Karpathen Öl AG (founded on 28 August 1942)
- Erdölraffinerei Trzebinia GmbH (founded on 13 March 1942, dissolved in October 1955)
- Baltische Öl GmbH (founded on 25 July 1941, dissolved in November 1955)
- Kontinentale Öl GmbH (founded on 1 July 1943, dissolved in February 1952)
- Ostland-Öl Vertriebs GmbH (founded on 2 October 1941, dissolved together with Kontinentale Öl AG)
- Ostöl GmbH (founded on 28 July 1941, dissolved together with Kontinentale Öl AG)
- Ukraine Öl Vertriebs GmbH (founded on 2 October 1941, dissolved together with Kontinentale Öl AG)
- Albanien Öl GmbH (founded on 17 May 1944, dissolved in 1955)
- Kontinentale Betonschiffbau GmbH (founded on 20 April 1942, dissolved on 31 March 1950)
- Kontinentale Öl Transport AG (founded on 1 September 1941, dissolved in 1997)
- Mineralöl GmbH Südost (founded on 1 July 1943, dissolved in November 1950)
- Sapropel GmbH (founded on 10 August 1944, dissolved in August 1951)
- Süddeutsche Bau GmbH (founded on 18 October 1944, dissolved in October 1953)
- Südostchemie Handels-GmbH (founded on 8 July 1939, dissolved in April 1951)

== Bibliography ==
- Buzatu, Gh. (2004). A History of Romanian Oil Vol II. Editura Mica Valahie. ISBN 9789737858689.
- Eichholtz, Dietrich (2006). Krieg um Öl: ein Erdölimperium als deutsches Kriegsziel (1938-1943) [War for oil: an oil empire as a German war aim (1938-1943)] (in German). Leipziger Universitätsverlag. ISBN 9783865831194.
- Forczyk, Robert (2015). The Caucasus 1942–43: Kleist's race for oil. Campaign 281. Oxford: Osprey. ISBN 978-1472805836.
- Holmberg, Rurik (2008). Survival of the Unfit. Path Dependence and the Estonian Oil Shale Industry (PDF). Linköping Studies in Arts and Science. Vol. 427. Linköping University.
- Karlsch, Rainer; Stokes, Raymond G. (2003). Faktor Öl: die Mineralölwirtschaft in Deutschland 1859-1974 [Oil factor: the oil industry in Germany 1859-1974] (in German). C.H. Beck. ISBN 9783406502767.
- Overy, R. J. (1994). War and Economy in the Third Reich. Oxford University Press. ISBN 9780191647376.
