= Olgina, Narva-Jõesuu =

Village in Estonia

Olgina
- Location within Estonia
- Coordinates: 59°23′43″N 28°7′31″E
- Country: Estonia
- County: Ida-Viru County
- Municipality: Narva-Jõesuu

Population (2011 Census)
  - Total: 459
- Time zone: UTC+2 (EET)

Olgina is a small borough (alevik) in Narva-Jõesuu municipality, Ida-Viru County in northeastern Estonia. At the 2011 Census, the settlement's population was 459, of which ethnic Estonians were 37 (8.1%). Prior to the 2017 administrative reform of local governments, it was located in Vaivara Parish.

year	population
2000	522
2006	552
2010	531
2011	459 (Census)
