= Vaivara, Estonia =

Village in Estonia

Coordinates: 59°22′N 27°46′E

Vaivara
- Village
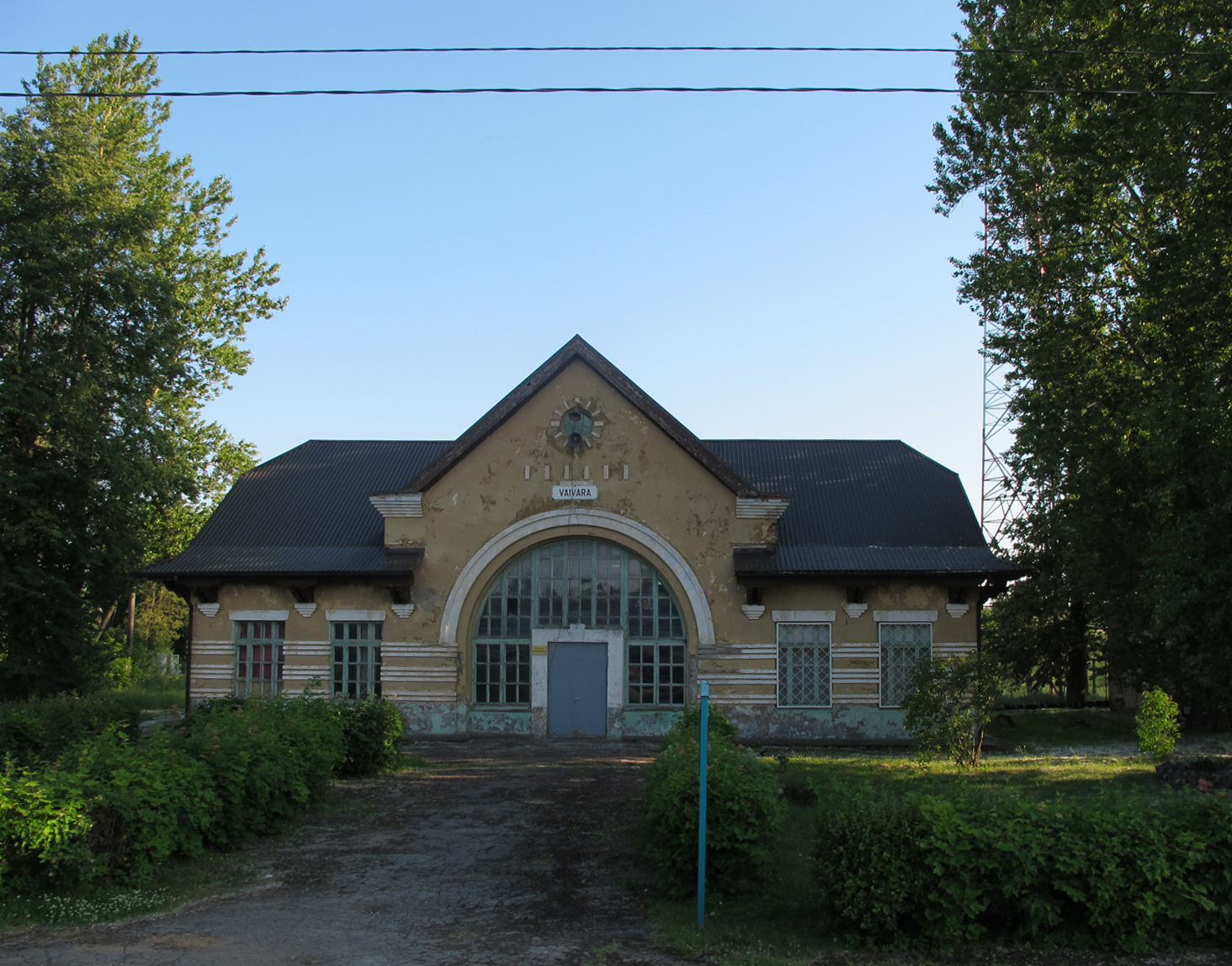
- Vaivara railway station
- Interactive map of Vaivara
- Country: Estonia
- County: Ida-Viru County
- Municipality: Narva-Jõesuu
- Time zone: UTC+2 (EET)
  - Summer (DST): UTC+3 (EEST)

Vaivara (German: Waiwara) is a village in Narva-Jõesuu municipality, Ida-Viru County in northeastern Estonia. Prior to the 2017 administrative reform of local governments, it was located in Vaivara Parish.

During World War II, Vaivara concentration camp, the primary Nazi concentration camp in Estonia, was located near Vaivara train station.

Preceding station	Elron	Following station
Oru towards Tallinn	Tallinn–Narva	Auvere towards Narva
