= Mustanina =

Village in Estonia

Coordinates: 59°21′N 27°43′E

- Village
- Interactive map of Mustanina
- Country: Estonia
- County: Ida-Viru County
- Municipality: Narva-Jõesuu
- Time zone: UTC+2 (EET)
  - Summer (DST): UTC+3 (EEST)

Mustanina is a village in Narva-Jõesuu municipality, Ida-Viru County in northeastern Estonia. Prior to the 2017 administrative reform of local governments, it was located in Vaivara Parish.

Sirgala training area of the Estonian Defence Forces, is located in Mustanina village on a reforested oil-shale mining area.
