= Martin Ekström =

Swedish military personnel and politician

Martin Eugen Ekström
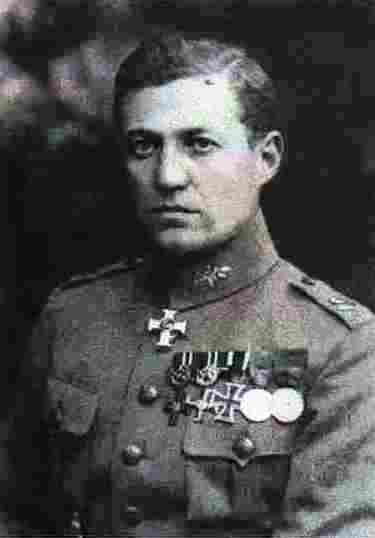
- Martin Ekström
- Born: 6 December 1887; By, Sweden
- Died: 28 December 1954 (aged 67); Helsinki, Finland
- Military career
- Allegiance: Sweden; German Empire; Finland; Estonia; Qajar Iran
- Service years: (1905–1941)
- Rank: Sergeant (Swedish Army); Captain (Iranian Gendarmerie); Oberleutnant (Imperial German Army); Colonel (Estonian Army); Lieutenant colonel (Finnish Army)
- Units: Swedish Army (1905–1911); Swedish Gendarmerie (1911–1915); Imperial German Army (1915–1916); Finnish White Army (1918); Estonian Army (1919); White Guard (1918–1934); Finnish Army (1940–1941)
- Commands: 1918 - Mortar Battery (Finnish White Army); 1918 - Vasa Battalion (Finnish White Army); 1918 - Vasa Regiment (Finnish White Army); 1919 - Finnish Volunteer Battalion (Estonian Army); 1923-1934 Vasa Defence Corps (White Guard); 1940 - 3rd Combat Group (Swedish Volunteer Corps); 1941 - Commander of a Finnish Battalion during the Battle of Hangö
- Conflicts: World War I; Estonian War of Independence; Latvian War of Independence; World War II; Winter War; Continuation War
- Awards: Gold and Silver Bravery Medals of the Order of the Lion and the Sun; 1914 Iron Cross 2nd Class; Ottoman War Medal; Cross of Liberty 3rd and 4th Class with Swords (1918); Medal of the Finnish Civil War; Medal for the Liberation of Tampere; Cross of Liberty I/1 and II/3 (1920); Commemorative Medal for the Estonian War of Independence; The Honour Cross of the World War 1914/1918

Martin Eugen Ekström (6 December 1887 – 28 December 1954) was a Swedish military adventurer who became the leader of the National Socialist Bloc, an umbrella organization for various fascist and National Socialist groups. Ekström was born in By, Avesta Municipality. During the Finnish Civil War, he led the Vasa Regiment which was responsible for the Viipuri massacre. Lieutenant colonel Ekström led the 3rd Battlegroup of the Swedish Volunteer Corps in the Finnish Winter War. He died in Helsinki, aged 67.

== Early life ==
Ekström was born on 6 December 1887 in By, Kopparberg County, the son of Anders Gustav Ekström and his wife Johanna Mathilda (née Eriksson).

== Career ==
Ekström graduated from the Artillery School in 1916 and completed the German officers examination in Turkey in 1916. Ekström was military instructor of the Persian Gendarmerie from 1911 to 1915 and was chief of staff of Vaasa White Guard District. He participated in the Finnish Civil War, the Estonian War of Independence, and the Lithuanian Wars of Independence.

Ekström was the leader of the National Socialist Bloc from 1934 and editor of Riksposten from 1934. He was known for the Viipuri massacre.

== Personal life ==
In 1920, Ekström married Gladys Kurtén (born 1896), the daughter of Karl Henrik Kurtén and Florence Emma Elliott.

== Awards and decorations ==
=== Finnish awards and decorations ===
- Order of the Cross of Liberty 2nd Class with swords and oak leaves
- Order of the Cross of Liberty 2nd Class without swords
- Order of the Cross of Liberty 3rd Class 1918 with swords
- Order of the Cross of Liberty 4th Class 1918 with swords
- Commander of the Order of the White Rose of Finland
- Medal of Liberty 1st Class 1918
- Medal of Liberty 2nd Class 1918
- War of Liberation Commemorative Medal with two clasps
- Commemorative Medal for the Battle of Tampere 1918
- Heimosodat Cross
- Winter War Commemorative Medal with clasp
- Commemorative Cross of the 17th Division
- Commemorative Cross for the Coastal Artillery
- Continuation War Commemorative Medal (posthumous)
- Blue Cross

=== Foreign awards and decorations ===
- Gold Medal for Military Valour (Persia)
- Silver Medal for Military Valour (Persia)
- Iron Cross 2nd Class 1914 (Prussia)
- Gallipoli Star (Ottoman Empire)
- Cross of Liberty I Grade, 1st Class (Estonia)
- Cross of Liberty II Grade, 3rd Class (Estonia)
- Order of the Cross of the Eagle 2nd Class with swords (Estonia)
- Commemorative Medal of the Estonian War of Independence (Estonia)

== Sources ==
- Rees, Philip, ed. (1991). Biographical Dictionary of the Extreme Right Since 1890. Simon & Schuster. ISBN 0-13-089301-3.
