= Viivikonna =

Village in Estonia

- Village
- Location within Estonia
- Coordinates: 59.3381°N 27.6747°E
- Country: Estonia
- County: Ida-Viru County
- Municipality: Narva-Jõesuu

Population (2020)
  - Total: 50
- Time zone: UTC+2 (EET)
  - Summer (DST): UTC+3 (EEST)

Viivikonna is a village in Narva-Jõesuu municipality, Ida-Viru County in northeastern Estonia. Once, it was known as a "central mining town" in Estonia, but today, it is a remote and near-abandoned village. Prior to the 2017 administrative reform of local governments, Viivikonna was a neighbourhood and a distant exclave of the city of Kohtla-Järve.
