= Political history of Estonia =

The political history of Estonia covers the political events and trends in the country throughout its historical period.

== Pre-independence Estonia, before 1918 ==
Before becoming a modern nation state, Estonia was part of the Danish, Swedish, and Russian Empires. The Duchy of Estonia was a direct dominion of the King of Denmark from 1219 until 1346. After the Saint George's Night Uprising, the Danes sold the territory to the Teutonic Order and it became part of the Ordensstaat. A second Duchy of Estonia was a dominion of the Swedish Empire from 1561 until 1721 during the time that most or all of Estonia was under Swedish rule. The land was eventually ceded to Russia in the Treaty of Nystad, following its capitulation, during the plague, in the Great Northern War.

During the Russian rule, the Mahtra War was a peasant uprising against the authorities in 1858. The Russification policies intensified under the governorship of Sergei Shakhovsky from 1885 onwards. At the same time, Estonian nationalism began to be formed in student associations. Part of this was the Young Estonia movement, established in 1905. Following the February Revolution of the Russian Revolution, the Russian Provisional Government incorporated the Governorate of Livonia into Estonia, and also formed the Estonian Provincial Assembly, which organised elections in 1917. On 28 November, the Assembly decided to break from Russia following the October Revolution.

== First era of independence, 1918–1940 ==
=== Conflicts ===
Between retreating Russian and advancing German troops, and the nearing occupation by the German Empire, the Salvation Committee of the Estonian Provincial Assembly declared on 24 February 1918 the independence of Estonia. The German Empire did not recognise the newly-declared Republic of Estonia. However, after the defeat of the Central Powers in World War I in November 1918, Germany withdrew its troops from Estonia, and formally handed power in Estonia over to the Estonian Provisional Government on 19 November. The Estonian War of Independence followed against the Bolshevik westward offensive of 1918–1919 and the 1919 aggression of the Baltische Landeswehr. On 2 February 1920, the Peace Treaty of Tartu was signed by the Republic of Estonia and RSFSR. The terms of the treaty stated that Russia renounced in perpetuity all rights to the territory of Estonia. Meanwhile, Viktor Kingissepp had led a communist uprising at Saaremaa in February 1919, which had been suppressed with 81 rebels killed in battle and 82 executed. Another conflict arose with the Walk crisis with Latvia over a border town, though this was peacefully resolved.

=== Constitutional democracy and its challenges ===
The Constitution of Estonia adopted on 21 December 1920 gave universal suffrage with proportional representation. The Head of State of Estonia combined some of the functions held by a president and prime minister in most other democracies. Fourteen parties were represented in 1923, causing coalition governments to be the norm. The 1924 Estonian coup d'état attempt conducted by the Comintern, was a failed coup attempt in Estonia staged by Communists (mostly infiltrated from Soviet Union) on 1 December 1924. Of the 279 actively participating communists, 125 were killed in action, later more than 500 people were arrested. The government forces lost 26 men.

Between 1924 and 1934, there were 16 different coalition governments formed. The Vaps Movement emerged in reaction with a demand for a smaller parliament and a directly elected president. The Movement was a paramilitary anti-socialist organisation led by former officers of the Russian Tsar's Army, with most of its base being veterans of the Estonian War of Independence. The organisation also advocated a more authoritarian and nationalist government in Estonia. In 1933, a referendum approved a new constitution passing the Movement's demands on the parliament and presidency. Ahead of the following year's elections for both, a state of emergency was declared on 12 March 1934 to prevent the Vaps candidate from winning, with the vote postponed and political gatherings banned.

=== Authoritarian rule ===
During the authoritarian rule following 1934, decision-making was made by Konstantin Päts and his close circle, chosen in large part from his family. Opposition parties were banned. So too were trade unions, while the press was censored and legislation passed by presidential decree rather through the parliament.

== War and occupation, 1940–1991 ==
=== Soviet takeover ===
The Molotov–Ribbentrop Pact gave the Soviet Union free rein to act in Estonia as it wished. Following the Orzeł incident, the Soviets demanded military bases in the country, to which the Estonia acquiesced. This did not initially affect life in the country. On 17 June 1940, the Red Army emerged from its military bases in Estonia and, aided by an additional 90,000 Soviet troops, took over the country, occupying the entire territory of the Republic of Estonia,. Most of the Estonian Defence Forces and the Estonian Defence League surrendered according to the orders and were disarmed by the Red Army. The Estonian Soviet Socialist Republic was soon established and joined the Soviet Union.

=== Nazi occupation and defeat ===
In the course of Operation Barbarossa, Nazi Germany occupied Estonia in July 1941. The Estonian Self-Administration was the puppet government set up in Estonia during the occupation of Estonia by Nazi Germany. It was headed by Hjalmar Mäe. The Estonian Self-Administration was subordinated to the administration of Generalbezirk Estland and its directors were appointed by the chief of the Generalbezirk, Commissioner-General Karl-Siegmund Litzmann. After the German departure, Tallinn was held for four days by a native Estonian government led by Otto Tief. The Estonian government-in-exile was formally declared as the governmental authority of the Republic of Estonia in exile from 1944. Around 10,000 fighters opposed the Soviets with guerrilla warfare.

=== Soviet rule ===
In 1950, the Communist Party of Estonia was taken over by Johannes Käbin in a coup. After 103 senior officials had been purged from leadership positions, he would stay in power until 1978. He was replaced by Karl Vaino, who pursued a Russification policy. The Letter of 40 intellectuals in 1980 was a sign of dissent against the Soviet authorities. In 1987, protests began against proposed phosphate mining. Vaino was replaced by Vaino Väljas, a native Estonian. The Intermovement organisation was established to support the preservation of the Soviet Union in 1988. In November of the same year, the Supreme Soviet of the Estonian Soviet Socialist Republic gave the Estonian Sovereignty Declaration. The declaration asserted Estonia's sovereignty and the supremacy of the Estonian laws over the laws of the Soviet Union.

In 1989, independence activists formed a mass movement called the Estonian Citizens' Committees and started registering persons who were Estonian citizens by birth according to the jus sanguinis principle. In February 1990, the election of a body of representatives of these citizens – the Congress of Estonia – was conducted by those who had been registered. The Estonian National Independence Party won the most seats. Other parties represented included the Popular Front of Estonia. An independence referendum was held on 3 March 1991, which approved it by 78.4% of voters with an 82.9% turnout. Independence was restored by the Estonian Supreme Council on the night of 20 August.

== Second era of independence, 1991–present ==
In September 1991, a Constituent Assembly was formed of equal numbers of members of the Supreme Council of the Republic of Estonia and the Congress of Estonia to work out a new Constitution for the Republic. The new constitution was approved by referendum in June 1992, using the constitution replacement process specified in the 1938 constitution as a matter of legal continuity of the Republic of Estonia. Both the Congress of Estonia and the Supreme Council dissolved themselves in October 1992, with the swearing-in of the first parliament (Riigikogu) elected under the new constitution in September 1992. Many Russians in Estonia were disenfranchised from the election, with the question of their citizenship caused ongoing political tensions. Territorial issues with Russia caused another source of potential conflict. Nevertheless, Russian troops finally left the country in 1994.

Estonia joined NATO on 29 March 2004 and EU on 1 May 2004. Amid political controversy, in April 2007 the Government of Estonia started final preparations for the relocation of the Bronze Soldier of Tallinn stature and reburial of the associated remains, according to the political mandate received from the previous elections (held in March 2007). Disagreement over the appropriateness of the action led to mass protests and riots (accompanied by looting), lasting for two nights, the worst in Estonia since 1944. A series of cyberattacks which began on 27 April 2007 and targeted websites of Estonian organizations, including Estonian parliament, banks, ministries, newspapers and broadcasters, amid the country's disagreement with Russia.

In August 2011, President Toomas Hendrik Ilves was re-elected in a vote in parliament for the second five-year term. Center-right Reform Party was the biggest party in 2011 and 2015 parliamentary elections. Estonian prime minister Andrus Ansip resigned in March 2014, after nine years in office since 2005. He wanted his successor to lead the Reform Party into 2015 elections. In April 2014, Taavi Rõivas of the Reform party became new prime minister.

In October 2016, Estonian parliament elected Kersti Kaljulaid as the new President of Estonia. She was the first female president of Estonia. In the parliamentary elections of 2019, five parties gained seats at Riigikogu. The head of the Centre Party, Jüri Ratas, formed the government together with Conservative People's Party and Isamaa, while Reform Party and Social Democratic Party became the opposition. On 26 January 2021, Reform Party leader Kaja Kallas became Estonia's first female prime minister, making Estonia the only country in the world to currently be led by both a female President and Prime Minister. The new government was a two-party coalition between country's two biggest political parties Reform Party and Centre Party. However, Mr. Alar Karis was sworn in as Estonia's sixth President on 11 October 2021.

In July 2022, Prime Minister Kaja Kallas formed a new three-party coalition by her liberal Reform Party, the Social Democrats and the conservative Isamaa party. Her previous government had lost its parliamentary majority after the center-left Center Party left the coalition.

In March 2023, the Reform party, led by Prime Minister Kaja Kallas, won the parliamentary election, taking 31,4% of the vote. Far-right Conservative People's Party came second with 16,1 % and the third was the Centre Party with 15% of the vote. In April 2023, Kallas formed her third government, which included, in addition to Reform Party, also the liberal Estonia 200 and the Social Democratic (SDE) parties.

In July 2024, Kristen Michal became Estonia’s new prime minister to succeed Kaja Kallas, who resigned as prime minister on 15 July to become the European Union’s new High Representative of the Union for Foreign Affairs and Security Policy.

== See also ==
- Politics of Estonia

== Sources ==
- Taylor, Neil (2020). Estonia: A Modern History. Oxford University Press. ISBN 978-1-78738-337-1.
- Payne, Stanley G. (1995). A History of Fascism, 1914-1945. UCL Press. ISBN 978-1-85728-595-6.
