= Litzmann =

Litzmann is a surname. Notable people with this surname include:

- Berthold Litzmann (1857-1926), German professor of German studies and a literature historian
- Carl Conrad Theodor Litzmann (1815-1890), German obstetrician and gynecologist
- Karl Litzmann (1850-1936), German World War I general and politician
- Karl-Siegmund Litzmann (1893-1945), German politician
- Walter Lehweß-Litzmann (1907-1986), German Major in the Luftwaffe during World War II
