= Reichskommissariat Ostland =

Territory of Nazi Germany from 1941 to 1945

Coordinates: 56°N 26°E

- 1941–1945
- Flag Emblem
- Anthem: Horst-Wessel-Lied ("The Horst Wessel Song")
- Reichskommissariat Ostland in 1942
- Status: Reichskommissariat of Germany
- Capital: Riga
- Common languages: German (official)
- Government: Civil administration
- Reichskommissar
  - 1941–1944: Hinrich Lohse
  - 1944–1945: Erich Koch
- Historical era: World War II
  - Baltic operation: 22 June 1941
  - Established: 17 July 1941
  - Implement civil administration: 25 July 1941 at 12:00
  - Estonia added: 5 December 1941
  - Belarus separated: 1 April 1944
  - Soviets reoccupied Riga: 13 October 1944
  - Formally dissolved: 21 January 1945
  - Surrender of Courland Pocket: 10 May 1945
- Currency: Reichskreditkassenscheine (de facto)
Preceded by
Army Group Centre Rear Area; Army Group North Rear Area
- Today part of: Belarus; Estonia; Latvia; Lithuania; Russia

The Reichskommissariat Ostland (RKO; lit. 'Reich Commissariat of Eastland') (Note: "Ostland" may be translated less literally as Eastern Country or Eastern Territory, though Ostland has no real equivalence in the English language.) was an administrative entity of the Reich Ministry for the Occupied Eastern Territories of Nazi Germany from 1941 to 1945. It served as the German civilian occupation regime in Lithuania, Latvia, Estonia, and the western part of the Byelorussian SSR, during the Eastern Front of World War II.

Ostland was established after the success of the Wehrmacht's Baltic operation and an initial period of military administration by Army Group North Rear Area based on the equivalent Reichskommissariat Baltenland in German planning documents. It was divided into Generalbezirk Estland (Estonia), Generalbezirk Lettland (Latvia), Generalbezirk Litauen (Lithuania), and Generalbezirk Weißruthenien (Belarus) each with its own Nazi collaborationist government and Auxiliary Police under the control of a German Generalkommissar. Hinrich Lohse served as the Reichskommissar from 1941 to 1944 and Erich Koch from 1944 to 1945.

Ostland was part of the Generalplan Ost which included the genocide of the Jewish population, the deportation and murder of Jews from Central Europe, the expulsion and murder of some of the native non-Jewish population, the settlement of Germanic peoples, and the Germanization of the rest. The SS and their Einsatzgruppen A and B, with active participation of the Order Police battalions and local Auxiliary Police forces, killed over a million Jews and others in the territory.

In the course of 1943 and 1944, the Red Army recaptured most of Ostland in their advance westwards, and many of its institutions were dissolved in late 1944 and early 1945. German forces including the rump administration of Ostland held out in the Courland Pocket until 10 May 1945, two days after the German surrender.

== History ==
=== Planning before the attack on the Soviet Union ===
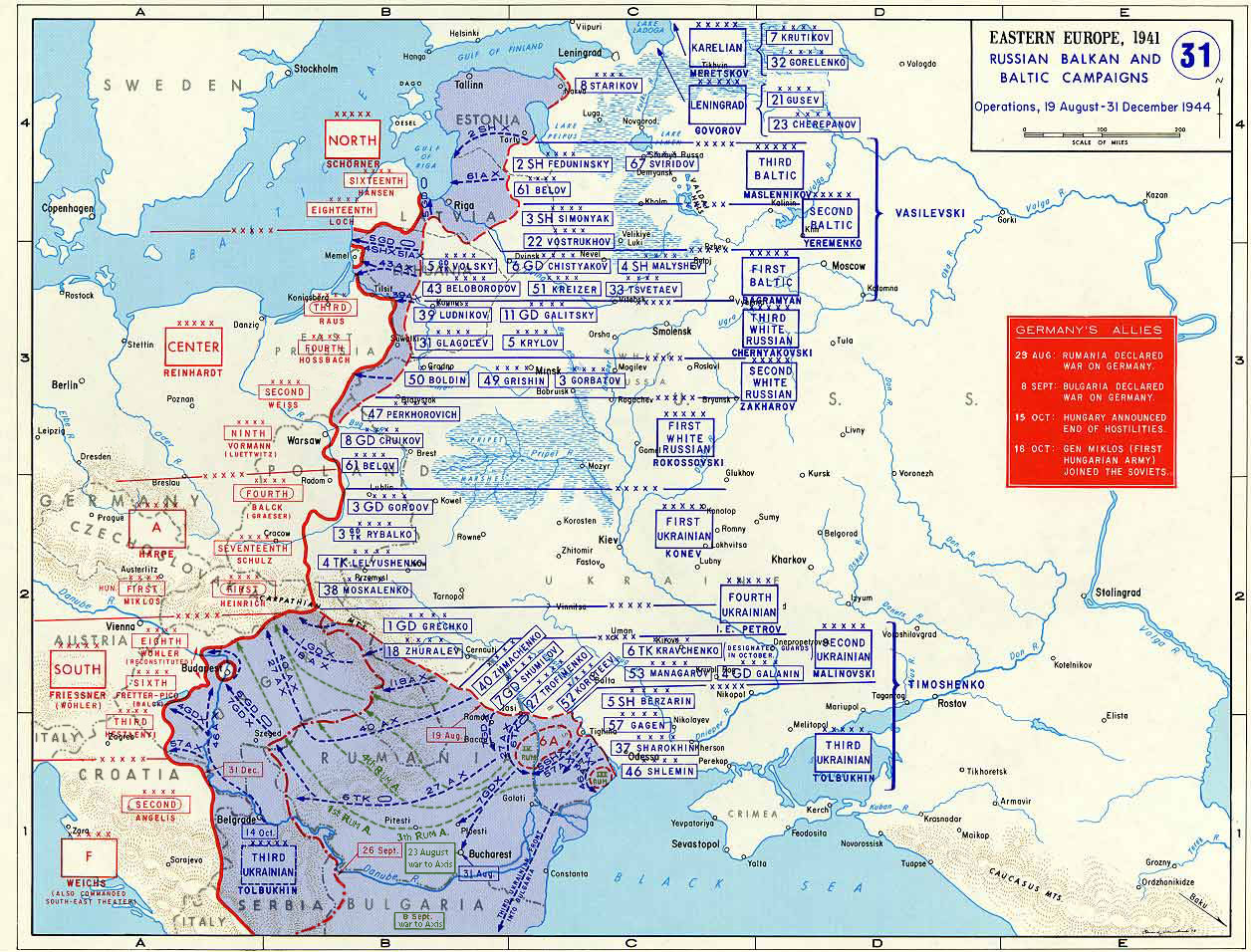
Soviet operations, 19 August to 31 December 1944

Originally the Reichsminister for the Occupied Eastern Territories (German: Reichsminister fur die besetzten Ostgebiete), Alfred Rosenberg envisioned usage of the term Baltenland ("Baltic Land") before the summer of 1941 for the area that would eventually be known as Ostland. Otto Bräutigam, a major colleague of Rosenberg at the time, opposed this idea. In a later declaration he alleged that Rosenberg (himself a Baltic German), was influenced by his "Baltic friends" in forwarding this initiative, in which a "Baltic Reichskommissariat" with the addition of Belarus would be formed, "and with this the White Ruthenians would also be regarded as Balts". A more important additional colleague of Rosenberg, Georg Leibbrandt, spoke out against this. He argued that the sympathy of the Baltic peoples, who would naturally want the use of their own terminology, could be lost entirely. They would therefore not be won over either as supporters of the German war effort, nor as racially valuable settlers for the region.

=== After Operation Barbarossa ===
After the German invasion of the Soviet Union, vast areas were conquered to Germany's east. At first these areas would remain under military occupation by Wehrmacht authorities (Army Group Rear Areas), but as soon as the military situation allowed it, a more permanent form of administration under German rule for these territories would be instituted.

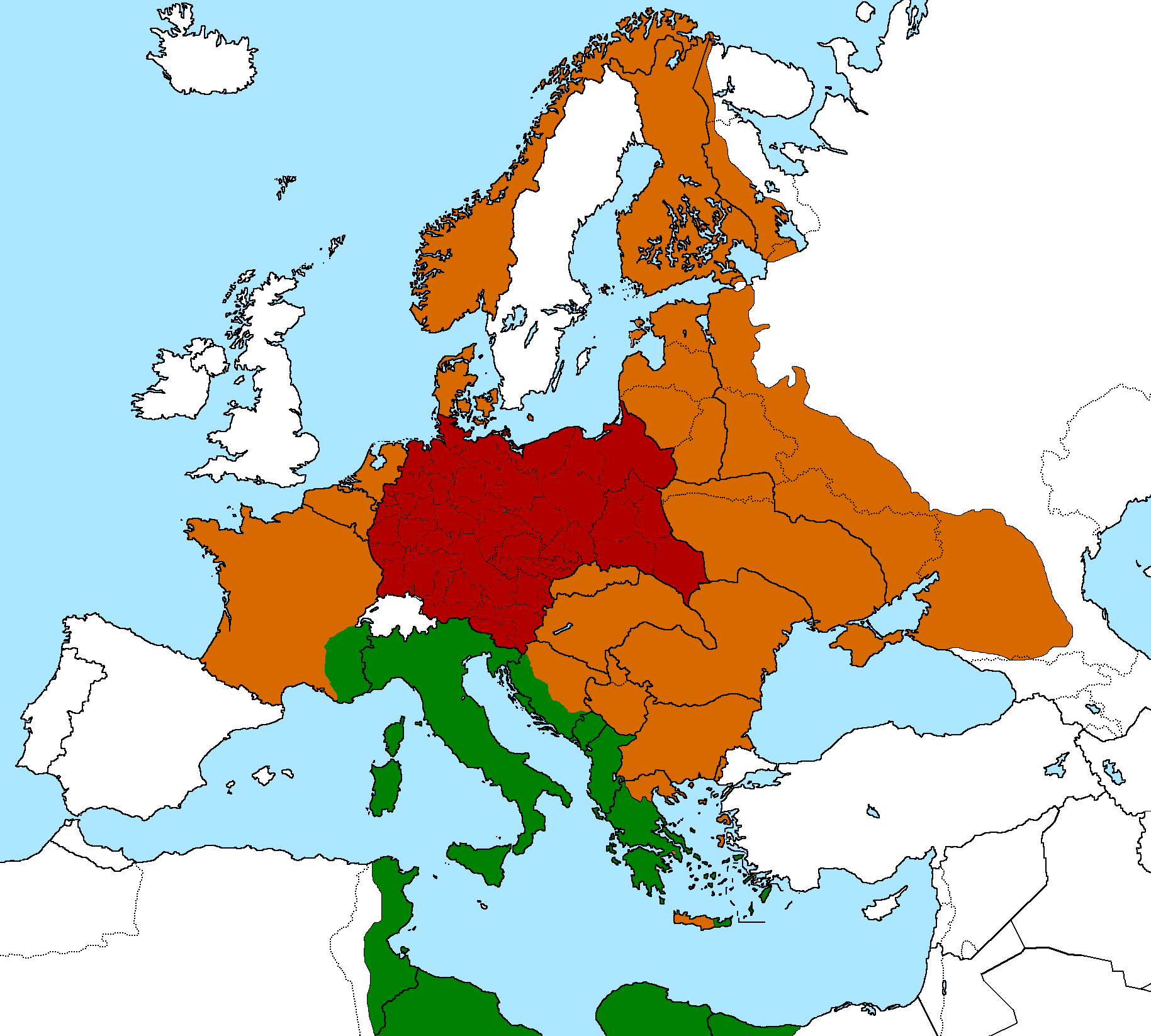
The German Reich and its protectorates (red), its allies and its occupied territories (brown) and Italy (green) in 1942, with Reichskommissariats (some brown)

Führer Decree of 17 July 1941 provided for this move. It established "Reichskommissariats" in the east, as administrative units of the Greater German Reich. The structure of each Reichskommissariat was defined by the same decree. Each of these territories would be led by a German civil governor known as a Reichskommissar appointed by Hitler and answerable only to him. The official appointed for Ostland was Hinrich Lohse, the Oberpräsident and Gauleiter of Schleswig-Holstein. Local government in the Reichskommissariat was to be organized under a "National Director" (Reichskomissar) in Estonia, a "General Director" in Latvia, and a "General Adviser" in Lithuania.

Rosenberg's ministerial authority was, in practice, severely limited. The first reason was that many of the practicalities were determined elsewhere: the Wehrmacht and the Schutzstaffel managed the military and security aspects, Fritz Sauckel as Reich Director of Labour had control over manpower and working areas, Hermann Göring and Albert Speer had total management of economic aspects in the territories and the Reich Postal Service administered the Eastern territories' postal services. These German central government interventions in the affairs of Ostland overriding the appropriate ministries were known as "special administrations" (Sonderverwaltungen). Later, from September 1941, the civil administration that had been decreed in the previous July was actually set up. Lohse and Erich Koch objected to these breaches of their supposed responsibilities, seeking to administer their territories with the independence and authority of Gauleiters. On 1 April 1942, an arbeitsbereich (lit. 'working sphere', a name for the party cadre organization outside the Reich proper) was established in the civilian-administered parts of the occupied Soviet territories, whereupon Koch and Lohse gradually ceased communication with Rosenberg, preferring to deal directly with Adolf Hitler through Martin Bormann and the Party Chancellery. In the process they also displaced all other actors including notably the SS, except in Central Belarus where HSSPF Erich von dem Bach-Zelewski had a special command encompassing both military and civil administration territories and engaged in Nazi security warfare.

In July 1941, the civil administration was declared in much of the occupied Soviet territories before one had materialized in the field. A power vacuum emerged which the SS filled with its SS and Police Leadership Structure, exercising unlimited power over security and policing which it gave up only grudgingly in the autumn when civil administration came into being; indeed Heinrich Himmler would use various tactics until as late as 1943 in unsuccessful efforts to regain this power. This partly explains the strained relations between the SS and the civil administration. In Ostland, matters were further complicated by the personality of the local superior SS officer Friedrich Jeckeln, attacked by the SS's opponents for his alleged corruption, brutality and mindless foolhardiness.

== German plans ==
The short-term political objectives for Ostland differed from those for the Ukraine, the Caucasus or the Moscow regions. The Baltic lands, which were to be joined together with Belarus (to serve as a spacious hinterland of the coastal areas), would be organized as one Germanized protectorate prior to union with Germany itself in the near future. Rosenberg said that these lands had a fundamentally "European" character, resulting from 700 years of history under Swedish, Danish, and German rule, and should therefore provide Germany with "Lebensraum", an opinion shared by Hitler and other leading Nazis. The Belarusians, however, were considered by the scholars of the Reich Ministry for the Occupied Eastern Territories as "little and weak peasant people" dwelling in "folkish indifference", but also "the most harmless and because of this the least dangerous for us of all the peoples in the Eastern Space" and an ideal object of exploitation. Rosenberg suggested that Belarus would be in the future an appropriate reception area of various undesirable population elements from the Baltic part of Ostland and German-occupied Poland. He also toyed with the idea of turning the country into a huge nature reserve.

The regime planned to encourage the post-war settlement of Germans to the region, seeing it as a region traditionally inhabited by Germans (see the Teutonic Order and the Northern Crusades) that had been overrun by Slavs. This was tried in practice in the province of Pskov during World War II, when ethnically German and Dutch people were resettled from Romania. This settlement of Dutch settlers was encouraged by the Dutch East Company (Nederlandsche Oost-Compagnie), a Dutch-German organization.

Historical German and Germanic-sounding placenames were also retained (or introduced) for many Baltic cities, such as Reval (Tallinn), Kauen (Kaunas), and Dünaburg (Daugavpils), among many others. To underscore the region's planned incorporation into Germany some Nazi ideologists further suggested the future use of the names Peipusland for Estonia and Dünaland for Latvia once they had become part of Germany. The ancient Russian city of Novgorod, the easternmost foreign trading post of the Hanseatic League, was to be renamed Holmgard. During the occupation, the Germans also published a "local" German-language newspaper, the Deutsche Zeitung im Ostland.

== Administrative and territorial organization ==
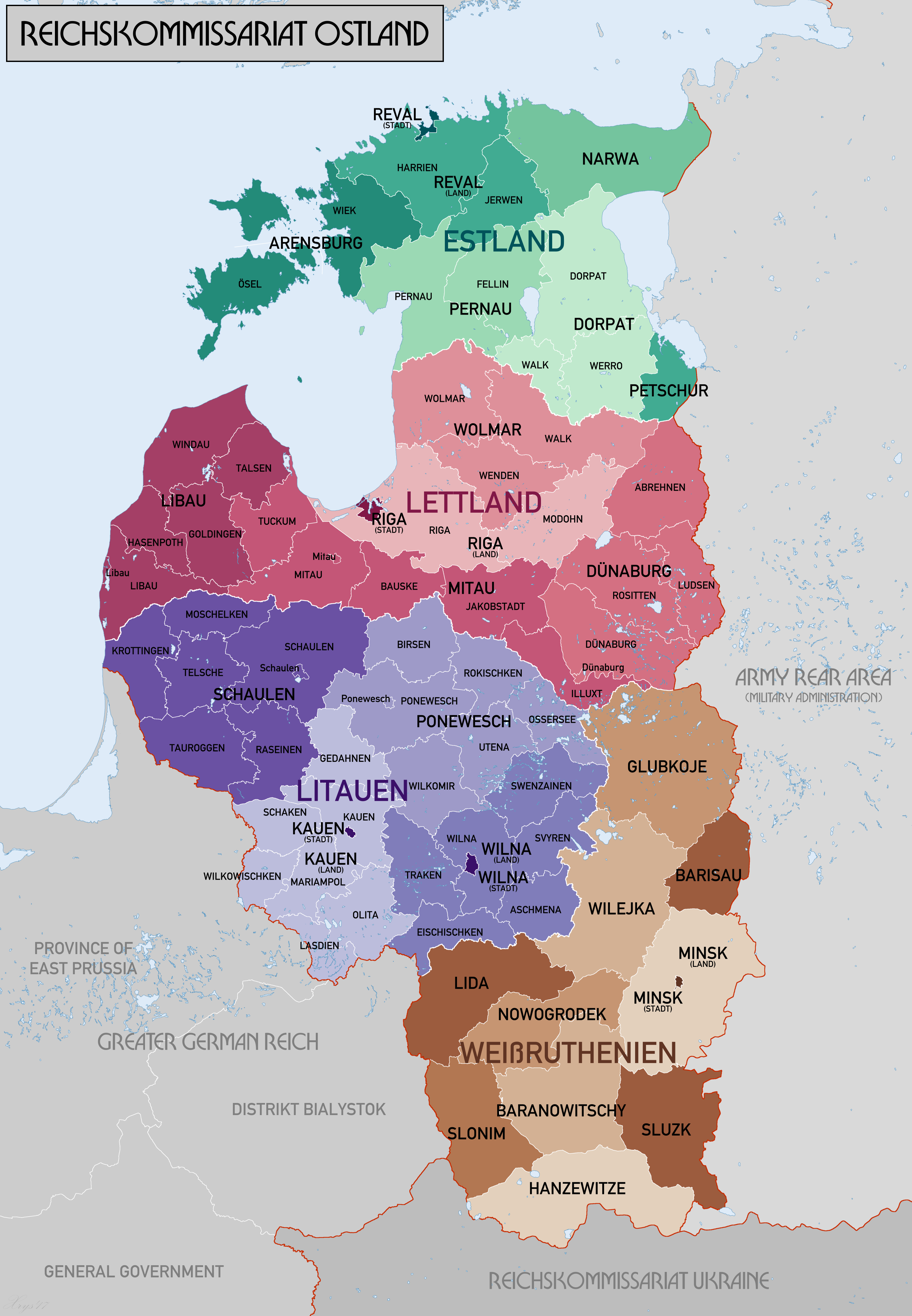
Administrative divisions of Reichskommissariat Ostland

The Reichskommissariat Ostland was sub-divided into four "General Regions" (Generalbezirke), namely Estonia, Latvia, Lithuania, and White Ruthenia (Belarus), headed by a Generalkommissar. The regions were further divided into "Districts" (Kreisgebiete). In the three Baltic states their previous counties (Es:Maakonnad, Lv:Aprinka, Lt:Apskritys) were also retained as a further sub-division (Kreise). The conquered territories further to the east were under military control for the entirety of the war. The intention was to include these territories in the anticipated future extension of Ostland. This would have incorporated Ingria (Ingermannland), as well as the Novgorod, Pskov and Smolensk areas into the Reichskommissariat. Estonia's new eastern border was to reach somewhere beyond the Volkhov River forming the new eastern border of the Baltic country, while Latvia was to reach the Velikiye Luki region. Belarus was to extend east to include the Smolensk region. The local administration of the Reichskommissariat Ostland was headed by Reichskommissar Hinrich Lohse. Below him there was an administrative hierarchy: a Generalkomissar led each Generalbezirk, while Gebietskommissars administered Kreisgebiete, respectively. The German administrative center for the entire region, as well as the seat of the Reichskommissar, was in Riga, Latvia.

=== Generalbezirk Estland (Estonia) ===
District seat: Reval (Tallinn)

Generalkommissar: Karl-Siegmund Litzmann
SS and Police Leader: Hinrich Möller (1941–1944); Walther Schröder (1944)

Subdivided into seven Kreisgebiete:

- Arensburg (Kuressaare)
- Narwa (Narva)
- Dorpat (Tartu)
- Pernau (Pärnu)
- Petschur (Petseri)
- Reval-Land (Tallinn-Rural)
- Reval-Stadt (Tallinn-Urban)

=== Generalbezirk Lettland (Latvia) ===
District seat: Riga

Generalkommissar: Otto-Heinrich Drechsler
SS and Police Leader: Walther Schröder

Subdivided into six Kreisgebiete:

- Dünaburg (Daugavpils)
- Libau (Liepāja)
- Mitau (Jelgava)
- Riga-Land (Riga-Rural)
- Riga-Stadt (Riga-Urban)
- Wolmar (Valmiera)

=== Generalbezirk Litauen (Lithuania) ===
District seat: Kauen (Kaunas).

Generalkommissar: Theodor Adrian von Renteln
SS and Police Leader: Lucian Wysocki (1941–1943); Hermann Harm (1943–1944); Kurt Hintze (1944)

Subdivided into six Kreisgebiete:

- Kauen-Land (Kaunas-Rural).
- Kauen-Stadt (Kaunas-Urban).
- Ponewesch (Panevėžys).
- Schaulen (Šiauliai).
- Wilna-Land (Vilnius-Rural).
- Wilna-Stadt (Vilnius-Urban).

=== Generalbezirk Weißruthenien (White Ruthenia or Belarus) ===
Set up across the territory of the Byelorussian SSR (including West Belarus, previously Wilno and Nowogródek regions of the eastern territories of Poland annexed by the Soviet Union). On 1 April 1944, Generalbezirk Weißruthenien was detached from Reichskommissariat Ostland and was placed directly under the Reich Ministry for the Occupied Eastern Territories.

District seat: Minsk.

Generalkommissar: Wilhelm Kube (1941–1943); Curt von Gottberg (1943–1944)
SS and Police Leader: Jakob Sporrenberg (1941); Carl Zenner (1941–1942); Karl Schäfer (1942); Curt von Gottberg (1942–1943); Erich Ehrlinger (1943–1944)

Subdivided into eleven Kreisgebiete:

- Baranowitsche (Baranovichi)
- Barisau (Barysau)
- Hanzewitschy (Hantsavichy)
- Lida
- Glubokoye (Hlybokaye)
- Minsk-Land (Minsk-Rural)
- Minsk-Stadt (Minsk-Urban)
- Nowogródek (Navahrudak)
- Slonim
- Sluzk (Sluck)
- Wilejka (Vileyka)

=== Other authorities ===
In March 1943, Wilhelm Kube succeeded in installing the Belarusian Central Council (a collaborationist puppet regime), which existed concurrently with the German civil administration.

The military command was controlled by the Wehrmachtbefehlshaber Ostland ("Military Commander Ostland"). He was responsible for security within the occupied territories, to protect traffic connections and to record the harvest. These commanders were:

- Generalleutnant Walter Braemer (24 June 1941 – 18 April 1944)
- General der Panzertruppe Werner Kempf (1 May 1944 – 10 August 1944)

== Policies ==
Upon taking control, Hinrich Lohse proclaimed the official decree ("Verkündungsblatt für das Ostland") on November 15, 1941, whereby all Soviet state and party properties in the Baltic area and Belarus were confiscated and transferred to the German administration.

In Ostland, the administration returned lands nationalized by the Soviets to the former peasant owners. In towns and cities, small workshops, industries and businesses were returned to their former owners, subject to promises to pay taxes and quotas to the authorities. Jewish properties were confiscated. In Belarus, a state enterprise was established to manage all former Soviet government properties. One of the German administrators was General commissar Wilhelm Kube.

Ostgesellschaften (state monopolies) and so-called Patenfirmen, private industrial companies representing the German government, were quickly appointed to manage confiscated enterprises. The Hermann Göring Workshops, Mannesmann, IG Farben and Siemens assumed control of all former Soviet state enterprises in Ostland and Ukraine. An example of this was the takeover, by Daimler-Benz and Vomag, of heavy repair workshops, in Riga and Kiev, for the maintenance of all captured Russian T-34 and KV-1 tanks, linked with their repair workshops in Germany.

In Belarus, the German authorities lamented the "Jewish-Bolshevik" policies that had allegedly denied the people knowledge of the basic concepts of property, ownership, or personal initiative. Unlike the Baltic area, where the authorities saw that "during the war and the occupation's first stages, the population gave examples of sincere collaboration, a way for possibly giving some liberty to autonomous administration".

=== Economic exploitation ===
The Nazis viewed Slavs as a pool of slave labor for use by the German Reich; if necessary they could be worked to death.

=== Extermination of the Jews in Ostland ===
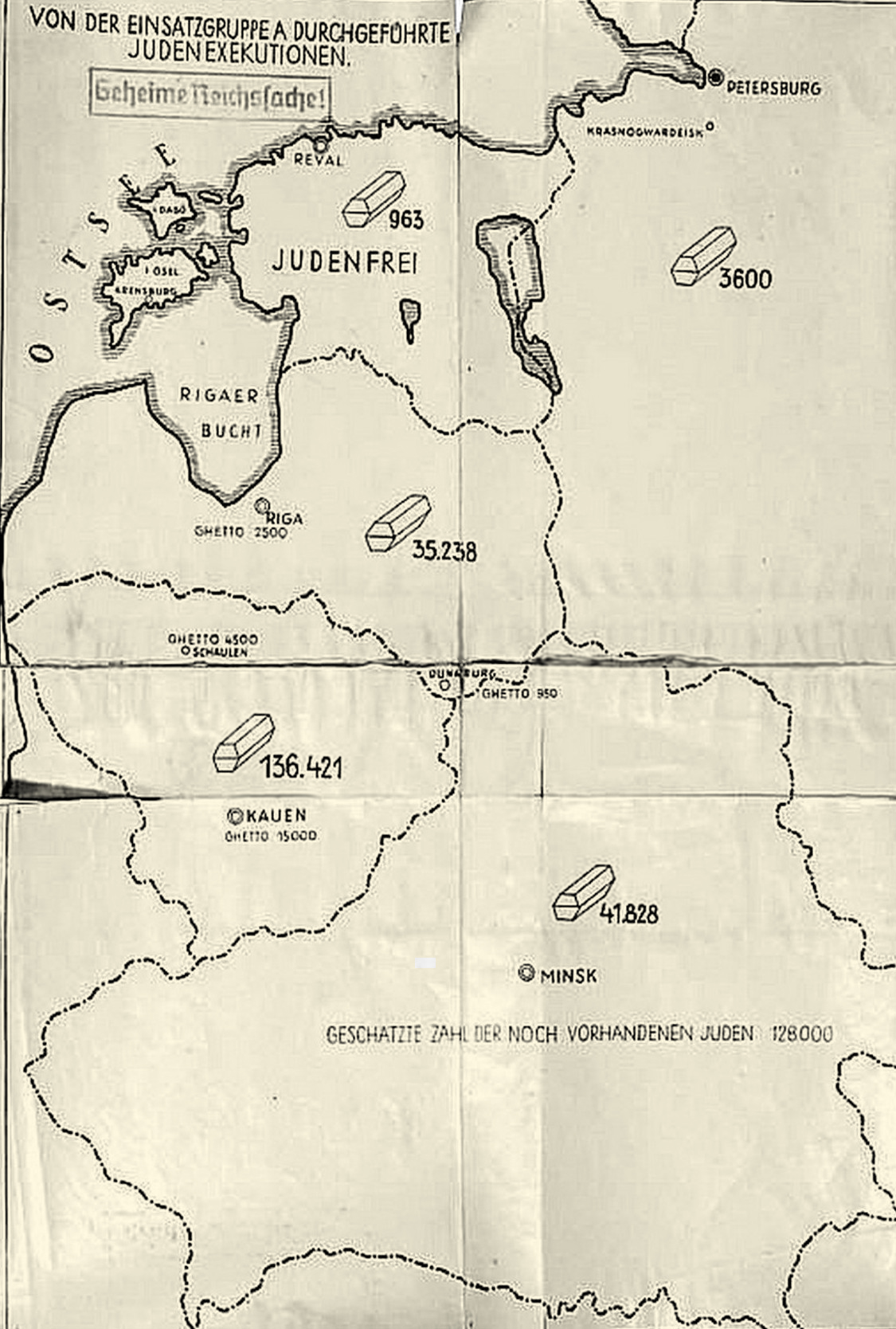
Original map from Franz Walter Stahlecker's Report, summarizing murders committed by Einsatzgruppen in Reichskommissariat Ostland until January 1942. The line of text reads: "Estimated number of Jews still on hand is 128,000". Estonia is marked Judenfrei.

At the time of the German invasion in June 1941 there were significant Jewish minorities in Ostland – nearly 480,000 people. To these were added deportees from Austria, Germany, and elsewhere.

Jews were confined to Nazi ghettos in the Riga Ghetto and Kaunas Ghetto, which rapidly became overcrowded and squalid. From these they were taken to execution sites.

The Soviet Red Army reported the discovery of Vilna and Kauen extermination centres as apparently part of the Nazi "Final Solution". The extermination of the resident Jews began almost immediately after the invasion and was later extended to the deportees.

In autumn 1943, the ghettos were "liquidated", and the remaining occupants were moved to camps at Kaiserwald and Stutthof near Danzig or, if not capable of work, killed.

== Government figures ==
Aside from the German political leaders mentioned above, including Reich Minister Alfred Rosenberg, General Commissar Karl-Siegmund Litzmann and General Commissar Wilhelm Kube, the regional collaborationist structures across Reichskommissariat Ostland included Estonian political leaders such as Hjalmar Mäe, Oskar Angelus, Alfred Wendt (or Vendt), Otto Leesment, Hans Saar, Oskar Öpik, Arnold Radik, Johannes Soodla; Latvian political leaders with Oskars Dankers, and Rūdolfs Bangerskis; Lithuanian political leaders: Juozas Ambrazevičius, and Petras Kubiliūnas; as well as the Belarusian nationalist leaders from the Belarusian Central Council.

== Partisan movement ==
German and local security authorities were kept busy by Soviet partisan activities in Belarus. They noted that "infected zones" of partisan action included an area of 500 or 600 km^{2}, around Minsk, Pinsk, Gomel, Bryansk, Smolensk and Vitebsk, including the principal roads and railways in these areas.

== See also ==
- Occupations of Estonia, Latvia, Lithuania and Belarus by Nazi Germany
- Wartime collaboration in the Baltic states
