= Lucian Wysocki =

SS and Police Leader and SS-Brigadeführer

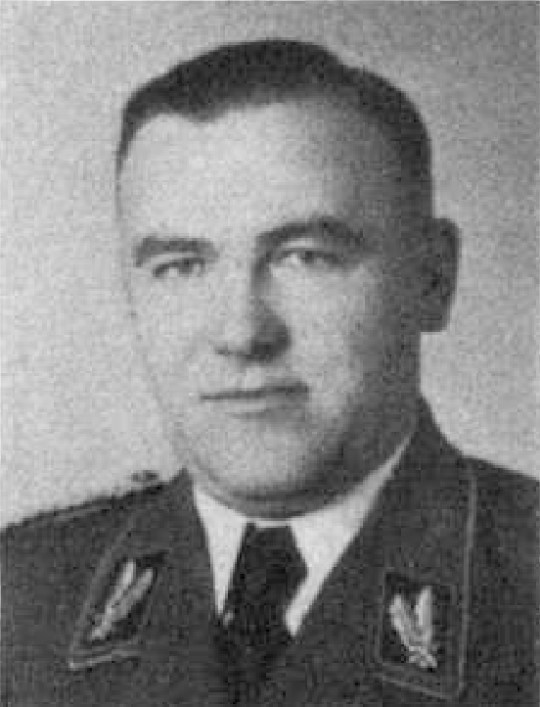
- Wysocki, c. 1937-1938
- Born: 18 January 1899; Gentomie (today, Gętomie), Province of West Prussia, Kingdom of Prussia, German Empire
- Died: 13 December 1964 (aged 65); Rheinhausen, North Rhine-Westphalia, West Germany
- Military career
- Allegiance: German Empire; Weimar Republic, Nazi Germany
- Branch: Imperial German Army; Reichswehr; Schutzstaffel
- Service years: 1917–1920; 1940–1945
- Rank: SS-Brigadeführer and Generalmajor of the Police
- Commands: Police President of Oberhausen; Mülheim an der Ruhr; Duisburg; Kassel; SS and Police Leader, "Litauen"
- Conflicts: World War I; World War II
- Awards: Iron Cross, 2nd class

Lucian Wysocki (18 January 1899 – 13 December 1964) was a German Nazi Party politician, Police President and member of both the SA and the SS. As an SS-Brigadefuhrer and Generalmajor of police, he served as the SS and Police Leader of Generalbezirk Litauen (today, Lithuania) during the Second World War.

== Early life ==
Wysocki was born in West Prussia the son of a teacher. From 1905 to 1917 he attended volksschule in Gentomie (today, Gętomie) and a preparatory school in Marienwerder (today, Kwidzyn). Upon completing his education in April 1917, he volunteered for military service in the First World War. He saw action on both the eastern front and, from March 1918, the western front. He attained the rank of Unteroffizier (corporal) in the 257th Reserve Infantry Regiment and earned the Iron Cross 2nd class. On 19 September 1918, he was taken prisoner by American forces, and was released from captivity in August 1919. He then served from October through December 1919 in the 3rd Infantry Regiment of the Reichswehr, the armed forces of the Weimar Republic. Returning to civilian life, he worked as a miner and a stonecutter in a quarry at Baesweiler.

== Peacetime SA and police career ==
Wysocki became a member of the Nazi Party on 1 May 1929 (membership number 132,988). As an early member of the Party, he would later be awarded the Golden Party Badge. He had already joined the SA, the Party's paramilitary force, on 1 February of the same year. From 1930 to 1931 he served in the Party's local political organization in Essen. In October 1931 he was commissioned an SA-Sturmführer, and was promoted to SA-Sturmbannführer in January 1932. In July 1932 he was elected as a Nazi deputy to the Reichstag for electoral constituency 20, Cologne–Aachen, but lost his seat in the November 1932 election. After the Nazi seizure of power, he was returned to the Reichstag in March 1933 and would serve there until the end of the Nazi regime, switching to constituency 22, Düsseldorf East, at the March 1936 election and constituency 23, Düsseldorf West, at the April 1938 election.

In August 1933, Wysocki advanced to SA-Obersturmbannführer and, in November, to SA-Standartenführer. He commanded SA-Standarte 138, based in Duisburg, from August 1933 to August 1934 and also served as a City Councillor during that time. He then commanded SA-Standarte 171, headquartered in Wuppertal, until January 1937. At that time, he was placed in command of SA-Brigade 73 in Essen, remaining there through May 1940. In May 1937 he was promoted to SA-Oberführer, and in September 1937 he was named Police President of both Oberhausen and Mülheim an der Ruhr. He achieved his final SA rank of SA-Brigadeführer in January 1939, followed by his appointment as Police President of Duisburg the following November, a post he would retain until August 1941.

== Second World War ==
On 21 June 1940, Wysocki left the SA and transferred to the SS (membership number 365,199) with the rank of SS-Brigadeführer. He was assigned to SS-Oberabschnitt (Main District) "West," based in Düsseldorf. Following the German invasion of the Soviet Union, Wysocki in July 1941 was made SS garrison commander of Wilno (today, Vilnius) in German-occupied Lithuania. Effective 11 August 1941, he was appointed the first SS and Police Leader (SSPF) in the recently established Generalbezirk Litauen in the Reichskommissariat Ostland, with his headquarters in Kaunas. In this post, he commanded all SS personnel and police in his jurisdiction, including the Ordnungspolizei (Orpo; regular uniformed police), the SD (intelligence service) and the SiPo (security police), which included the Gestapo (secret police). On 27 September 1941, he was granted the rank of Generalmajor of Police.

Wysocki's tenure as SSPF coincided with the height of the Holocaust in Lithuania, including mass executions such as the Kaunas massacre of October 29, 1941. Following the German invasion, the death squads of Einsatzgruppe A and their Lithuanian collaborators, including the Lithuanian Security Police, immediately began the systematic murder of Lithuanian Jews. Out of approximately 208,000 – 210,000 Jews, an estimated 190,000 – 195,000 were murdered, most between June and December 1941.

On 2 July 1943, Wysocki left his SSPF post in Kaunas and was transferred to Minsk to serve as a Special Duty SSPF for anti-partisan operations on the staff of Acting Higher SS and Police Leader (HSSPF) "Russland Mitte" (Central Russia), SS-Gruppenführer Curt von Gottberg. Following a period of illness and hospitalization, Wysocki left his post in Minsk and returned to police duties in Germany as Police President of Kassel, from 19 March 1944 until the end of the war in Europe on 8 May 1945. Following the war, Wysocki worked as a clerk at the Horten department store in Duisburg and died in 1964. He was never prosecuted for Holocaust-related activities in Lithuania.

== Literature ==
- Klee, Ernst (2007). Das Personenlexikon zum Dritten Reich. Wer war was vor und nach 1945. Frankfurt-am-Main: Fischer-Taschenbuch-Verlag. ISBN 978-3-596-16048-8.
- Schiffer Publishing Ltd., ed. (2000). SS Officers List: SS-Standartenführer to SS-Oberstgruppenführer (As of 30 January 1942). Schiffer Military History Publishing. ISBN 0-7643-1061-5.
- Yerger, Mark C. (1997). Allgemeine-SS: The Commands, Units and Leaders of the General SS. Schiffer Publishing Ltd. ISBN 0-7643-0145-4.
