= Hinrich Möller =

SS and Police Leader and SS-Brigadeführer

- Möller (left) greeting Estonian volunteers in Tartu
- Born: 20 April 1906; Grevenkop, Province of Schleswig-Holstein, Kingdom of Prussia, German Empire
- Died: 13 October 1974 (aged 68); Preetz, Schleswig-Holstein, West Germany
- Military career
- Allegiance: Weimar Republic; Nazi Germany
- Branch: Reichswehr; Waffen-SS
- Service years: 1924; 1930–1945
- Rank: SS-Brigadeführer and Generalmajor of Police
- Commands: Police Chief of Neumünster; Police Director of Flensburg; SS and Police Leader, "Estland"
- Conflicts: World War II
- Awards: Iron Cross, 2nd class War Merit Cross, 1st and 2nd class with Swords

Hinrich Möller (20 April 1906 – 13 October 1974) was a German SS-Brigadeführer and Generalmajor of Police. He served as police chief in Neumünster and Flensburg in the 1930s. During the Second World War, he was the SS and Police Leader (SSPF) "Estland" (today, Estonia). In this position, he played a significant role in the Holocaust in Estonia. Möller was never tried for his involvement after the war. He was, however, convicted of the 1934 murders of two Communist Party leaders.

== Early life ==
Möller was born in Grevenkop in the Province of Schleswig-Holstein. After completing his secondary education in 1924, he served very briefly with Pioneer Battalion 6 in the Reichswehr. He was an early member of the Nazi Party (membership number 113,298) joining it and its paramilitary branch, the SA, on 1 February 1929. In April 1930, he joined the Schutzpolizei, a branch of the uniformed police under the Weimar Republic and would remain with them after the Nazi seizure of power until July 1934.

== Peacetime SS and police career ==
On 15 October 1930, Möller left the SA and joined the SS (SS number 5,741). He was commissioned an SS-Sturmführer on 21 November 1931. After the Nazis came to power in January 1933, he was appointed Chief of Police in Neumünster. It was in this position that he orchestrated the murders by his SS staff of two prominent German Communist Party functionaries, Rudolf Timm on the night of 23–24 January 1934 and Christian Heuck on 23 February. In both instances, the murdered men were strangled in their cells and the murders were covered-up as alleged suicides by hanging, attested to by the prison doctor.

Shortly after these episodes, Möller on 7 July 1934 became the commander of the 50th SS-Standarte, based in Flensburg, and would hold this command until 1 September 1942. In September 1937, Möller was named acting Police Director in Flensburg and, in May 1938, this appointment was made permanent. While head of the police in Flensburg, Möller participated in the events of Kristallnacht, the 9–10 November 1938 pogrom against the Jews. He led an attack on the Jägerslust estate near Flensburg, a Hakhshara agricultural center that prepared Jews for emigration to Palestine. The residents were mistreated, arrested and deported to the Sachsenhausen concentration camp; only a few were able to save themselves by fleeing across the nearby border with Denmark. In nearby Friedrichstadt, an SA mob destroyed the synagogue, and the shops and homes of Jewish citizens. Möller had all the Jewish men arrested and transported several of them to Sachsenhausen.

== Second World War ==
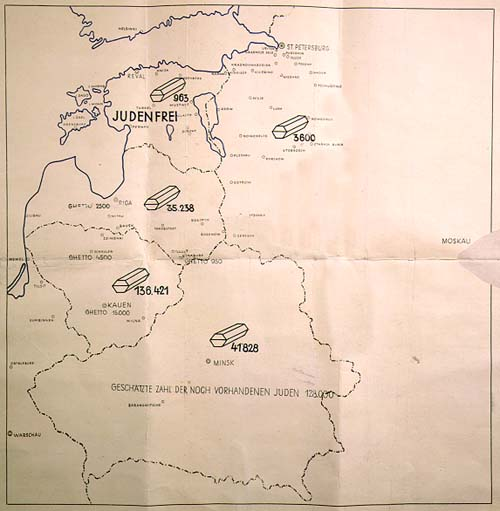
A map from January 1942 shows the number of Jews murdered in the Reichskommissariat Ostland. Note that "Estland" is annotated "judenfrei."

From September 1940 to August 1941, Möller performed military service in the Waffen-SS as an SS-Hauptsturmführer of reserves. After the invasion of the Soviet Union, Möller left his Flensburg police post and was assigned to the Reichskommissariat Ostland which was administered by Reichskommissar Hinrich Lohse who was also the Gauleiter of Schleswig-Holstein. On 4 August 1941, Möller was appointed the first SS and Police Leader in the Generalbezirk Estland, which comprised the former Estonian SSR with its capital in Tallinn, now renamed Reval. His time there coincided with the height of the Holocaust in Estonia and he played a leading role in the destruction of the Estonian Jews. It has been estimated that approximately 75% of Estonian Jews had fled eastward into the Soviet Union ahead of the Nazi occupation. Virtually all of those who remained (between 950 and 1,000 people) were murdered. The Estonian International Commission for Investigation of Crimes Against Humanity estimated the total number of victims killed in Estonia to be roughly 35,000, including approximately 1,000 Estonian Jews, 10,000 foreign Jews, 1000 Estonian Romani, 7000 ethnic Estonians and 15,000 Soviet prisoners of war.

On 30 January 1944, Möller was promoted to SS-Brigadeführer and Generalmajor of Police. He left his SSPF position on 1 April 1944 and was transferred to the staff of SS-Oberabschnitt (Main District) Ostland, under the command of Obergruppenführer Friedrich Jeckeln, the Higher SS and Police Leader for the Baltic States and northern Russia, headquartered in Riga. While there, he was involved in setting up the Latvian Provisional Administration in the Courland pocket. In mid-February 1945 Möller was detailed to Army Group Vistula, and served there until the end of the war in Europe on 8 May 1945. During the war, he was awarded the Iron Cross, 2nd class and the War Merit Cross, 1st and 2nd class with Swords.

SS and Police Ranks
| Date | Rank |
|---|---|
| 21 November 1931 | SS-Sturmführer |
| 20 April 1933 | SS-Sturmhauptführer |
| 1 March 1934 | SS-Sturmbannführer |
| 30 January 1935 | SS-Obersturmbannführer |
| 1 January 1936 | SS-Standartenführer |
| 1 August 1941 | SS-Oberführer |
| 11 June 1943 | Oberst der Polizei |
| 30 January 1944 | SS-Brigadeführer and Generalmajor der Polizei |

== Postwar prosecutions ==
Möller stood trial for his acts of terror against Jewish citizens in Schleswig-Holstein during the Kristallnacht and was sentenced to three years in prison. He was also tried and, on 4 December 1947, found guilty of the extrajudicial killing of the two Communist prisoners in Neumünster, and was sentenced to death by the Regional Court of Kiel. The sentence was commuted to life imprisonment in 1948 and reduced to 15 years in 1954. Möller was released from custody in 1958. He was never prosecuted for his involvement in the murders in Estonia.

== Sources ==
- Gerhard, Paul; Gillis-Carlebach, Miriam (1998). Menora und Hakenkreuz: Zur Geschichte der Juden in und aus Schleswig-Holstein, Lübeck und Altona (1918-1998). Neumünster: Wachholtz Verlag. ISBN 978-3-529-06149-3.
- Klee, Ernst (2007). Das Personenlexikon zum Dritten Reich. Wer war was vor und nach 1945. Frankfurt-am-Main: Fischer-Taschenbuch-Verlag. ISBN 978-3-596-16048-8.
- Miller, Michael D.; Schulz, Andreas (2017). Gauleiter: The Regional Leaders of the Nazi Party and Their Deputies, 1925–1945. Vol. 2 (Georg Joel - Dr. Bernhard Rust). R. James Bender Publishing. ISBN 978-1-932-97032-6.
- Schiffer Publishing Ltd., ed. (2000). SS Officers List: SS-Standartenführer to SS-Oberstgruppenführer (As of 30 January 1942). Schiffer Military History Publishing. ISBN 0-7643-1061-5.
- Yerger, Mark C. (1997). Allgemeine-SS: The Commands, Units and Leaders of the General SS. Schiffer Publishing Ltd. ISBN 0-7643-0145-4.
