= Karl Litzmann =

German general (1850–1936)

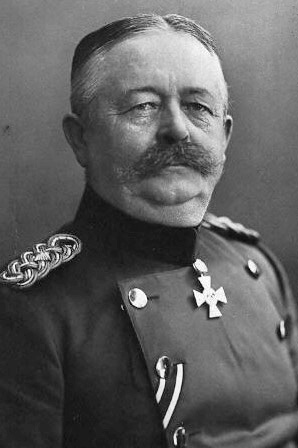
- Litzmann in 1916
- Born: 22 January 1850; Neuglobsow, Province of Brandenburg, Kingdom of Prussia
- Died: 28 May 1936 (aged 86); Neuglobsow, Germany
- Relatives: Karl-Siegmund Litzmann (son); Walter Lehweß-Litzmann (grandson)
- Military career
- Allegiance: North German Confederation; German Empire
- Branch: Prussian Army
- Service years: 1867–1905; 1914–1918
- Rank: General der Infanterie
- Nickname: Lion of Brzeziny
- Commands: 49th Infantry Regiment; 74th Infantry Brigade; 39th Division; 3rd Guards Infantry Division; XXXX Reserve Corps
- Conflicts: Franco-Prussian War; World War I; Battle of Łódź; Second Battle of the Masurian Lakes; Siege of Kaunas
- Awards: Pour le Mérite with Oakleaves; Iron Cross, 2nd class

Karl Litzmann (22 January 1850 – 28 May 1936) was a German military officer who fought in the Franco-Prussian War, led division and corps commands in World War I and rose to the rank of General der Infanterie. After his retirement from military service, he became a Nazi Party politician, serving in the Landtag of Prussia and the Reichstag.

== Early life and career ==
Litzmann was born in 1850 at Neuglobsow (today, part of Stechlin) in the Kingdom of Prussia. He entered the Prussian Army in April 1867 and attended the United Artillery and Engineering School from 1868 to 1870. He then fought in the Franco-Prussian War of 1870–71 as a Leutnant in a Guards pioneer battalion and was awarded the Iron Cross, 2nd class. He attended the Prussian War Academy in Berlin between 1872 and 1875. Rising through the ranks, he became the director of the war academy in 1902, and retired from the military as a Generalleutnant in 1905.

== World War I ==
On the outbreak of World War I, Litzmann was reactivated for military service. He first was assigned to a staff position on the communications directorate of the 3rd Army headquarters in Dresden. Within months, however, he was transferred to a field command on the eastern front at the head of the 3rd Guards Infantry Division. Fighting during the Battle of Łódź, Litzmann's troops were such a key factor in the German victory, that he was awarded the Pour le Mérite on 29 November 1914 for his actions, and he earned the nickname "the Lion of Brzeziny". In December, Litzmann was promoted to General der Infanterie and was given command of the XXXX Reserve Corps, a position he held until August 1918. He led this formation during the February 1915 Second Battle of the Masurian Lakes and the Siege of Kaunas in August, an event for which he received the Oak Leaves to the Pour le Mérite on 18 August 1915. Following the armistice with Russia, Litzmann's corps was transferred to the western front in January 1918. He served there until 6 August 1918, when his request to retire from active service was granted.

== Interwar years ==
Litzmann became a member of Nazi Party in 1929 having previously become a member of SA. He was elected as a deputy to the Reichstag in November 1932 from electoral constituency 5 (Frankfurt an der Oder) but resigned his mandate on 15 December 1932 on grounds that he had responsibilities to the Landtag of Prussia, where he was its most senior member, also known as Father of the House or Alterspräsident. In the next election of 5 March 1933, he was re-elected to his former seat in the Reichstag, but resigned again on 2 April 1933 due to his seat in the Landtag. At the election of 12 November 1933, he again was elected to the Reichstag, this time from constituency 4 (Potsdam I) and served until his death in 1936. On 26 August 1933, Prussian Minister President Hermann Göring appointed him to the recently reconstituted Prussian State Council where he also served until his death.

The Chief of Staff of the Luftwaffe, Generalleutnant Walther Wever, died in an air accident shortly after taking off from Dresden to attend Litzmann's funeral in Berlin on 3 June 1936.

== Honours ==
After the 1939 invasion of Poland, the towns of Łódź and Brzeziny were renamed in honour of Litzmann. On 11 April 1940, Łódź was officially retitled by the occupying German forces as Litzmannstadt, while Brzeziny later became Löwenstadt (lion city). After World War II, the towns reverted to their original Polish names. Passau named a street after him, and he was named an honorary citizen of Neuruppin, an honour that was withdrawn in 2007.

== Family ==
Litzmann was the father of Karl-Siegmund Litzmann (1893–1945) who was General Commissioner for Estonia in the Reichskommissariat Ostland during the German occupation 1941–1944. He was also grandfather to Walter Lehweß-Litzmann (1907–1986).

Military offices
Preceded by New Formation	Commander, XXXX Reserve Corps; 24 December 1914 – 6 August 1918	Succeeded by Generalleutnant; Paul Grünert
