= Kurt Hintze =

SS and Police Leader and SS-Brigadeführer

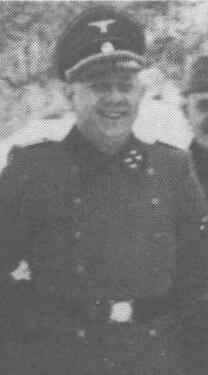
- Hintze in Slovenia in 1941
- Born: 8 October 1901; Fehrbellin, Province of Brandenburg, Kingdom of Prussia, German Empire
- Died: 13 November 1944 (aged 43); Kattowitz, Province of Upper Silesia, Nazi Germany
- Military career
- Allegiance: Nazi Germany
- Branch: Schutzstaffel (SS)
- Service years: 1937–1944
- Rank: SS-Brigadeführer and Generalmajor of Police
- Commands: SS and Police Leader, "Litauen"
- Conflicts: World War II
- Awards: War Merit Cross, 1st and 2nd class, with Swords

Kurt Gustav Ernst Hintze (8 October 1901 – 13 November 1944) was a Nazi Party politician, SS-Brigadeführer and Generalmajor of police, who served as the last SS and Police Leader (SSPF) in the Generalbezirk Litauen (today, Lithuania). He was killed in an air raid six months before the end of the war.

== Early life ==
Born in Fehrbellin, the son of a watchmaker, Hintze attended school in Berlin until 1915, then worked as an unskilled worker in ammunition factories during the First World War. After the end of the war in 1918, he shifted to working in agriculture in Brüsenhagen, a subdivision of the municipality of Gumtow in Brandenburg.

From 1921 to 1922, Hintze was a member of the antisemitic and Völkisch German Social Party. For part of 1923, he belonged to the Black Reichswehr, an extra-legal paramilitary organization. After that he became a member of the Freikorps Roßbach and the Frontbann, the front organization set up when the Nazi Party's paramilitary group, the SA, was outlawed after the failed Beer Hall Putsch. From 1924 into 1925, Hintze worked as a speaker for the National Socialist Freedom Party, the Nazi's political front organization. On 1 September 1928, he formally became a member of both the now reestablished SA and the Nazi Party (membership number 98,200). As an early Party member, he later would be awarded the Golden Party Badge.

== SA and political career ==
From May 1929 to July 1930, Hintze was an Ortsgruppenleiter (Local Group Leader) in Wittstock and later a Bezirksleiter (District Group Leader) in Ostprignitz-Ruppin. On 18 June 1931, he was commissioned an SA-Sturmführer. Advancing to SA-Sturmbannführer in December 1931, he commanded a battalion of the 39th SA-Standarte until December 1933. His next assignment was as a department head at the SA Reichsführerschule (National Leader School) in Munich where he served through September 1934. He then led SA-Brigade 7, based in Neu-Stettin (today, Szczecinek, Poland), in Pomerania from 1 October 1934 to 1 December 1936. During this time, he advanced rapidly through the ranks, being promoted to SA-Obersturmbannführer (9 November 1934), SA-Standartenführer (20 April 1935) and, finally, SA-Oberführer (9 November 1935). He left full-time SA service at the end of 1936, working from January through July 1937 as an administrator at the German Labour Front (DAF). On 1 July 1937 he left the SA entirely, and joined the SS with the rank of SS-Oberführer (membership number 282,066). From 22 September 1937 to 1 February 1940, he was the commander of SS-Abschnitt (District) XI, headquartered in Koblenz.

Hintze was also active in politics, being elected as a Nazi deputy to the Reichstag for electoral constituency 4 (Potsdam I) in July 1932 and serving until the November 1933 election. At the March 1936 election, he was returned to the Reichstag as a deputy from electoral constituency 6 (Pomerania) and would serve until the end of the Nazi regime, switching to constituency 20 (Cologne-Aachen), at the April 1938 election.

== Second World War ==
After the beginning of the Second World War, Hintze was deployed from November 1939 to 1 February 1940 in the General Government, responsible for refugee affairs of ethnic Germans in the area and reporting to the Higher SS and Police Leader (HSSPF) "Ost" in Kraków, SS-Obergruppenführer Friedrich-Wilhelm Krüger. He also served as an SS leader of the Selbstschutz, a paramilitary militia of ethnic Germans. During this time, these units worked together with the Einsatzgruppen death squads to conduct massacres of ethnic Poles. From February 1940 until 13 January 1941, Hintze served as commander of SS-Abschnitt XXXXI in Thorn (today, Toruń, Poland). Also during this time, from 5 September to 1 November 1940, he performed military service with the Waffen-SS as an Untersturmführer, then Obersturmführer, of reserves. He served as leader of a supply column of the 1st SS Panzer Division Leibstandarte SS Adolf Hitler.

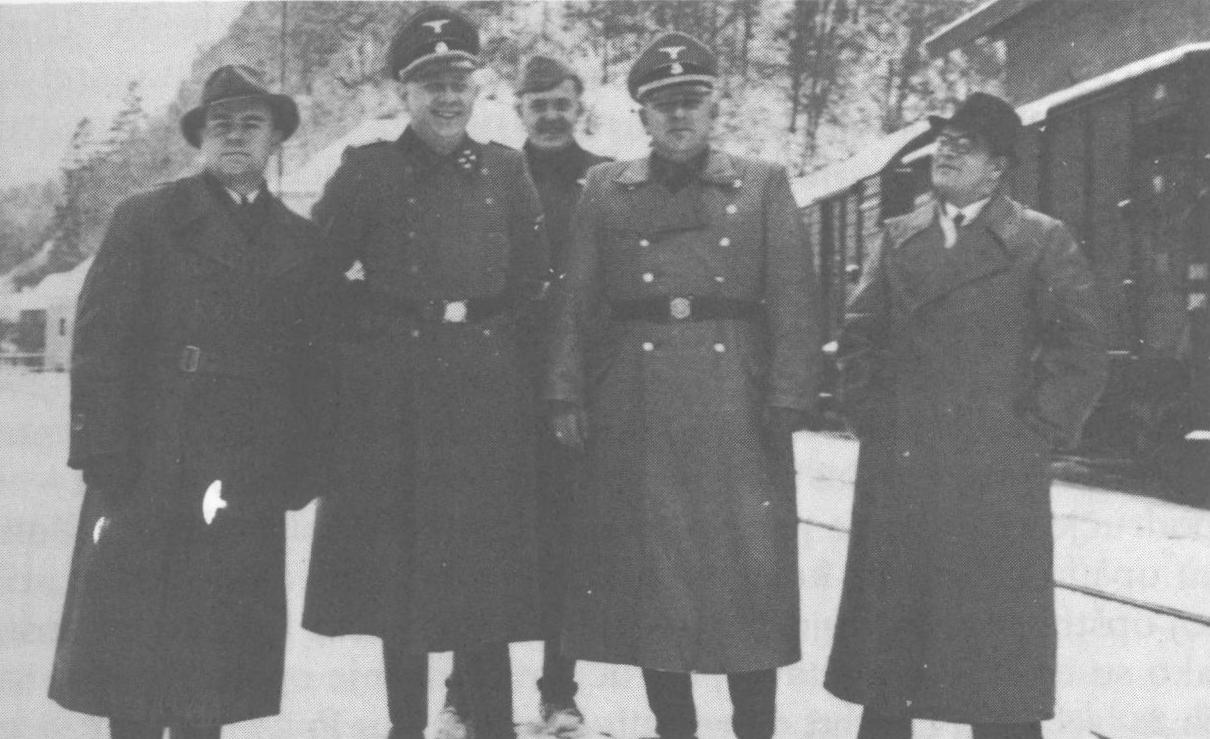
Hintze (2nd from right) in Rajhenburg, 8 November 1941

From 10 January 1941, Hintze worked in the SS headquarters in Berlin for Reichsführer-SS Heinrich Himmler in his capacity as Reich Commissioner for the Consolidation of German Nationhood (RKFDV). Hintze first was employed as head of the Resettlement Office. From October to December 1941, he oversaw the forcible resettlement of approximately 46,000 Slovenes from Lower Styria. They were transported to eastern Germany for potential Germanization and/or forced labor, in order to give their lands to ethnic Germans (Gottscheers). Hintze next headed RKFDV's Office II (Labor Deployment) until April 1944, being promoted to SS-Brigadeführer on 30 January 1942. From 13 November 1943 to 21 February 1944, he also acted as Himmler's Sonderbeauftragter (Special Representative) to the SS troop training area, (SS-Truppenübungsplatz Kurmark) located in Jamlitz, Brandenburg.

On 21 February 1944, Hintze was made a Generalmajor of Police, and was sent to serve in the office of the HSSPF "Ostland und Russland-Nord," SS-Obergruppenführer Friedrich Jeckeln. On 8 April 1944, he succeeded SS-Brigadeführer Hermann Harm as the last SS and Police Leader (SSPF) "Litauen," with his headquarters in Kauen (today, Kaunas). Following the Red Army's Kaunas offensive, the city fell on 1 August 1944 and Hintze's command was soon effectively eliminated. On 15 September 1944, he was transferred to be the representative of the Reich Defense Commissioner of Upper Silesia, Gauleiter Fritz Bracht, to the fortress staff in Kattowitz (today, Katowice, Poland). He also acted as the liaison officer between Bracht and the HSSPF "Südost," SS-Obergruppenführer Ernst-Heinrich Schmauser, who was based in Breslau (today Wrocław, Poland). Hintze died in an air raid on Kattowitz on 13 November 1944.

== Sources ==
- Klee, Ernst (2007). Das Personenlexikon zum Dritten Reich. Wer war was vor und nach 1945. Frankfurt-am-Main: Fischer-Taschenbuch-Verlag. ISBN 978-3-596-16048-8.
- Schiffer Publishing Ltd., ed. (2000). SS Officers List: SS-Standartenführer to SS-Oberstgruppenführer (As of 30 January 1942). Schiffer Military History Publishing. ISBN 0-7643-1061-5.
- Yerger, Mark C. (1997). Allgemeine-SS: The Commands, Units and Leaders of the General SS. Schiffer Publishing Ltd. ISBN 0-7643-0145-4.
