= Oskar Angelus =

Estonian politician, Nazi collaborator

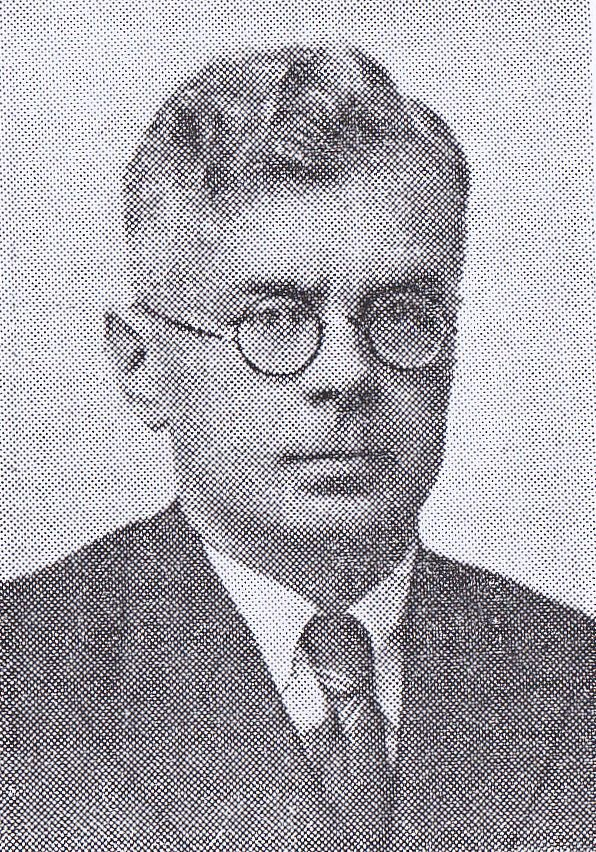
Oskar Angelus

Oskar Angelus (7 May 1892 – 3 November 1979) was an Estonian politician and collaborator with Nazi Germany.

== Biography ==
Angelus was born in Kolga Parish (now Kuusalu Parish), Kreis Harrien in the Governorate of Estonia of the Russian Empire, the son of Karl Angelus and Sophie Auguste Johanna Angelus (née Eichhorn).

In 1911, Angelus graduated from the University of Dorpat. He participated in the Estonian War of Independence and was awarded the Cross of Liberty, 3rd Class. Until 1940, he worked at the Estonian Department of Internal Affairs. In 1941, after the German occupation of Estonia and the establishment of the Estonian Self-Administration (which was subordinated to Reichskomissariat Ostland), Angelus was made Director for Home Affairs. In this position, he established the Estonian Security Police and SD, which arrested, prosecuted, and handed over to the German authorities Soviet collaborators, as well as the remaining Estonian Jews and Roma.

When the German forces retreated from Estonia in 1944, Angelus fled to Germany. He stayed there until 1950, when he relocated to Sweden. Angelus lived in the Scanian city of Lund until his death in 1979, and was never prosecuted for his role in the Holocaust.
