= Karl-Siegmund Litzmann =

German Nazi politician (1893–1945)

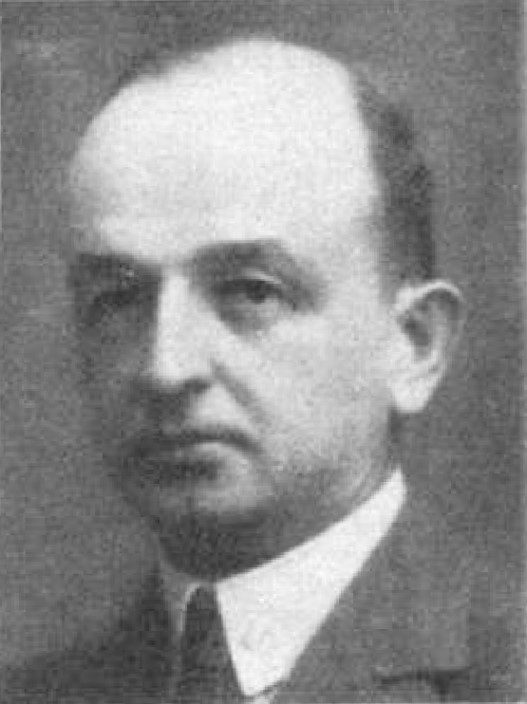

Generalkommissar of Generalbezirk Estland
- In office 5 December 1941 – 17 September 1944
- Preceded by: Position created
- Succeeded by: Position abolished

Personal details
- Born: 1 August 1893 Minden, Kingdom of Prussia, German Empire
- Died: August 1945 (aged 52) Kappeln, Schleswig-Holstein, Allied occupied Germany
- Party: Nazi Party
- Profession: Military officer Estate manager

Military service
- Allegiance: German Empire
- Branch/service: Imperial German Army
- Years of service: 1913–1918
- Rank: Leutnant
- Unit: Reserve Infantry Regiment 261
- Battles/wars: World War I
- Awards: Iron Cross, 1st and 2nd class House Order of Hohenzollern, Knight's Cross with swords

Karl-Siegmund Hermann-Julius Litzmann (1 August 1893 – August 1945) was a German Nazi politician and official who served as the Generalkommissar of Generalbezirk Estland in the Reichskommissariat Ostland from December 1941 to September 1944

Litzmann was a distinguished veteran of World War I and an early member of the Nazi Party and Sturmabteilung (SA), becoming responsible for equestrian training and forming cavalry units for the SA and other Nazi organisations. Litzmann was appointed Nazi governor of German-occupied Estonia in 1941, overseeing the Estonian Self-Administration and mass killings by the SS. Litzmann fled the Red Army advance into Estonia in 1944 and was reassigned to the Waffen-SS in Central Europe where he went missing in action in early 1945. Litzmann was found alive in Allied-occupied Germany shortly after the war but died under unexplained circumstances.

== Early years ==
Karl-Siegmund Hermann-Julius Litzmann was born on 1 August 1893 in Minden, Westphalia, the son of Imperial German Army General Karl Litzmann, and was the uncle of Walter Lehweß-Litzmann. Litzmann enrolled in cadet school of the Imperial German Army in 1905 and was appointed a Fahnenjunker in 1911, receiving his commission as a Leutnant in November 1913 after completing the officer course in Paderborn. He was assigned to Reserve Infantry Regiment 261 and served throughout the First World War, being wounded in action three times. Litzmann was present at the Battle of Łódź in late 1914, where German forces under the command of his father broke out of an encirclement by the Imperial Russian Army. He earned both classes of the Iron Cross as well as the Knight's Cross of the House Order of Hohenzollern with swords. In 1919, Litzmann received training in agricultural management from the large landowner Carl Wentzel in Teutschenthal, and in 1921 he took over the administration of the Wentzel estate near Insterburg in East Prussia (present-day Chernyakhovsk, Kaliningrad Oblast).

== Political career ==
In 1929, Litzmann joined the Nazi Party (membership number 168,167) and the Sturmabteilung (SA), leading the SA's development in East Prussia. As an early Nazi Party member, he would later be awarded the Golden Party Badge. In 1930, as an SA-Standartenführer, he was commissioned with the development of what would become the Reiter-SA (Equestrian SA), essentially the cavalry of the SA. This involved the incorporation of horse breeding and riding clubs into the SA, and their merger with mounted SA units. In 1931, Litzmann was promoted to SA-Gruppenführer and named the commander of SA-Gruppe Ostland.

In July 1932, Litzmann was elected to the Landtag of Prussia as a Nazi deputy, and served until its dissolution in October 1933. On 12 November 1933, he was elected to the Reichstag from electoral constituency 1 (East Prussia). He was reelected in 1936 and 1938, and retained his seat until the fall of the Nazi regime in 1945.

On 27 June 1933, Litzmann was promoted to SA-Obergruppenführer, and in July he took command of the newly formed SA-Obergruppe I comprising East Prussia. On 11 July 1933, he was named to the Prussian State Council by its Minister President Hermann Göring. In the summer of 1934, Litzmann escaped the liquidation of the SA leadership in the Night of the Long Knives, being ordered by Adolf Hitler to stay away from the SA leadership meeting held at Bad Wiessee on 30 June 1934. Hitler probably wanted to spare General Karl Litzmann, whom he greatly admired, from the pain of having his son murdered by the SS.

In 1935, Litzmann was made a member of the People's Court. He also was appointed Reichsreiterführer (Reich Equestrian Leader), the highest authority for horse breeding and racing. He was charged with establishing the Reichsreiterführerschul (Reich Equestrian Leadership School) in Berlin-Zehlendorf which he led as Reich Inspector of SA Equestrian Schools. He also was placed in charge of preparing the German riding team for the 1936 Summer Olympics. The National Socialist Equestrian Corps (Nationalsozialistisches Reiterkorps) was formed in March 1936 in order to ensure a uniform training standard for all mounted units of the SA, SS and the Hitler Youth,. Although this organization was technically separate from the SA, Litzmann who headed it as Reich Inspector for Equestrian and Driving Training, reported directly to SA-Stabschef Viktor Lutze.

== Generalkommissar in Estonia ==
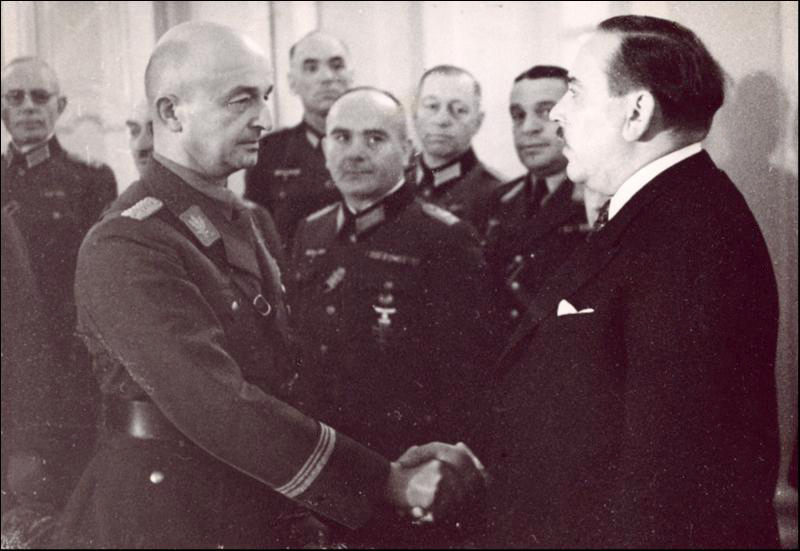
Generalkommissar Karl-Siegmund Litzmann and the head of the Estonian Self-Administration Hjalmar Mäe on 5 December 1941

In 1941, Litzmann was appointed Generalkommissar for the Generalbezirk Estland in the Reichskommissariat Ostland with headquarters in Reval (Tallinn) after equestrian training for the SA and the Wehrmacht was discontinued. The position made Litzmann the highest-ranking Nazi official in German-occupied Estonia, responsible for the civil government of the territory. He oversaw the Estonian Self-Administration of Hjalmar Mäe and the murder of many thousands of Estonians, Jews and Soviet prisoners of war by the SS. In official Estonian language texts, Litzmann's name was spelt Lietzmann out of consideration for his wife, because the Estonian word lits means "slut". However, he continued to spell his own name with the regular spelling.

On 17 September 1944, the Red Army launched the Tallinn offensive and Litzmann left for Hungary, becoming an SS-Sturmbannführer in the Waffen-SS on 30 January 1945. After the fighting in Hungary and Czechoslovakia in the spring of 1945, he was considered missing in action. In May 1945, however, Litzmann turned up under a false name living with his sister in Kappeln in Schleswig-Holstein, and reportedly died under unclear circumstances in August 1945. In the spring of 1946, the family estate in Neuglobsow was expropriated as part of land reform under the Soviet occupation. Litzmann was officially declared dead on 31 July 1949.

== See also ==
- German occupation of Estonia during World War II
- Holocaust in Estonia
- Nationalsozialistisches Reiterkorps

== Sources ==
- Klee, Ernst (2007). Das Personenlexikon zum Dritten Reich. Wer war was vor und nach 1945. Frankfurt-am-Main: Fischer-Taschenbuch-Verlag. ISBN 978-3-596-16048-8.
- Lilla, Joachim (2005). Der Preußische Staatsrat 1921–1933: Ein biographisches Handbuch. Düsseldorf: Droste Verlag. ISBN 978-3-770-05271-4.
- Littlejohn, David (1990). Hitler's Stormtroopers. Düsseldorf: Osprey Publishing. ISBN 978-0-85045-944-9.
- Miller, Michael D.; Schulz, Andreas (2017). Gauleiter: The Regional Leaders of the Nazi Party and Their Deputies, 1925–1945. Vol. 2 (Georg Joel - Dr. Bernhard Rust). R. James Bender Publishing. ISBN 978-1-932-97032-6.
