= Generalbezirk Litauen =

Nazi German occupation regime in Lithuania

Generalbezirk Litauen Lietuvos generalinė sritis (Lithuanian)
- Generalbezirk of the Reichskommissariat Ostland
- 1941–1944
- Flag Emblem

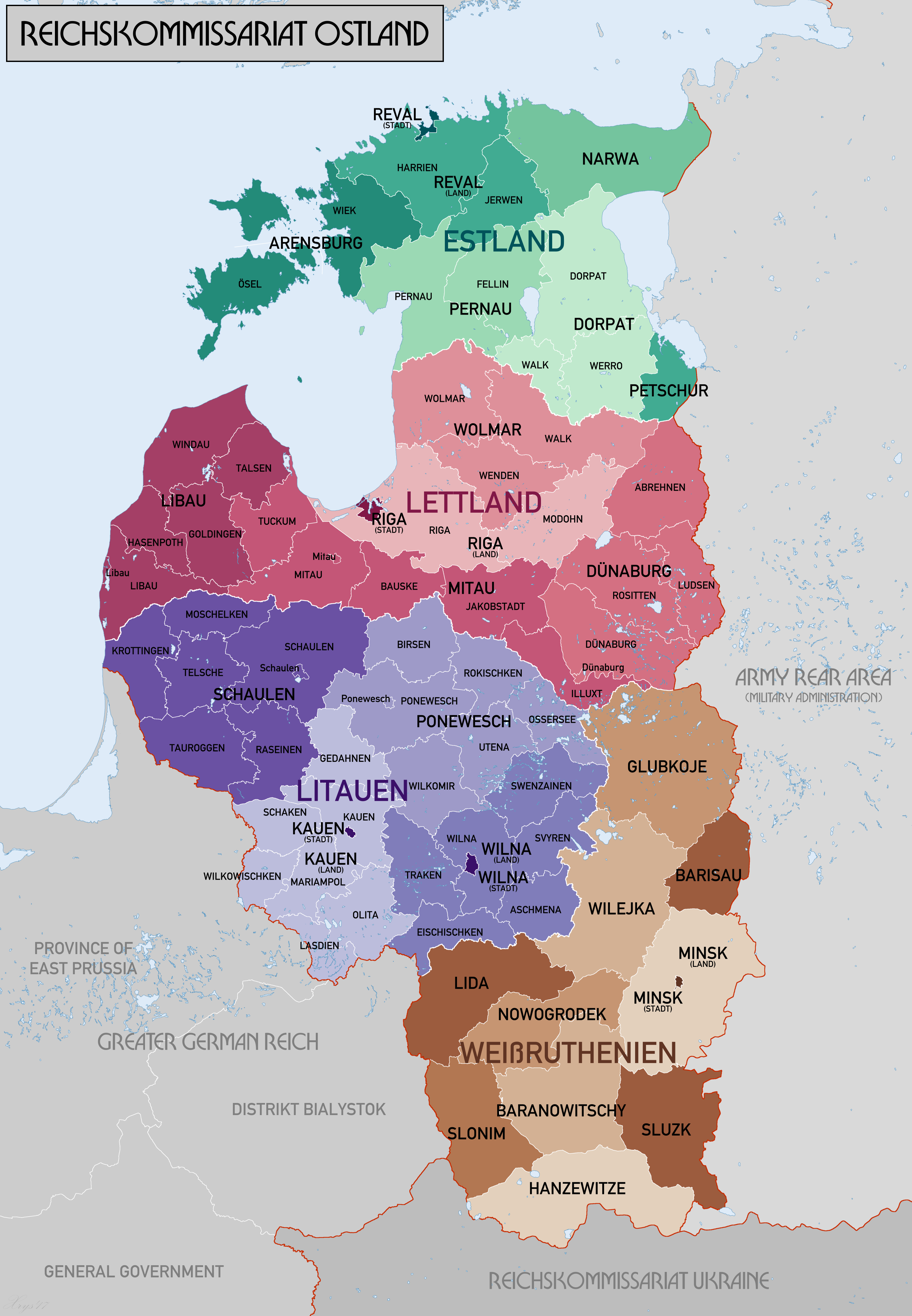
- Map of Generalbezirk Litauen (in shades of purple) within the Reichskommissariat Ostland
- Capital: Kauen
- Area
  - 1942: 67,056 km^{2} (25,890 sq mi)
- Population
  - 1942: 2,844,000
- Government: Civil administration
- Generalkommissar
  - 1941–1944: Theodor Adrian von Renteln
- SS and Police Leader
  - 1941-1943: Lucian Wysocki
  - 1943-1944: Hermann Harm
  - 1944: Kurt Hintze
- Historical era: World War II
  - Established: 25 July 1941
  - Disestablished: 1 August 1944
- Political subdivisions: 6 Kreisgebiete: Kauen-Land; Kauen-Stadt; Ponewesch; Schaulen; Wilna-Land; Wilna-Stadt
Preceded by
Army Group North Rear Area
- Today part of: Lithuania; Belarus

Generalbezirk Litauen (Lithuanian: Lietuvos generalinė sritis, lit. 'General District Lithuania') was an administrative subdivision of the Reichskommissariat Ostland of Nazi Germany that covered Lithuania from 1941 to 1944. It served as the Nazi civilian administration for the German occupation of Lithuania during World War II. Theodor Adrian von Renteln was the only Generalkommissar of Generalbezirk Litauen during its existence.

== Organization and structure ==
Generalbezirk Litauen was established in Lithuania on 25 July 1941, as one of the administrative districts of Reichskommissariat Ostland along with Generalbezirk Lettland. It was organized on the territory of German-occupied Lithuania, which had until then been under the military administration of the Wehrmacht's Army Group North Rear Area. By 1 August 1941, in the wake of further German gains, it expanded to its full extent, when the areas around Vilnius were added. The capital of Generalbezirk Litauen was Kauen (Kaunas).

== Administrative divisions ==
Generalbezirk Litauen had 6 subdivisions called Kreisgebiete (County Areas). The seat of administration is in parentheses.

- Kauen-Land (Kaunas)
- Kauen-Stadt (Kaunas)
- Ponewesch (Panevėžys)
- Schaulen (Šiauliai)
- Wilna-Land (Vilnius)
- Wilna-Stadt (Vilnius)

== Civil and police leadership ==
Civil administration was led by a Generalkommissar (General Commissioner) directly appointed by Adolf Hitler, and who reported to Ostland Reichskommissar Hinrich Lohse, headquartered in Riga. In addition, police and security matters were overseen by an SS and Police Leader (SSPF) directly appointed by Reichsführer-SS Heinrich Himmler, and who reported to the Higher SS and Police Leader (HSSPF) Ostland und Russland-Nord in Riga, SS-Gruppenführer Hans-Adolf Prützmann until 1 November 1941, and SS-Obergruppenführer Friedrich Jeckeln after that date.

- Generalkommissar: Dr. Theodor Adrian von Renteln (25 July 1941 – August 1944).
- SS and Police Leader: SS-Brigadeführer Lucian Wysocki (11 August 1941 – 2 July 1943); SS-Brigadeführer Hermann Harm (2 July 1943 – 8 April 1944); SS-Brigadeführer Kurt Hintze (8 April – 15 September 1944).

== Holocaust ==
Following the German invasion in June 1941, the death squads of Einsatzgruppe A and their Lithuanian collaborators, including the Lithuanian Security Police, immediately began the systematic murder of Lithuanian Jews. Out of approximately 208,000 to 210,000 Jews, an estimated 190,000 to 195,000 were murdered before the end of the war, most between June and December 1941. More than 95% of Lithuania's Jewish population was massacred over the three-year German occupation, representing a more complete destruction than befell any other country affected by the Holocaust.

== Dissolution ==
On 28 July 1944, the Red Army launched the Kaunas offensive as part of Operation Bagration, and Generalbezirk Litauen effectively ceased to exist when the city fell on 1 August. Administration of those parts of Lithuania still under German occupation reverted to military administration of Army Group North under the command of General der Infanterie Johannes Frießner. Renteln disappeared during the German collapse, reportedly being captured by the Red Army and subsequently executed in the Soviet Union in 1946, but this is unconfirmed. According to another account, Renteln managed to successfully escape to South America.

== See also ==
- German occupation of Lithuania during World War II
- The Holocaust in Lithuania
