= Grevenkop =

- Municipality
- Coat of arms

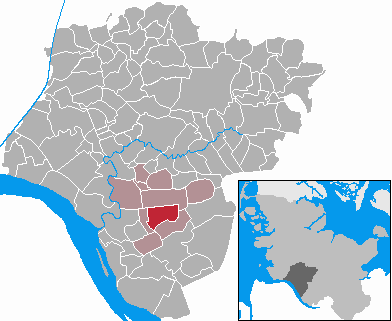
- Location of Grevenkop within Steinburg district
- Interactive map of Grevenkop
- Location within Germany Location within Schleswig-Holstein
- Coordinates: 53°51′N 9°32′E
- Country: Germany
- State: Schleswig-Holstein
- District: Steinburg
- Municipal assoc.: Krempermarsch

Government
  - Mayor: Hans-Otto Schröder

Area
  - Total: 9.63 km^{2} (3.72 sq mi)
- Elevation: 7 m (23 ft)

Population (2025-12-31)
  - Total: 328
  - Density: 34.1/km^{2} (88.2/sq mi)
- Time zone: UTC+01:00 (CET)
  - Summer (DST): UTC+02:00 (CEST)
- Postal codes: 25361
- Dialling codes: 04824
- Vehicle registration: IZ
- Website: www.amt-krempermarsch.de

Grevenkop is a municipality in the district of Steinburg, in Schleswig-Holstein, Germany.
