= Generalbezirk Estland =

Nazi German occupation regime in Estonia 1941-1944

Generalbezirk Estland Estonian: Eesti kindralkomissariaat
- Generalbezirk of Reichskommissariat Ostland
- 1941–1944
- Flag of Nazi Germany Emblem

- Map of Generalbezirk Estland (in shades of green) within the Reichskommissariat Ostland, divided into seven Kreisgebiete ('Circle areas')
- Capital: Reval
- Government: Civil administration
- Generalkommissar
  - 1941-1944: Karl-Siegmund Litzmann
- SS and Police Leader
  - 1941-1944: Hinrich Möller
  - 1944: Walther Schröder
- Historical era: World War II
  - Established: 5 December 1941
  - Dissolved: 17 September 1944
Preceded by
Army Group North Rear Area
- Today part of: Estonia

Generalbezirk Estland (German for "General District Estonia"; Estonian: Eesti kindralkomissariaat) was an administrative subdivision of the Reichskommissariat Ostland of Nazi Germany that covered Estonia from 1941 to 1944. It served as the Nazi civilian administration for the German occupation of Estonia during World War II, and supervised the collaborationist Estonian Self-Administration of Hjalmar Mäe.

Karl-Siegmund Litzmann was the only Generalkommissar of Generalbezirk Estland during its existence.

== Organization and structure ==
Generalbezirk Estland was established in Estonia on 5 December 1941, the last of the four administrative districts of Reichskommissariat Ostland to be formally created. It was organized on the territory of German-occupied Estonia, which had until then been under the military administration of the Wehrmacht's Army Group North Rear Area and its commander Franz von Roques during the German invasion of the Soviet Union. In the autumn of 1941, Roques had begun to form the Estonian Self-Administration, a puppet state composed of Estonian collaborators to govern the country. The ceremony was held to officially transfer power to Hjalmar Mäe of the Estonian Self-Administration and Karl-Siegmund Litzmann of Generalbezirk Estland from Martin Matthiessen, a representative of Hinrich Lohse, the Reichskommissar of Reichskommissariat Ostland.

The capital of Generalbezirk Estland was Reval (Tallinn) and the administration was headquartered at the Kadriorg Palace.

== Administrative divisions ==
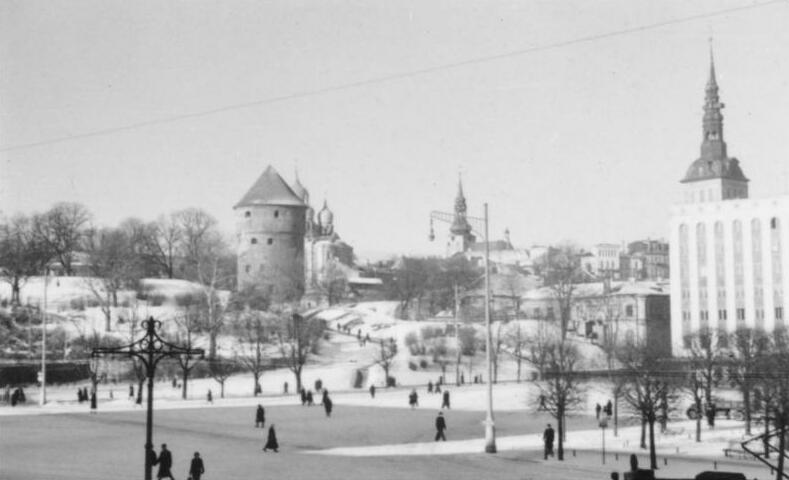
Street scene in Reval (Tallinn), February/March 1942

Generalbezirk Estland had 7 subdivisions called Kreisgebiete (County Areas). The seat of administration is in parentheses.

- Arensburg (Kuressaare)
- Dorpat (Tartu)
- Narwa (Rakvere)
- Pernau (Pärnu)
- Petschur (Pechory)
- Reval-Stadt (Tallinn)
- Reval-Land (Paide)

== Civil and police leadership ==
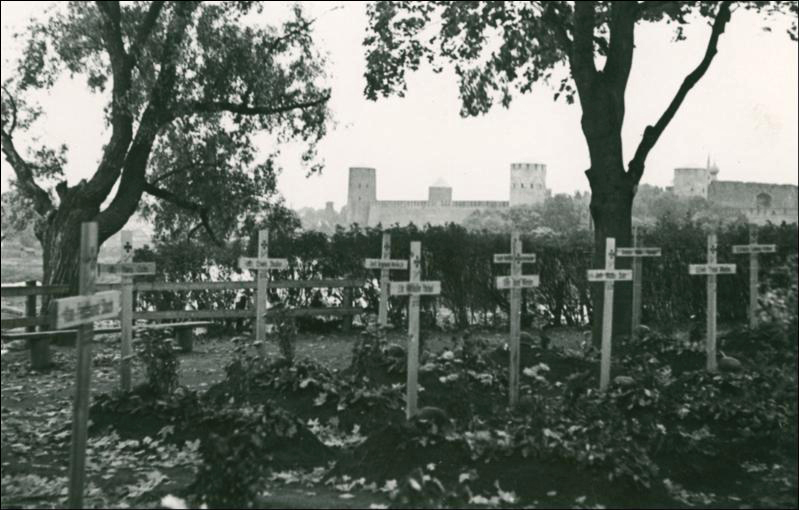
Graves of dead German soldiers in Narva, 1942

Civil administration was led by a Generalkommissar (General Commissioner) directly appointed by Adolf Hitler, and who reported to the Ostland Reichskommissar headquartered in Riga. In addition, police and security matters were overseen by an SS and Police Leader (SSPF) directly appointed by Reichsführer-SS Heinrich Himmler, and who reported to the Higher SS and Police Leader (HSSPF) Ostland und Russland-Nord in Riga, SS-Gruppenführer Hans-Adolf Prützmann until 1 November 1941, and SS-Obergruppenführer Friedrich Jeckeln after that date.

- Generalkommissar: Karl-Siegmund Litzmann (5 December 1941 – 17 September 1944).
- SS and Police Leader: SS-Brigadeführer Hinrich Möller (4 August 1941 – 1 April 1944); SS-Brigadeführer Walther Schröder (1 April 1944 – 19 October 1944).

== Holocaust ==
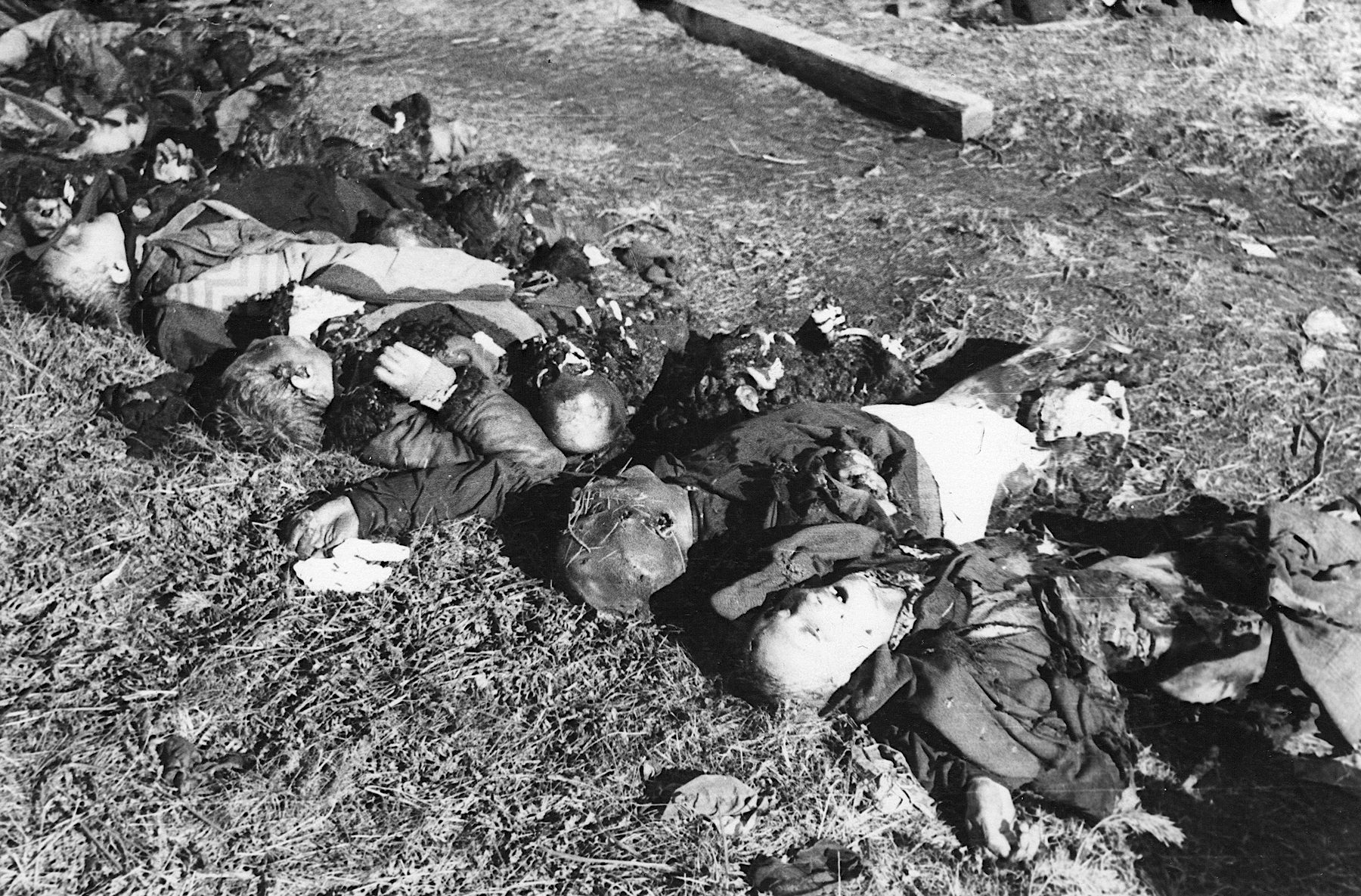
Corpses at Klooga concentration camp, 1944

Following the German invasion in June 1941, the death squads of Einsatzgruppe A and their Estonian collaborators immediately began the systematic murder of Estonian Jews. Approximately 75% of Estonian Jews had fled eastward into the Soviet Union ahead of the Nazi occupation. Virtually all of those who remained (between 950 and 1,000 people) were murdered. The Estonian International Commission for Investigation of Crimes Against Humanity estimated the total number of victims killed in Estonia to be roughly 35,000, including approximately 1,000 Estonian Jews, 10,000 foreign Jews, 1,000 Estonian Romani, 7,000 ethnic Estonians and 15,000 Soviet prisoners of war.

== Dissolution ==
On 11 July 1944, General der Infanterie Johannes Frießner, the commander-in-Chief of Army Group North, issued an order on Hitler's authority by which executive power in Estonia, Latvia and Lithuania was transferred from midnight on 12 July to the commanders-in-chiefs of the army groups. This placed Litzmann under the authority of Frießner and restored military control over Estonia.

On 16 September 1944, Hitler gave permission for German forces to withdraw from mainland Estonia in anticipation of the Red Army launching the Tallinn Offensive. The following day, Litzmann departed for Hungary and Generalbezirk Estland effectively ceased to exist, with administration of those parts of Estonia still under German occupation reverted to the military under Army Group North. Tallinn was abandoned by the German forces on 22 September and fell to the Red Army, who captured the rest of mainland Estonia by 26 September.

== See also ==
- German occupation of Estonia during World War II
- The Holocaust in Estonia
