= Gętomie =

Village in Pomeranian Voivodeship, Poland

- Village
- Location within Poland
- Coordinates: 53°51′52″N 18°41′42″E
- Country: Poland
- Voivodeship: Pomeranian
- County: Tczew
- Gmina: Morzeszczyn

Population (2022)
  - Total: 121
- Time zone: UTC+1 (CET)
  - Summer (DST): UTC+2 (CEST)
- Vehicle registration: GTC

Gętomie [ɡɛnˈtɔmjɛ] is a village in the administrative district of Gmina Morzeszczyn, within Tczew County, Pomeranian Voivodeship, in northern Poland. It is located within the ethnocultural region of Kociewie in the historic region of Pomerania.

== History ==
Gętomie was a private church village of the monastery in Pelplin, administratively located in the Tczew County in the Pomeranian Voivodeship of the Kingdom of Poland.

During the German occupation of Poland (World War II), the occupiers carried out expulsions of Poles, whose farms were handed over to German colonists in accordance with the Lebensraum policy.
