= Estonian Self-Administration =

Puppet government set up during occupation of Estonia by Nazi Germany

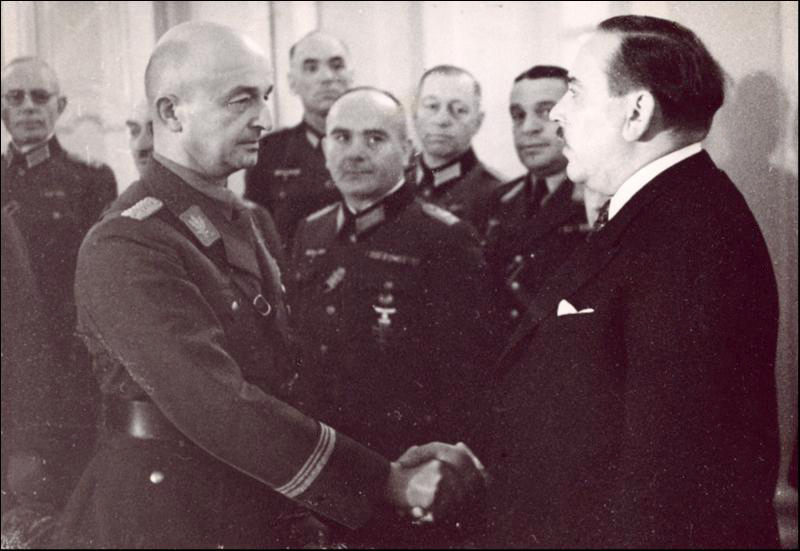
German State Councillor Litzmann and the Head of the Estonian Self-Administration H. Mäe.December 1941

Estonian Self-Administration (Estonian: Eesti Omavalitsus, German: Estnische Selbstverwaltung), also known as the Directorate, was the puppet government set up in Estonia during the occupation of Estonia by Nazi Germany. It was headed by Hjalmar Mäe. The Estonian Self-Administration was subordinated to the administration of Generalbezirk Estland and its directors were appointed by the chief of the Generalbezirk, Commissioner-General Karl-Siegmund Litzmann.

According to the Estonian International Commission for the Investigation of Crimes Against Humanity (referred to as the Commission below),

Although the Directorate did not have complete freedom of action, it exercised a significant measure of autonomy, within the framework of German policy, political, racial and economic. For example, the Directors exercised their powers pursuant to the laws and regulations of the Republic of Estonia, but only to the extent that these had not been repealed or amended by the German military command.

The Commission also found that:

The position of Director was voluntary; there is no evidence that any of the leadership of the Directorate were subject to any form of coercion... The Directorate’s autonomy, in particular, enabled them to maintain police structures that cooperated with the Germans in rounding up and killing Estonian Jews and Roma, and in seeking out and killing Estonians deemed to be opponents of the occupiers, and which were ultimately incorporated into the Security Police. It also extended to the unlawful conscription of Estonians for forced labor or for military service under German command.

== Directors ==
- Hjalmar Mäe (Head of the Directorate)
- Oskar Angelus (Director for Internal Affairs)
- Alfred Wendt (or Vendt) (Director for Economy and Transport)
- Otto Leesment (Director for Social Affairs)
- Hans Saar (Director for Agriculture)
- Oskar Öpik (Director for Justice)
- Arnold Radik (Director for Technology)
- Johannes Soodla (Inspector-General for Estonian Waffen-SS units)

The Commission concluded that the senior officials of the Directorate, by the virtue of their position, share responsibility with the German authorities for all criminal actions carried out in Estonia, and beyond its borders by military units or police battalions raised with their consent.
