= Walter Lehweß-Litzmann =

German officer and Knight's Cross recipient

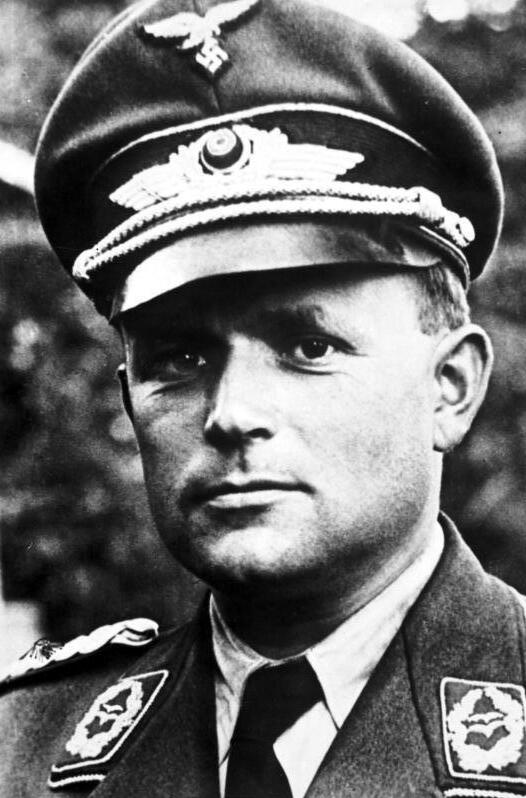
- Lehweß-Litzmann in 1942/43
- Born: 5 June 1907, Bromberg
- Died: 16 September 1986 (aged 79)
- Relatives: Karl Litzmann (grandfather)
- Military career
- Allegiance: Weimar Republic; Nazi Germany; East Germany
- Branch: Luftwaffe; National People's Army; Air Forces of the National People's Army
- Service years: 1925–1945; 1952–1959
- Rank: Oberst
- Units: KG 1, KG 3, Luftflotte 5
- Commands: Kampfgeschwader 3
- Conflicts: World War II
- Awards: Knight's Cross of the Iron Cross
- Other work: Interflug airline

Walter Lehweß-Litzmann (5 June 1907 – 16 September 1986) was a Lieutenant Colonel in the Luftwaffe during World War II, and recipient of the Knight's Cross of the Iron Cross. After the war he served in the National People's Army of the German Democratic Republic, in 1955 CIA identified him as the deputy commander in charge of training for what would become Air Forces of the National People's Army the next year, later worked for the East German airline Interflug.

== Awards and decorations ==
- German Cross in Gold on 16 September 1942 as Oberstleutnant im Generalstab of Luftflotte 5
- Knight's Cross of the Iron Cross on 29 October 1943 as Oberstleutnant and Geschwaderkommodore of Kampfgeschwader 3.

Military offices
Preceded by Major Jobst-Hinrich von Heydebreck	Commander of Kampfgeschwader 3 "Lützow"; January 1943 – 7 September 1943	Succeeded by Major Fritz Auffhammer
