= Hermann Harm =

SS and Police Leader and SS-Brigadeführer

- Born: 30 September 1894; Halle (Saale), Kingdom of Prussia, German Empire
- Died: 28 November 1985 (age 91); Hartenholm, Schleswig-Holstein, West Germany
- Military career
- Allegiance: German Empire; Nazi Germany
- Branch: Imperial German Army; Schutzstaffel
- Service years: 1914–1919; 1932–1945
- Rank: SS-Brigadeführer and Generalmajor of Police
- Commands: SS and Police Leader, "Dnjepropetrovsk-Kriwoi Rog;" "Lithauen"
- Conflicts: World War I World War II
- Awards: Iron Cross, 1st and 2nd class Clasp to the Iron Cross, 1st and 2nd class War Merit Cross, 1st and 2nd class with Swords

Hermann Harm (30 September 1894 – 28 November 1985) was a Nazi German SS-Brigadeführer and a Generalmajor of Police who served as an SS and Police Leader (SSPF) in occupied Ukraine and Lithuania during the Second World War.

== Early life ==
Harm was born in Halle (Saale), the son of a railway inspector. He studied electronics until the outbreak of the First World War in July 1914 when he joined the Imperial German Army. He served in an artillery unit, was commissioned as a Leutnant in September 1915 and earned the Iron Cross, 1st and 2nd class. After the end of the war, he trained in agriculture and became an estate manager. He joined the Nazi Party on 1 February 1930 (membership number 204,385). He also became a member of its paramilitary wing, the Sturmabteilung (SA), on 1 August of the same year and was commissioned an SA-Sturmführer on 15 June 1931.

== Peacetime SS career ==
Harm left the SA to join the SS (SS number 21,342) and was made an SS-Sturmführer on 1 February 1932. From February to December 1932 he led the second Sturmbann (battalion) of the 40th SS-Standarte in Kiel, then until June 1933 he was the commander of the 4th SS-Standarte in Hartenholm. His next posting from 20 March to 2 December 1933, was as Chief of Staff in the SS-Oberabschnitt (Main District) "Nord" (later, "Nordsee") based in Altona, Hamburg. He was then commander of SS-Abschnitt (District) XIV, headquartered in Bremen, until 20 March 1935. He then took a staff position in SS headquarters as Chief of Staff in the Race and Settlement Main Office (RuSHA), remaining there until April 1937. At that time, he was appointed Deputy to SS-Gruppenführer Paul Scharfe in the Gerichtsamt (later, the SS Court Main Office) on the staff of the Reichsführer-SS, Heinrich Himmler. From 15 May 1939 to 1 July 1942 he was Chief of Staff in SS-Oberabschnitt "Nord" ("Ostsee" after 1 February 1940) in Stettin under SS-Gruppenführer Emil Mazuw.

== Second World War ==
In July 1942, Harm was assigned to police duties as SS and Police Leader (SSPF) for Special Assignments in the office of Higher SS and Police Leader (HSSPF) for "Russland-Süd," SS-Obergruppenführer Hans-Adolf Prützmann. On 1 August 1942, Harm took over as SSPF "Dnjepropetrovsk-Kriwoi Rog" where he served until 4 October. Returning to his "Russland-Süd" assignment, his tasks included anti-partisan warfare in the Pripet marshes which was conducted with ruthless brutality. He then left southern Russia on 2 July 1943 for the Generalbezirk Litauen where he was assigned as SSPF "Litauen" until 8 April 1944. There, Harm was involved along with HSSPF "Ostland und Russland Nord" Obergruppenführer Friedrich Jeckeln, in establishing the short-lived Lithuanian Territorial Defense Force, a unit of Lithuanian volunteers to be used in combating the Red Army and in anti-partisan activities. Returning to Reichskommissariat Ukraine, Harm served again under Prützmann through October 1944. His last position from 1 November 1944 to the end of the war in Europe on 8 May 1945, was in Salzburg as Acting HSSPF "Alpenland" and Acting commander of Oberabschnitt "Alpenland," as the permanent Deputy to Obergruppenführer Erwin Rösener, who was detailed to Slovenia as head of the anti-partisan campaign there.

After the end of the war, Harm worked as a farmer in Schleswig-Holstein. He died on 28 November 1985 in Hartenholm.

SS and Police Ranks
Date	Rank
February 1932	SS-Sturmführer
April 1932	SS-Sturmhauptführer
December 1932	SS-Sturmbannführer
June 1933	SS-Obersturmbannführer
November 1933	SS-Standartenführer
April 1934	SS-Oberführer
September 1936	SS-Brigadeführer
September 1942	Generalmajor of Police

== Awards ==
- Iron Cross (1914) 1st and 2nd class
- Clasp to the Iron Cross 1st and 2nd class
- War Merit Cross 1st and 2nd class

== Sources ==
- Klee, Ernst (2007). Das Personenlexikon zum Dritten Reich. Wer war was vor und nach 1945. Frankfurt-am-Main: Fischer-Taschenbuch-Verlag. ISBN 978-3-596-16048-8.
- Schiffer Publishing Ltd., ed. (2000). SS Officers List: SS-Standartenführer to SS-Oberstgruppenführer (As of 30 January 1942). Schiffer Military History Publishing. ISBN 0-7643-1061-5.
- Yerger, Mark C. (1997). Allgemeine-SS: The Commands, Units and Leaders of the General SS. Schiffer Publishing Ltd. ISBN 0-7643-0145-4.
