= Hjalmar Mäe =

Estonian politician (1901–1978)

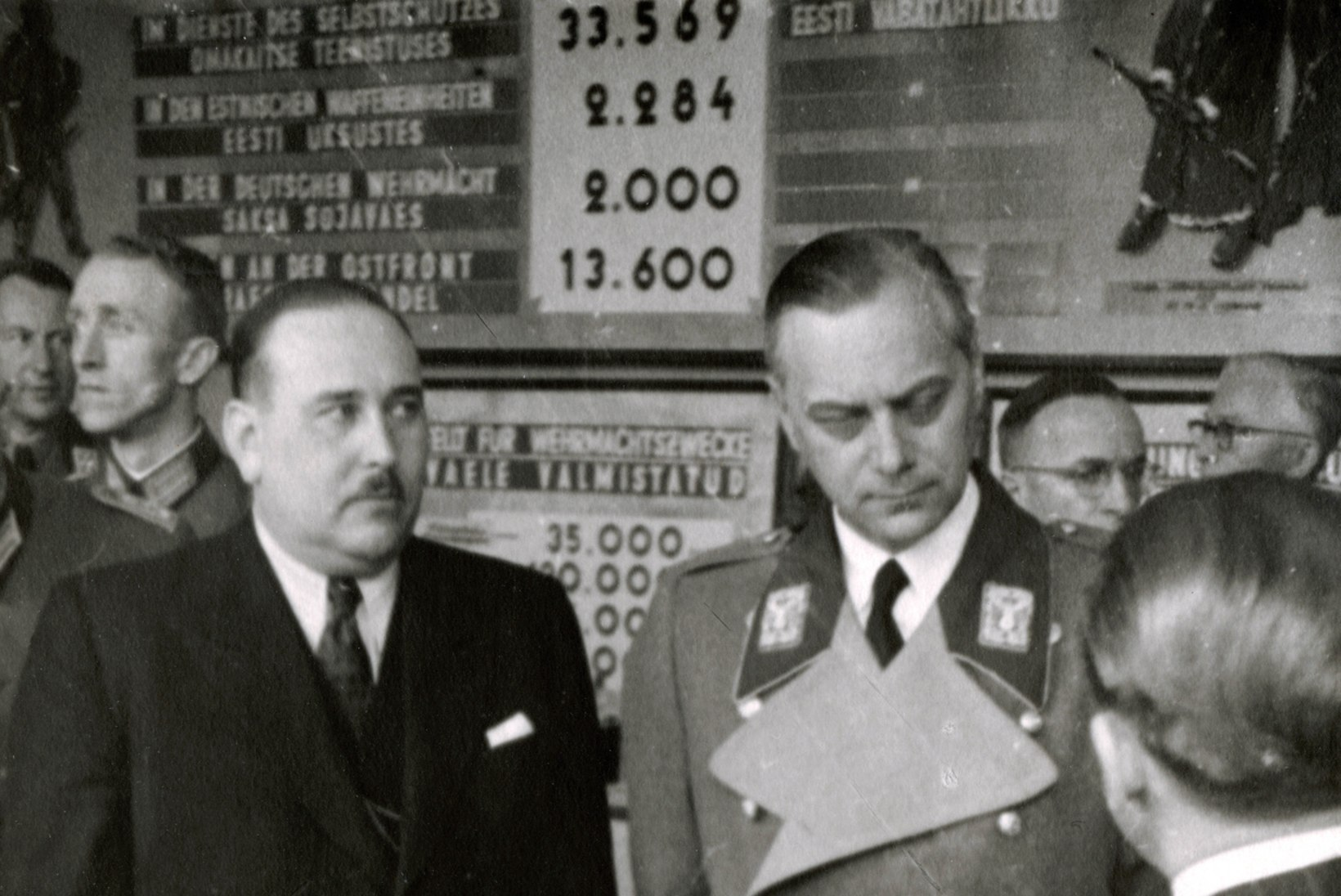
- Hjalmar Mäe (left) with Alfred Rosenberg, 1942

Director-General of the Estonian Self-Administration
- In office 1941–1944
- Preceded by: Office established
- Succeeded by: Office abolished

Personal details
- Born: 24 October 1901 Tuhala, Harrien County, Governorate of Estonia, Russian Empire
- Died: 10 April 1978 (aged 76) Graz, Austria
- Education: University of Innsbruck (Dr. phil.); University of Graz (Dr. rer. pol.)

Hjalmar-Johannes Mäe (24 October [O.S. 11 October] 1901 – 10 April 1978) was an Estonian politician and Nazi collaborator. In 1941–1944 he headed the Estonian Self-Administration, a puppet government set up during the country's occupation by Nazi Germany during World War II.

== Biography ==
After studies in Berlin, Vienna and Innsbruck, Mäe graduated with doctoral degrees in geophysics from the University of Innsbruck in 1927, and in constitutional law from the University of Graz in 1930.

Mäe was twice a candidate to the Riigikogu, in the 1929 Estonian parliamentary election as a Landlords' Party candidate and in the 1932 Estonian parliamentary election as a National Centre Party candidate. He later joined the Vaps Movement, for which he was arrested during the government of Konstantin Päts. In 1935 Mäe was sentenced to 20 years of hard labour, but was released under a 1938 amnesty law and moved to Nazi Germany.

Mäe returned to Estonia with the German armies in 1941 and was made head of the Estonian Self-Administration, a puppet government set up by the Germans. In 1944 he fled the advancing Red Army to Austria where he was cleared of Nazi crimes by the Western Allies, and later would serve as an advisor to the Austrian government.
