= Illuka Parish =

Former municipality of Estonia

Coordinates: 59°12′N 27°32′E

Illuka Parish Illuka vald
- Former municipality of Estonia
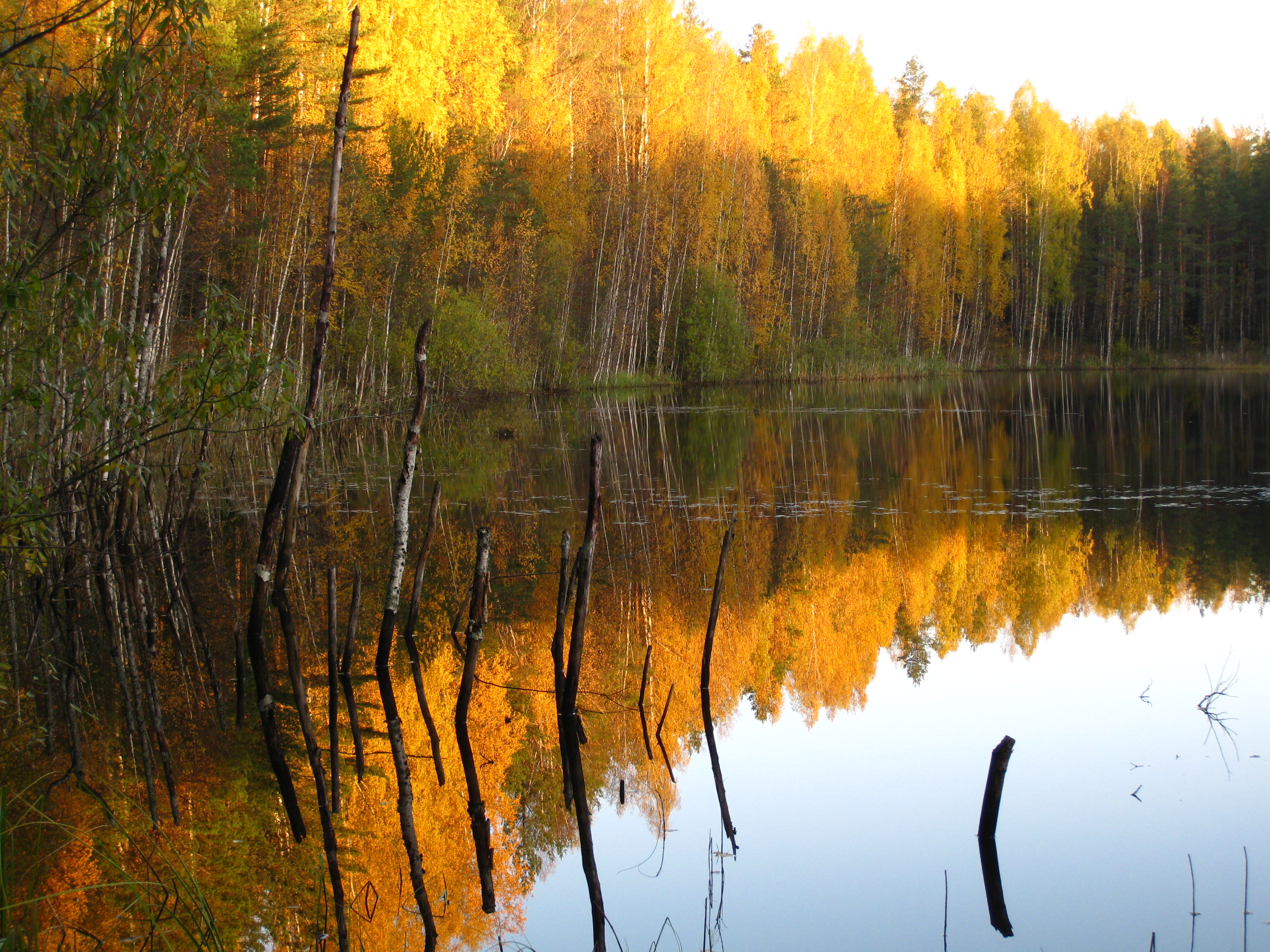
- Lake Kuradijärv

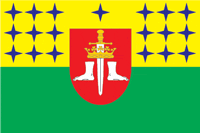
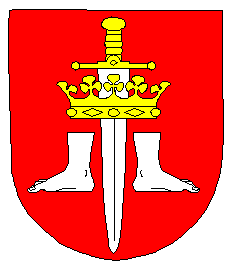
- Flag Coat of arms

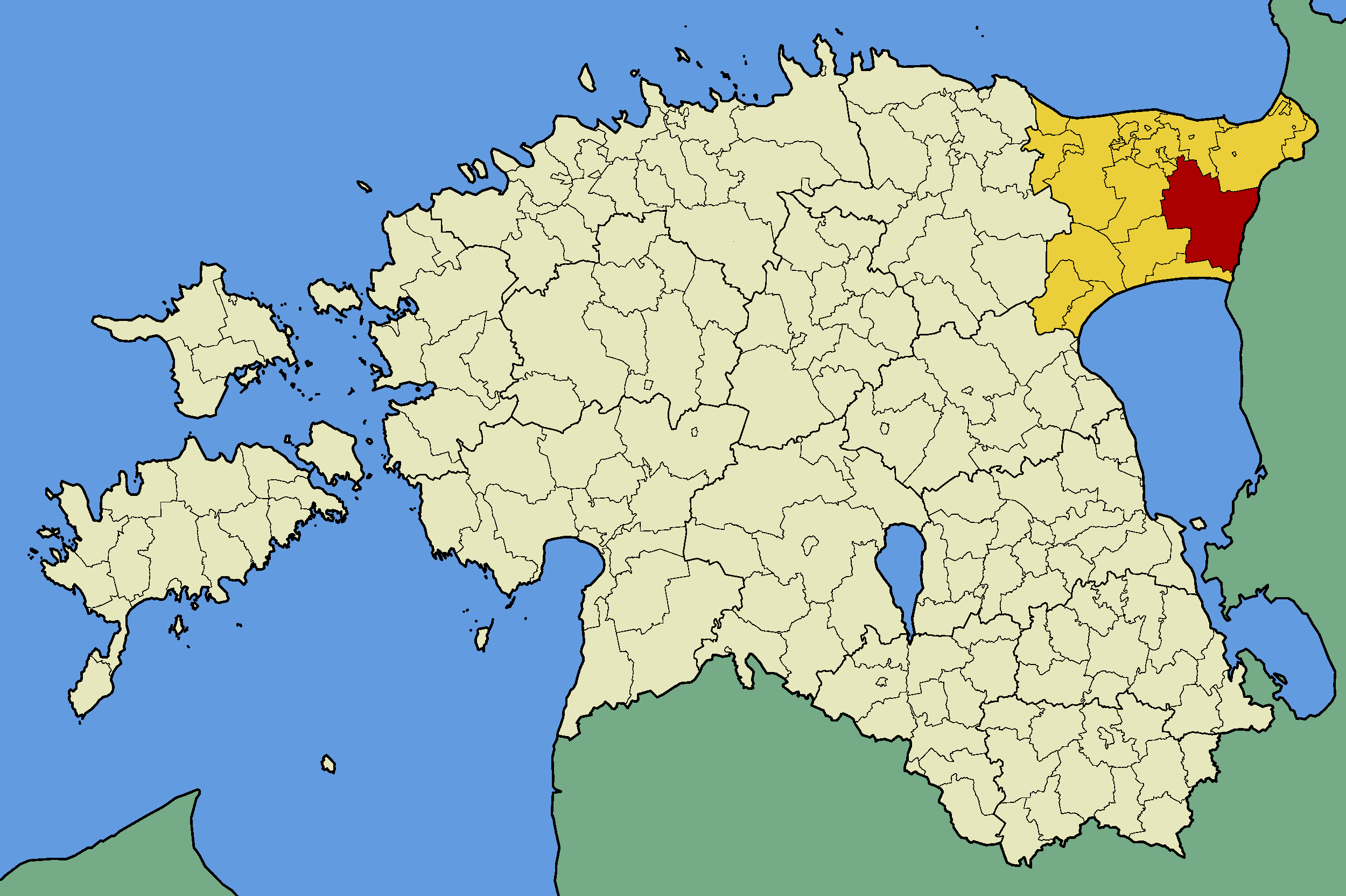
- Illuka Parish within Ida-Viru County.
- Country: Estonia
- County: Ida-Viru County
- Administrative centre: Illuka

Area
  - Total: 517 km^{2} (200 sq mi)

Population
  - Total: 1,013
  - Density: 1.96/km^{2} (5.07/sq mi)
- Website: www.illukavv.ee

Illuka Parish (Estonian: Illuka vald) was an Estonian municipality located in Ida-Viru County. It had a population of 1,013 and an area of 517 km^{2}.

== Villages ==
The villages are: Agusalu, Edivere, Illuka, Jaama, Kaatermu, Kaidma, Kamarna, Karoli, Kuremäe, Kivinõmme, Konsu, Kuningaküla, Kurtna, Ohakvere, Ongassaare, Permisküla, Puhatu, Rausvere, and Vasavere.

== History ==
Illuka Parish was formed on 13 February 1992.

In 2017, as part of Administrative reform in Estonia, Illuka Parish, along with Alajõe Parish, Iisaku Parish, Mäetaguse Parish and Tudulinna Parish, were merged into a new administrative unit - Alutaguse Parish. Illuka Municipal Council did not do so willingly and disputed the forced merger in Supreme Court of Estonia, but lost the case.

== International relations ==
=== Twin towns — Sister cities ===
- Duszniki, Poland
- Taivalkoski, Finland

== Gallery ==
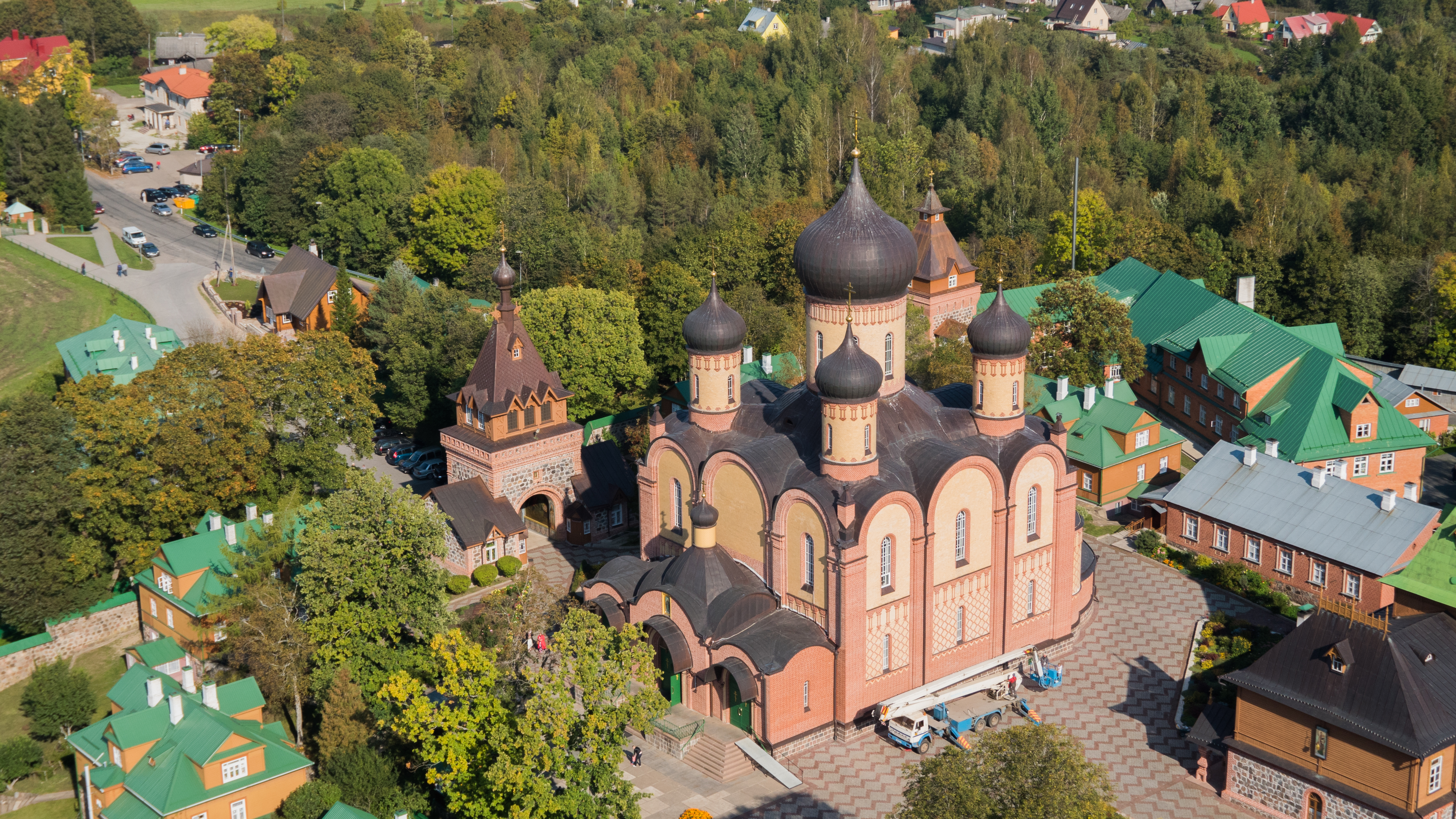
Pühtitsa Convent

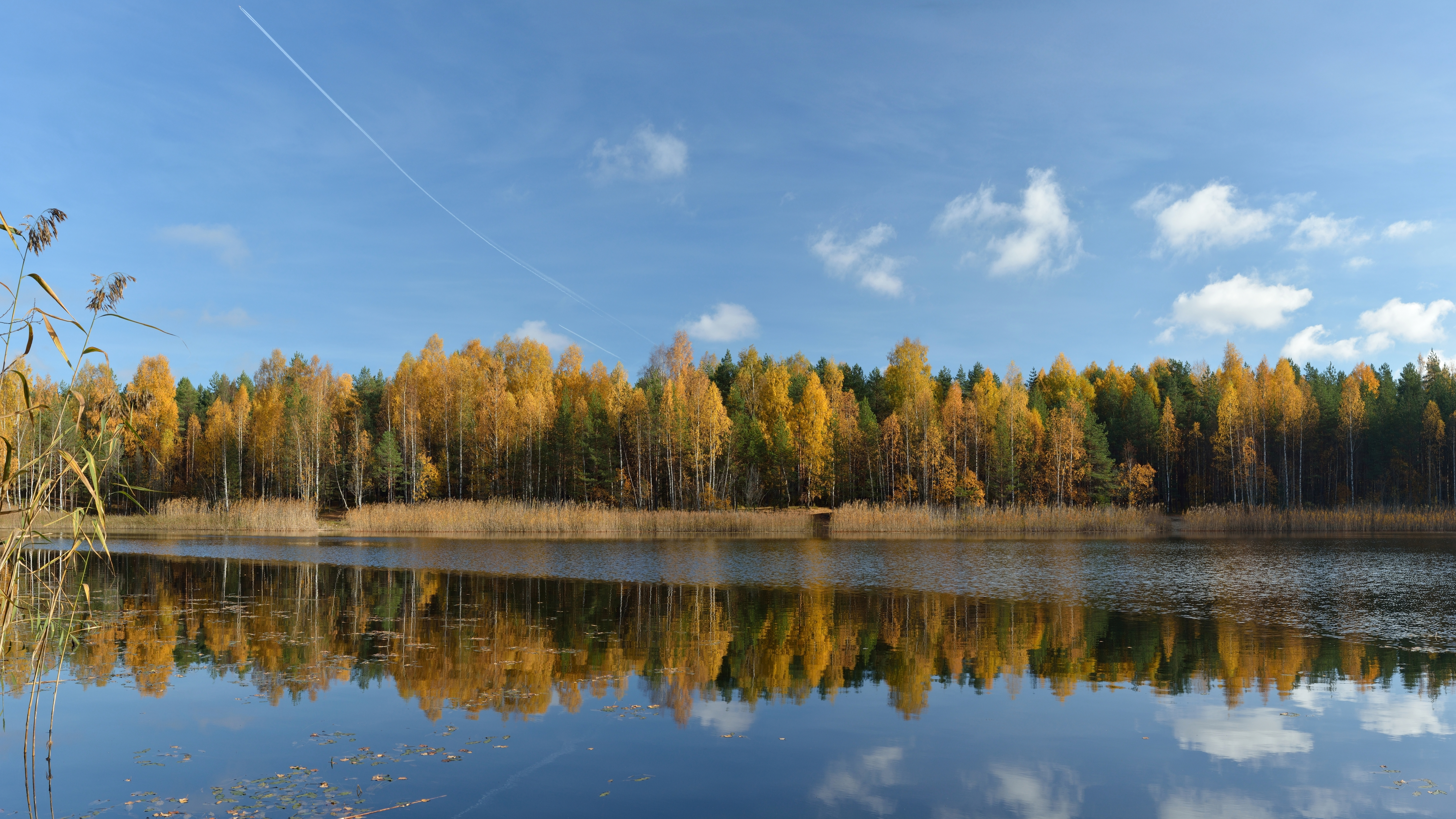
Lake Martiska

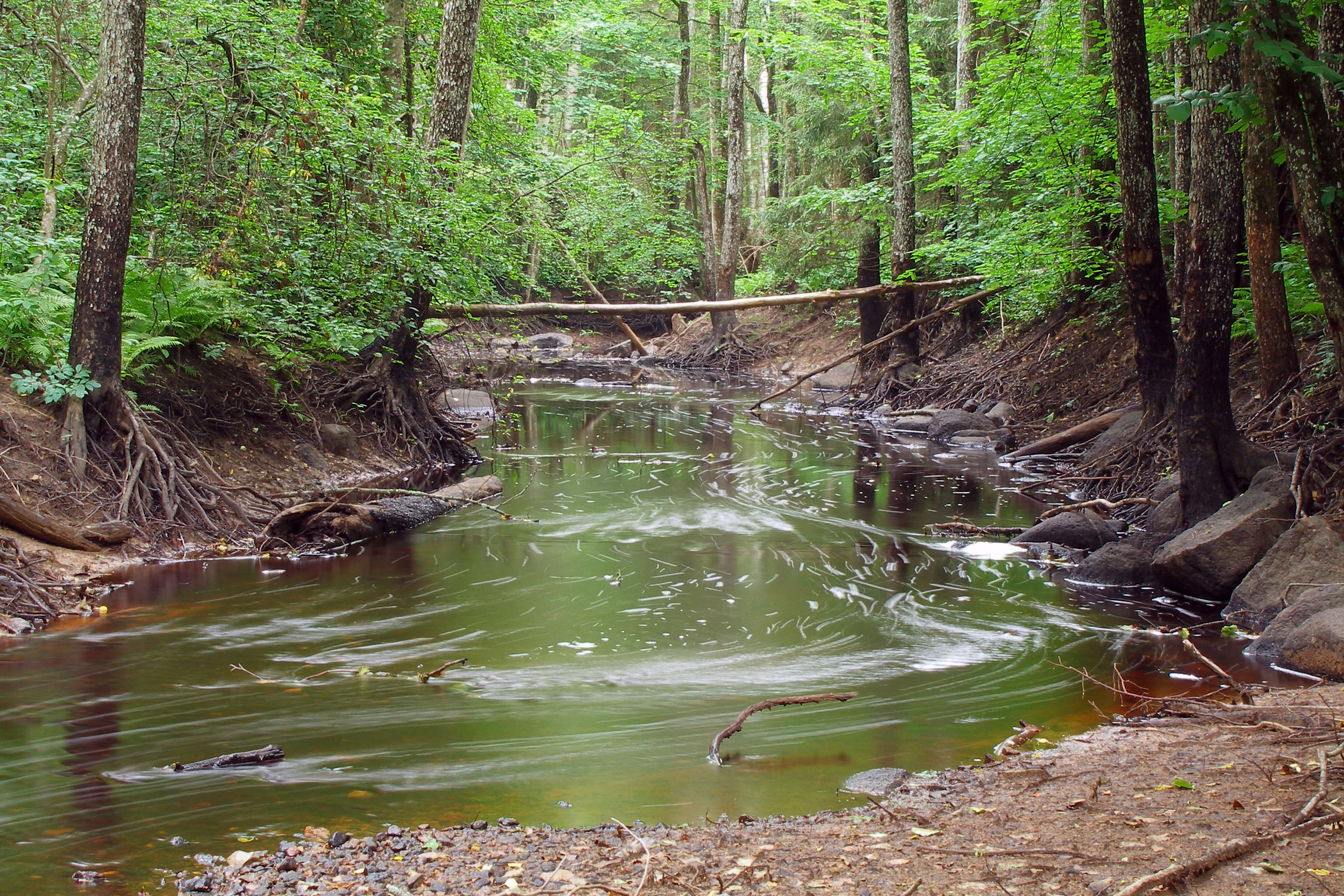
Poruni river

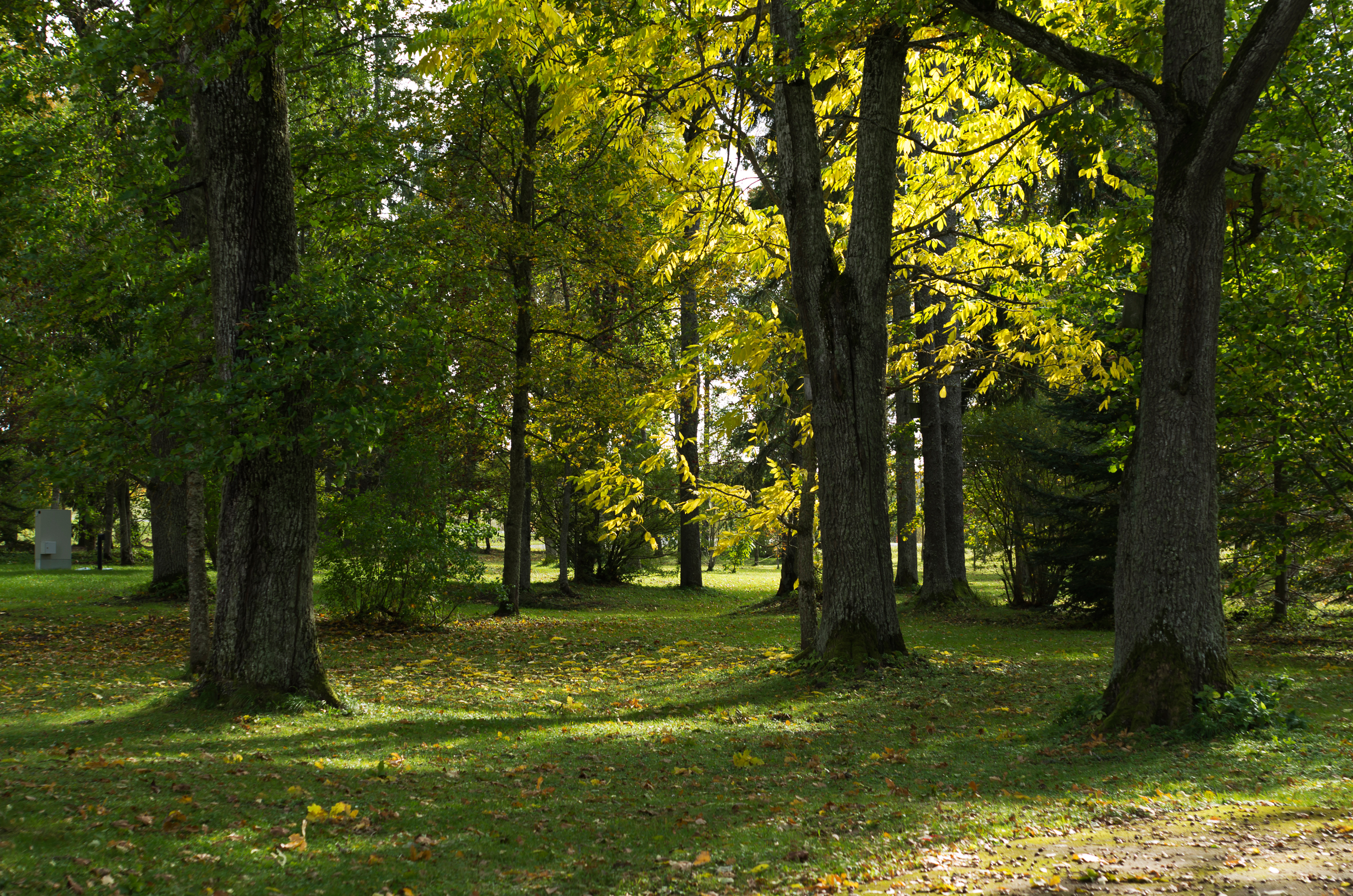
Illuka manor park

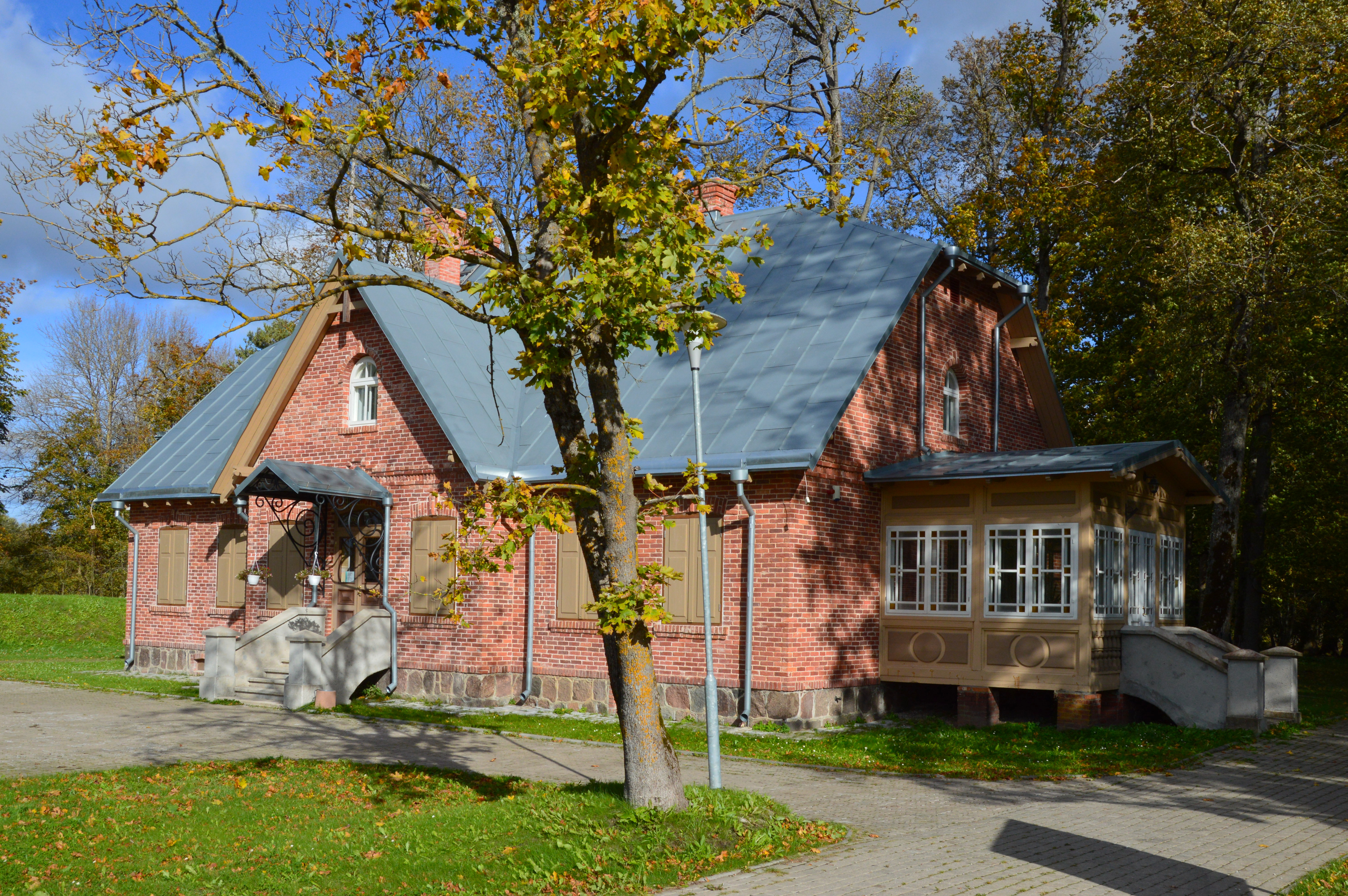
Kurtna manor steward's house
