= Kuningaküla =

Village in Estonia

Coordinates: 59°07′N 27°47′E

- Village
- Interactive map of Kuningaküla
- Country: Estonia
- County: Ida-Viru County
- Parish: Alutaguse Parish

Population (2021)
  - Total: 26
- Time zone: UTC+2 (EET)
  - Summer (DST): UTC+3 (EEST)

Kuningaküla (Note: Russian: Кунингакюла, romanized: Kuningakyula or Князь-Село, Knyaz-Selo) is a village in Alutaguse Parish, Ida-Viru County in northeastern Estonia, located on the western bank of the Narva River near the border with Russia. Until 2017, it was part of the Illuka Parish. At the time of the 2021 census, Kuningaküla had a population of 26.

== Geography ==
Kuningaküla borders Mustanina in the north, Russia in the east, Permisküla in the south, Agusalu in the southwest and Puhatu in the west. The Russian villages of Stepanovshchina and Otradnoye (formerly Omut) lie on the opposite side of the Narva. Two tributaries of the river flow within the village's territory: Poruni jõgi and Gorodenka oja.

Kuningaküla and Permisküla have been designated as a locally valuable landscape area due to their distinctive structure and architecture. The villages are populated mainly by ethnic Russians.

== History ==
Burial mounds dated to the 11th or 12th century, associated with Votic settlement, are found near modern Kuningaküla.

Kuningaküla was first mentioned in 1583 as Kunningekyll. The name contains the word kuningas 'king', which may be an old personal name or a reference to a free peasant's farm. The village had 15 houses before the Great Northern War.

Kuningaküla had 166 inhabitants in 1858. The main livelihoods at the time were fishing and timber rafting. By 1922, the population had increased to 370 and the village had its own school established in 1904 as well as a chapel. Logging and fishing remained important, as fields in the village were small and could only support subsistence agriculture.

Two former villages are located near modern Kuningaküla: Vallisaare, which was abandoned after World War II, and Gorodenka, which was consolidated with Kuningaküla in 1977.
