= 1658 =

1658 in various calendars
- Gregorian calendar: 1658; MDCLVIII
- Ab urbe condita: 2411
- Armenian calendar: 1107; ԹՎ ՌՃԷ
- Assyrian calendar: 6408
- Balinese saka calendar: 1579–1580
- Bengali calendar: 1064–1065
- Berber calendar: 2608
- English Regnal year: 9 Cha. 2 – 10 Cha. 2 (Interregnum)
- Buddhist calendar: 2202
- Burmese calendar: 1020
- Byzantine calendar: 7166–7167
- Chinese calendar: 丁酉年 (Fire Rooster); 4355 or 4148 — to — 戊戌年 (Earth Dog); 4356 or 4149
- Coptic calendar: 1374–1375
- Discordian calendar: 2824
- Ethiopian calendar: 1650–1651
- Hebrew calendar: 5418–5419
- Hindu calendars
- Vikram Samvat: 1714–1715
- Shaka Samvat: 1579–1580
- Kali Yuga: 4758–4759
- Holocene calendar: 11658
- Igbo calendar: 658–659
- Iranian calendar: 1036–1037
- Islamic calendar: 1068–1069
- Japanese calendar: Meireki 4 / Manji 1 (万治元年)
- Javanese calendar: 1580–1581
- Julian calendar: Gregorian minus 10 days
- Korean calendar: 3991
- Minguo calendar: 254 before ROC 民前254年
- Nanakshahi calendar: 190
- Thai solar calendar: 2200–2201
- Tibetan calendar: མེ་མོ་བྱ་ལོ་ (female Fire-Bird); 1784 or 1403 or 631 — to — ས་ཕོ་ཁྱི་ལོ་ (male Earth-Dog); 1785 or 1404 or 632

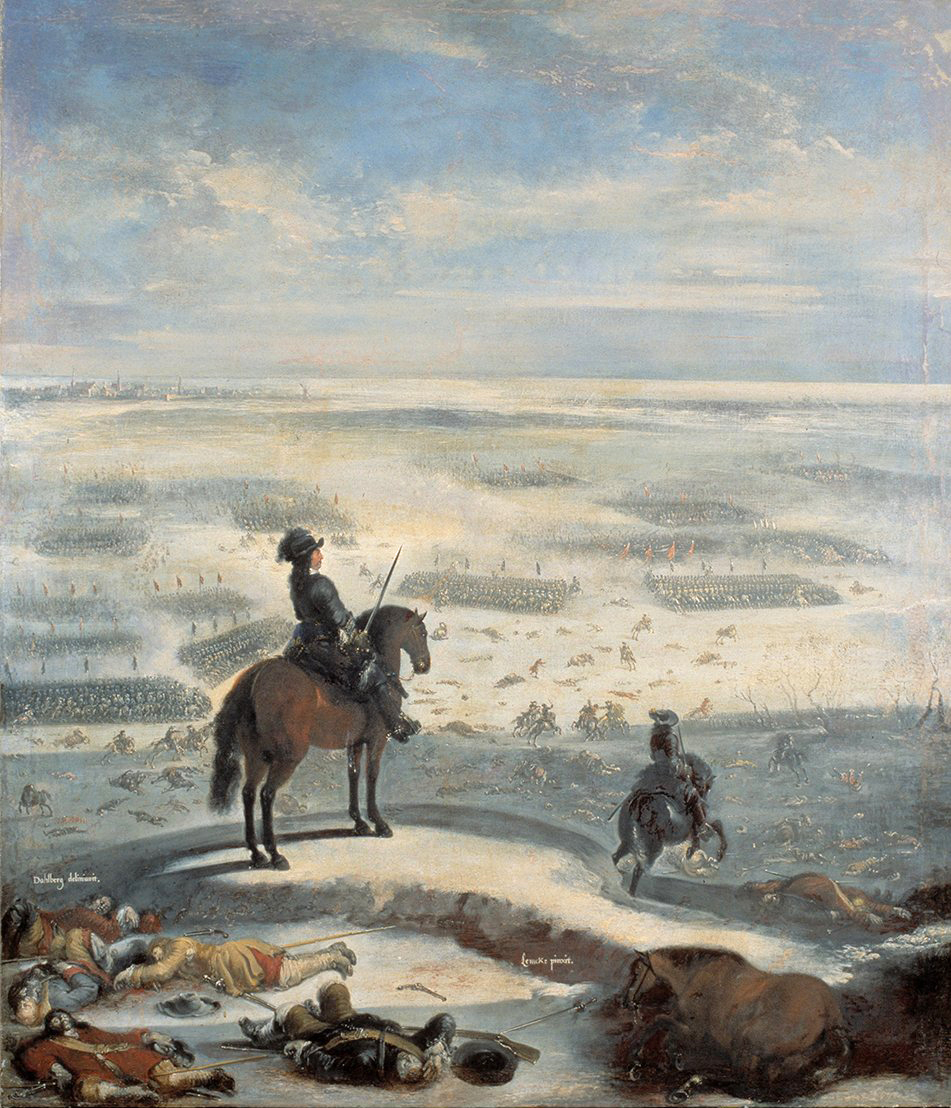
January 30: Swedish troops cross the frozen waters of the Danish Straits on foot in the March Across the Belts

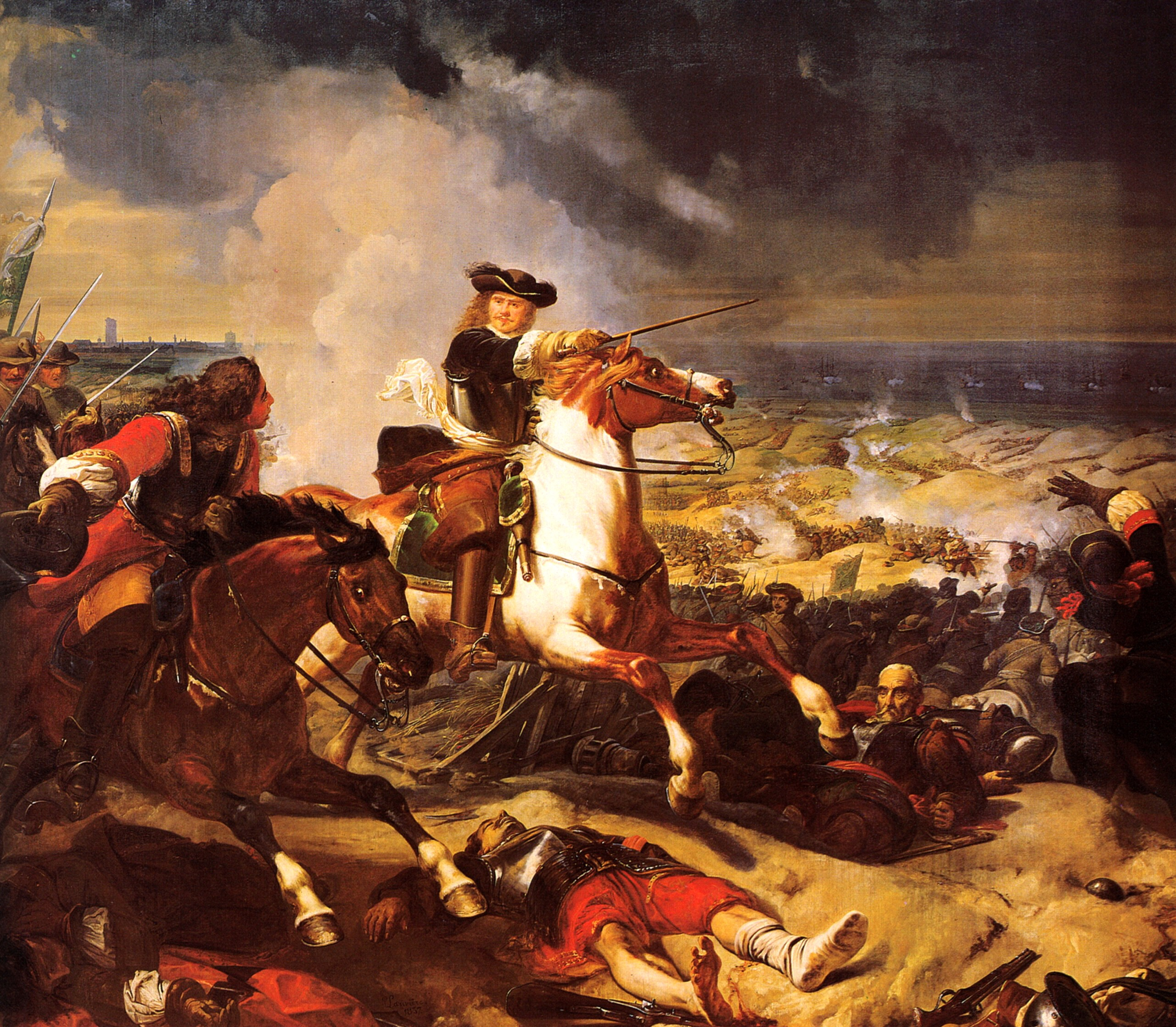
June 14: Battle of the Dunes

1658 (MDCLVIII) was a common year starting on Tuesday of the Gregorian calendar and a common year starting on Friday of the Julian calendar, the 1658th year of the Common Era (CE) and Anno Domini (AD) designations, the 658th year of the 2nd millennium, the 58th year of the 17th century, and the 9th year of the 1650s decade. As of the start of 1658, the Gregorian calendar was 10 days ahead of the Julian calendar, which remained in localized use until 1923.

== Events ==
=== January–March ===
- January 13 – Edward Sexby, who had plotted against Oliver Cromwell, dies in the Tower of London.
- January 30 – The "March Across the Belts" (Tåget över Bält), Sweden's use of winter weather to send troops across the waters of the Danish Straits at a time when winter has turned them to ice, begins. Within 17 days, Sweden's King Karl X Gustav leads troops across the ice belts to capture six of Denmark's islands as Swedish territory.
- February 5 – Prince Muhi al-Din Muhammad, one of the sons of India's Mughal, Emperor Shah Jahan, proclaims himself Emperor after Jahan names Muhi's older brother, Dara Shikoh, as regent, and departs from Aurangabad with troops.
- February 6 – Swedish troops of Charles X Gustav of Sweden cross The Great Belt in Denmark, over frozen sea.
- March 8 (February 26 OS) – The peace between Sweden and Denmark-Norway is concluded in Roskilde by the Treaty of Roskilde, under which Denmark is forced to cede significant territory. This leads to Sweden reaching its territorial height during its time as a great power.

=== April–June ===
- April 15 – In India, the Battle of Dharmat is fought in the modern-day state of Madhya Pradesh between rival claimants to the throne of the Mughal Empire. Prince Muhi al-Din Muhammad, the son of the Emperor Shah Jahan, leads 30,000 men in a triumph over 22,000 troops led by Jaswant Singh of Marwar and Ratan Singh Rathore. Despite heavy losses, with more than 11,000 casualties, Prince Muhi, who has adopted the name Aurangzeb, continues toward Samugarh and Agra and captures the throne at the end of July.
- April 16 – In Skåneland, a region recently ceded by Denmark to the Swedish Empire, representatives of the nobility of the provinces of Blekinge, Halland and Scania gather at the Scanian city of Malmö to swear their allegiance to King Charles X Gustav of Sweden.
- May 1 – Hydriotaphia, Urn Burial and The Garden of Cyrus are published by Thomas Browne in England.
- May 29 – Aurangzeb wins the Battle of Samugarh as Indian Mughal regent Dara Shikoh makes a last effort to defend the Mughal capital Agra.
- June 3 – Pope Alexander VII appoints François de Laval vicar apostolic of New France.
- June 14 – Anglo-Spanish War (1654–1660) and Franco-Spanish War (1635–1659): In the Battle of the Dunes, a Spanish force attempting to lift a siege of Dunkirk is defeated by the French and English. England is then given Dunkirk, for its assistance in the victory.
- June 25–27 – In the Battle of Rio Nuevo, part of the Anglo-Spanish War, a Spanish invasion force fails to recapture Jamaica from the English.

=== July–September ===
- July 2 – The Siege of Toruń begins in Poland as troops of the Polish–Lithuanian Commonwealth and of Austria seek to recapture the city of Toruń from a garrison of the Swedish Army. Within six months, the Swedish occupiers surrender.
- July 18 – Prince Leopold of the House of Habsburg, son of the late Ferdinand III, is elected as the new Holy Roman Emperor.
- July 31 – After Shah Jahan completes the Taj Mahal, his son Aurangzeb deposes him as ruler of the Mughal Empire.
- July – Šarhūda's Manchu fleet annihilates Onufriy Stepanov's Russian flotilla, on the Amur River.
- August 1 – The coronation of Leopold I takes place in Frankfurt.
- August 5 – Just six months after winning territory from Denmark-Norway in war and subsequent treaty, Sweden's King Charles X Gustav declares a second war against Denmark. By August 11, the King's troops have surrounded Denmark's capital, Copenhagen, while the Swedish Navy blocks the harbor to prevent the city from being resupplied, and begins bombardment.
- August 14 – The League of the Rhine (Rheinische Allianz) is formed by 50 German princes whose cities are on the Rhine river.
- September 3 – Oliver Cromwell dies and his son Richard assumes his father's position as Lord Protector of England, Scotland and Ireland.
- September 17 – Portuguese Restoration War: In the Battle of Vilanova, a Spanish army, having crossed the Minho, defeats the Portuguese.

=== October–December ===
- October 7 – The Netherlands enters the Dano-Swedish War to come to the rescue of Denmark, sending a 45-ship fleet from Vlie.
- October 29 – The 45-ship fleet of the Netherlands arrives at Denmark and begins its counterattack on Sweden's army and navy with three squadrons.
- November 6 – The Mexican Inquisition carries out the execution, by public burning, of 14 men convicted of homosexuality, while another 109 arrested are either released or given less harsh sentences.
- November 8 (October 29 old style) – The Battle of the Sound takes place between the navies of the Dutch Republic (with 41 warships) and of Sweden (with 45) at the Øresund, a strait between Denmark and Sweden's newly-acquired territory, the former Danish island of Scania. The Dutch Republic is successful at breaking the Swedish Navy's blockade of Copenhagen, and Sweden is forced to retreat, bringing an end to the attempted conquest of Denmark.
- November 23 – The elaborate funeral of Lord Protector of England Oliver Cromwell (who had died on September 3 and was buried at Westminster Abbey two weeks later) is carried out in London. A little more than two years later (in January 1661), his body will be disinterred and his head severed and placed on a spike.
- December 11 – Abaza Hasan Pasha, an Ottoman provincial governor who is attempting to depose the Grand Vizier, wins a battle at the Turkish city of Ilgin, defeating loyalist forces led by Murtaza Pasha. The victory is the last for the rebels. Two months later (February 16, 1659) Abaza Hasan is assassinated after being invited to peace negotiations by the loyalists.
- December 20 – Representatives of the Russian Empire and the Swedish Empire sign the Treaty of Valiesar at the Valiesar Estate near Narva, part of modern-day Estonia. In return for ceasing hostilities between the two empires in the Second Northern War, Russia is allowed to keep captured territories in Livonia (part of modern-day Latvia) for a term of three years.
- December 25 – Polish and Danish forces defeat a Swedish Army in the Battle of Kolding in Denmark.
- December 30 – The Siege of Toruń ends almost six months after it started, with Poland recapturing the city from Sweden.

=== Date unknown ===
- Portuguese traders are expelled from Ceylon by Dutch invaders.
- The Dutch in the Cape Colony start to import slaves from India and South-East Asia (later from Madagascar).

== Births ==
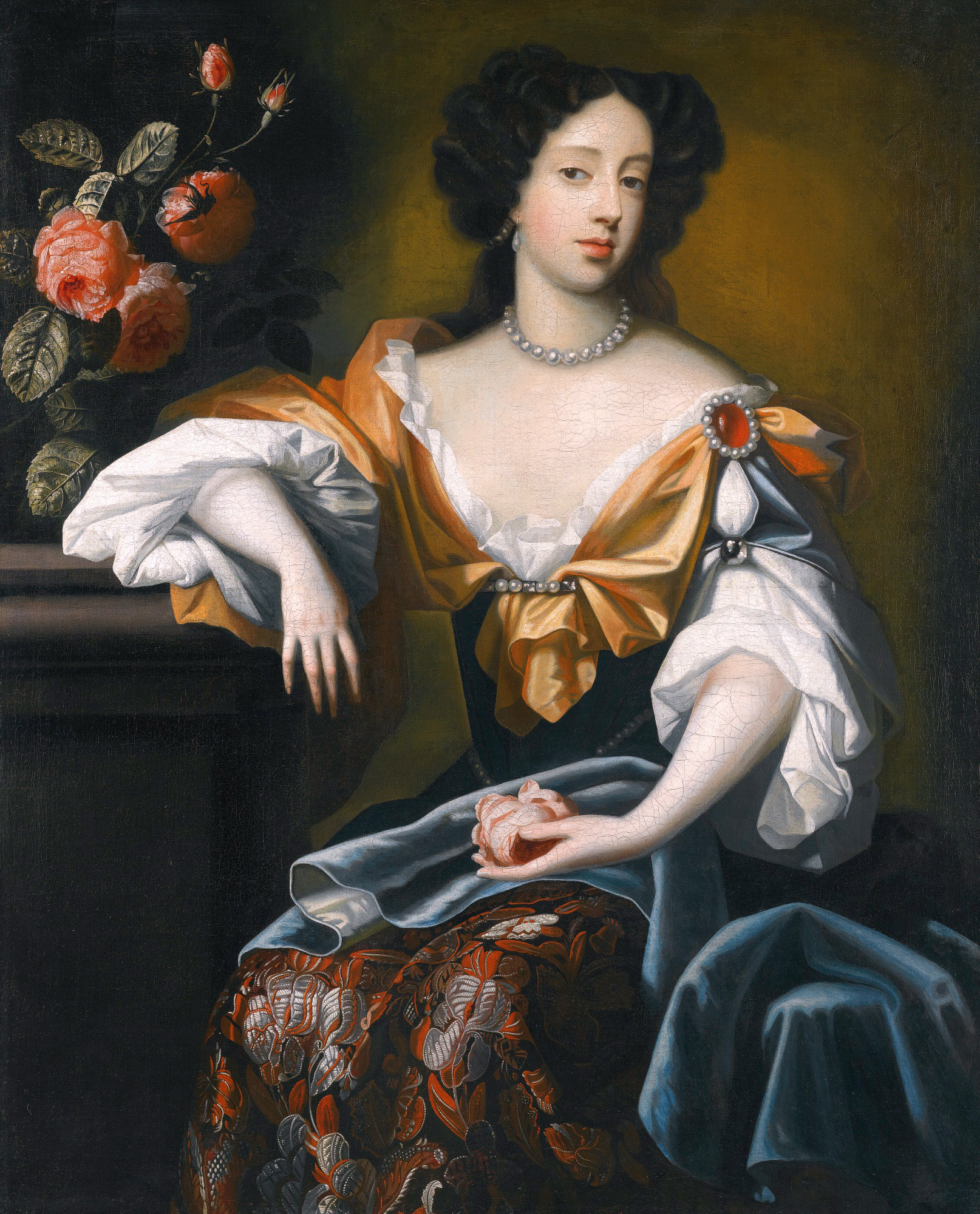
Mary of Modena

- January 9 – Nicolas Coustou, French artist (d. 1733)
- January 17 – Samson Wertheimer, European rabbi (d. 1724)
- January 17 – Francis Seymour, 5th Duke of Somerset (d. 1678)
- February 18 – Charles-Irénée Castel de Saint-Pierre, French writer (d. 1743)
- March 5 – Antoine de la Mothe Cadillac, French explorer (d. 1730)
- March 8 – Thomas Trevor, 1st Baron Trevor, British Baron (d. 1730)
- March 23 – Jean-Baptiste Santerre, French painter (d. 1717)
- March 30 – Muro Kyūsō, Japanese Neo-Confucian scholar (d. 1734)
- April 11 – James Hamilton, 4th Duke of Hamilton, Scottish peer (d. 1712)
- April 19 – Johann Wilhelm, Elector Palatine, German noble (d. 1716)
- April 22 – Giuseppe Torelli, Italian violist, violinist, pedagogue and composer (d. 1709)
- May 30 – Sir Henry Furnese, 1st Baronet, English merchant and politician (d. 1712)
- June 10 – John March, Massachusetts businessman, colonel (d. 1712)
- June 11 – Victor Honoré Janssens, Flemish painter (d. 1736)
- June 22 – Louis VII, Landgrave of Hesse-Darmstadt (d. 1678)
- July 10 – Luigi Ferdinando Marsili, Italian soldier and naturalist (d. 1730)
- July 14 – Camillo Rusconi, Italian artist (d. 1728)
- July 17 – Diogo de Mendonça Corte-Real, Portuguese politician (d. 1736)
- July 21 – Alexis Littré, French physician and anatomist (d. 1726)
- July 25 – Archibald Campbell, 1st Duke of Argyll, Scottish privy councillor (d. 1703)
- July 28 – Roelof Diodati, Dutch Governor of Mauritius (d. 1723)
- August 1 – Pierre Joseph Garidel, French botanist (d. 1737)
- August 5 – Claude Audran III, French painter (d. 1734)
- August 10 – Susanne Maria von Sandrart, German engraver (d. 1716)
- August 11 – Sir Justinian Isham, 4th Baronet, English baronet and Member of Parliament (d. 1730)
- August 16 – Jan Frans van Son, Flemish Baroque painter (d. 1704)
- August 16 – Ralph Thoresby, British historian (d. 1725)
- August 18 – Jan František Beckovský, Czech historian (d. 1722)
- August 22 – John Ernest IV, Duke of Saxe-Coburg-Saalfeld (d. 1729)
- August 28 – Honoré Tournély, French theologian (d. 1729)
- September 1 – Jacques Bernard, French theologian and publicist (d. 1718)
- September 16 – John Dennis, English dramatist and critic (d. 1734)
- September 24 – Sir Robert Anstruther, 1st Baronet, Scottish politician (d. 1737)
- September 30 – Elisabeth Eleonore of Brunswick-Wolfenbüttel, Duchess consort of Saxe-Meiningen (d. 1729)
- October 2 – Nicholas Roosevelt (1658–1742), Dutch-American politician (d. 1742)
- October 5 – Mary of Modena, queen of James II of England (d. 1718)
- October 11 – Christian Heinrich Postel, German jurist (d. 1705)
- October 18 – Alexander of Courland, German prince (d. 1686)
- October 19 – Adolphus Frederick II, Duke of Mecklenburg-Strelitz (d. 1704)
- October 21 – Henri de Boulainvilliers, French nobleman (d. 1722)
- October 24 – Marko Gerbec, Carniolan physician, scientist (d. 1718)
- November 2 – Baptist Noel (MP), English politician (d. 1690)
- November 4 – Sulkhan-Saba Orbeliani, Georgian prince, writer, monk and author (d. 1725)
- November 21 – Johann Gottfried Roesner, Prussian burgomaster (d. 1724)
- November 27 – Tsarevna Catherine Alekseyevna of Russia, daughter of Tsar Alexis of Russia (d. 1718)
- November 27 – Hercule-Louis Turinetti, marquis of Prié (d. 1726)
- December 2 – Sir Thomas Roberts, 4th Baronet, English politician (d. 1706)
- December 10 – Lancelot Blackburne, Archbishop of York (d. 1743)
- date unknown – Elizabeth Barry, English actress (d. 1713)

== Deaths ==
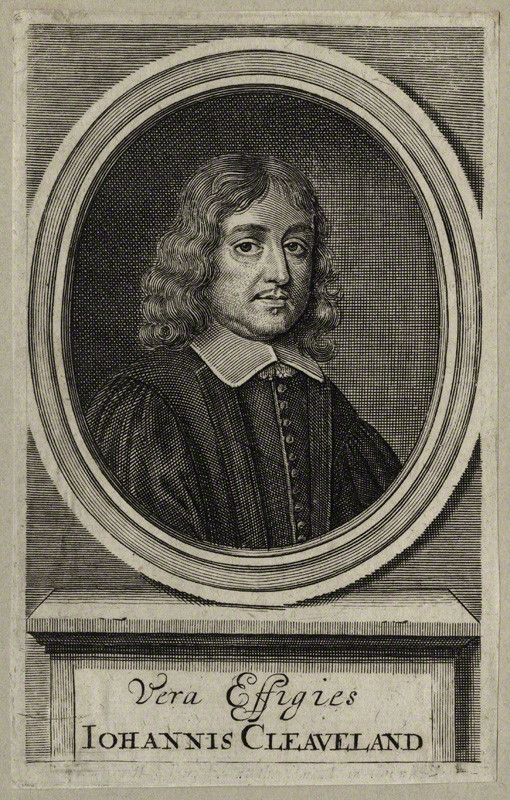
John Cleveland

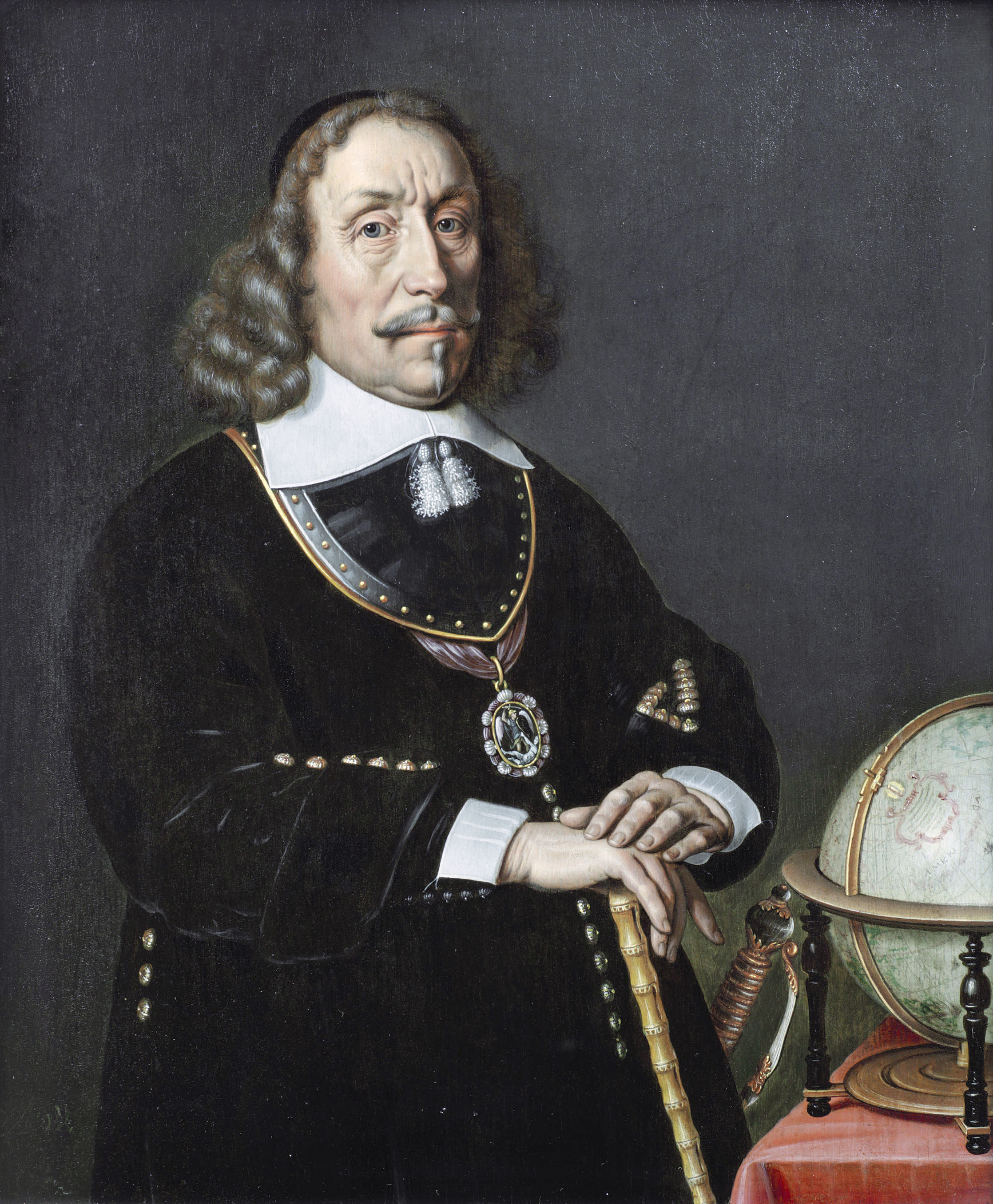
Witte Corneliszoon de With

- January 1 – Caspar Sibelius, Dutch Protestant minister (b. 1590)
- January 2 – Sir William Armine, 2nd Baronet, English politician (b. 1622)
- January 7 – Theophilus Eaton, English-born Connecticut colonist (b. 1590)
- January 13 – Edward Sexby, English Puritan soldier (b. 1616)
- February 19 – Henry Wilmot, 1st Earl of Rochester (b. 1612)
- March 25 – Herman IV, Landgrave of Hesse-Rotenburg (b. 1607)
- February 27 – Adolf Frederick I, Duke of Mecklenburg-Schwerin (1592–1628 and again 1631–1658) (b. 1588)
- March 29 – Bertuccio Valiero, Doge of Venice (b. 1596)
- April 7 – Juan Eusebio Nieremberg, Spanish mystic (b. 1595)
- April 19
  - Kirsten Munk, second wife of Christian IV of Denmark (b. 1598)
  - Robert Rich, 2nd Earl of Warwick, English colonial administrator and admiral (b. 1587)
- April 24 – Francesco Maria Richini, Italian architect (b. 1584)
- April 29 – John Cleveland, English poet (b. 1613)
- May 20 – Bartholomew Holzhauser, German priest, visionary and writer of prophecies (b. 1613)
- June 18 – Louis Cappel, French Protestant churchman and scholar (b. 1585)
- June 8 – Sir Henry Slingsby, 1st Baronet, English baronet (b. 1602)
- June 27 – Ercole Gennari, Italian drawer and painter (b. 1597)
- July 22 – Frederick, Duke of Schleswig-Holstein-Sønderburg-Norburg (b. 1581)
- August 5 – Gundakar, Prince of Liechtenstein, court official in Vienna (b. 1580)
- August 6 – Elizabeth Claypole, daughter of Oliver Cromwell (b. 1629)
- August 19 – Christine of Hesse-Kassel, Duchess of Saxe-Eisenach and Saxe-Coburg (b. 1578)
- September 3 – Oliver Cromwell, Lord Protector of England, Scotland, and Ireland (b. 1599)
- September 17 – Kaspar von Barth, German philologist and writer (b. 1587)
- September 22 – Georg Philipp Harsdörffer, German poet (b. 1607)
- October 14 – Francesco I d'Este, Duke of Modena, Italian noble (b. 1610)
- October 23 – Thomas Pride, Parliamentarian general in the English Civil War
- November 4 – Antoine Le Maistre, French Jansenist (b. 1608)
- November 6 – Pierre du Ryer, French dramatist (b. 1606)
- November 7 – Maeda Toshitsune, Japanese warlord (b. 1594)
- November 8 – Witte de With, Dutch naval officer (b. 1599)
- November 26 – Duke Francis Henry of Saxe-Lauenburg (b. 1604)
- November 29 – Margrave Charles Magnus of Baden-Durlach (b. 1621)
- December 6 – Baltasar Gracián y Morales, Spanish writer (b. 1601)
- December 15 – Carlo Emanuele Madruzzo, Italian prince-bishop (b. 1599)
- December 20 – Jean Jannon, French typefounder (b. 1580)
- Date unknown: Osoet Pegua, Thai businesswoman (b. 1615)
