= Illuka =

Village in Estonia

- Village
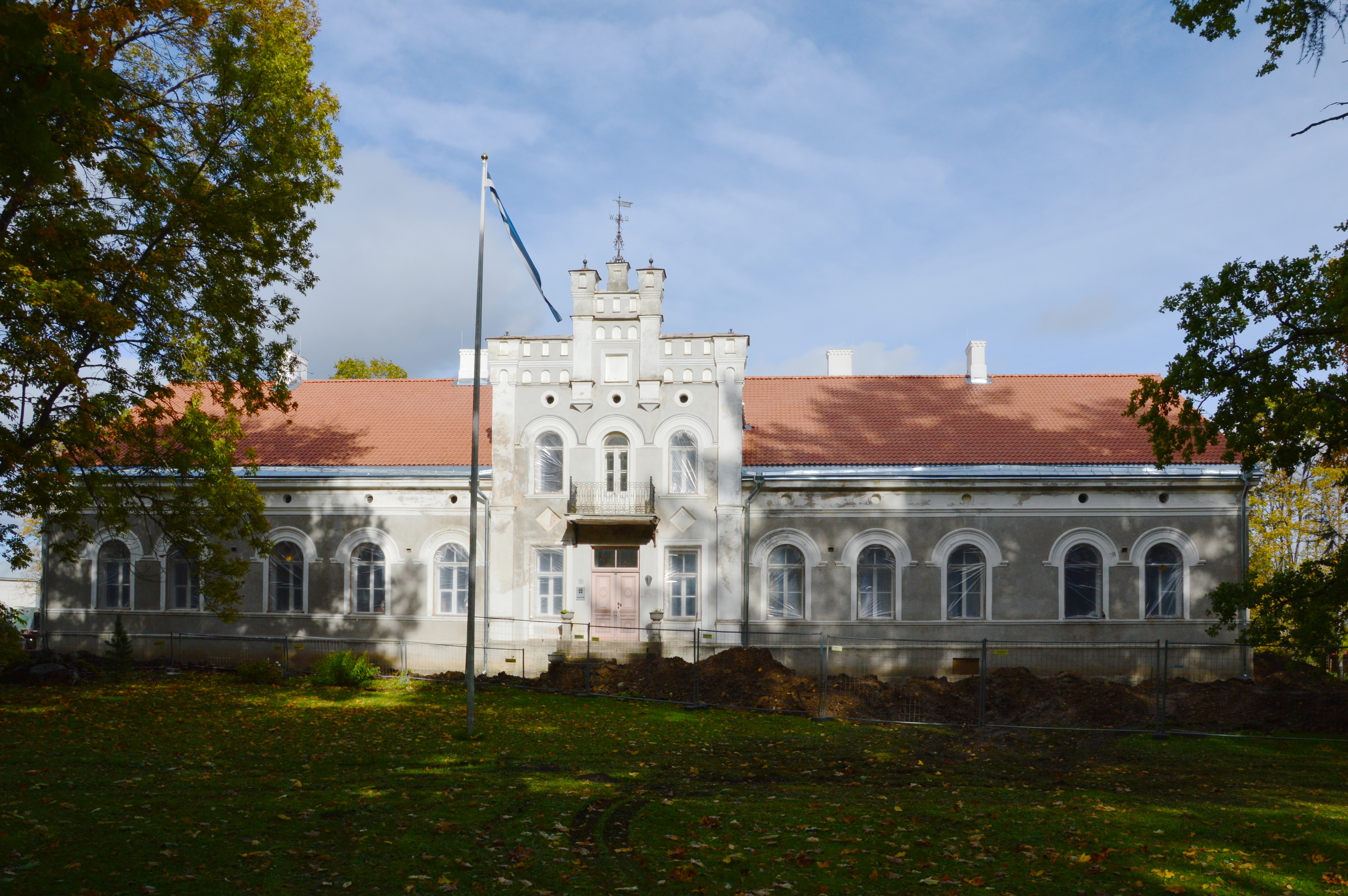
- Illuka Manor

- Location in Estonia
- Coordinates: 59°14′00″N 27°29′00″E
- Country: Estonia
- County: Ida-Viru County
- Parish: Alutaguse Parish
- Time zone: UTC+2 (EET)
  - Summer (DST): UTC+3 (EEST)

Illuka is a village in Ida-Viru County in Alutaguse Parish in northeastern Estonia. It was the administrative centre of Illuka Parish.

== Illuka Manor ==
Illuka Manor (German: Illuck) was established as a manorial estate in 1657, but the presently visible main building dates from 1888. It was designed by the architect Friedrich Modi. Restoration work was carried out in the 1990s and again in 2013–2015.

== Gallery ==
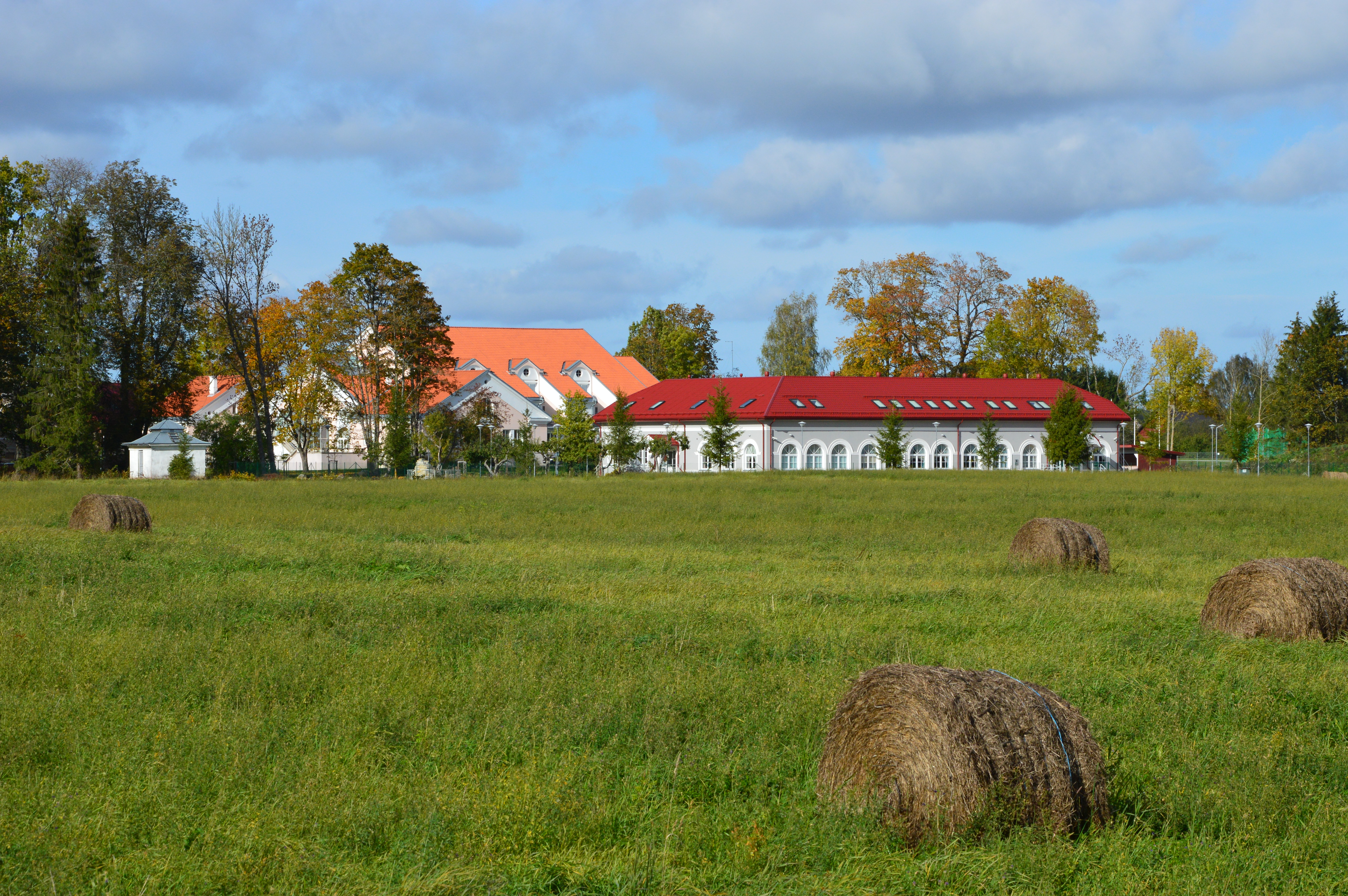

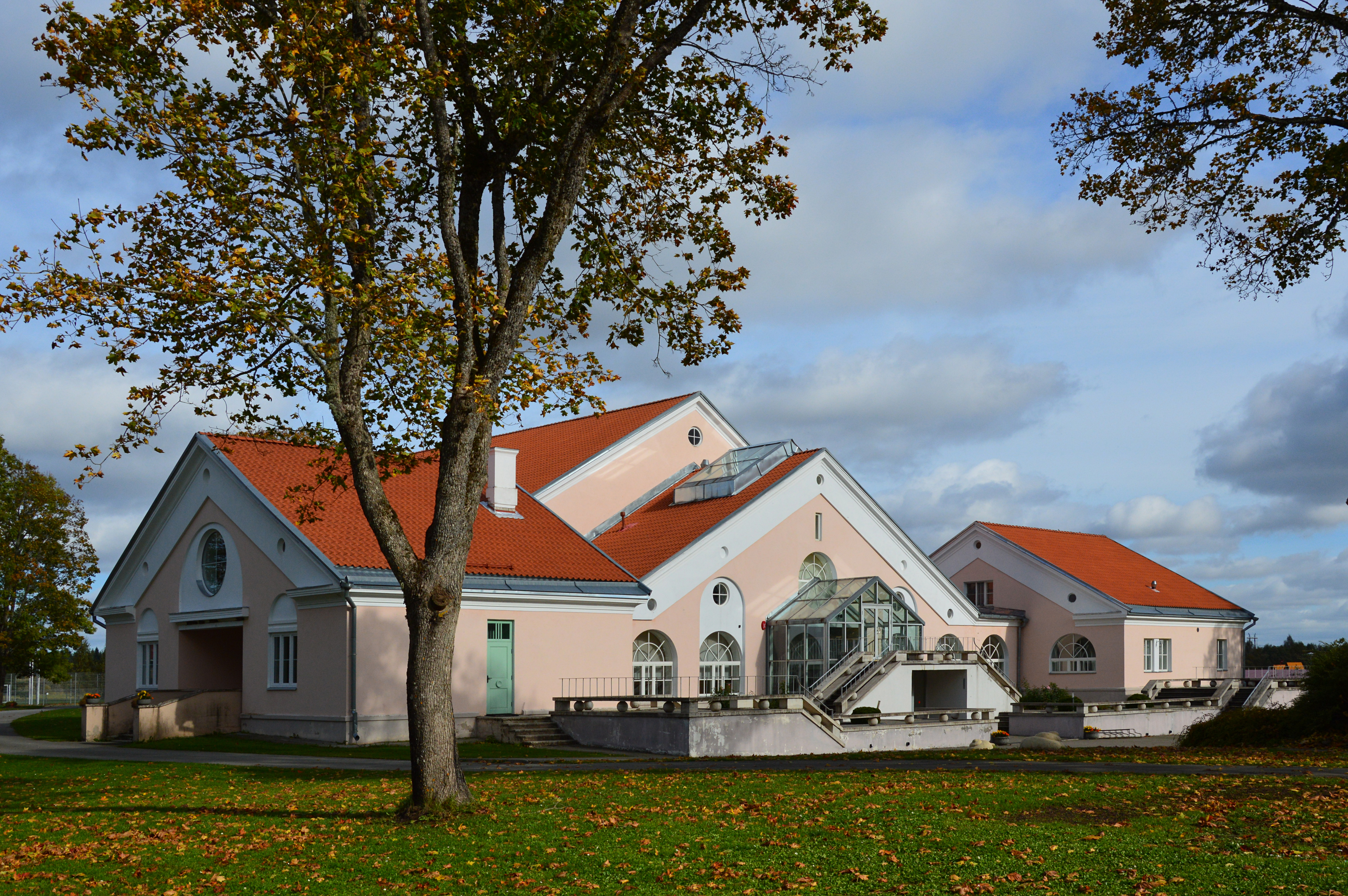

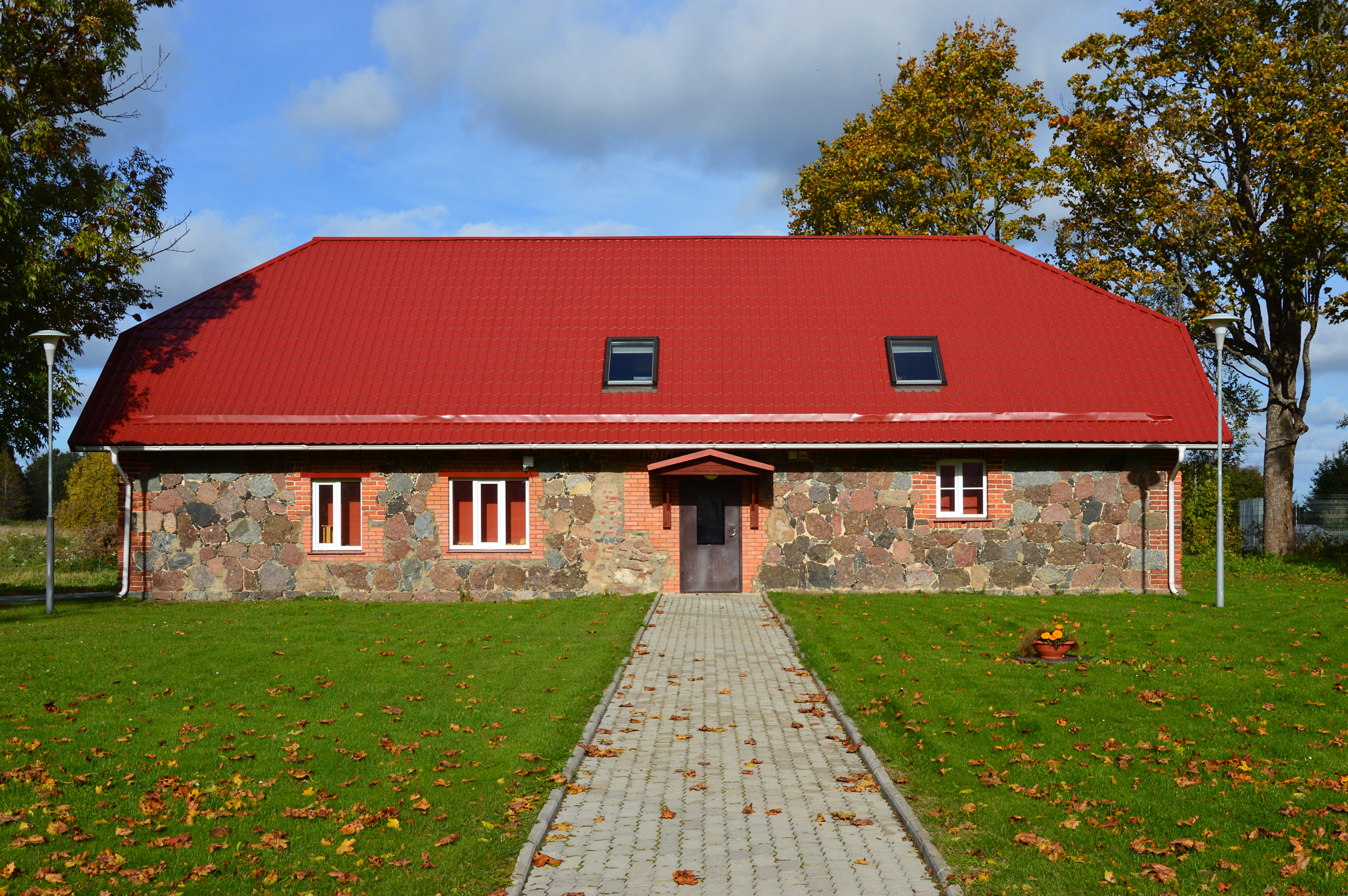

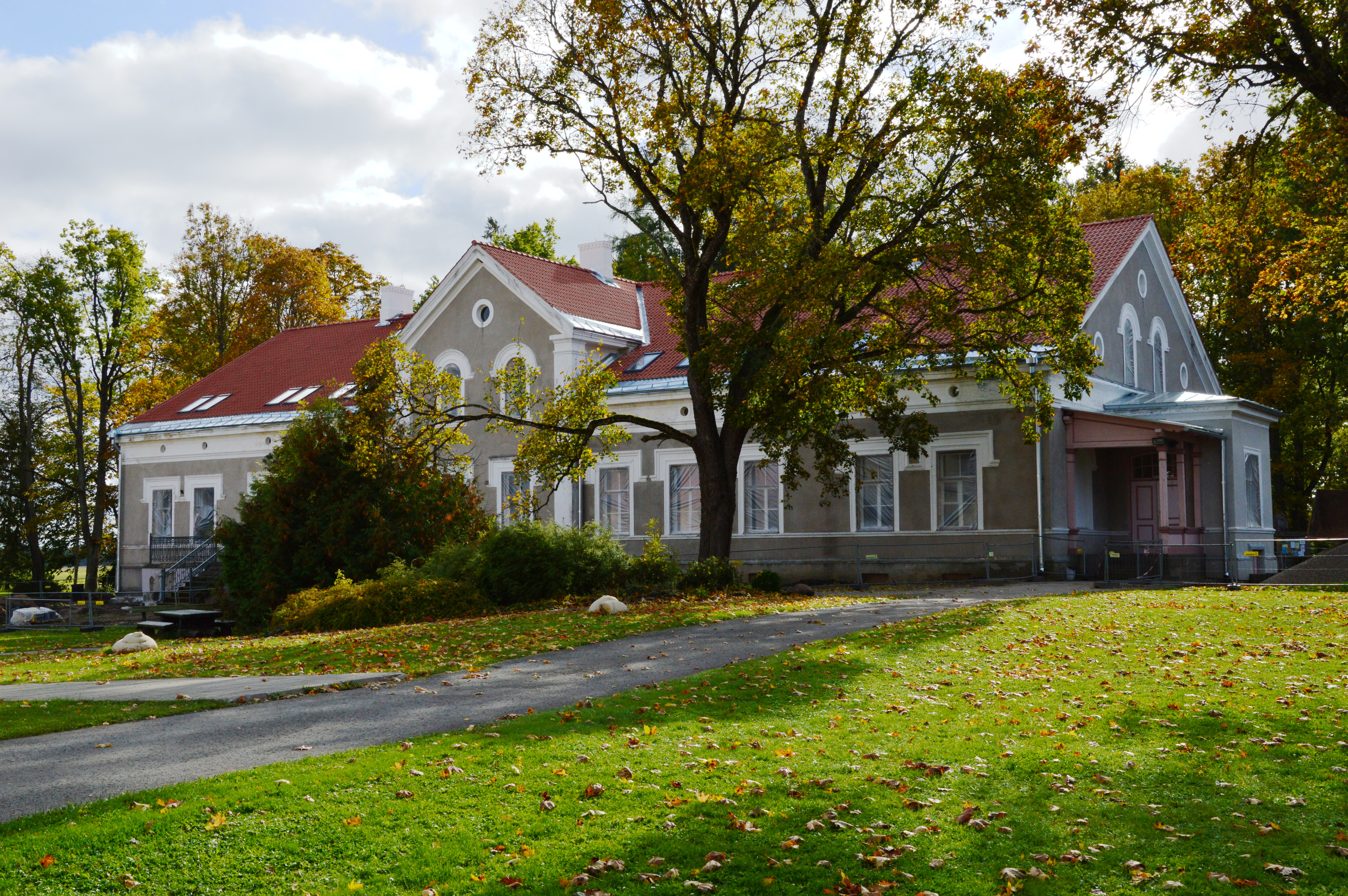
