= Alexander of Courland =

- Prince of Courland
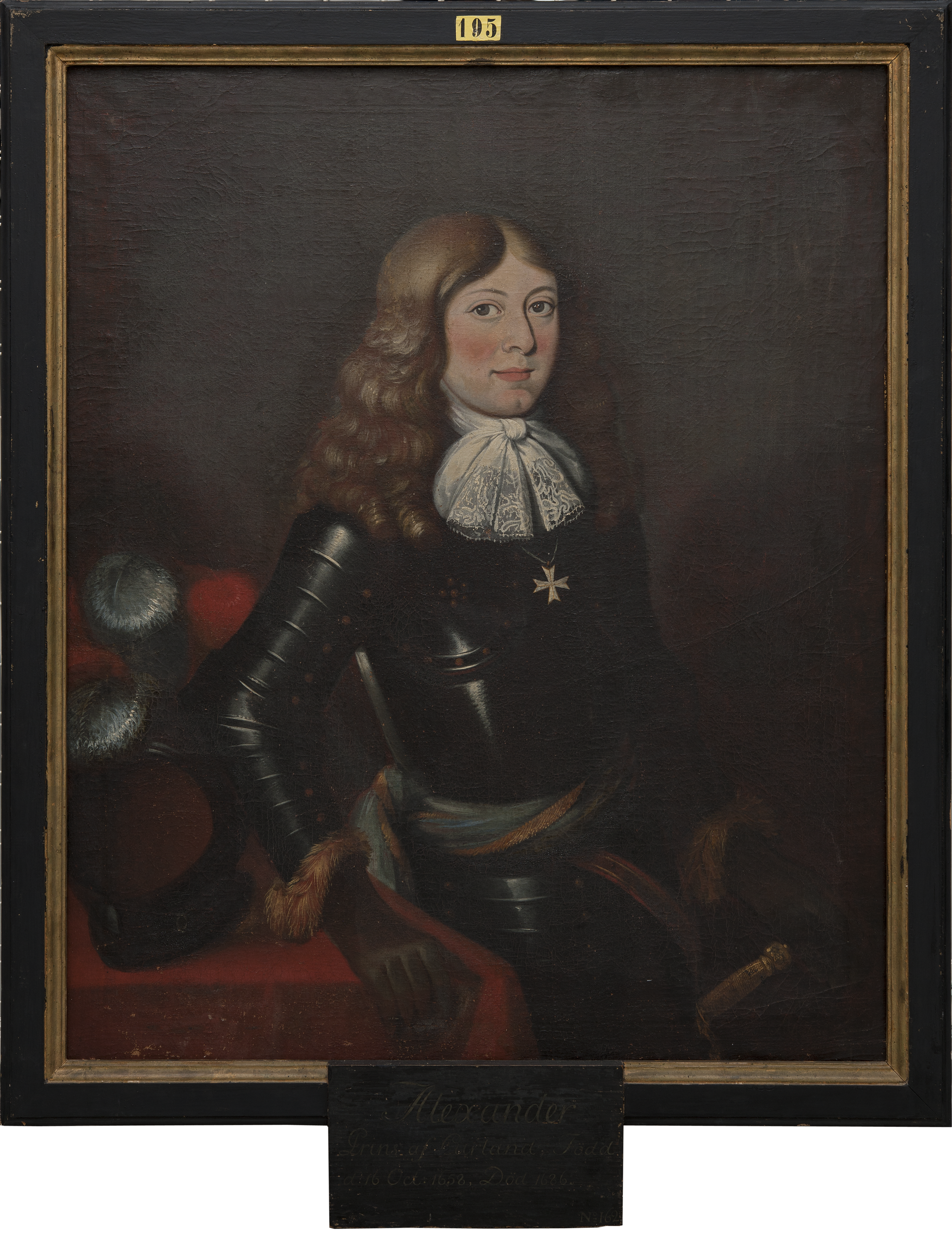
- Portrait of Alexander of Courland from Sweden national museum.
- Born: 18 October 1658; Riga, Swedish Livonia
- Died: 28 June 1686 (aged 27); Near Sopron, Holy Roman Empire
- House: Ketteler
- Father: Jacob Kettler
- Mother: Louise Charlotte of Brandenburg

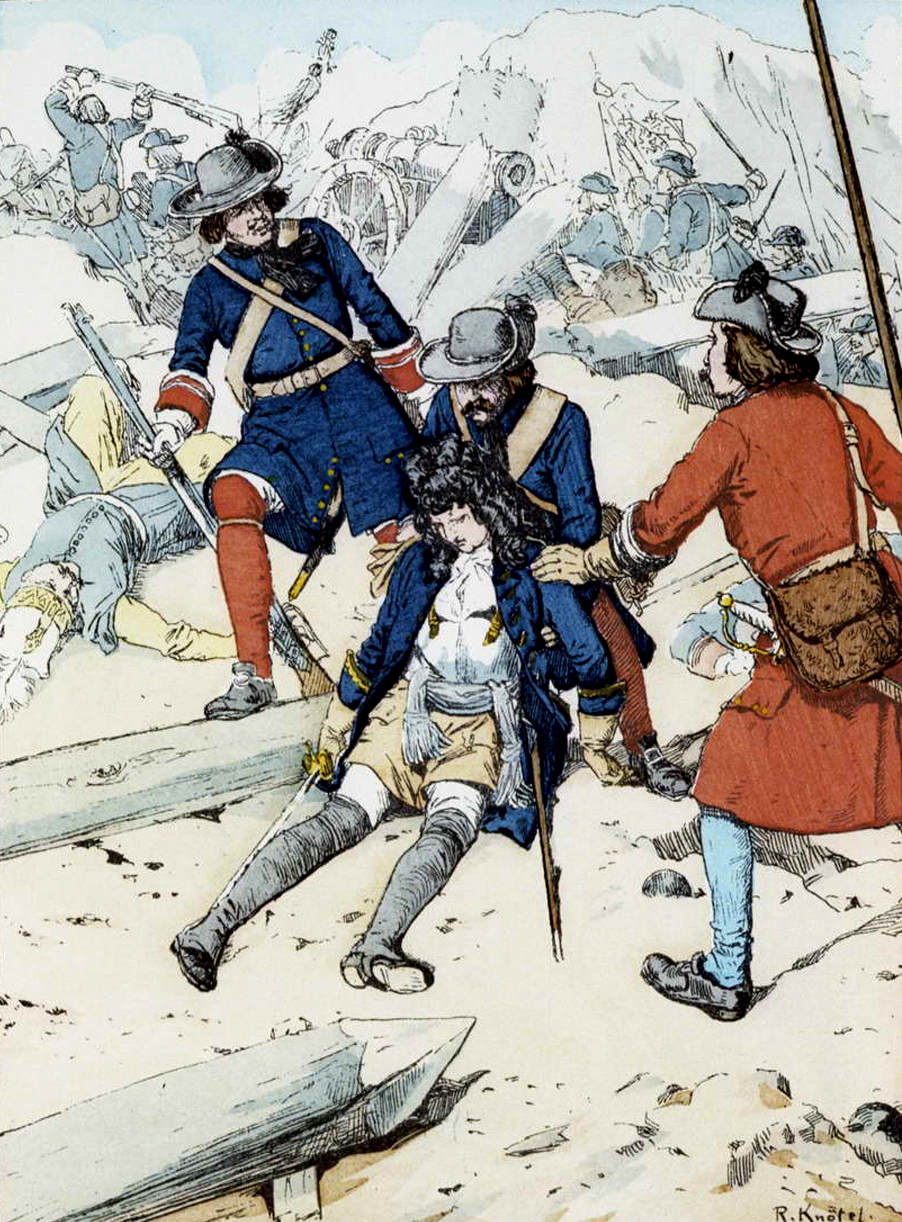
The wounding of Alexander of Courland in the storm on Buda

Alexander of Courland (German: Alexander von Kurland) (18 October 1658 – 28 June 1686), nicknamed "Alexander the One-armed", was a Baltic German prince and the brother of Duke Frederick (II) Casimir of Courland. He was the youngest son of Jakob Kettler (1610–1682), Duke of Courland and his wife Luise Charlotte von Brandenburg (1617–1676), eldest daughter of Prince elector Georg Wilhelm von Brandenburg. He was a member of the Kettler dynasty.

Alexander of Courland was born while his family was held captive in Riga by the Swedes. Later they were sent to Ivangorod and were allowed to return to Courland only after the Treaty of Oliva was signed in 1660. As the youngest member of the family, Alexander was destined for a military career. It is possible that he joined his brother Carl Jacob in the Scanian War against Sweden during 1674–1679. In 1683 in East Prussia Alexander formed a battalion of mercenaries. In 1685 it became the Regiment Kurland and consisted of two battalions. He admitted exiled French Huguenots into his unit.

Alexander served as an Oberst in his regiment which was part of the Brandenburg-Prussian Army. On 26 July 1686, he was mortally wounded in the second siege of Buda during the Ottoman wars and died shortly afterwards while en route to Vienna.

His remains were transported back to Mitau and interred in Ducal crypt of the Dukes of Courland in Jelgava Palace.
