= Edivere =

Village in Estonia

- Village
- Location within Estonia
- Coordinates: 59°14′N 27°31′E
- Country: Estonia
- County: Ida-Viru County
- Parish: Alutaguse Parish
- Time zone: UTC+2 (EET)
  - Summer (DST): UTC+3 (EEST)

Edivere (German: Eddifer) is a village in Alutaguse Parish, Ida-Viru County in northeastern Estonia.
