= Gorodenka Creek =

River in Estonia

Location
- Country: Estonia

Physical characteristics
- Mouth: Narva
  - coordinates: 59°08′25″N 27°49′09″E
- Length: 18.5 km

Gorodenka Creek (Estonian: Gorodenka oja) is a stream in Alutaguse Parish, Ida-Viru County, Estonia. The river joins the Narva river on its left side 19 km (12 mi) from the mouth of Lake Peipus.

== Course ==
The Gorodenka is an 18.5-kilometer (11.5 mi) long forest stream, and it flows toward the east. It runs through a drained forest area, where its course has been straightened. Despite that, the stream flows along rocky outcrops in some places. Halfway, it reaches Puhatu Swamp and Kasesoo and Laukasoo, which it passes between. After the marshes, it continues to the source Kuningaküla. The stream empties into the Narva River.
