= Vallisaare =

Village in Estonia

- Village
- Location within Estonia
- Coordinates: 59.216°N 27.884°E
- Country: Estonia
- County: Ida-Viru County
- Parish: Alutaguse Parish
- Time zone: UTC+2 (EET)
  - Summer (DST): UTC+3 (EEST)

Vallisaare was a village in Estonia, now part of Kuningaküla in the Alutaguse Parish, Ida-Viru County. The village was located on the western bank of the Narva River.

Vallisaare was mentioned in 1655 as a village with three farms belonging to the Samokrass (later Arumäe) manor. On 30 December [O.S. 20 December] 1658, the Treaty of Valiesar between Sweden and Russia ending the war of 1656–1658 was signed in the village, remaining in effect until the 1661 Treaty of Cardis. After the Great Northern War, the village was renamed Usnovo (also called Uusnova or Ustna), but the name Vallisaare remained in local use.

In 1922, the village consisted of one farm with three inhabitants. The name was officially changed back to Vallisaare in 1934. Vallisaare was abandoned after World War II.
