= Kurtna, Ida-Viru County =

Village in Estonia

Coordinates: 59°16′24″N 27°29′40″E

Kurtna
- Village
- Interactive map of Kurtna
- Country: Estonia
- County: Ida-Viru County
- Parish: Alutaguse Parish
- Time zone: UTC+2 (EET)
  - Summer (DST): UTC+3 (EEST)

Kurtna is a village in Alutaguse Parish, Ida-Viru County in northeastern Estonia.

== Gallery ==
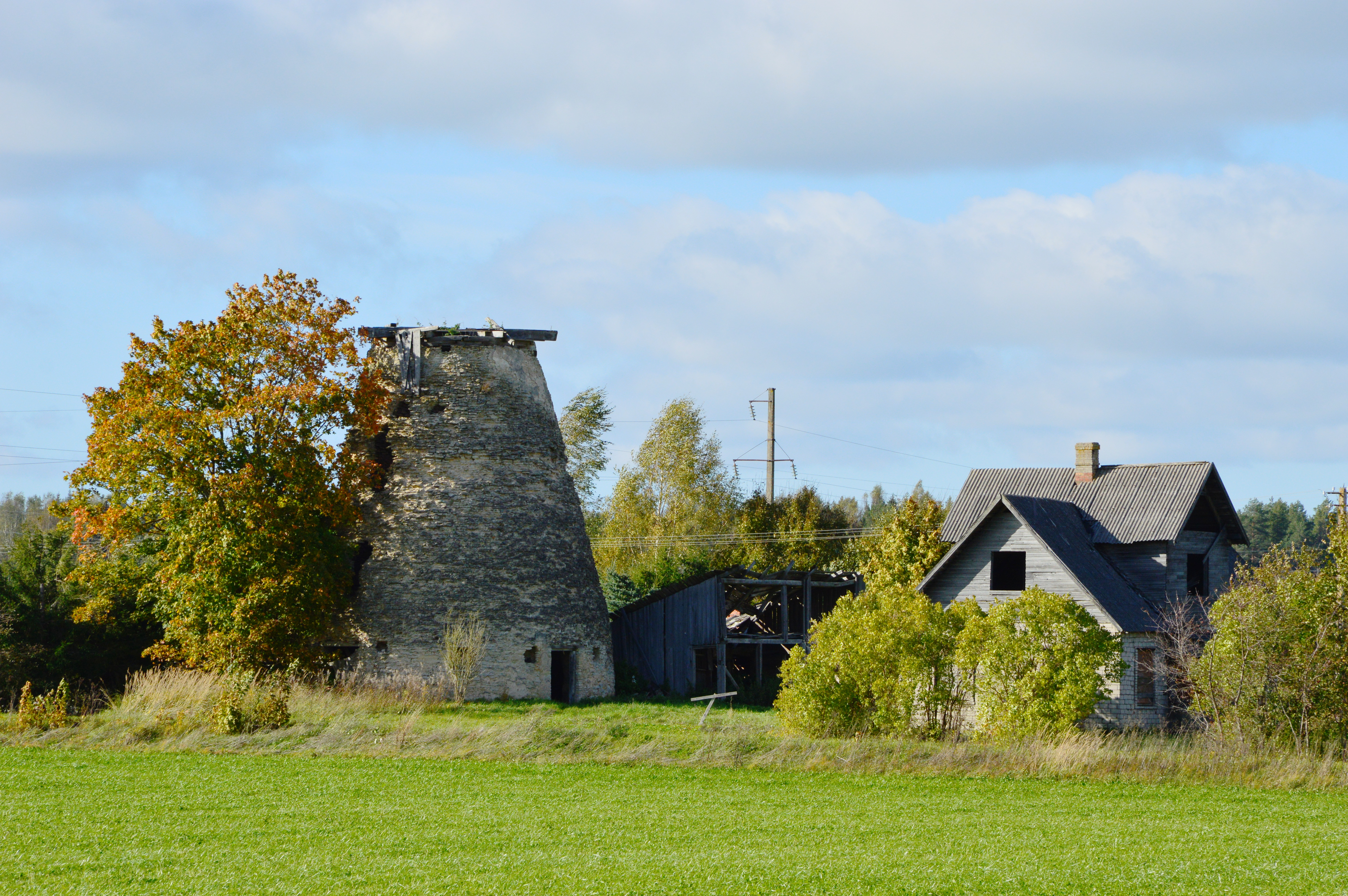
Kurtna manor windmill

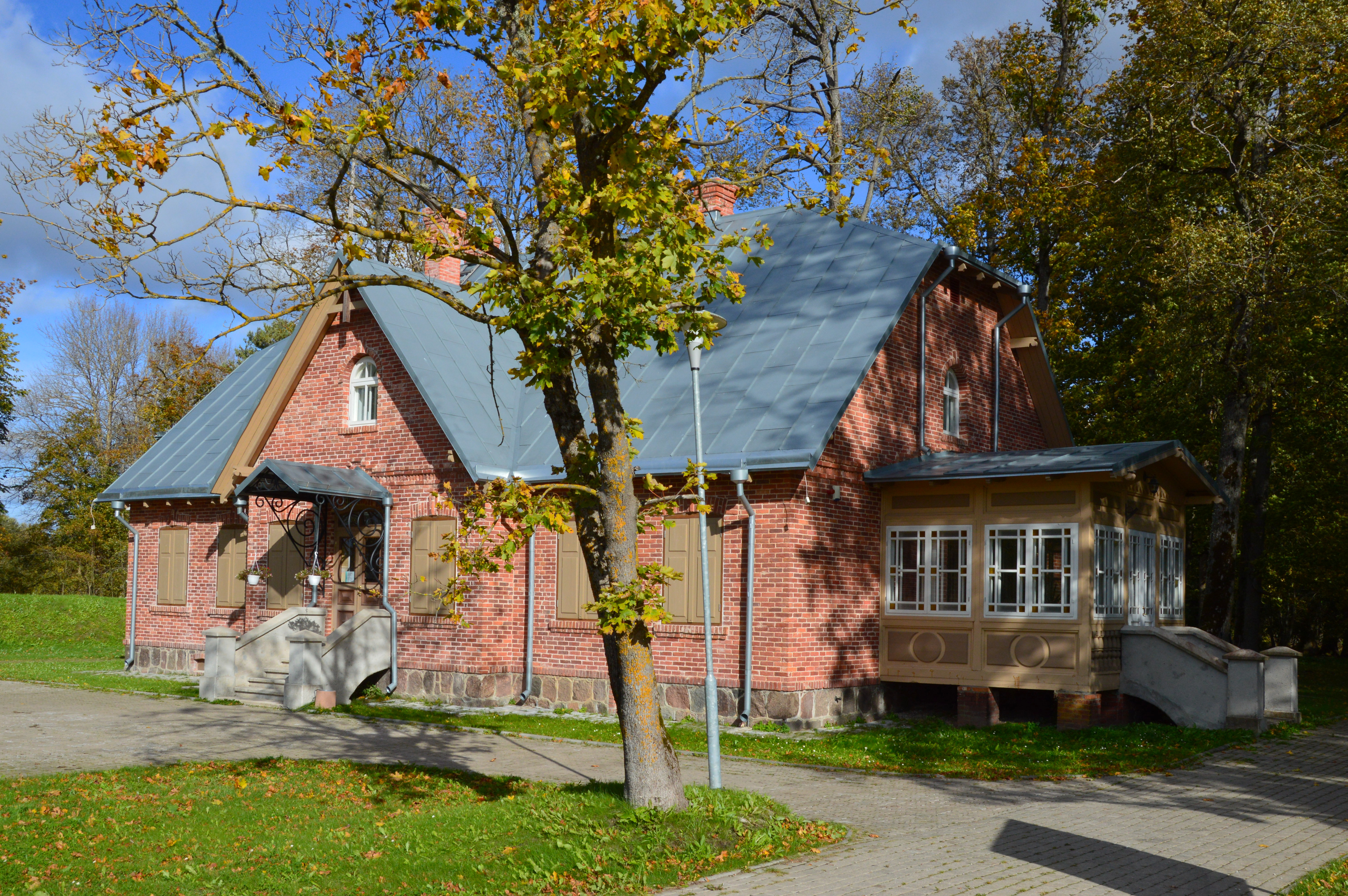
Kurtna manor steward's house

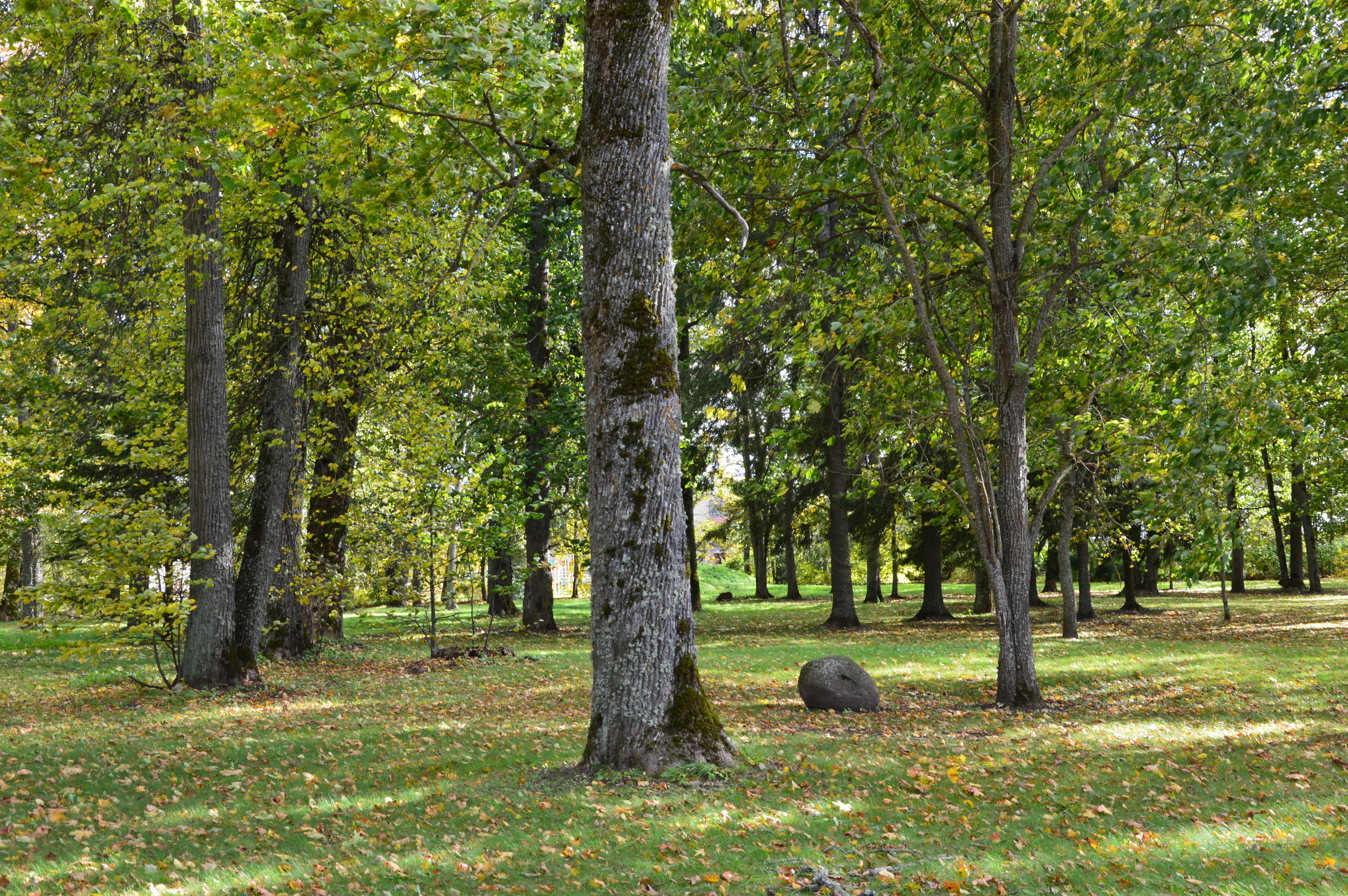
Kurtna manor park
