= Agusalu =

Village in Estonia

Coordinates: 59°06′N 27°39′E

- Village
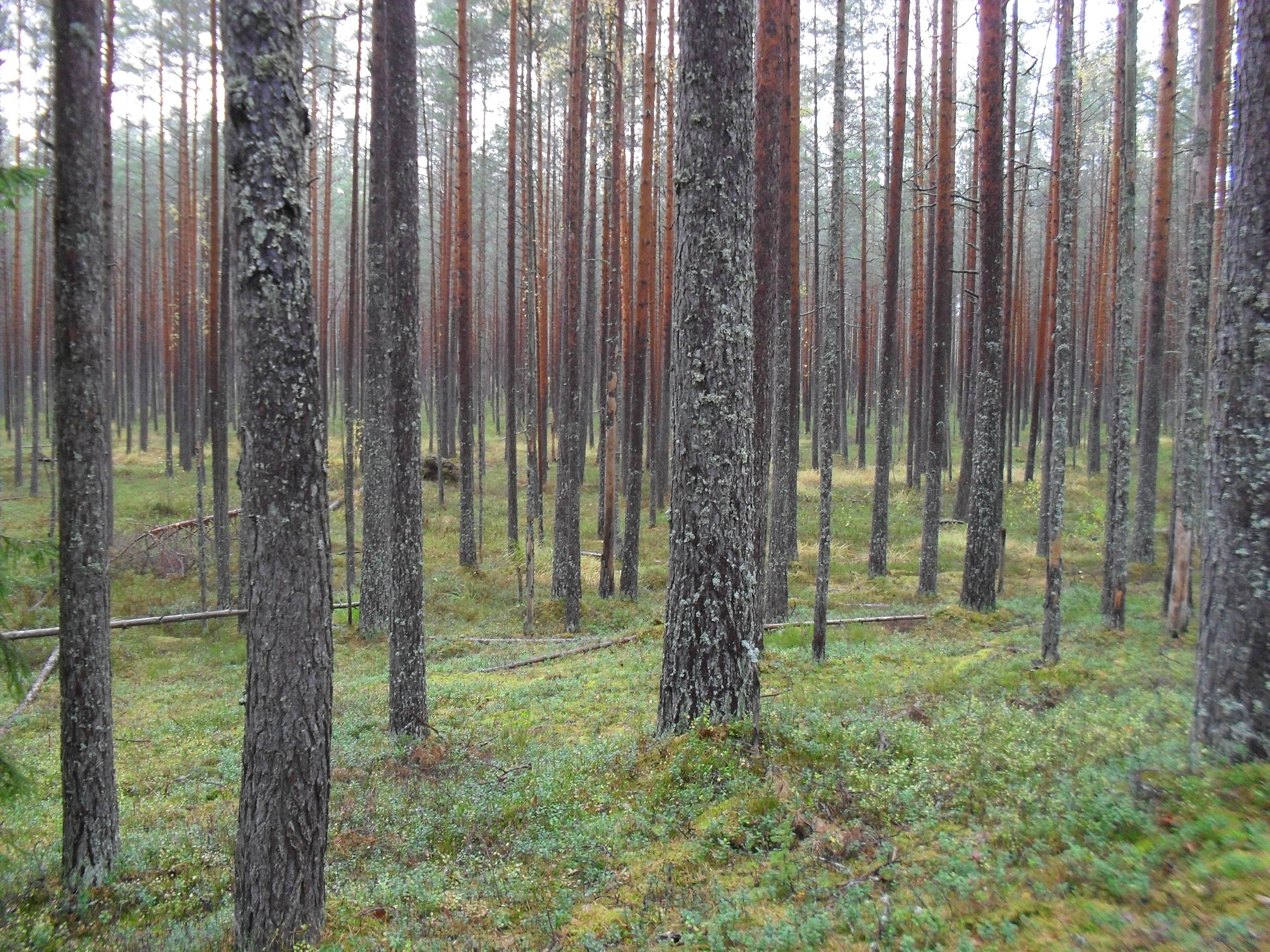
- Interactive map of Agusalu
- Country: Estonia
- County: Ida-Viru County
- Parish: Alutaguse Parish
- Time zone: UTC+2 (EET)
  - Summer (DST): UTC+3 (EEST)

Agusalu is a village in Alutaguse Parish, Ida-Viru County in northeastern Estonia. It is particularly known for the Agusalu Nature Reserve, which encompasses a large proportion of the area. Its landscape is characterised by large bogs and is known for hosting the only system of continental sand dunes in Estonia.
