= Puhatu =

Village in Estonia

Coordinates: 59°11′05″N 27°37′46″E

- Village
- Interactive map of Puhatu
- Country: Estonia
- County: Ida-Viru County
- Parish: Alutaguse Parish
- Time zone: UTC+2 (EET)
  - Summer (DST): UTC+3 (EEST)

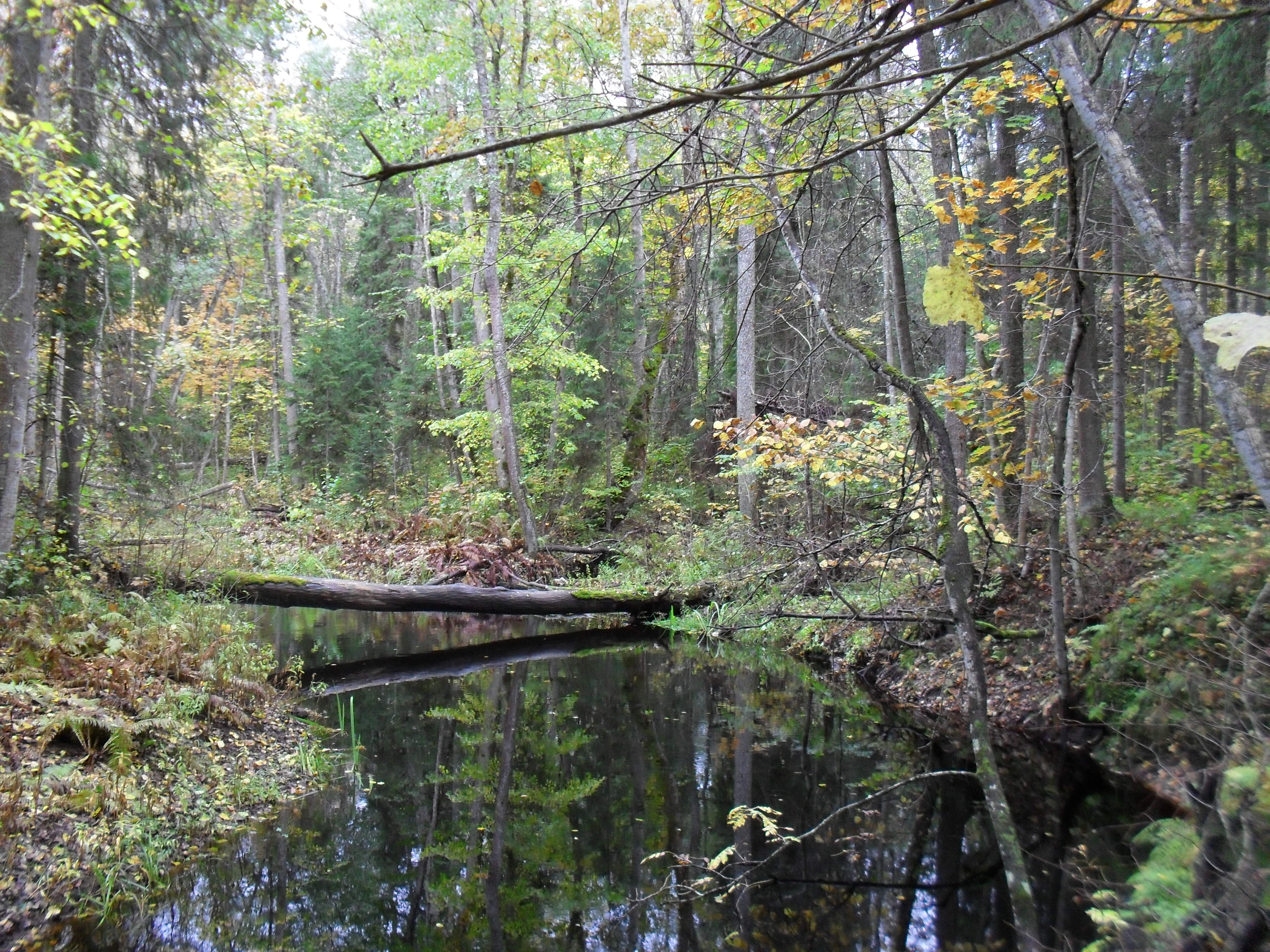
Puhatu Nature Reserve

Puhatu is a village in Alutaguse Parish, Ida-Viru County in northeastern Estonia.
